= Shunde North railway station =

Railway station in Shunde District, Foshan, Guangdong

Shundebei 顺德北站
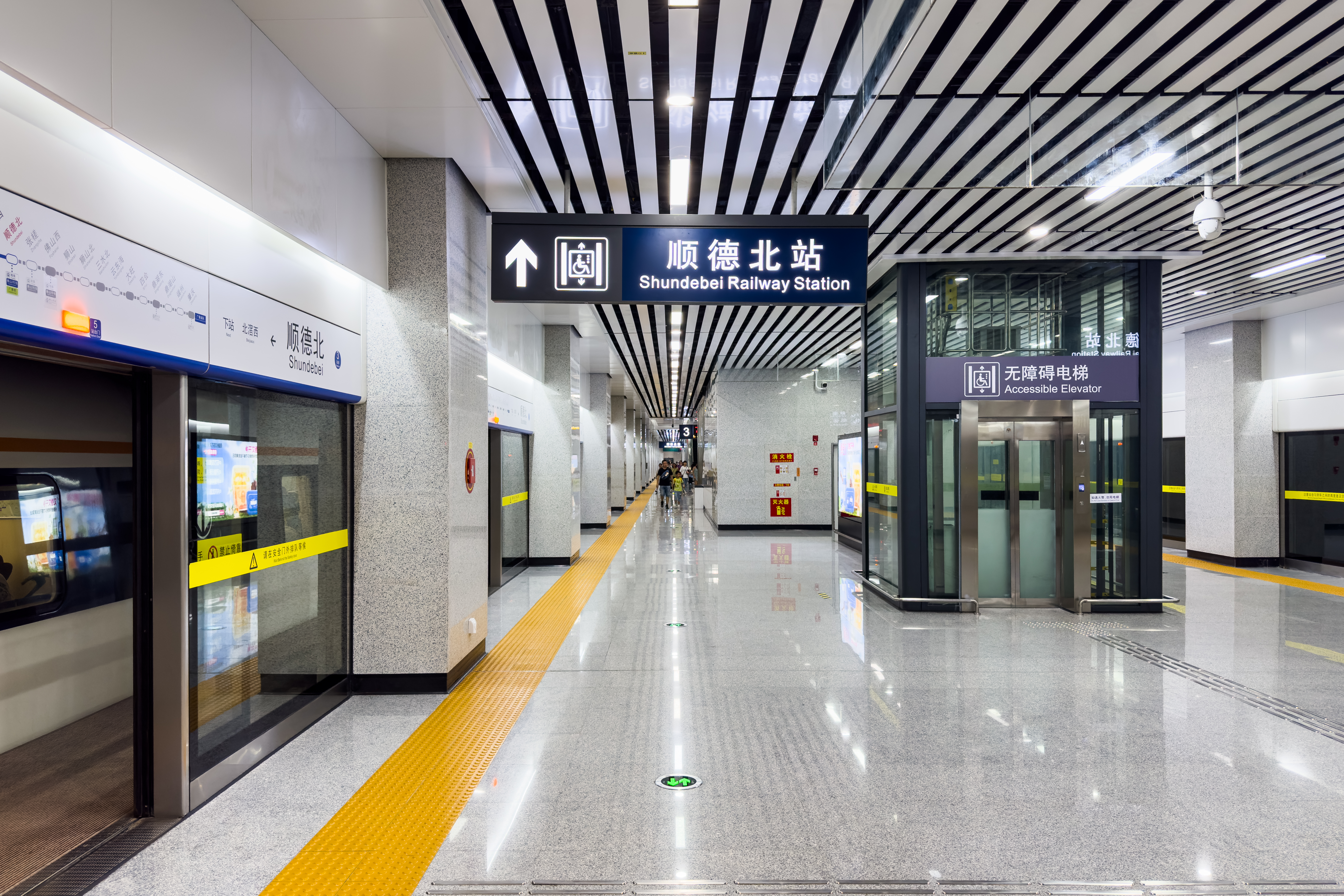
- Platform (towards Panyu railway station)

Chinese name
- Chinese: 顺德北站
Transcriptions
Standard Mandarin
- Hanyu Pinyin: Shùndé Běi Zhàn
Yue: Cantonese
- Yale Romanization: Seuhndāk Bāk Jaahm
- Jyutping: Seon^{6}dak^{1} Bak^{1} Zaam^{6}

General information
- Location: East of the intersection of Yuhe Road (裕和路) and Huazhang Road (华章道) (west side of Foshan International Financial Center), Lecong; Shunde District, Foshan, Guangdong; China
- Coordinates: 22°57′54.11″N 113°7′25.03″E
- Owner: Pearl River Delta Metropolitan Region intercity railway
- Operator: Guangdong Intercity
- Lines: Guangzhou–Foshan circular intercity railway (Southern Ring section); Guangzhou–Zhaoqing intercity railway
- Platforms: 4 (2 island platforms)
- Tracks: 2
- Connections: Guangfo 3 Dongping

Construction
- Structure type: Underground
- Accessible: Yes

Other information
- Station code: SVA (Pinyin: SDB)

History
- Opened: 26 May 2024 (2 years ago)
- Former names: Dongping New Town

Services
Preceding station	Pearl River Delta Metropolitan Region Intercity Railway	Following station
Zhangcha towards Zhaoqing	Guangzhou–Zhaoqing intercity railway	Beijiao West towards Panyu
Transfer at Dongping
Preceding station	Foshan Metro	Following station
Xincheng Dong Terminus	Guangfo Line transfer at Dongping	Shijilian towards Lijiao
Wanhua towards Foshan University	Line 3 transfer at Dongping	Dadun towards Shunde College Railway Station
Location

Shunde North railway station (Chinese: 顺德北站; pinyin: Shùndé Běi Zhàn; Cantonese Yale: Seuhndāk Bāk Jaahm) is an underground railway station in Shunde District, Foshan, Guangdong, China. The station opened on 26 May 2024, and is operated by Guangdong Intercity Railway Operation Co., Ltd.

== Features ==
The station design adopts rectangular block elements, reflecting the rational layout and stability of the planning of Foshan New Town.

== Interchanges ==
The station connects to Dongping, a nearby metro station served by Guangfo line and Line 3 of Foshan Metro.

== Entrances/exits ==
The station has 4 points of entry/exit, lettered A, C, D and E, located on Wenhua South Road and Junlan Road. Exits C and E are accessible via elevators. Exits C, D and E opened with the station's initial opening. In October 2024, Exit A opened.

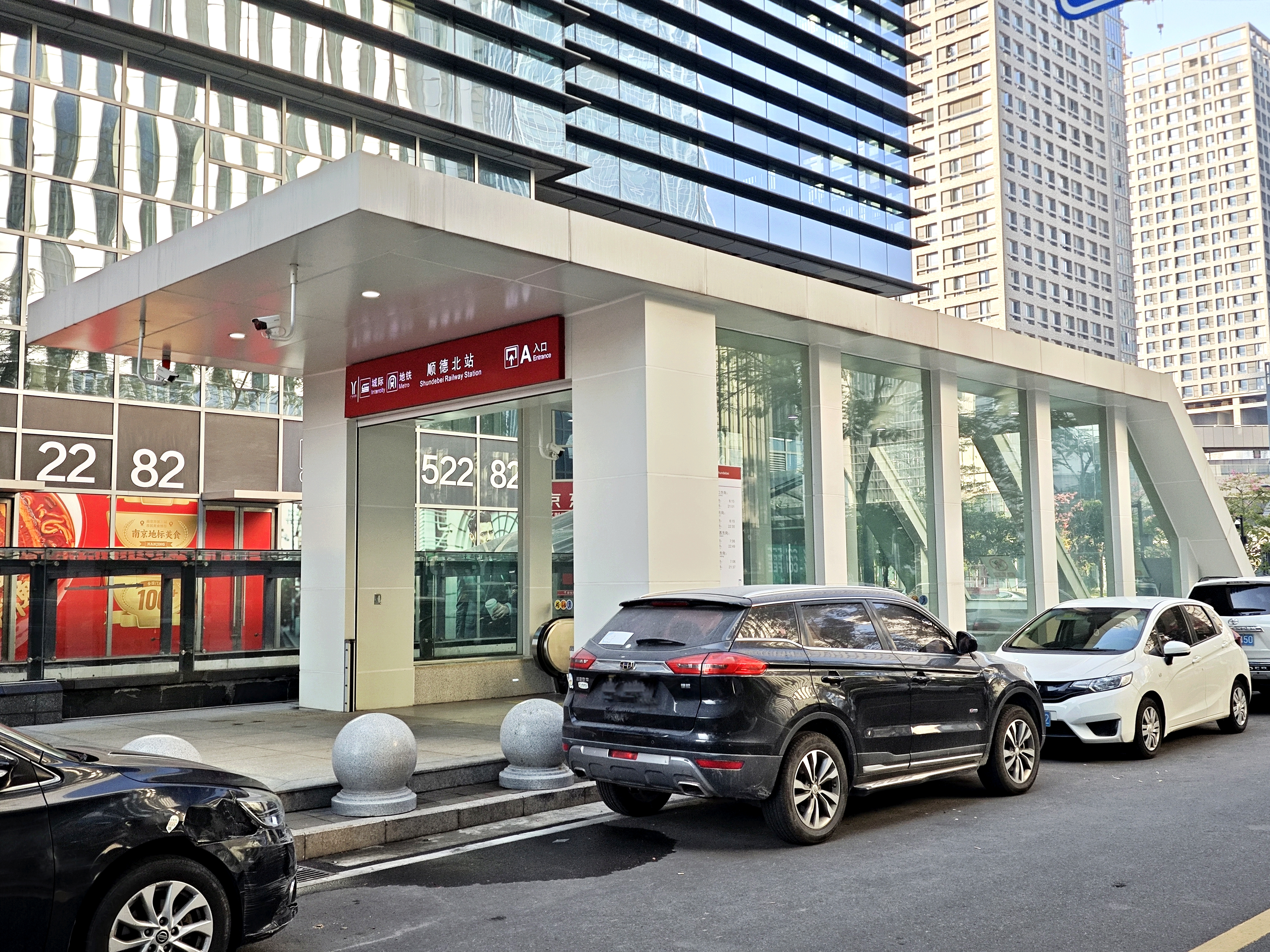
Entrance A

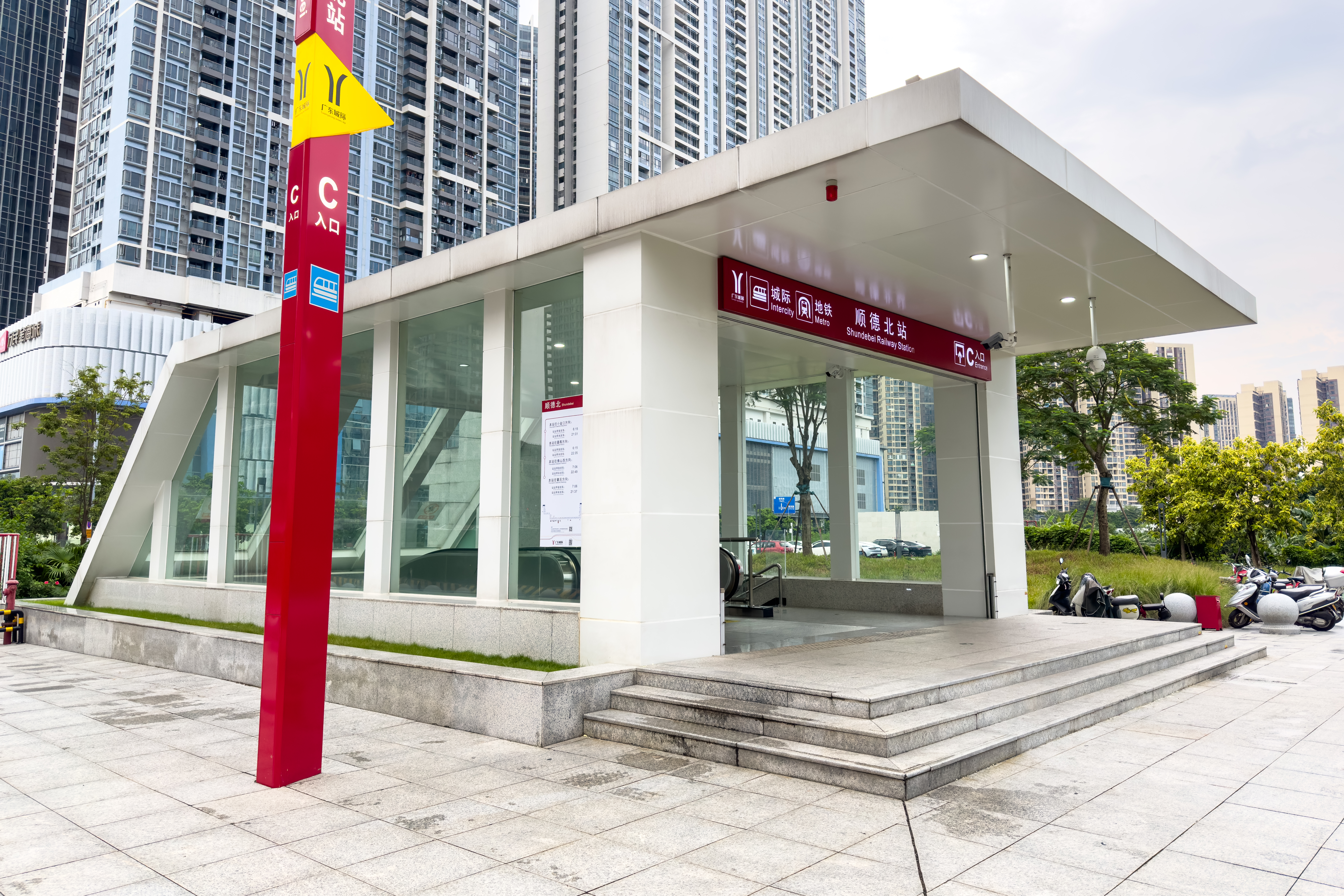
Entrance C

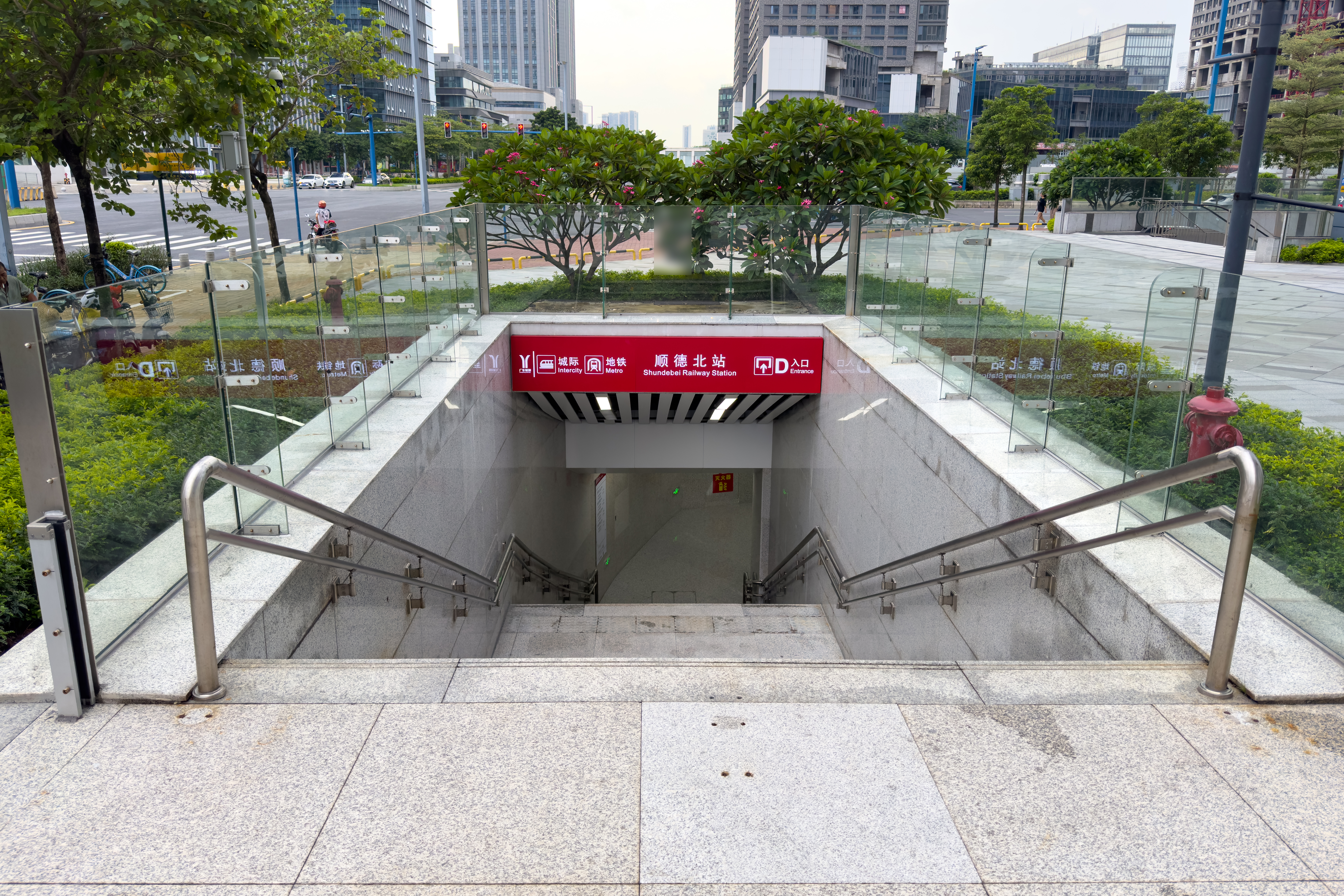
Entrance D

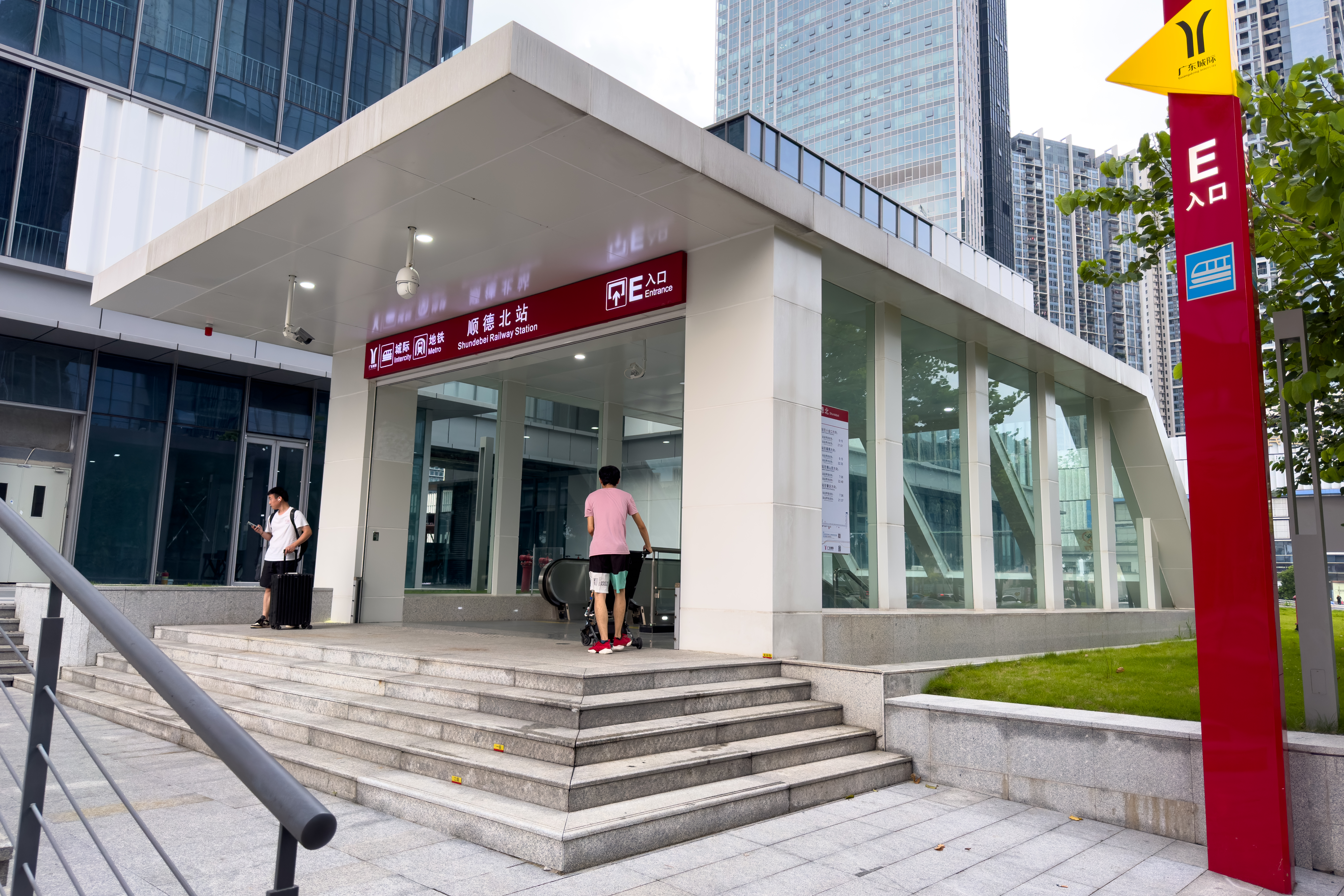
Entrance E

== Gallery ==
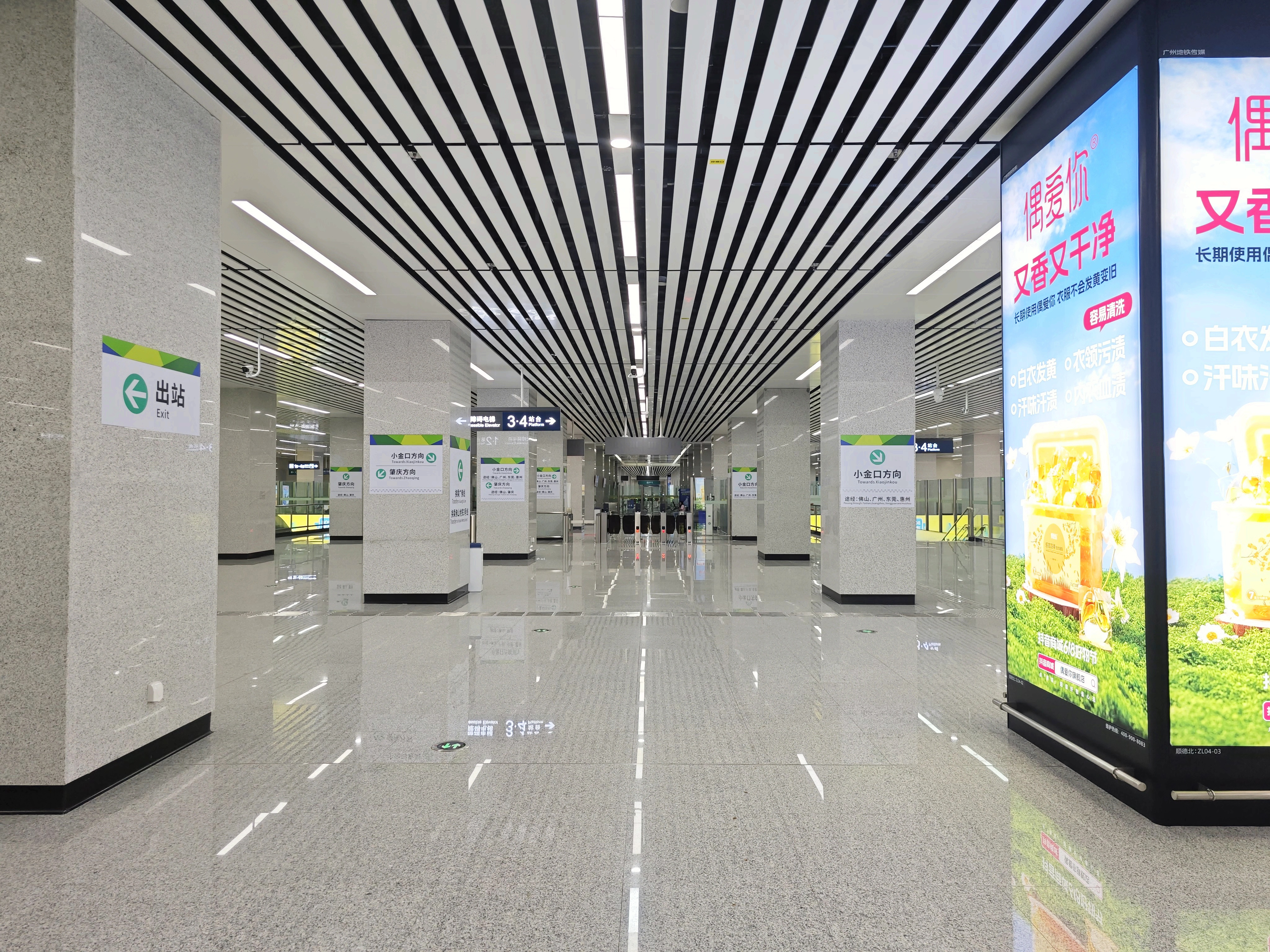
Concourse

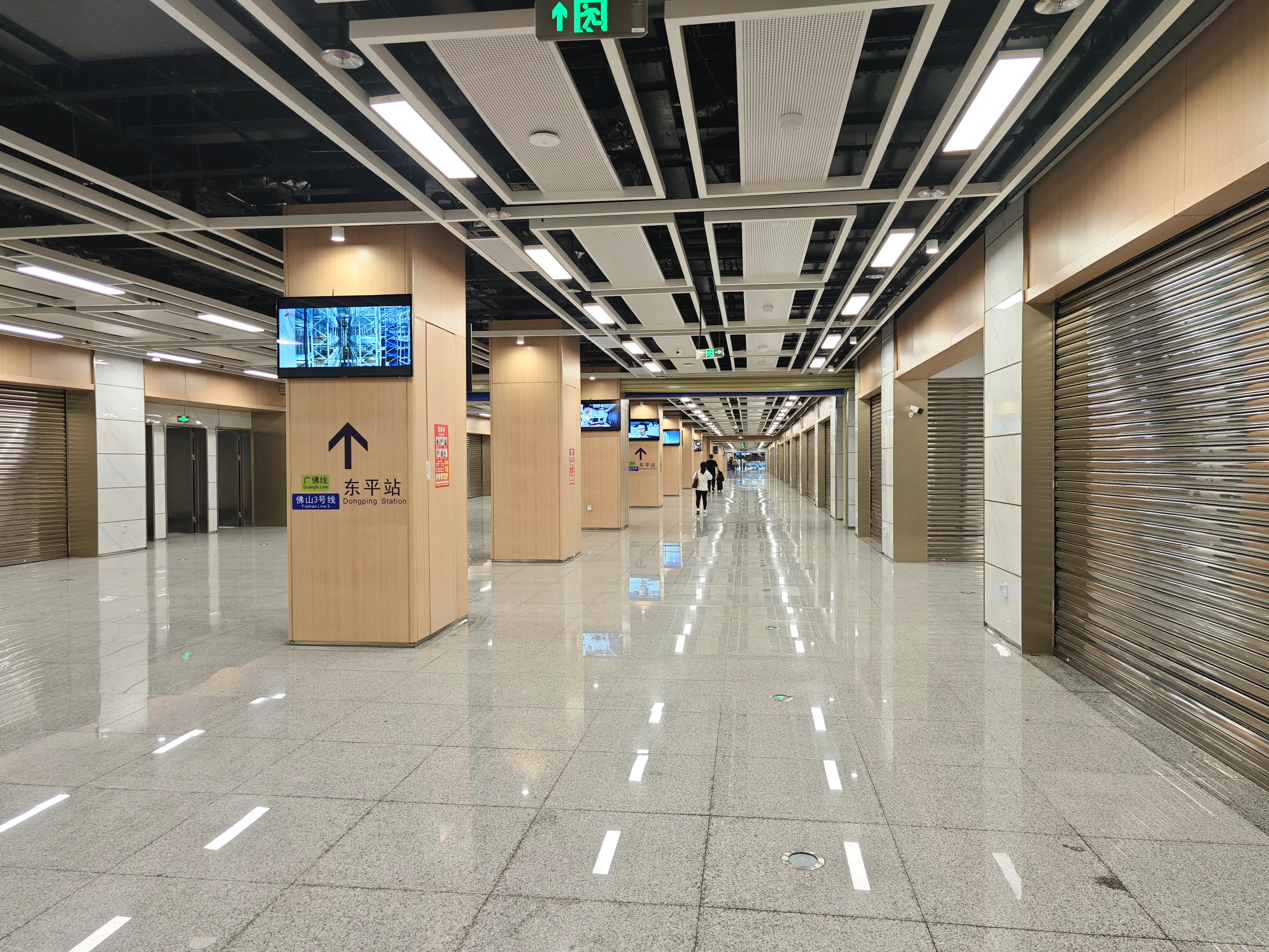
Transfer passageway to Dongping station

== History ==
The station was called Dongping New Town during the planning phase, but was renamed to Shundebei in August 2020.
