= Lanshi station =

Guangfo Metro station in Foshan

Coordinates: 22°59′02″N 113°06′26″E

Lanshi 澜石
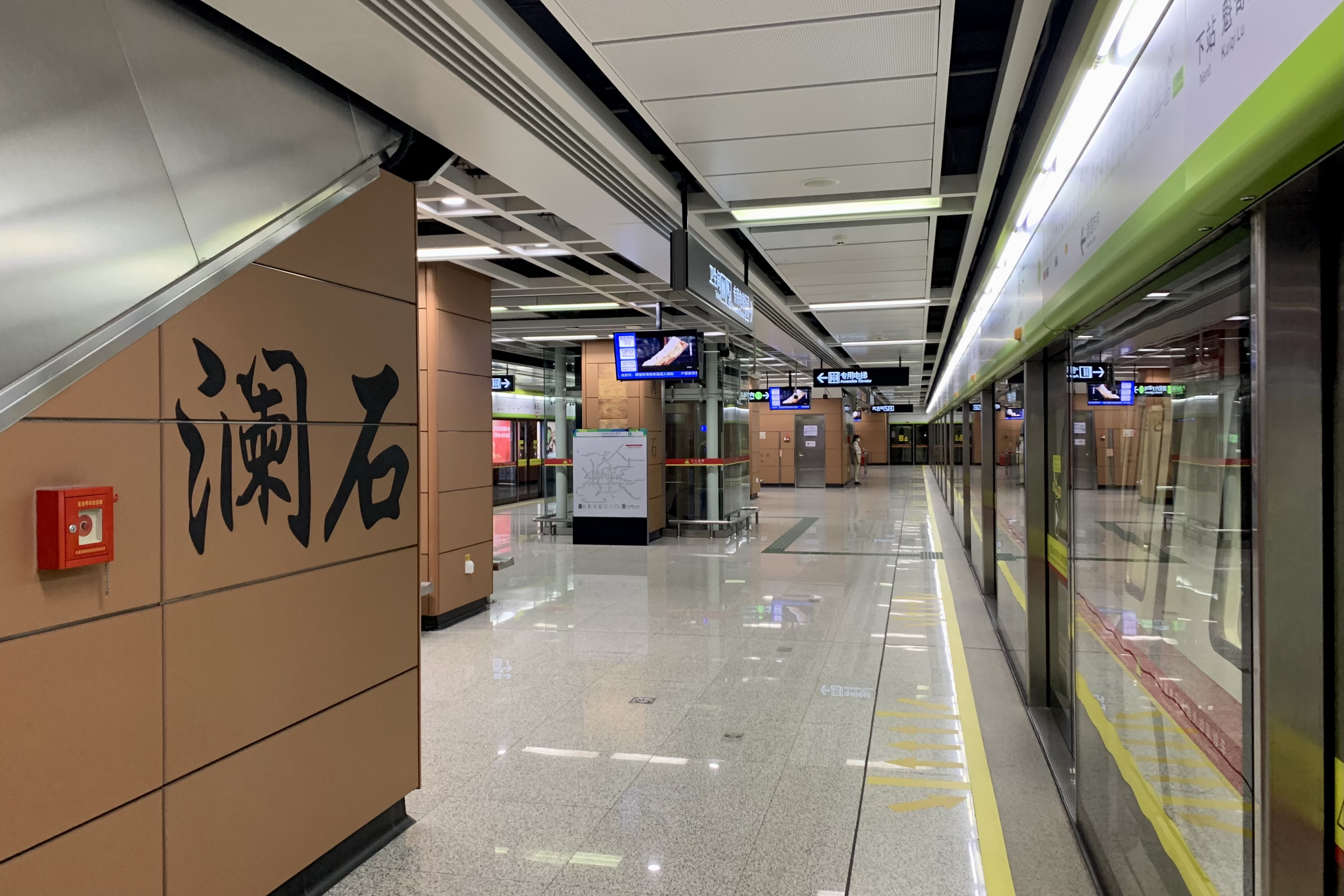

Chinese name
- Simplified Chinese: 澜石站
- Traditional Chinese: 瀾石站
Transcriptions
Standard Mandarin
- Hanyu Pinyin: Lánshí Zhàn
Yue: Cantonese
- Jyutping: laan^{4}sek^{6} zaam^{6}

General information
- Location: South Fenjiang Road (汾江南路) south of Lanshi No. 1 Road (澜石一路); Chancheng District, Foshan, Guangdong; China
- Operated by: Guangzhou Metro Co. Ltd.
- Line: Guangfo line

Other information
- Station code: GF04

History
- Opened: 28 December 2016; 9 years ago

Services
Preceding station	Foshan Metro	Following station
Shijilian towards Xincheng Dong	Guangfo Line	Kuiqi Lu towards Lijiao
Location

Lanshi station (Chinese: 澜石站) is a station of Guangfo line of the Foshan Metro and Guangzhou Metro in Foshan's Chancheng District. It started operations on 28 December 2016.

== Station layout ==
G	-	Exits
L1; Concourse	Lobby	Customer Service, Shops, Vending machines
L2; Platforms	Platform 2	Guangfo towards Xincheng Dong (Shijilian)
L2; Platforms	Island platform, doors will open on the left
L2; Platforms	Platform 1	Guangfo towards Lijiao (Kuiqi Lu)

== Exits ==
Exit number	Exit location
Exit A	Fenjiang Nanlu
Exit B	Fenjiang Nanlu
Exit C	Fenjiang Nanlu
