= Shijilian station =

Guangfo Metro station in Foshan

Coordinates: 22°57′55″N 113°06′54″E

Shijilian 世纪莲
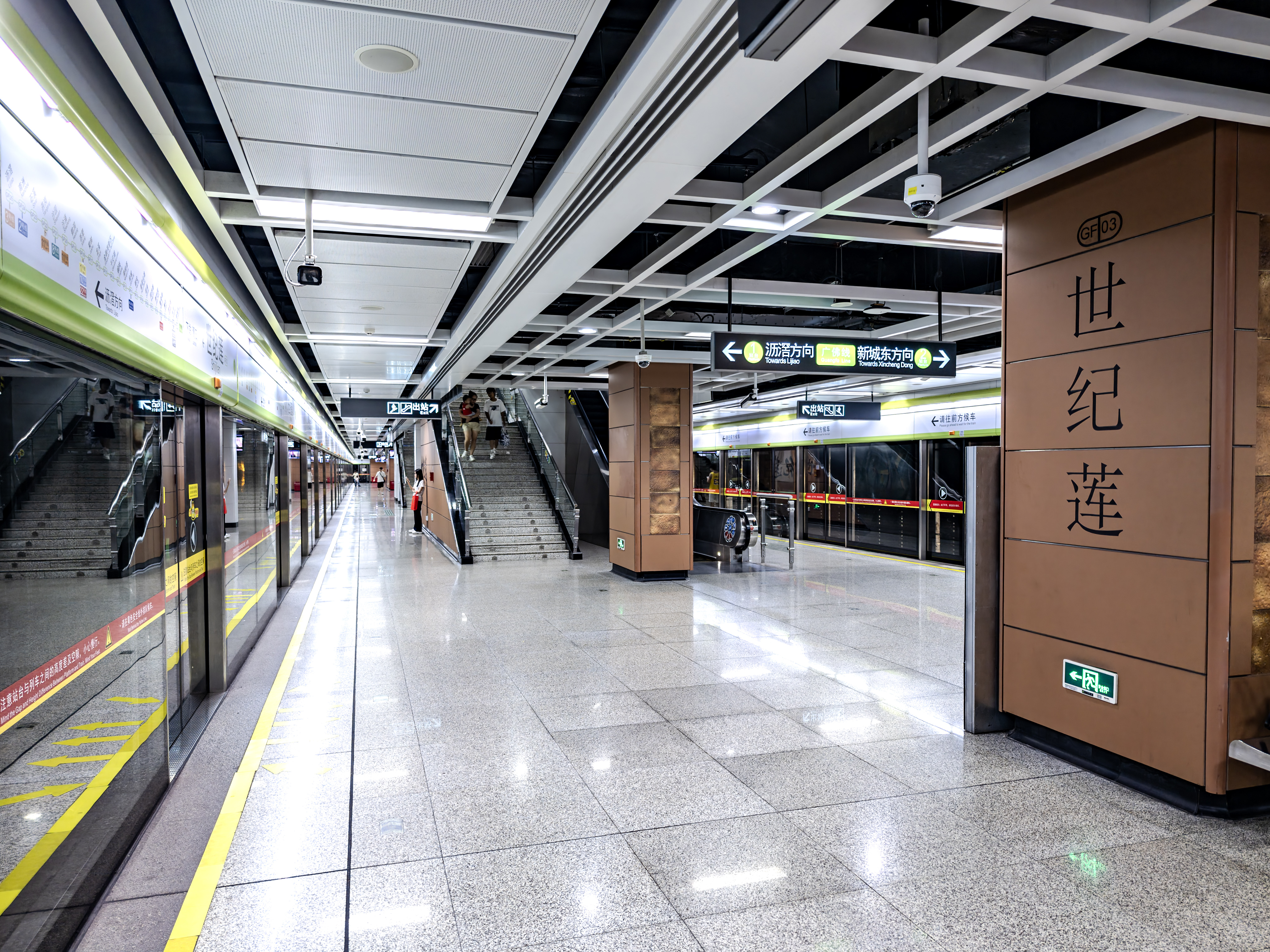

Chinese name
- Simplified Chinese: 世纪莲站
- Traditional Chinese: 世紀蓮站
Transcriptions
Standard Mandarin
- Hanyu Pinyin: Shìjìlián Zhàn
Yue: Cantonese
- Jyutping: sai^{3}gei^{2}lin^{4} zaam^{6}

General information
- Location: Yuhe Road (裕和路) and Jixiang Street (吉祥道); Shunde District, Foshan, Guangdong; China
- Operated by: Guangzhou Metro Co. Ltd.
- Line: Guangfo line

Other information
- Station code: GF03

History
- Opened: 28 December 2016; 9 years ago

Services
Preceding station	Foshan Metro	Following station
Dongping towards Xincheng Dong	Guangfo Line	Lanshi towards Lijiao
Location

Shijilian station (Chinese: 世纪莲站) is a station of Guangfo line of the Foshan Metro and Guangzhou Metro in Foshan's Shunde District. It started operations on 28 December 2016. The station is named after Century Lotus Stadium.

== Station layout ==
G	-	Exits
L1; Concourse	Lobby	Customer Service, Shops, Vending machines
L2; Platforms	Platform 2	Guangfo towards Xincheng Dong (Dongping)
L2; Platforms	Island platform, doors will open on the left
L2; Platforms	Platform 1	Guangfo towards Lijiao (Lanshi)

== Exits ==
Exit number	Exit location
Exit A	Yuhe Lu
Exit B	Jixiang Dao
Exit C	Yuhe Lu
Exit D	Yuhe Lu
