= Dongping station =

Guangfo Metro and Foshan Metro Line 3 station

Dongping 东平
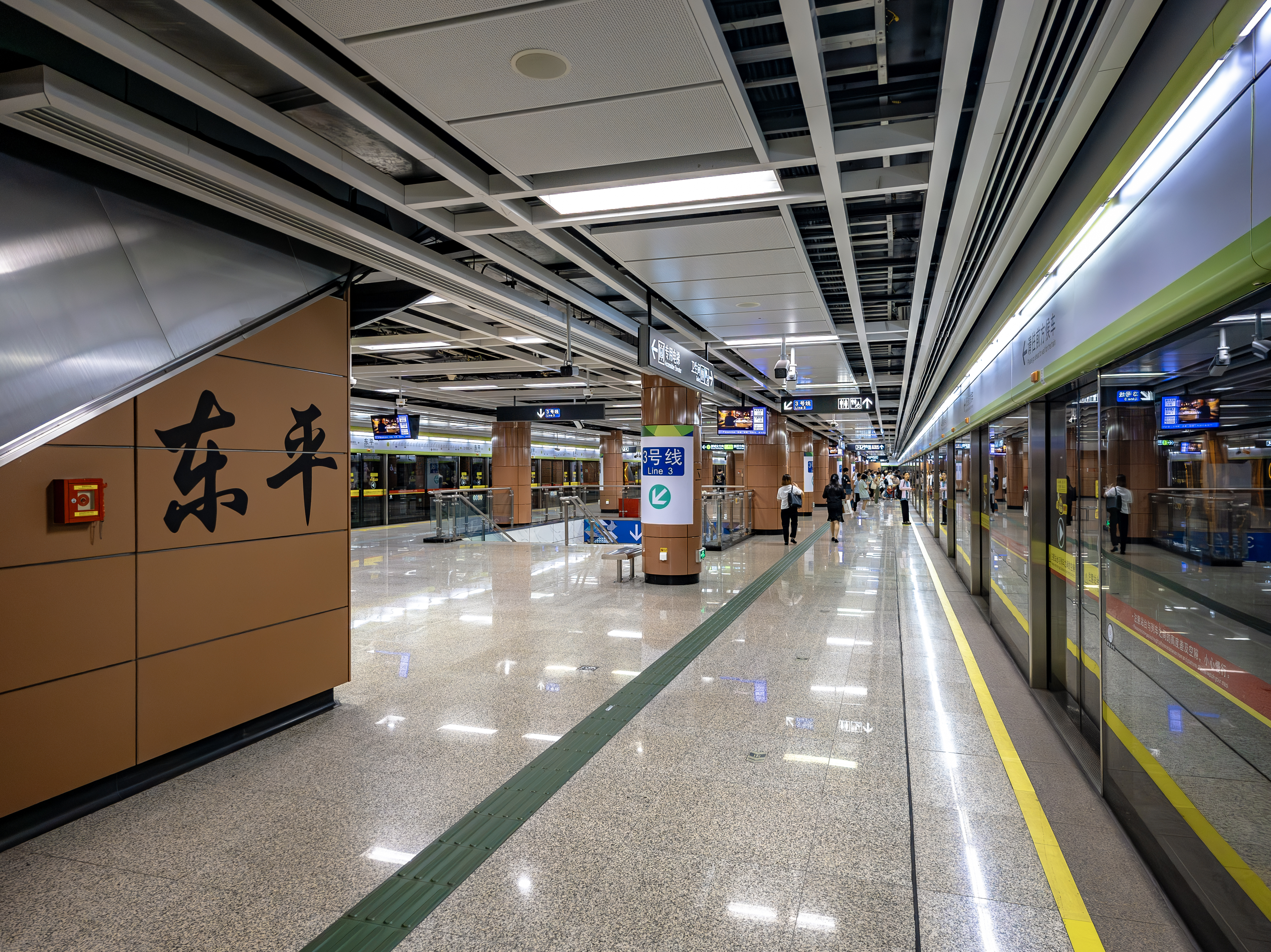
- Guangfo Line platform

Chinese name
- Simplified Chinese: 东平站
- Traditional Chinese: 東平站
Transcriptions
Standard Mandarin
- Hanyu Pinyin: Dōngpíng Zhàn
Yue: Cantonese
- Yale Romanization: Dūngpìng Jaahm
- Jyutping: Dung^{1}ping^{4} Zaam^{6}

General information
- Location: Yuhe Road (裕和路) east of South Wenhua Road (文华南路); Shunde District, Foshan, Guangdong; China
- Coordinates: 22°58′3.36″N 113°7′25.28″E
- Operator: Guangzhou Metro Co. Ltd.
- Lines: Guangfo line Line 3
- Platforms: 4 (2 island platforms)
- Tracks: 4
- Connections: Shunde North

Construction
- Structure type: Underground
- Platform levels: 2
- Accessible: Yes

Other information
- Station code: GF02 F319

History
- Opened: Guangfo line: 28 December 2016 (9 years ago); Line 3: 28 December 2022 (3 years ago)

Services
Preceding station	Foshan Metro	Following station
Xincheng Dong Terminus	Guangfo Line	Shijilian towards Lijiao
Wanhua towards Foshan University	Line 3	Dadun towards Shunde College Railway Station
Transfer at Shunde North
Preceding station	Pearl River Delta Metropolitan Region Intercity Railway	Following station
Zhangcha towards Zhaoqing	Guangzhou–Zhaoqing intercity railway transfer at Shunde North	Beijiao West towards Panyu
Location

Dongping station (simplified Chinese: 东平站; traditional Chinese: 東平站; pinyin: Dōngpíng Zhàn; Cantonese Yale: Dūngpìng Jaahm) is an interchange station between the Guangfo line (FMetro Line 1) and Line 3 of the Foshan Metro. It is located in Foshan's Shunde District. Guangfo Line started operations on 28 December 2016. Line 3 started operations on 28 December 2022.

== Station structure ==
=== Platform layout ===
The station has three underground floors. The ground level is the exit, and it is surrounded by Yuhe Road, Wenhua South Road and other nearby buildings. The first floor is the concourse, the second floor is the Guangfo line platform, and the third floor is the Line 3 platform.

G	-	Exits A, B, C, E, F
L1; Concourse	Guangfo 3 Upper concourse	Ticket Machines, Customer Service, Shops, Police Station, Security Facilities; Transfer passage towards Shunde North railway station
L2; Platforms	Platform 2	Guangfo towards Xincheng Dong (Terminus)
L2; Platforms	Island platform, doors will open on the left (Toilets)
L2; Platforms	Platform 1	Guangfo towards Lijiao (Shijilian)
L2; Platforms	3 Lower concourse	Ticket Machines, Customer Service
	Mezzanine	Transfer level between Guangfo and 3 platforms
L3; Platforms	Platform 3	3 towards Foshan University (Wanhua)
L3; Platforms	Island platform, doors will open on the left (Toilets, Nursery)
L3; Platforms	Platform 4	3 towards Shunde College Railway Station (Dadun)

=== Concourse ===
The station has two concourse levels, the first basement floor is the upper concourse shared by Guangfo line and Line 3, and the second basement floor is the lower concourse dedicated to Line 3. Both concourses are equipped with ticket machines, automatic card vending and recharge machines, customer service centers and other facilities.

The concourse and platform of the Guangfo line are decorated with the unified brown ceramic plates like all other Guangfo line stations. At the same time, as one of the characteristic stations of the initial section of Line 3, the overall decoration of the extension of Line 3 extracts lotus and water ripple elements. The Line 3 section of the upper concourse is a hollow design atrium, and its ceiling is painted with the "Qingming River Map" mural.

The south side of the Guangfo line part of the upper concourse and the north side of the lower concourse are divided into fare-paid areas, where elevators, escalators, and stairs are installed for passengers to access the platforms. On the east side of the Guangfo line concourse, a separate fare-paid area is divided for passengers using the elevator connecting to the Guangfo line platform.

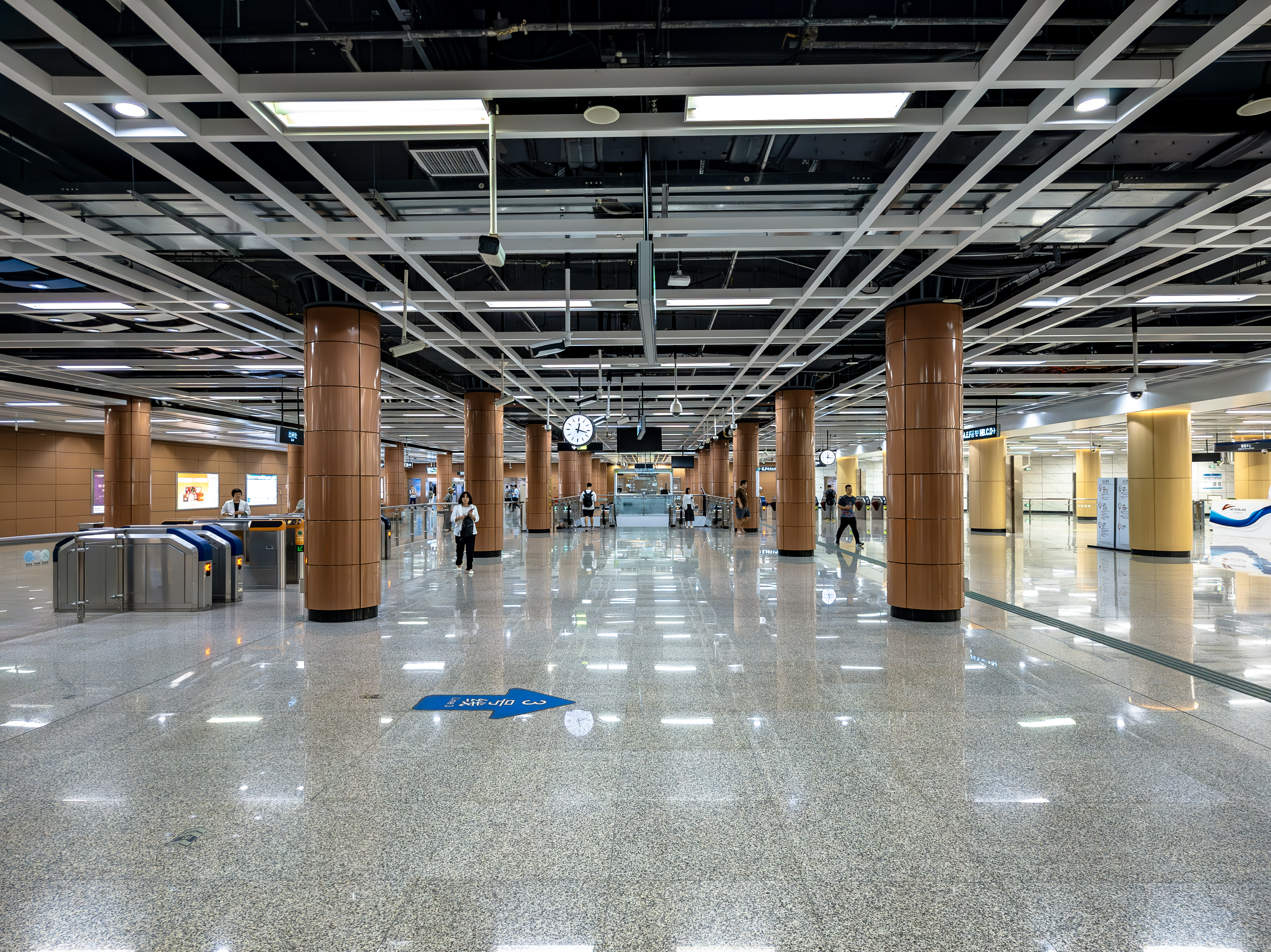
Guangfo line concourse

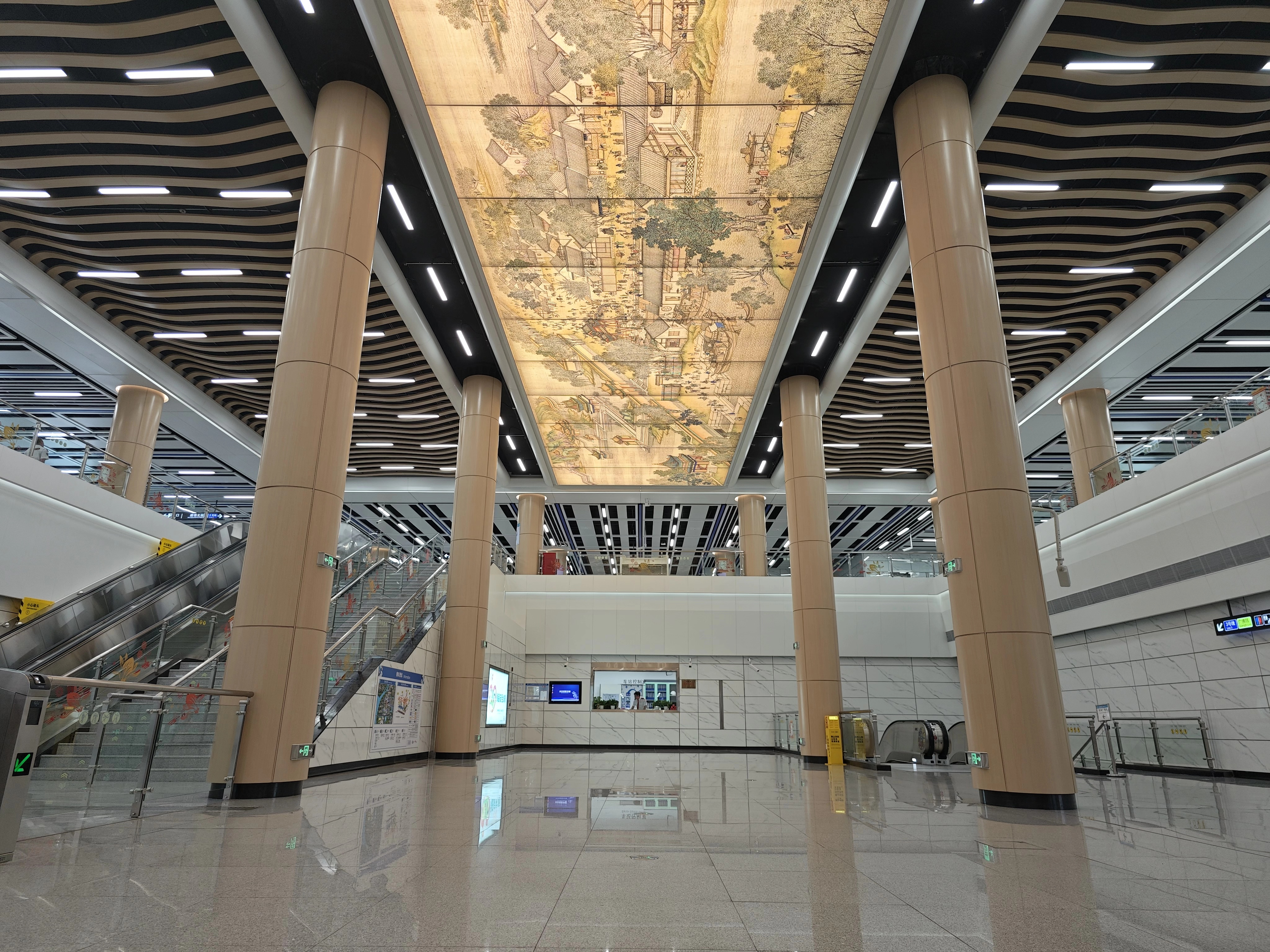
Line 3 lower concourse

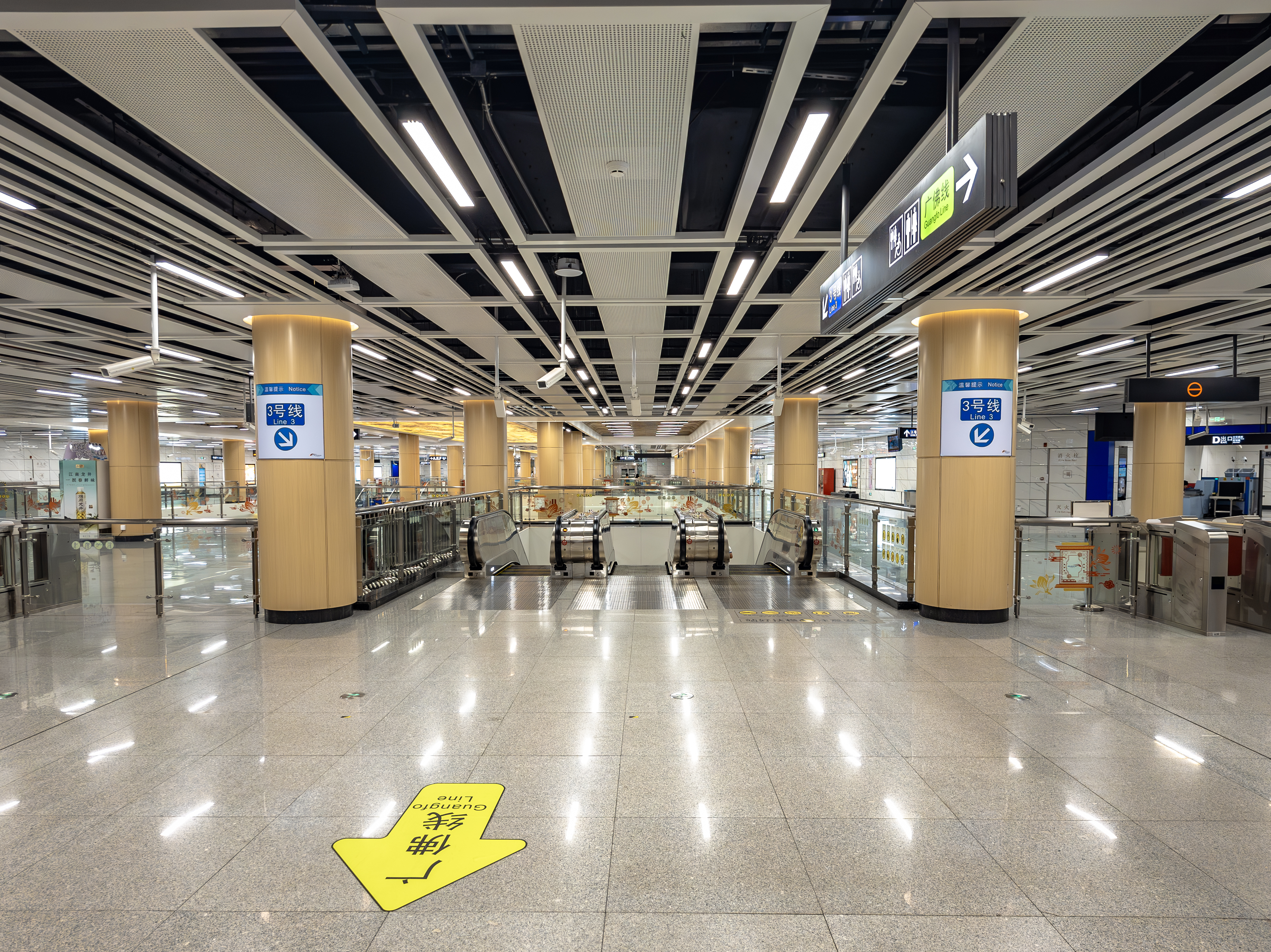
Line 3 upper concourse

=== Platform and transfer ===
The Guangfo line has an underground island platform located under Yuhe Road, and Line 3 has an underground island platform located under Wenhua South Road. The two lines intersect in the shape of a "T", with the Guangfo Line platform on the upper level and the Line 3 platform on the lower level.

For transfers, the two lines can be transferred through the interchange mezzanine connecting the platforms, and transfer is also available via the upper concourse. In addition, the platforms feature toilets, which are located at the west end of the Guangfo Line platform and the south end of the platform of Line 3 respectively. There is also a nursery room near the toilet on the Line 3 platform.

=== Entrances/exits ===
The station has 6 points of entry/exit. Exits A-C opened with the Guangfo line, whilst Exits D-F opened with Line 3. Exit D was closed since 21 February 2025. Exit C is equipped with an elevator. In addition, there is a transfer passage connecting to the intercity Shunde North railway station.

- A: Yuhe Road
- B: Yuhe Road
- C: Yuhe Road
- E: Wenhua South Road
- F: Yuhe Road
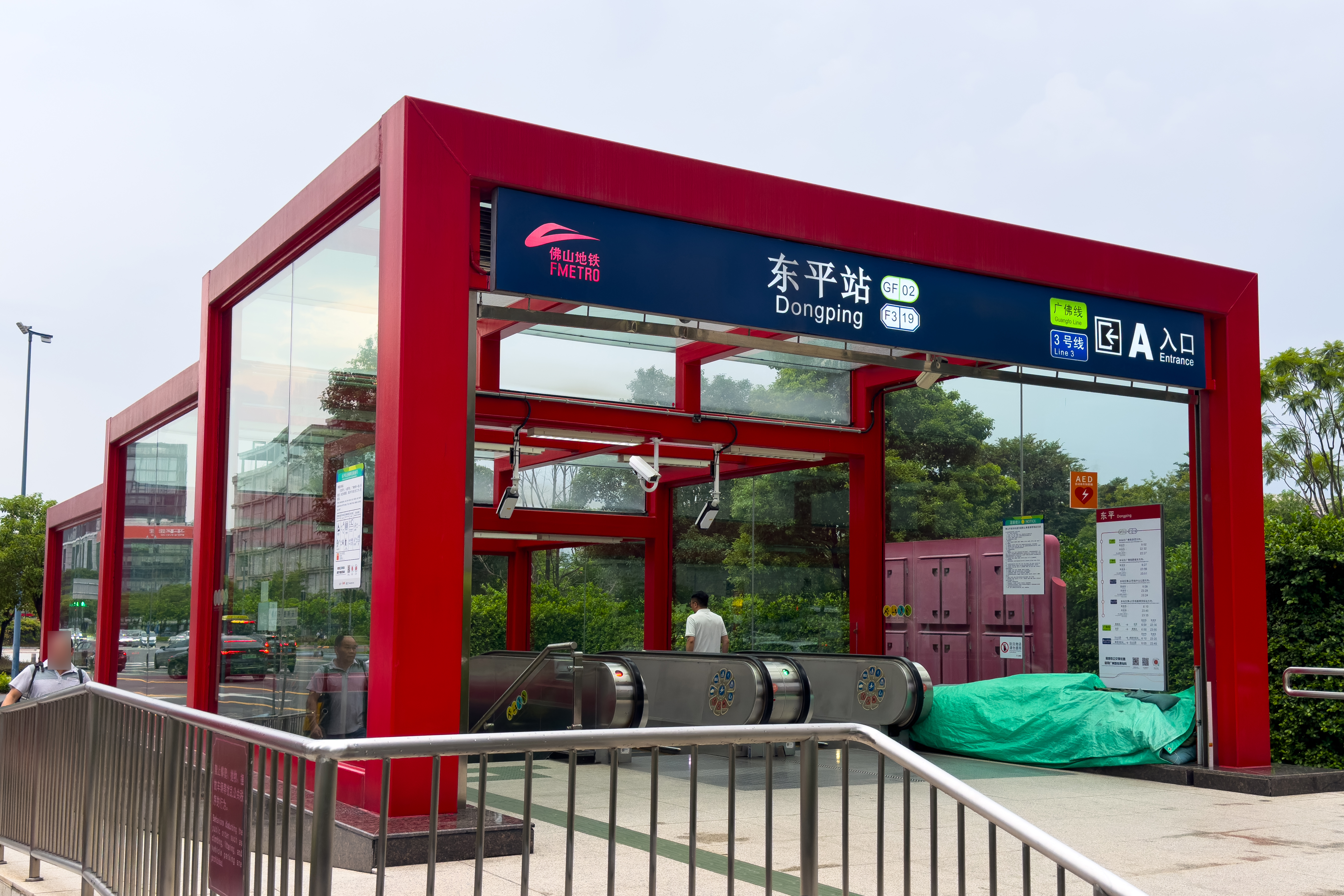
Entrance A

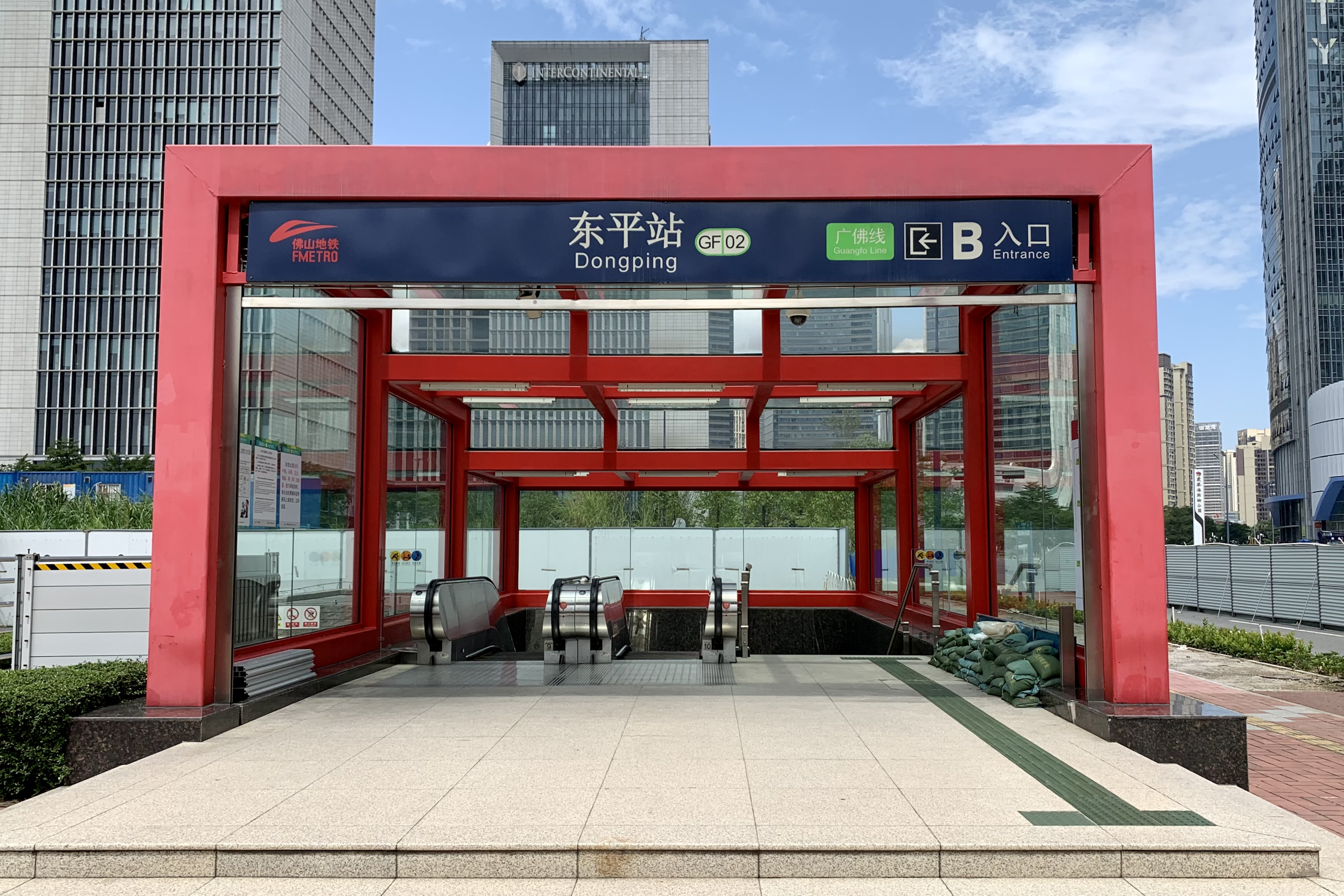
Entrance B

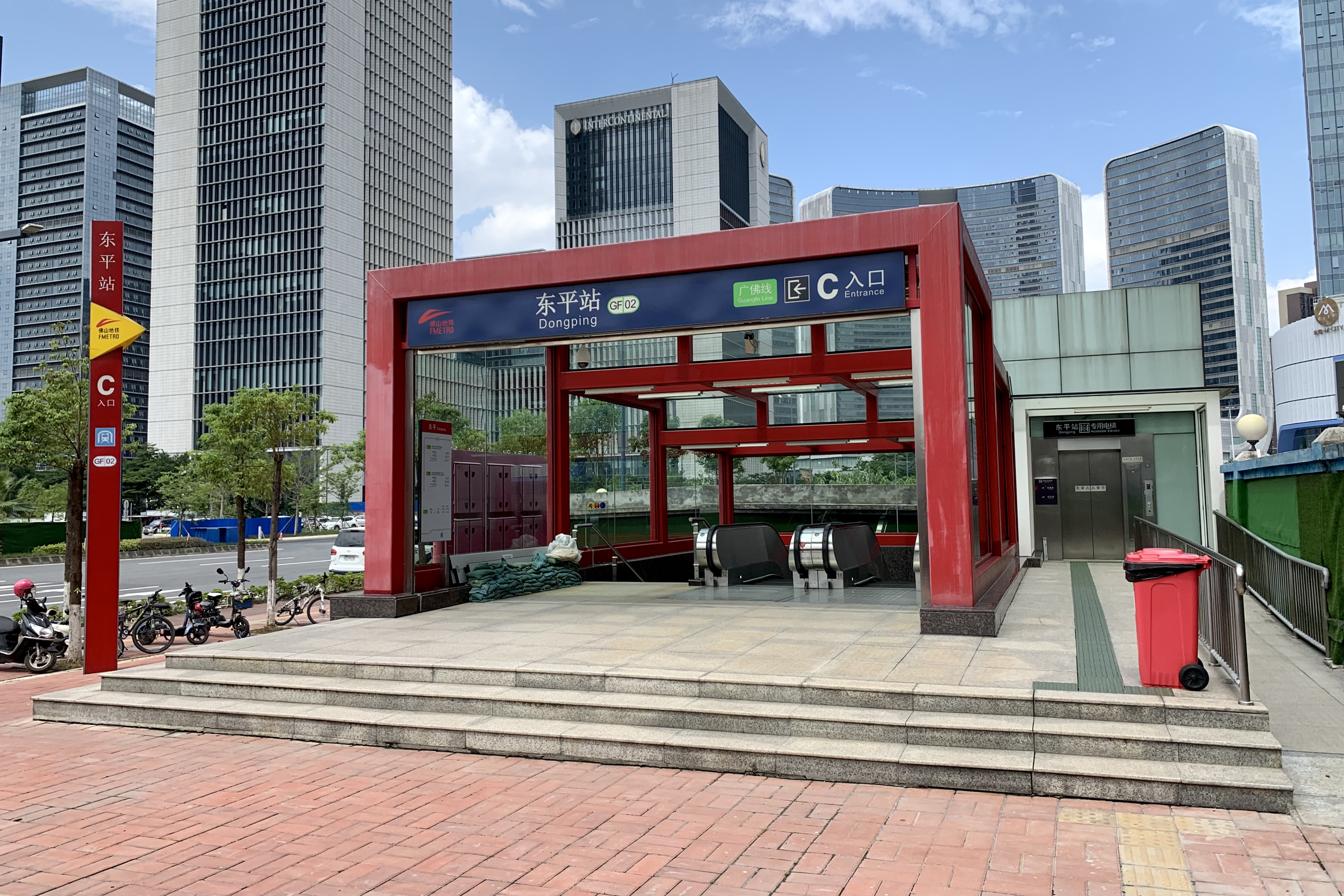
Entrance C

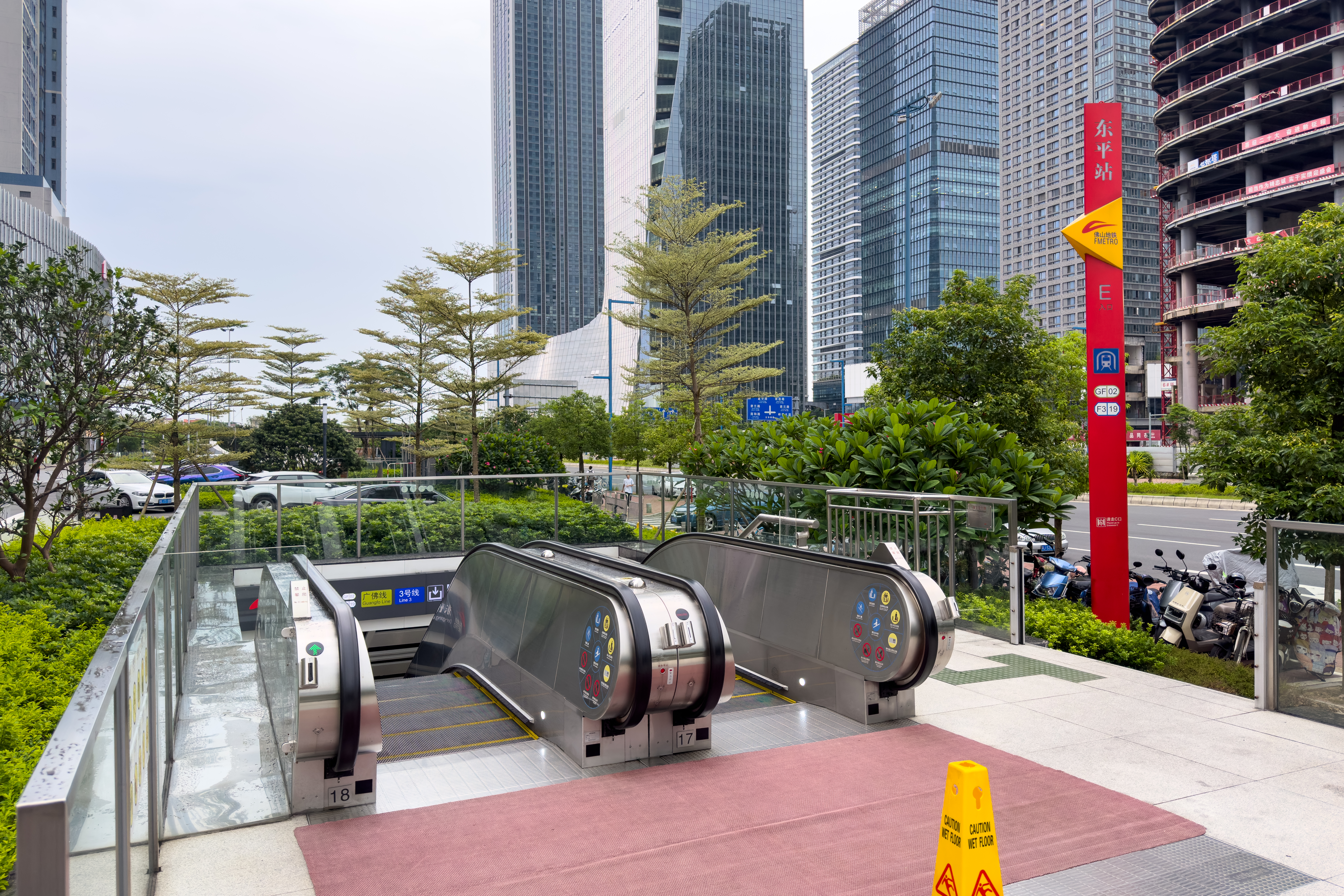
Entrance E

== Gallery ==
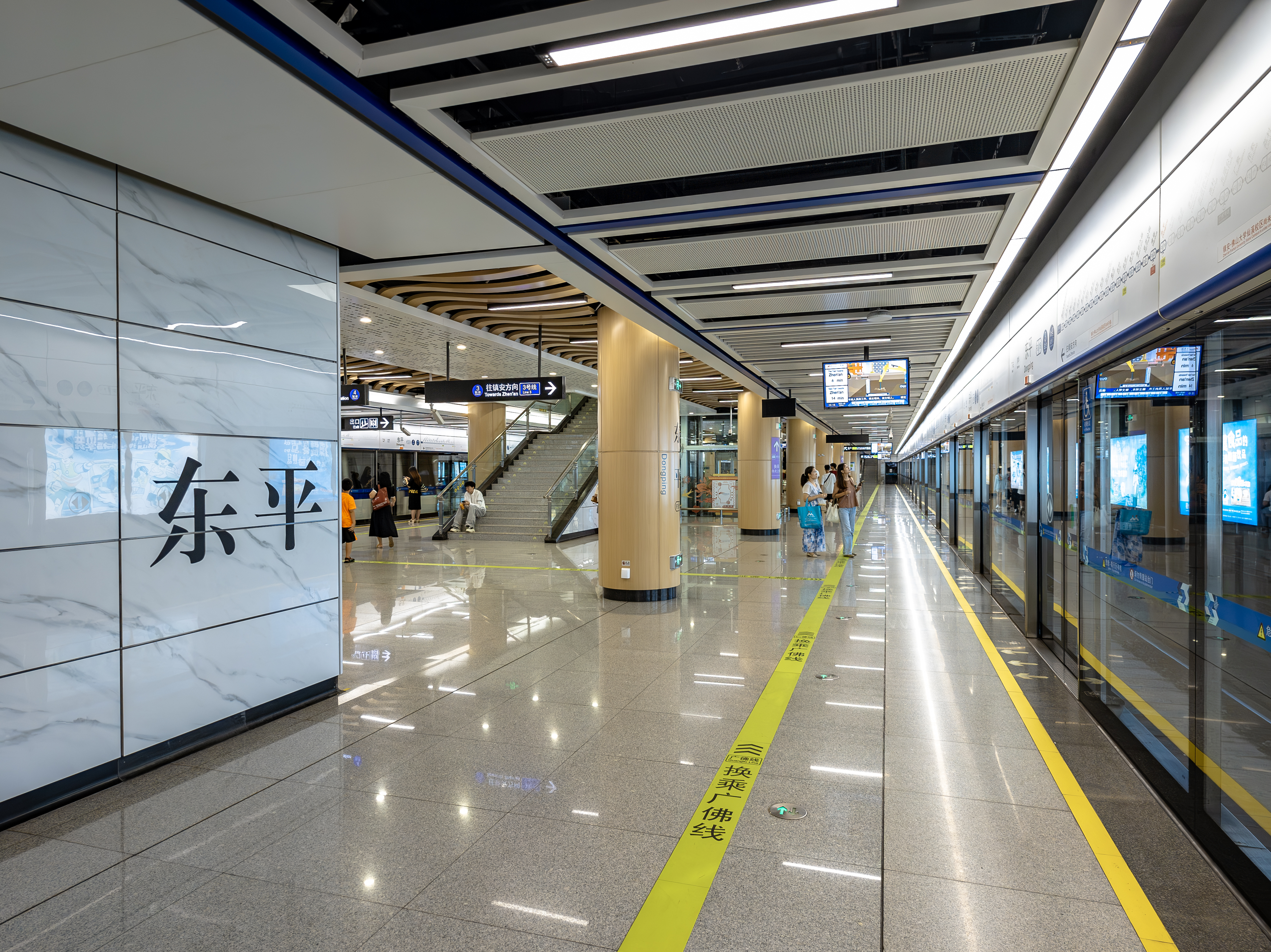
Line 3 platform

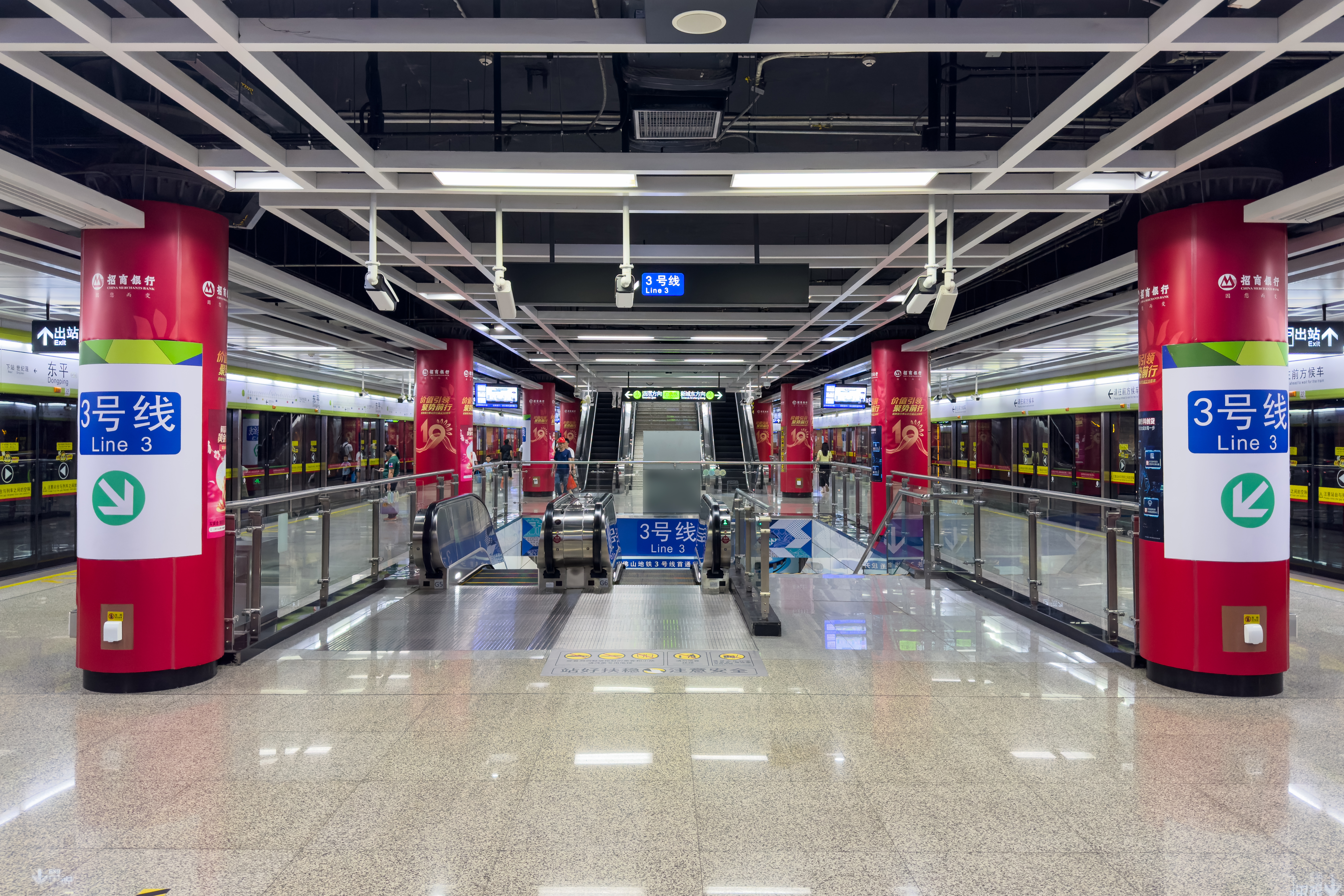
Interchange node from Guangfo line platform

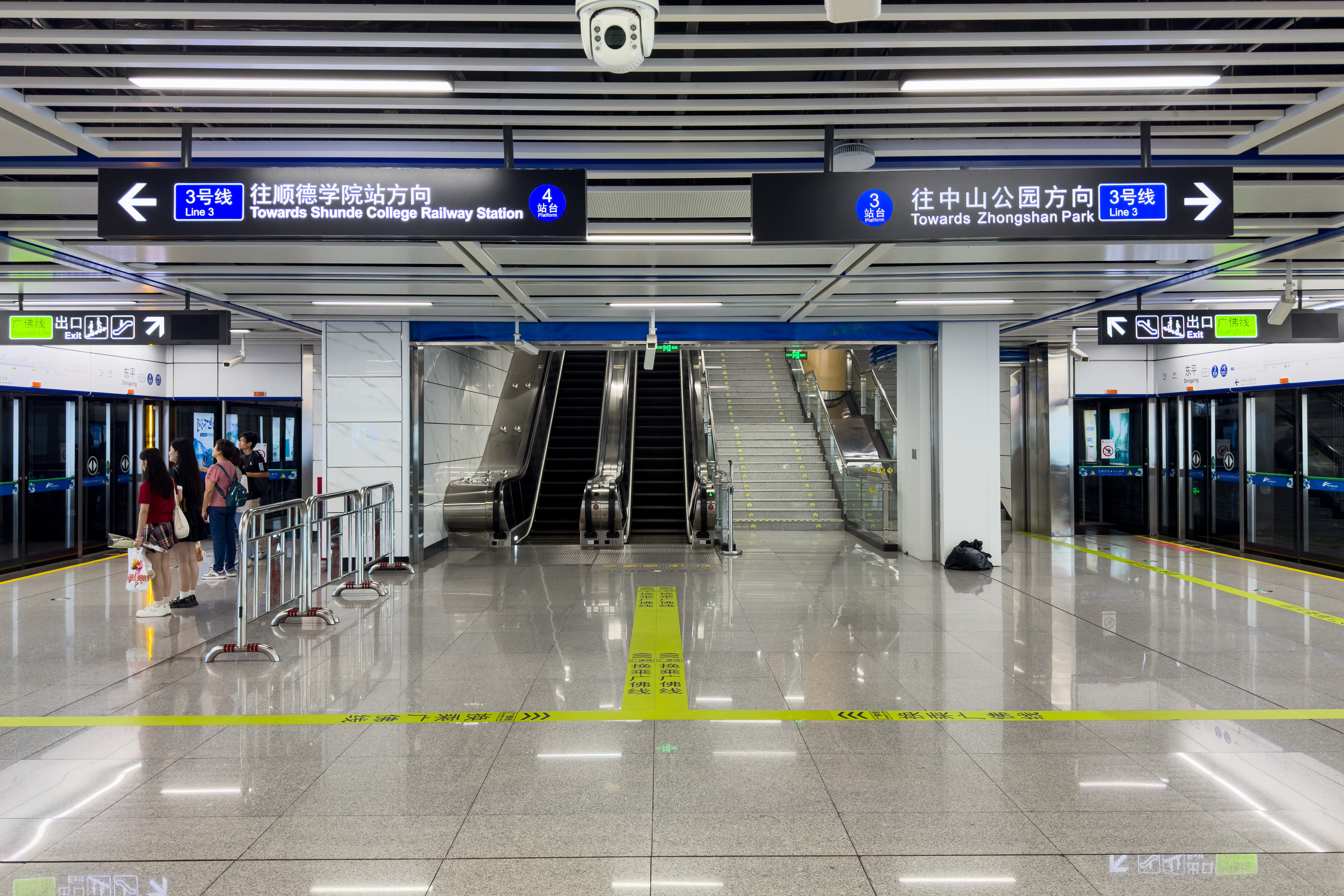
Interchange node from Line 3 platform

== History ==
The Guangfo line station was topped out on 10 February 2015. On 28 December 2016, the station opened with the opening of Guangfo line phase 2. On 28 December 2022, Line 3 opened, and the station became a transfer station.

== Future development ==
=== Foshan Metro Line 6 ===
In the future, the Xincheng Dong-Shijilian section, including this station, will be separated from the Guangfo Metro and extended at both ends to form Foshan Metro Line 6 for independent operation. After the line is implemented and completed, this station will be changed to a station of Foshan Line 6 in the future and will no longer belong to the Guangfo line.

=== Guangzhou Metro Line 28 ===
The station for the initial phase of Guangzhou Metro Line 28 (Fosuiguan Intercity) is expected to be located on the east side of Huazhang Road and Foshan News Center, and there will be a transfer passageway set up via the concourse.
