= Guangfo line =

Inter-city line of the Guangzhou Metro and Foshan Metro

Coordinates: 23.0660°N 113.2047°E

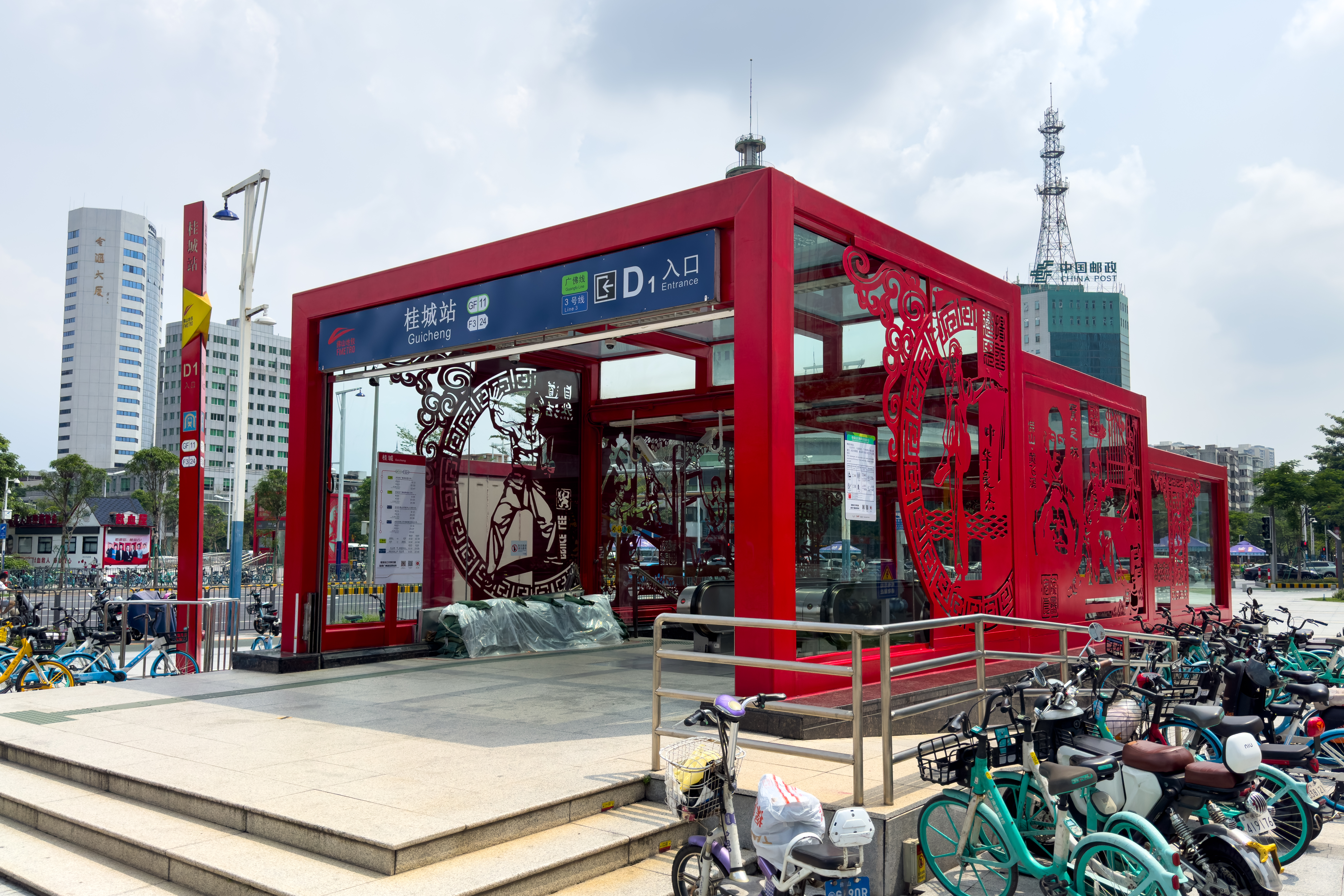
- The D1 entrance/exit of Guicheng

Overview
- Other name(s): Guangfo Metro; Line 1 of Foshan Metro
- Status: Operational
- Owner: Phase I: Guangdong Guangfo Metro Co., Ltd. Phase II: Foshan Rail Transit Development Co., Ltd.
- Locale: Foshan (Shunde, Chancheng and Nanhai districts) and Guangzhou (Liwan and Haizhu districts); Guangdong
- Termini: Xincheng Dong; Lijiao
- Stations: 25

Service
- Type: Rapid transit, Intercity rail
- System: Guangzhou Metro; Foshan Metro
- Services: 1
- Operator: Guangzhou Metro Corporation
- Daily ridership: 557,000 (2025 daily average); 759,000 (31 December 2025 Peak)

History
- Opened: 3 November 2010 (15 years ago)
- Last extension: 18 December 2018 (7 years ago)

Technical
- Line length: 39.6 km (24.61 mi)
- Number of tracks: Double-track
- Character: Underground
- Track gauge: 1,435 mm (4 ft 8 1/2 in) standard gauge
- Electrification: 1,500 V DC (Overhead lines)
- Operating speed: 80 km/h (50 mph)
- Signalling: Siemens Trainguard MT Moving block CBTC

Guangfo line
- Simplified Chinese: 广佛线
- Traditional Chinese: 廣佛線
Transcriptions
Standard Mandarin
- Hanyu Pinyin: Guǎngfó Xiàn
Yue: Cantonese
- Yale Romanization: Gwóngfaht Sin
- Jyutping: gwong^{2}fat^{6} sin^{3}

Guangfo Metro
- Simplified Chinese: 广佛地铁
- Traditional Chinese: 廣佛地鐵
Transcriptions
Standard Mandarin
- Hanyu Pinyin: Guǎngfó Dìtiě
Yue: Cantonese
- Yale Romanization: Gwóngfaht Deihtit
- Jyutping: gwong^{2}fat^{6} dei^{6}tit^{3}

FMetro line 1
- Simplified Chinese: 佛山地铁1号线
- Traditional Chinese: 佛山地鐵1號線
Transcriptions
Standard Mandarin
- Hanyu Pinyin: Fóshān Dìtiě Yī Hào Xiàn
Yue: Cantonese
- Yale Romanization: Fahtsàan / Fahtsāan Deihtit Yāt Houh Sin
- Jyutping: fat^{6}saan^{1} dei^{6}tit^{3} jat^{1} hou^{6} sin^{3}

Guangzhou–Foshan intercity railway
- Simplified Chinese: 广佛城际轨道交通
- Traditional Chinese: 廣佛城際軌道交通
Transcriptions
Standard Mandarin
- Hanyu Pinyin: Guǎngfó Chéngjì Guǐdào Jiāotōng
Yue: Cantonese
- Jyutping: gwong^{2}fat^{6} sing^{4}zai^{3} gwai^{2}dou^{6} gaau^{1}tung^{1}

The Guangfo line or Guangfo Metro or Foshan Metro Line 1 is an intercity metro line in China that connects the cities of Foshan and Guangzhou in Guangdong province. As of December 2018, the line is 39.6 km (24.61 mi) long and has 25 stations, all underground. Guangfo Line is the first intercity metro line in China that span two cities: Guangzhou and Foshan, and has become a "golden corridor" for the integrated development of the Guangdong-Hong Kong-Macao Greater Bay Area.

== History ==
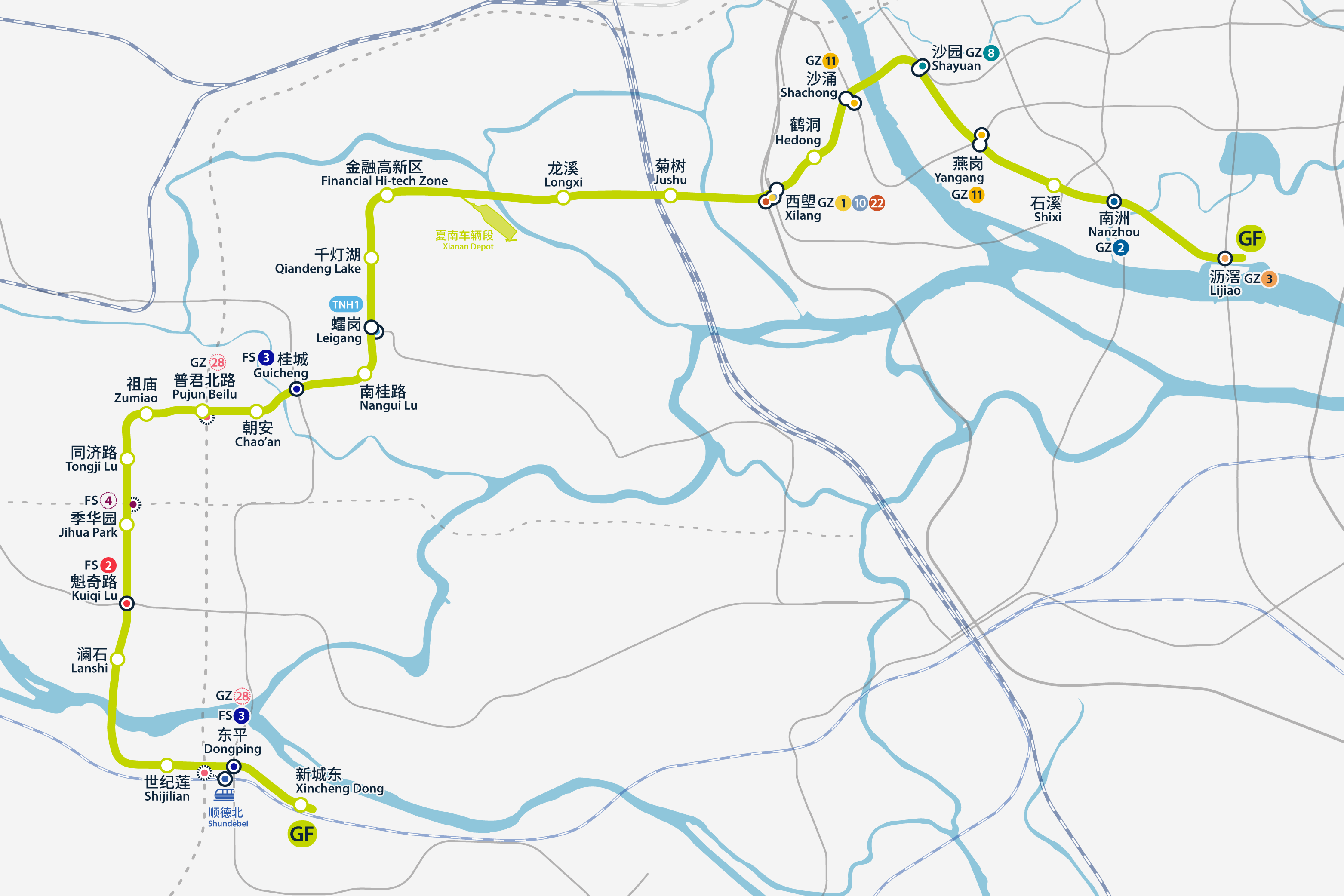
Map of Guangfo Line

The line was expected to start construction in 2002 with a tentative opening in 2009. However, due to capital shortage, its construction was claimed to be suspended until it resumed in 2007. The section between Kuiqi Lu and Xilang was completed in 2010. The Xilang–Yangang section began operation on December 28, 2015. The section between Yangang and Lijiao was completed in 2018.

Since 24 April 2016, Wi-Fi is available across the entire line.

== Opening timeline ==
Segment	Commencement	Length	Station(s)	Name
Kuiqi Lu — Xilang	3 November 2010	20.4 km (12.68 mi)	14	Phase 1 (1st section)
Xilang — Yangang	28 December 2015	7.3 km (4.54 mi)	4	Phase 1 (2nd section)
Xincheng Dong — Kuiqi Lu	28 December 2016	6.7 km (4.16 mi)	4	Phase 2
Yangang — Lijiao	28 December 2018	5.5 km (3.42 mi)	3	Phase 1 (3rd section)

== Stations ==
Station No.	Station name		Connections	Future Connections	Distance km		Location	
Station No.	English	Chinese	Connections	Future Connections	Distance km		Location	
GF01	Xincheng Dong	新城东			0.00	0.00	Shunde	Foshan
GF02	Dongping	东平	3 F319; SVA	28	1.52	1.52	Shunde	Foshan
GF03	Shijilian	世纪莲			1.46	2.98	Shunde	Foshan
GF04	Lanshi	澜石			2.71	5.69	Chancheng	Foshan
GF05	Kuiqi Lu	魁奇路	2 F218		1.16	6.85	Chancheng	Foshan
GF06	Jihua Park	季华园		4 (Note: Will require an out-of-system interchange.)	1.44	8.29	Chancheng	Foshan
GF07	Tongji Lu	同济路			1.30	9.59	Chancheng	Foshan
GF08	Zumiao	祖庙			1.19	10.78	Chancheng	Foshan
GF09	Pujun Beilu	普君北路		28	1.03	11.81	Chancheng	Foshan
GF10	Chao'an	朝安			1.15	12.96	Chancheng	Foshan
GF11	Guicheng	桂城	3 F324		0.86	13.82	Nanhai	Foshan
GF12	Nangui Lu	南桂路			1.33	15.15	Nanhai	Foshan
GF13	Leigang	𧒽岗	TNH1 TNH101 (OSI)		1.14	16.29	Nanhai	Foshan
GF14	Qiandeng Lake	千灯湖			1.27	17.56	Nanhai	Foshan
GF15	Financial Hi-Tech Zone	金融高新区			1.42	18.98	Nanhai	Foshan
GF16	Longxi	龙溪			3.49	22.47	Liwan	Guangzhou
GF17	Jushu	菊树			2.09	24.56	Liwan	Guangzhou
GF18	Xilang	西塱	1 101 10 1001 22 2207		2.08	26.64	Liwan	Guangzhou
GF19	Hedong	鹤洞			1.25	27.89	Liwan	Guangzhou
GF20	Shachong	沙涌	11 1122		1.34	29.23	Liwan	Guangzhou
GF21	Shayuan	沙园	8 817		1.75	30.98	Haizhu	Guangzhou
GF22	Yangang	燕岗	11 1125		1.81	32.79	Haizhu	Guangzhou
GF23	Shixi	石溪			1.67	34.46	Haizhu	Guangzhou
GF24	Nanzhou	南洲	2 206		1.28	35.74	Haizhu	Guangzhou
GF25	Lijiao	沥滘	3 306		2.58	38.32	Haizhu	Guangzhou

== Rolling stock ==
Internal Code	Series	Manufacturer	Time of manufacturing	Sets	Assembly	Purchaser
Phase I (B3)	DKZ29	CNR Changchun	2009-2011	27	Tc+Mp+Mp+Tc	Guangdong Guangfo Metro
Phase II (B3-I)	SFM27	CRRC Sifang	2015	6	Tc+Mp+Mp+Tc	Foshan Railway Investment & Construction Group
Additional Purchased	SFM77	CRRC Sifang	2019-2020	18	Tc+Mp+Mp+Tc	Guangdong Guangfo Metro

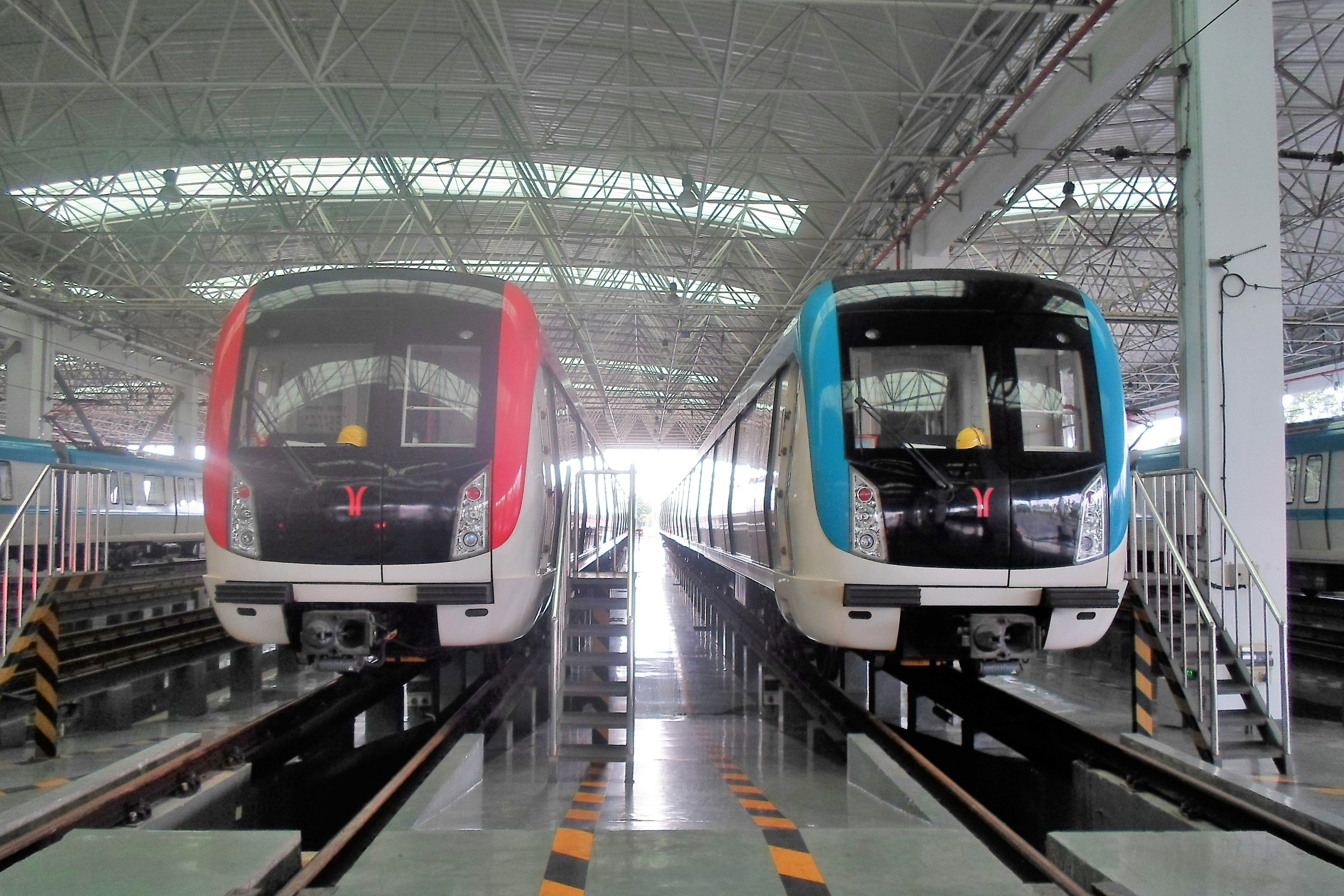
Two B3 trains at the depot

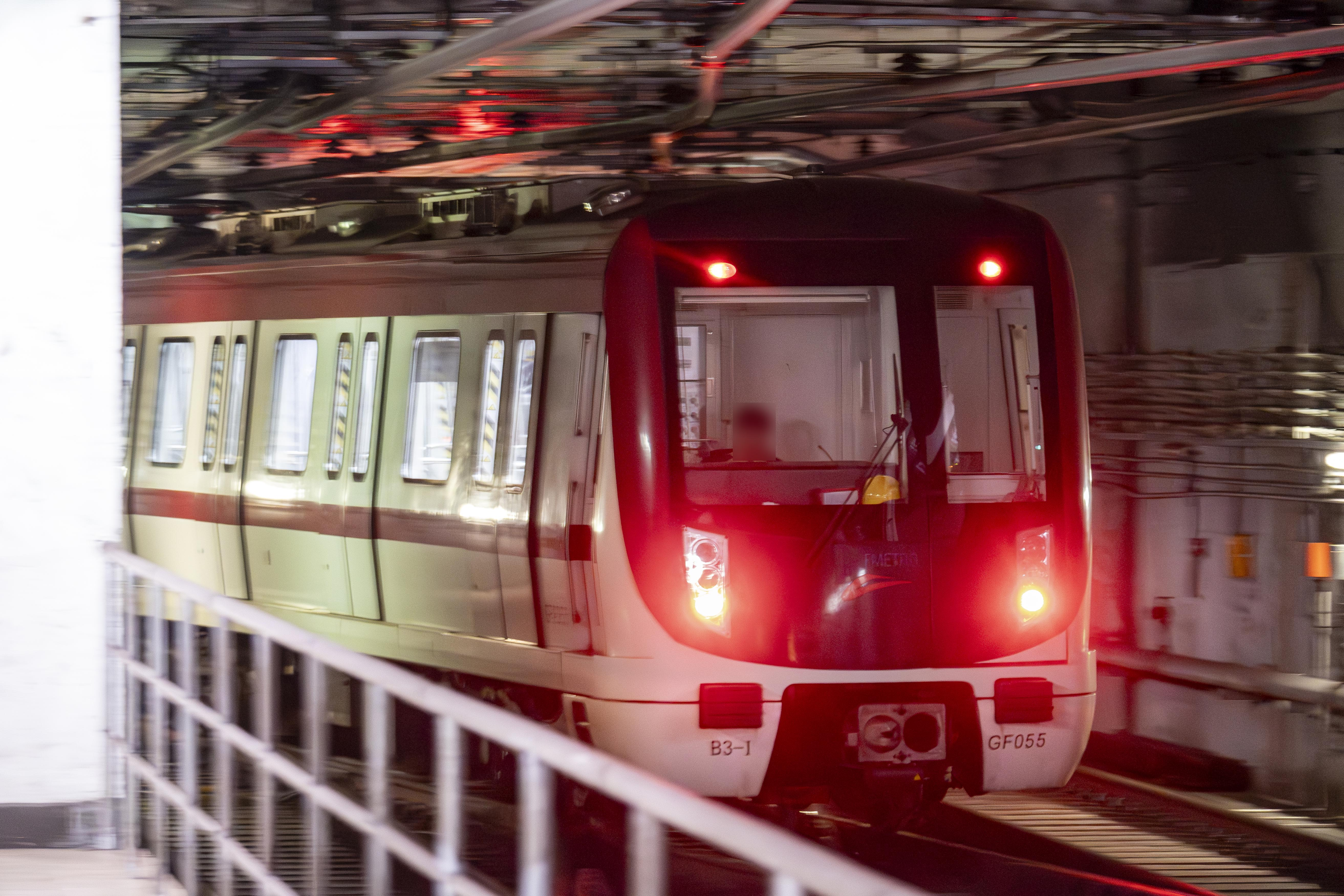
B3-I train

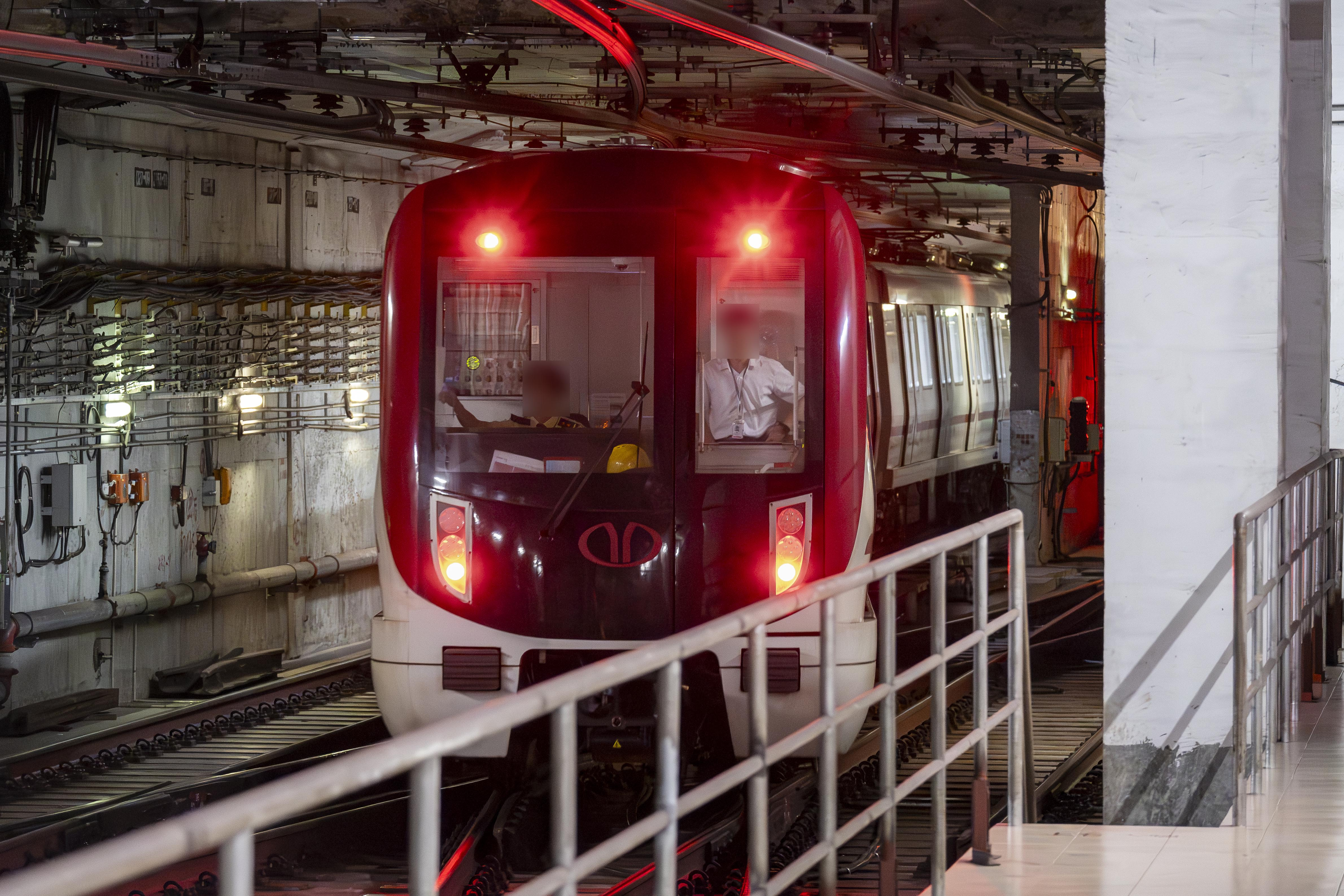
B3-II train

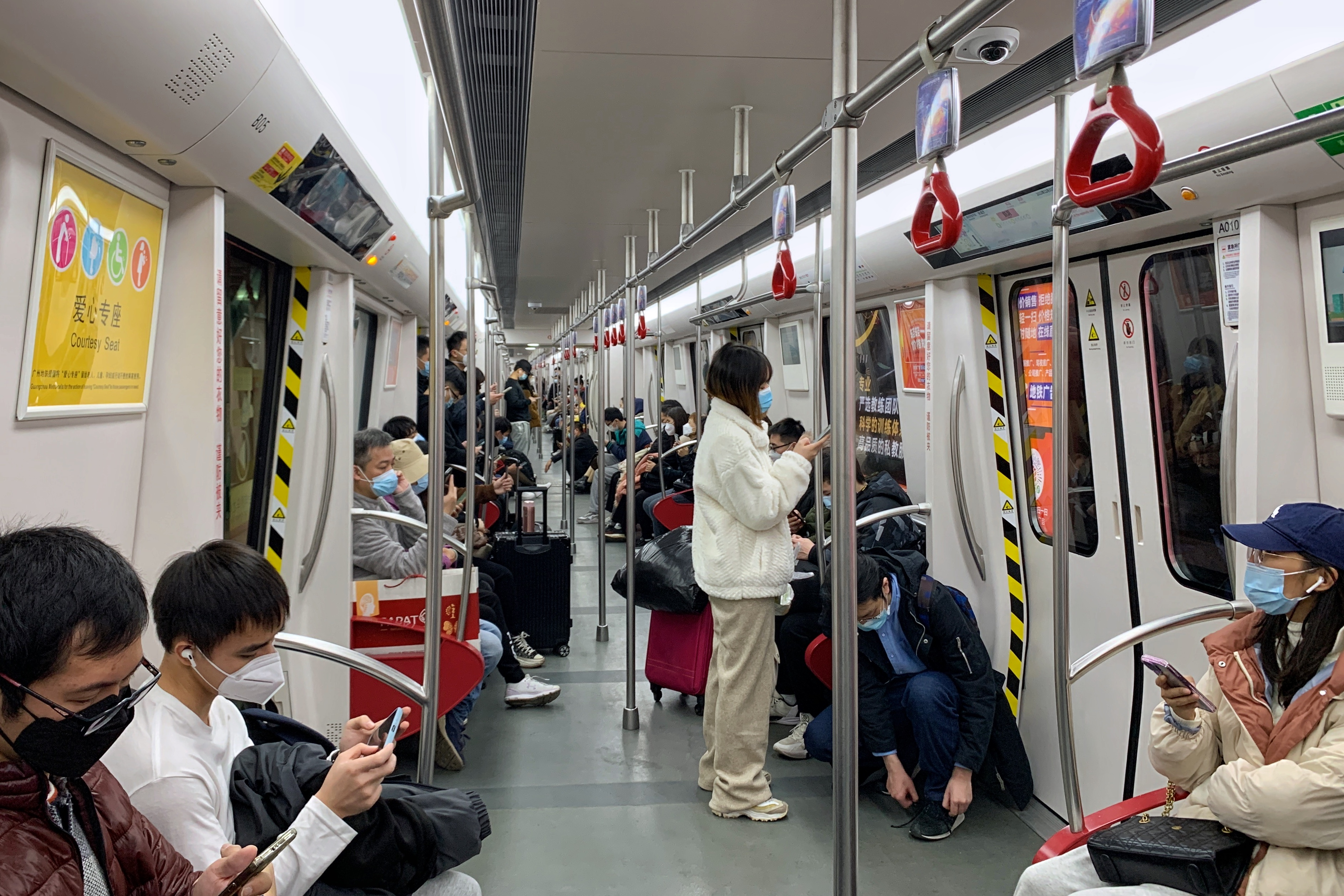
Interior of B3 train

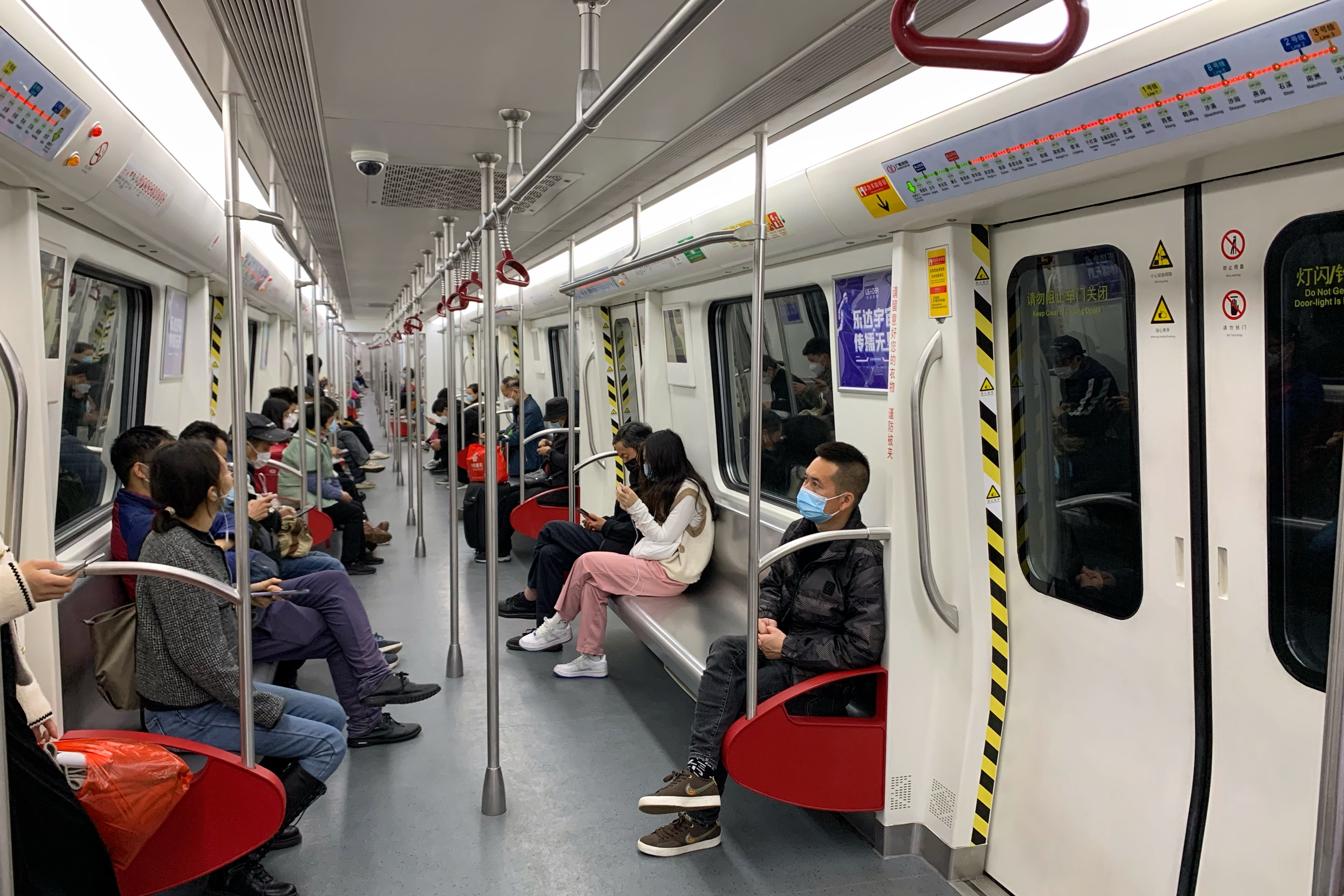
Interior of B3-I train

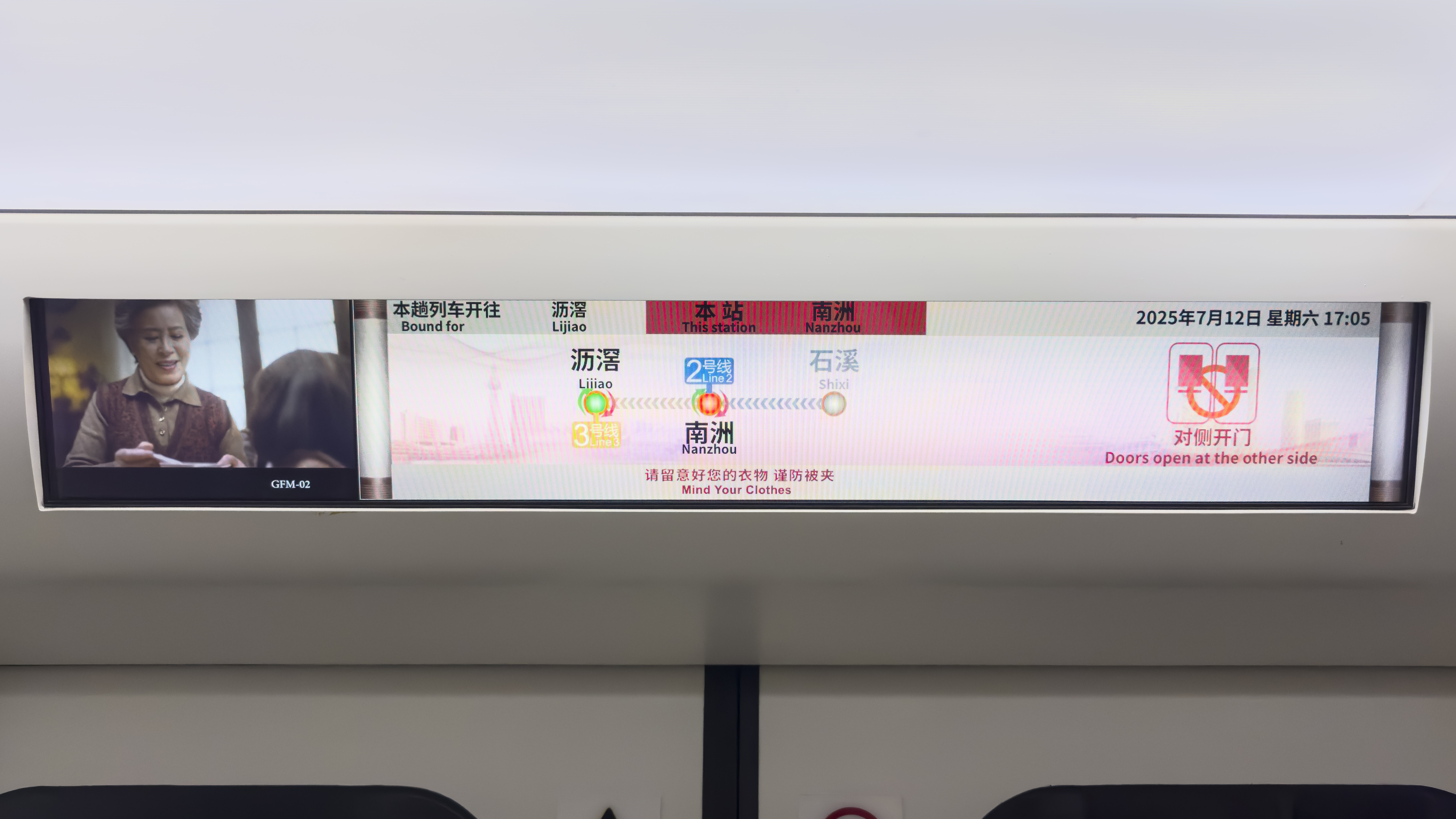
LCD Display of B3-II train

== Future Development ==
=== Guangzhou section ===
An eastern extension from Lijiao to Dashacundong is under planning. The extension will be 2.4 km (1.49 mi) in length.
