= Xincheng Dong station =

Guangfo Metro station in Foshan

Coordinates: 22°57′31″N 113°08′24″E

Xincheng Dong 新城东
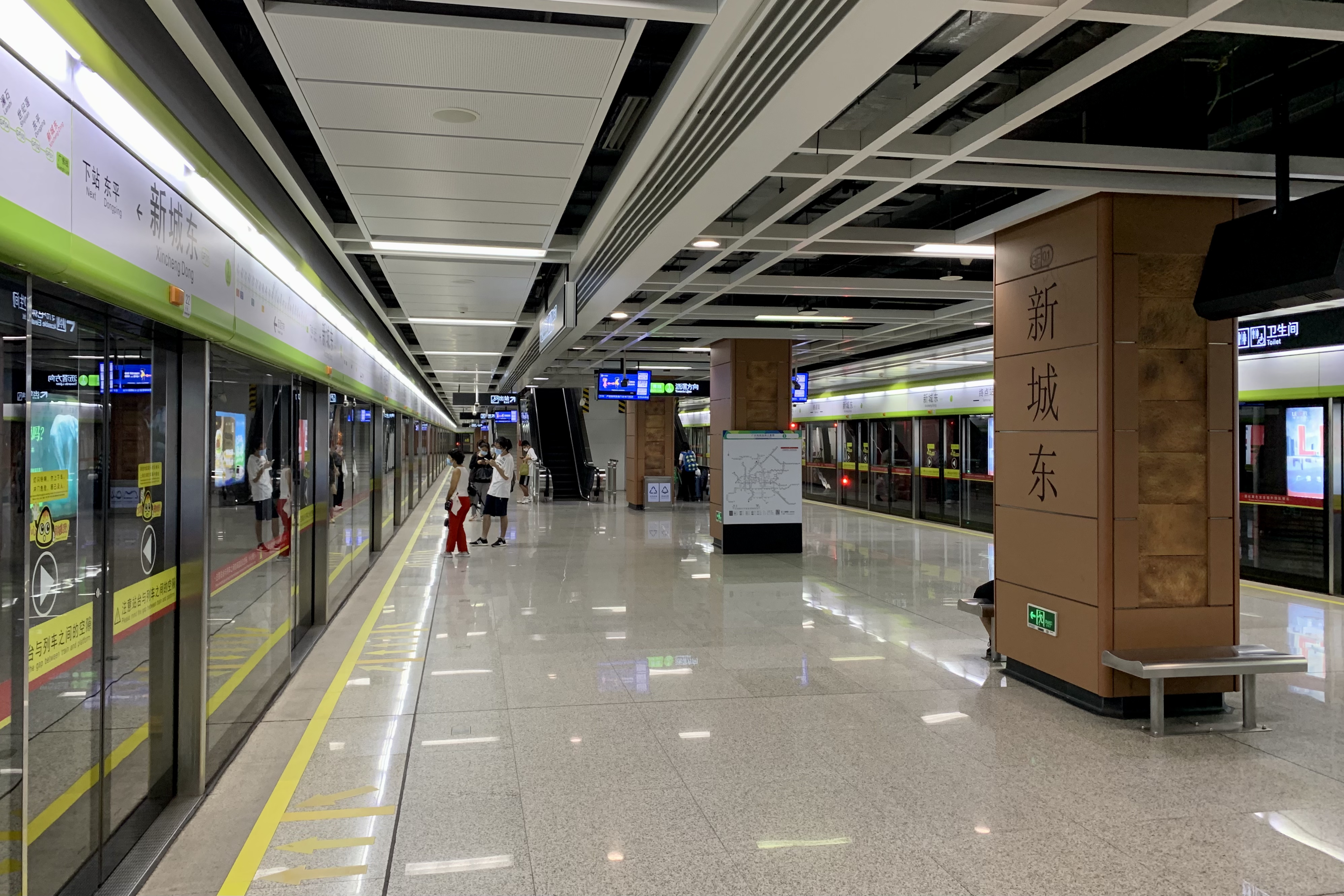

Chinese name
- Simplified Chinese: 新城东站
- Traditional Chinese: 新城東站
Transcriptions
Standard Mandarin
- Hanyu Pinyin: Xīnchéng Dōng Zhàn
Yue: Cantonese
- Jyutping: san^{1}sing^{4} dung^{1} zaam^{6}

General information
- Location: Yuhe Road (裕和路) east of Baishun Street (百顺道); Shunde District, Foshan, Guangdong; China
- Operated by: Guangzhou Metro Co. Ltd.
- Line: Guangfo line

Other information
- Station code: GF01

History
- Opened: 28 December 2016; 9 years ago

Services
Preceding station	Foshan Metro	Following station
Terminus	Guangfo Line	Dongping towards Lijiao
Location

Xincheng Dong station (Chinese: 新城东站; pinyin: Xīnchéng Dōng zhàn; lit. 'New Town East station') is a station and the southern terminus of the Guangfo line of the Foshan Metro and Guangzhou Metro, located in Foshan's Shunde District. It started operations on 28 December 2016.

== Station layout ==
G	-	Exits
L1; Concourse	Lobby	Customer Service, Vending machines
L2; Platforms	Platform 2	Guangfo termination platform
L2; Platforms	Island platform, doors will open on the left
L2; Platforms	Platform 1	Guangfo towards Lijiao (Dongping)

== Exits ==
Exit number	Exit location
Exit C	Yuhe Lu
Exit D	Yuhe Lu
