= Lijiao station =

Guangzhou Metro station

Lijiao 沥滘
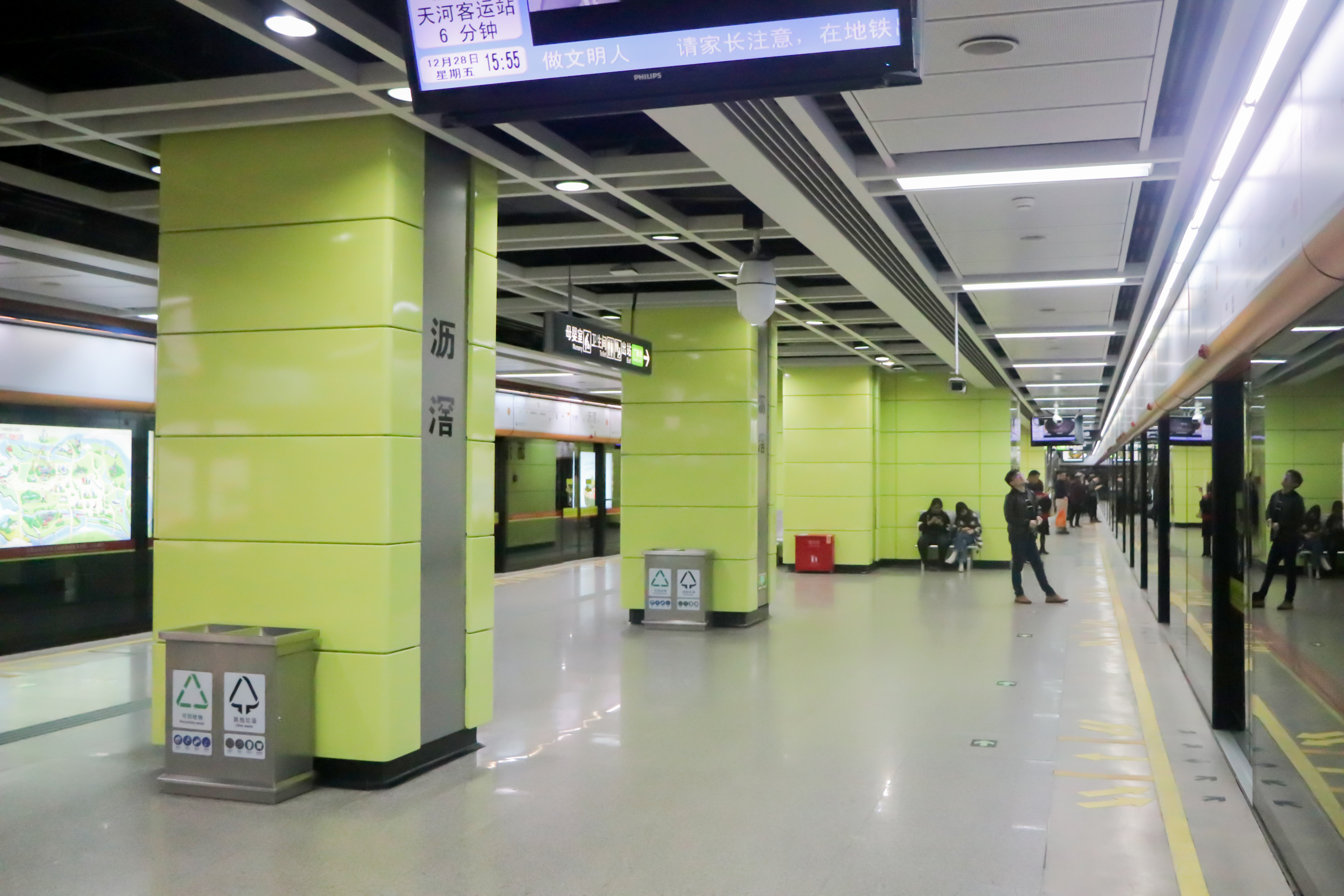
- Line 3 platform

Chinese name
- Simplified Chinese: 沥滘站
- Traditional Chinese: 瀝滘站
Transcriptions
Standard Mandarin
- Hanyu Pinyin: Lìjiào Zhàn
Yue: Cantonese
- Yale Romanization: Lehkgaau Jaahm
- Jyutping: lek^{1}gaau^{3} zaam^{6}
- Hong Kong Romanization: Lek Kau station

General information
- Location: Haizhu District, Guangzhou, Guangdong; China
- Coordinates: 23.0550°N 113.3200°E
- Operated by: Guangzhou Metro Co. Ltd.
- Lines: Line 3; Guangfo line
- Platforms: 4 (1 island platform and 2 side platforms)
- Tracks: 4

Construction
- Structure type: Underground
- Accessible: Yes

Other information
- Station code: 306 GF25

History
- Opened: 30 December 2006; 19 years ago (Line 3); 28 December 2018; 7 years ago (Guangfo line)

Services
Preceding station	Guangzhou Metro	Following station
Xiajiao towards Haibang	Line 3	Datang towards Airport North (Terminal 2) or Tianhe Coach Terminal
Nanzhou towards Xincheng Dong	Guangfo line	Terminus
Location

Lijiao Station (simplified Chinese: 沥滘站; traditional Chinese: 瀝滘站; Cantonese Yale: Līkgaau Jaahm) is an interchange station between Line 3 and the Guangfo line of the Guangzhou Metro, and also the eastern terminus of the Guangfo line. It started operations on 28 December 2006. It is located under Lijiao Village (沥滘村) in the Haizhu District of Guangzhou. The Guangfo line was planned to open in 2010 but finally opened on 28 December 2018.

== Station layout ==
G	Street level	Exits A, B, E, F
L1; Concourse	South Lobby	Not in service
L1; Concourse	-	(Lijiao River)
L1; Concourse	North Lobby	Ticket Machines, Customer Service, Shops, Police Station, Safety Facilities, Baby Change
L2; Platforms	-	Line 3 equipment area
L2; Platforms	Side platform, doors will open on the right
L2; Platforms	Platform 4	Guangfo towards Xincheng Dong (Nanzhou)
L2; Platforms	Platform 3	Guangfo termination platform
L2; Platforms	Side platform, doors will open on the right
L3; Platforms	Platform 1	3 towards Haibang (Xiajiao)
L3; Platforms	Island platform, doors will open on the left
L3; Platforms	Platform 2	3 towards Tianhe Coach Terminal or Airport North (Datang)

== Exits ==
Exit number	Exit location
Exit A	Lijiaocun
Exit B	Lijiaocun
Exit E	Lijiaocun
Exit F	Lijiaocun

== Gallery ==
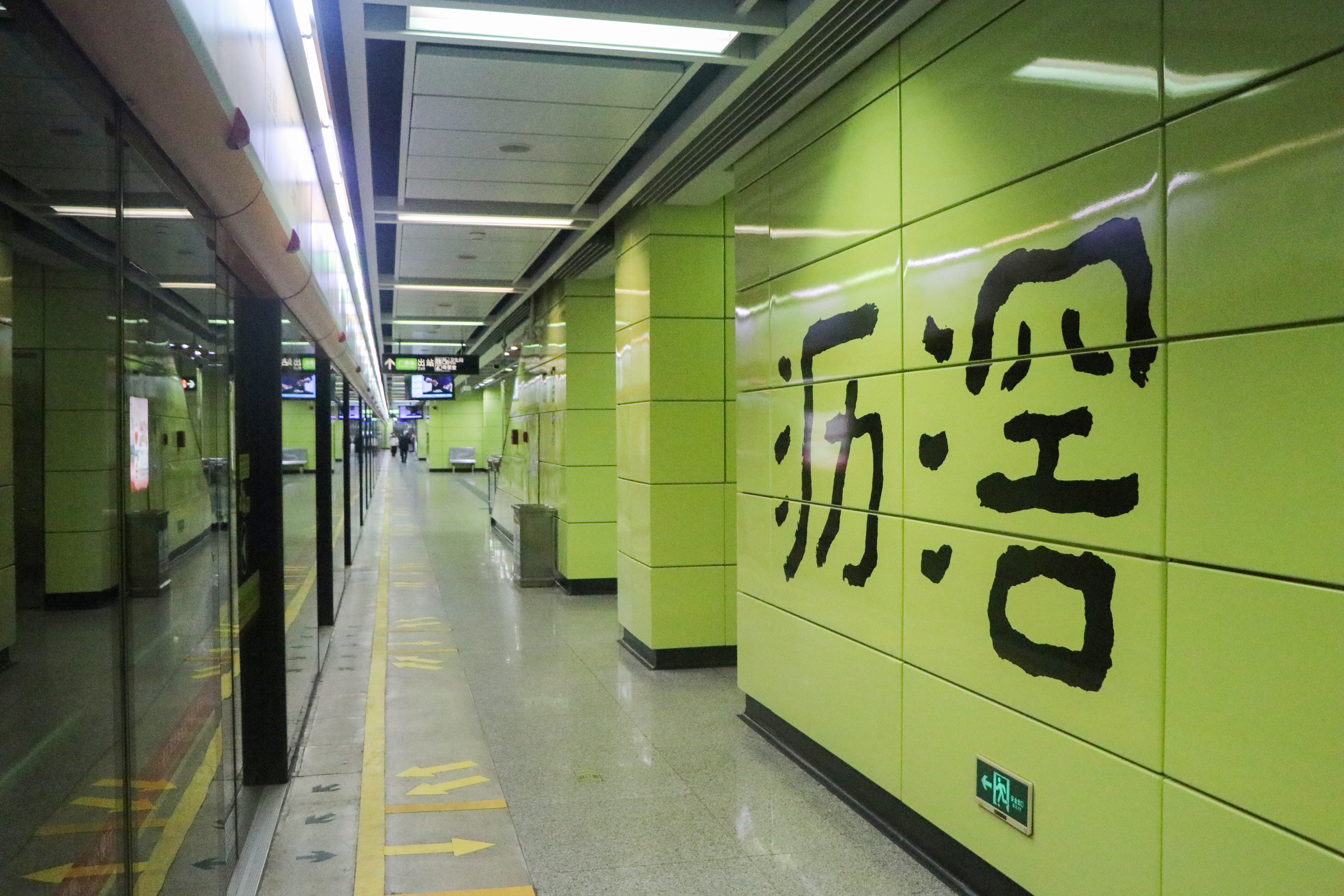
Line 3 southbound platform facing north

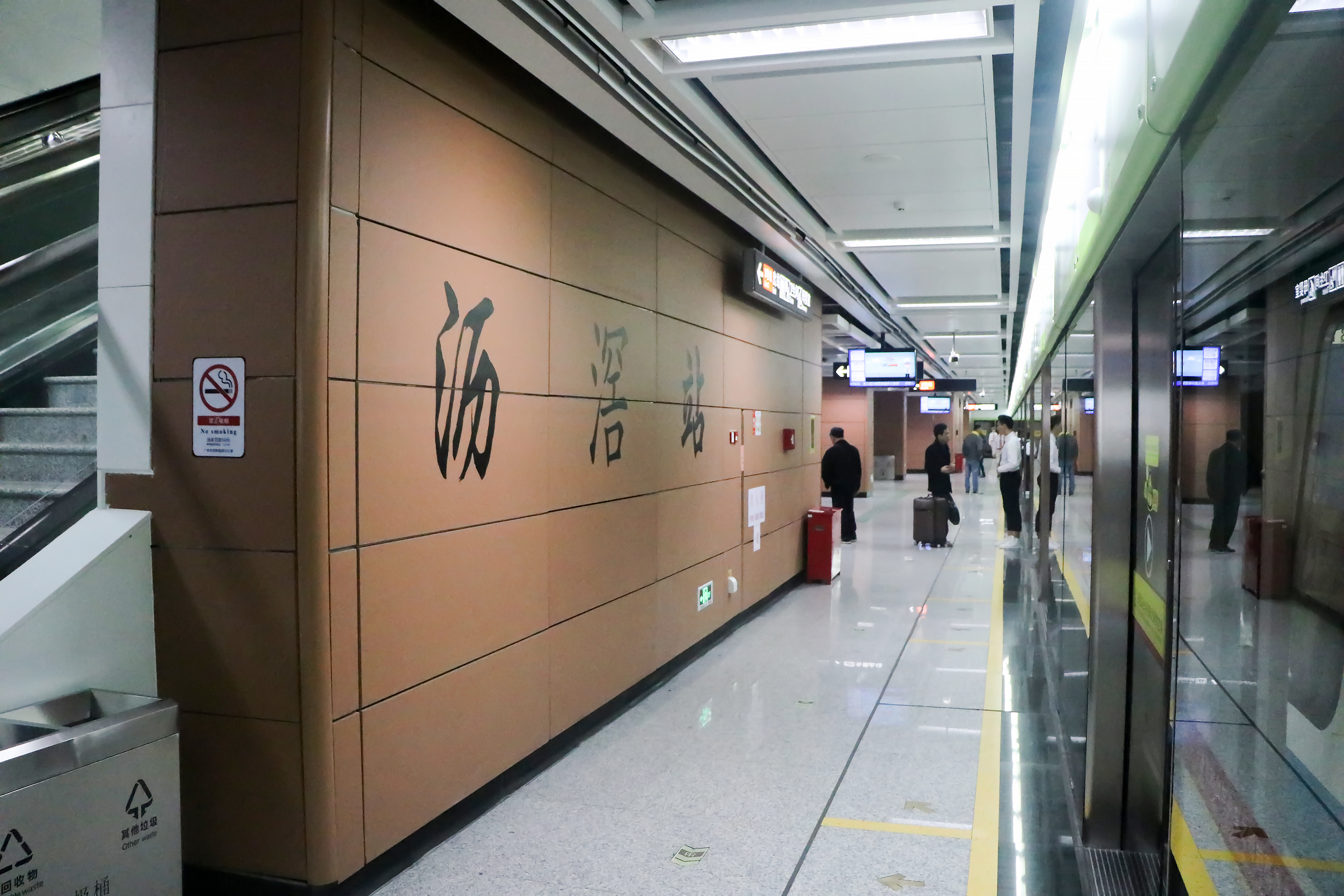
Guangfo line termination platform

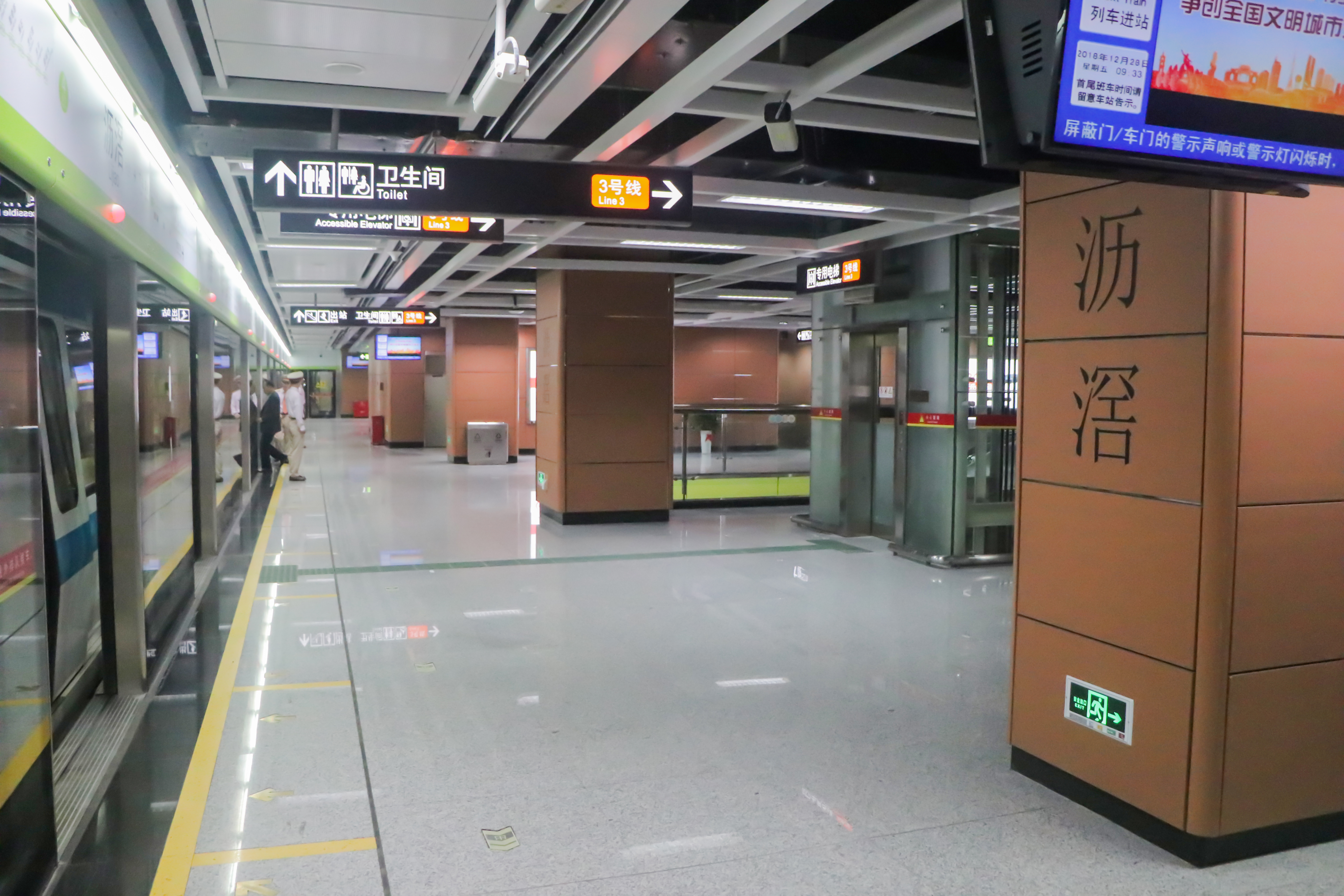
Guangfo line originating platform

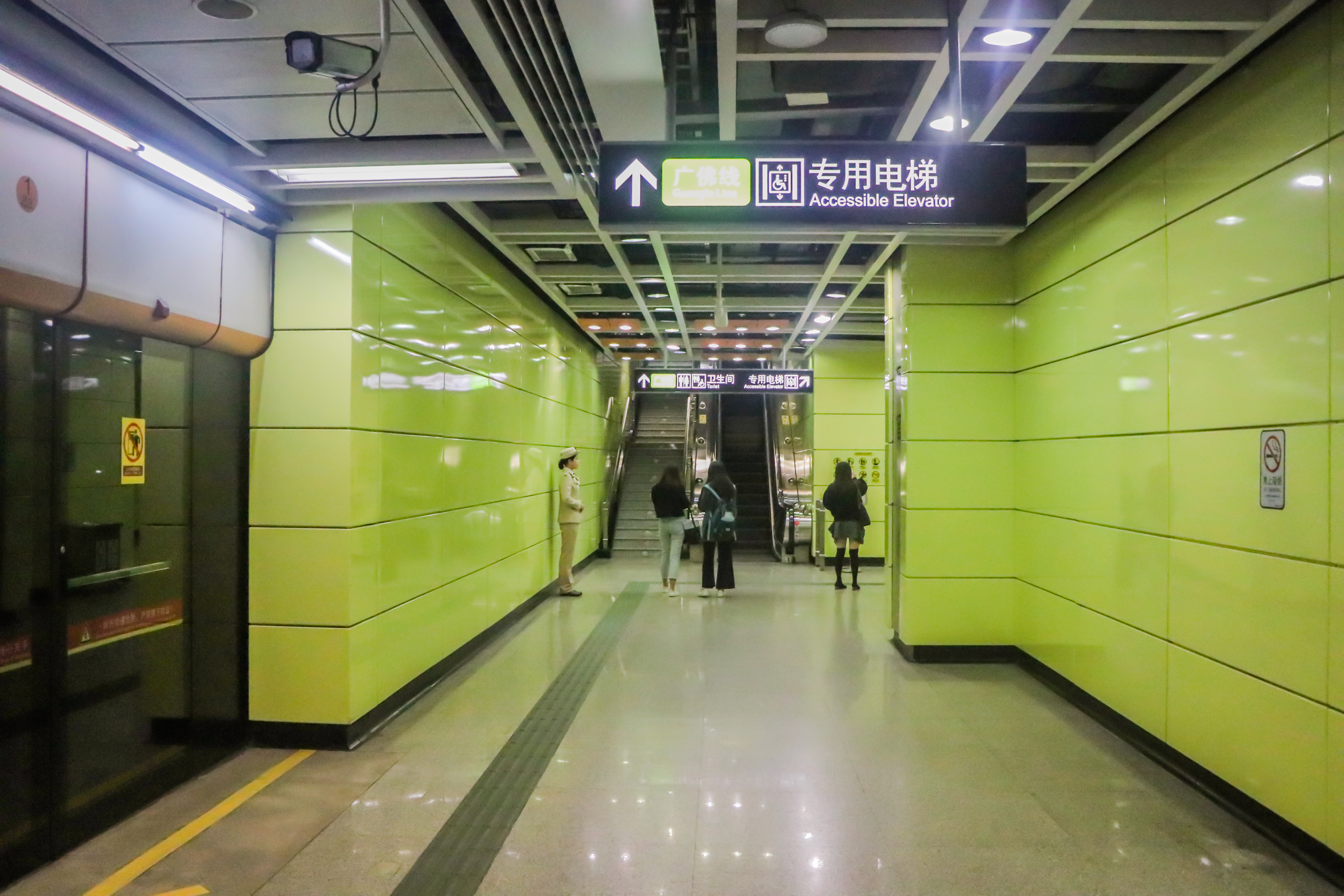
North end of Line 3 platform with escalators and stairs to platform 4 (Guangfo line originating platform)

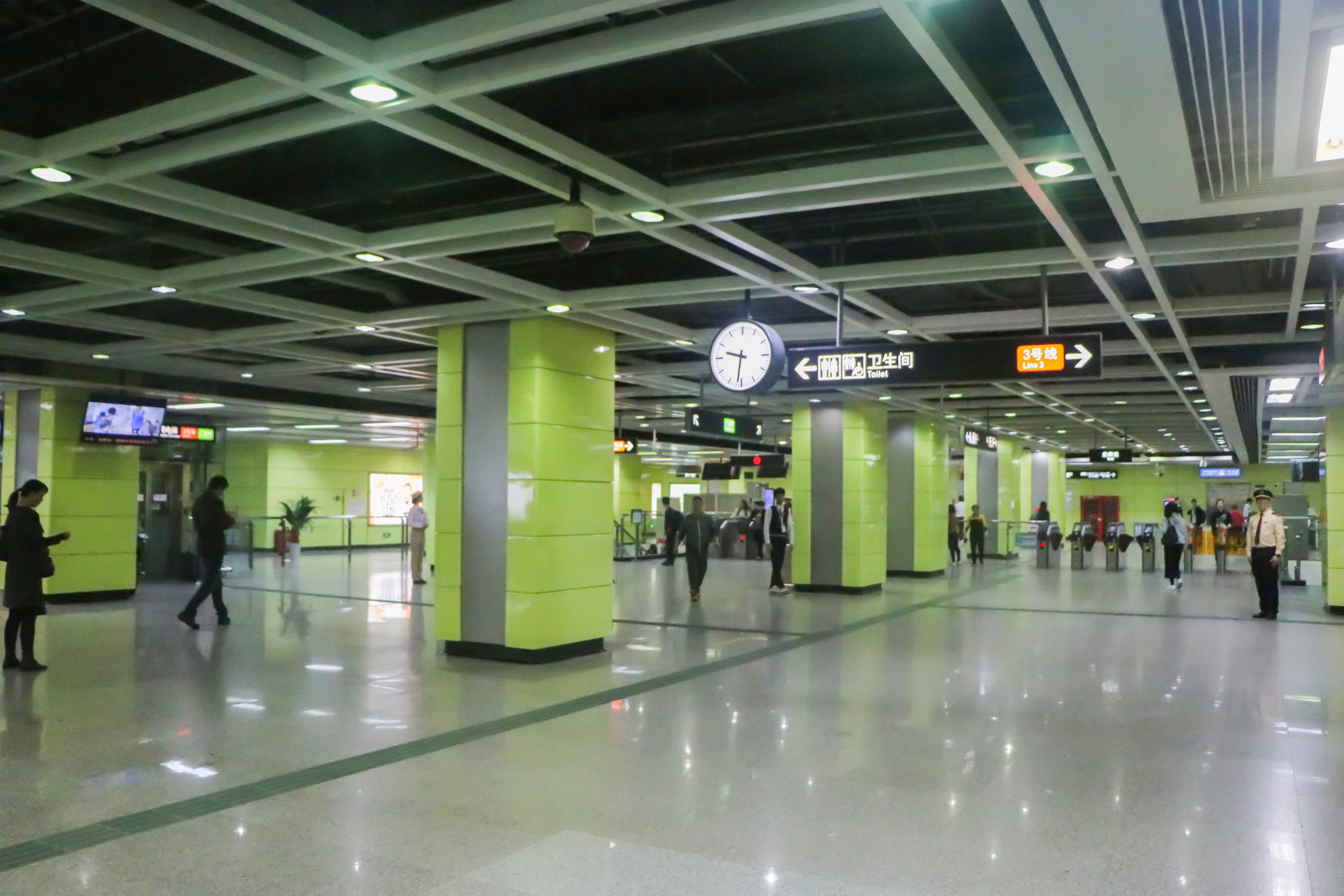
North concourse
