= Ultra Prime =

Ultra Prime may refer to:

- Ultra Prime Esports, Nenking's professional esports franchise based in China.
- Ultra-Prime, a Galactic Patrol fortress from the Lensman science fiction series.
