= Financial Hi-Tech Zone station =

Guangfo Metro station in Foshan

Coordinates: 23°03′57″N 113°09′31″E

Financial Hi-Tech Zone 金融高新区
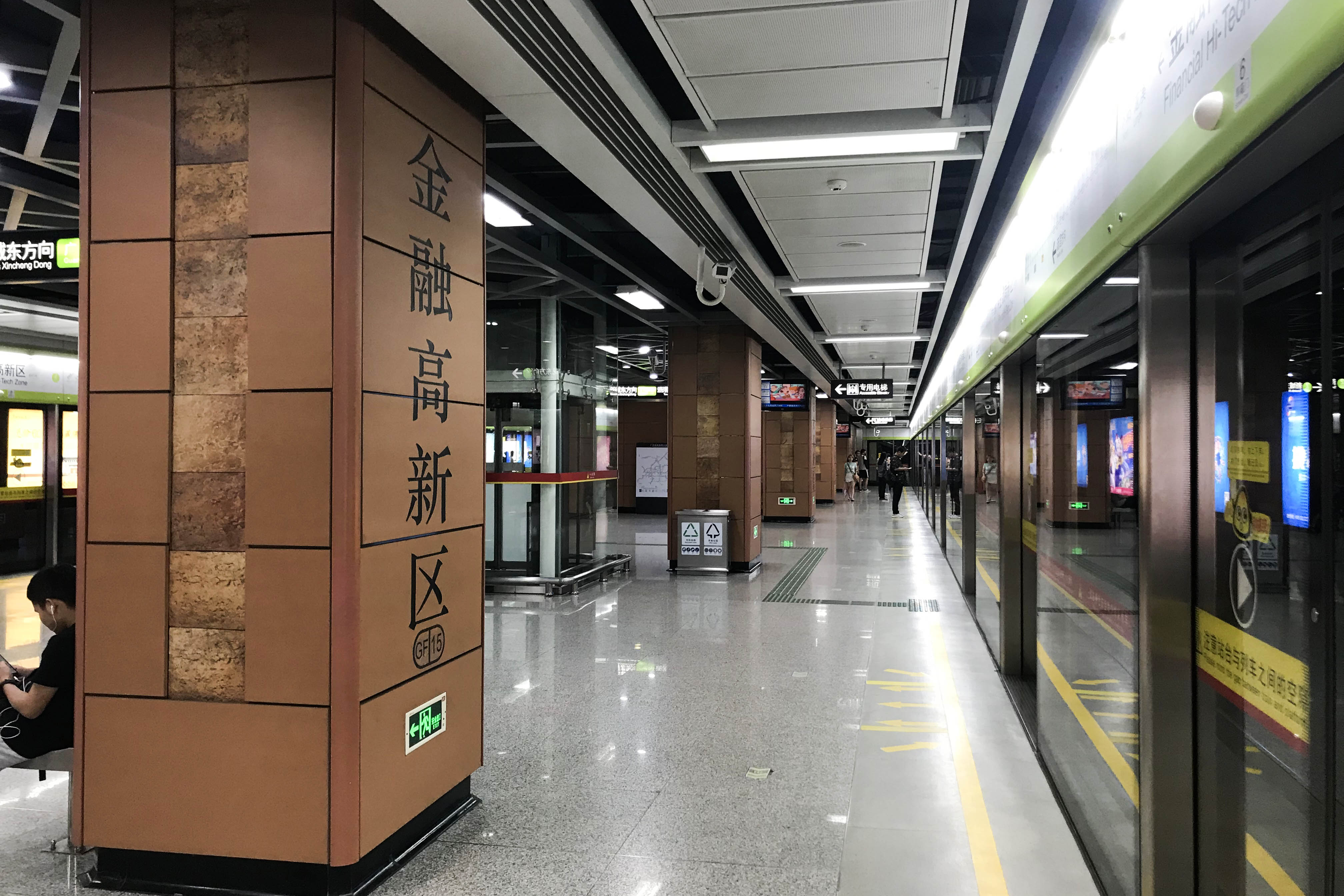

Chinese name
- Simplified Chinese: 金融高新区站
- Traditional Chinese: 金融高新區站
Transcriptions
Standard Mandarin
- Hanyu Pinyin: Jīnróng Gāoxīn Qū Zhàn
Yue: Cantonese
- Jyutping: gam^{1}jung^{4} gou^{1}san^{1} keoi^{1} zaam^{6}

General information
- Location: Nanhai District, Foshan, Guangdong; China
- Operated by: Foshan Railway Investment Construction Group Co. Ltd. Guangzhou Metro Co. Ltd.
- Line: Guangfo line
- Platforms: 2 (1 island platform)

Construction
- Structure type: Underground

Other information
- Station code: GF15

History
- Opened: 3 November 2010; 15 years ago

Services
Preceding station	Foshan Metro	Following station
Qiandeng Lake towards Xincheng Dong	Guangfo Line	Longxi towards Lijiao
Location

Financial Hi-Tech Zone Station (Chinese: 金融高新区站) is a metro station on Guangfo Line (FMetro Line 1) of the Guangzhou Metro. It is located under the Guangdong Financial High Tech Service Zone (广东金融高新技术服务区), in Haiba Road (海八路) in the Guicheng Subdistrict of the Nanhai District, Foshan. It was completed on 3 November 2010. This is the last station on the Guangfo line eastbound before it enters Guangzhou's Liwan District.

== Station layout ==
G	-	Exits
L1; Concourse	Lobby	Customer Service, Vending machines, ATMs
L2; Platforms	Platform 2	Guangfo towards Xincheng Dong (Qiandeng Lake)
L2; Platforms	Island platform, doors will open on the left
L2; Platforms	Platform 1	Guangfo towards Lijiao (Longxi)

== Exits ==
Exit number	Exit location
Exit A	Haiba Lu
Exit B	Haiba Lu
