= Vice President Xiao =

Vice President Xiao may refer to:

- Sonny Xiao, vice-president of Nenking Group
- Hsiao Bi-khim (蕭美琴; pinyin: Xiāo Měiqín; born 1971), 16th Vice President of the Republic of China
- Vincent Siew (蕭萬長; pinyin: Xiāo Wàncháng; born 1939), 12th Vice President of the Republic of China

== See also ==
- Xiao (surname)
