= List of Guangzhou Charge players =

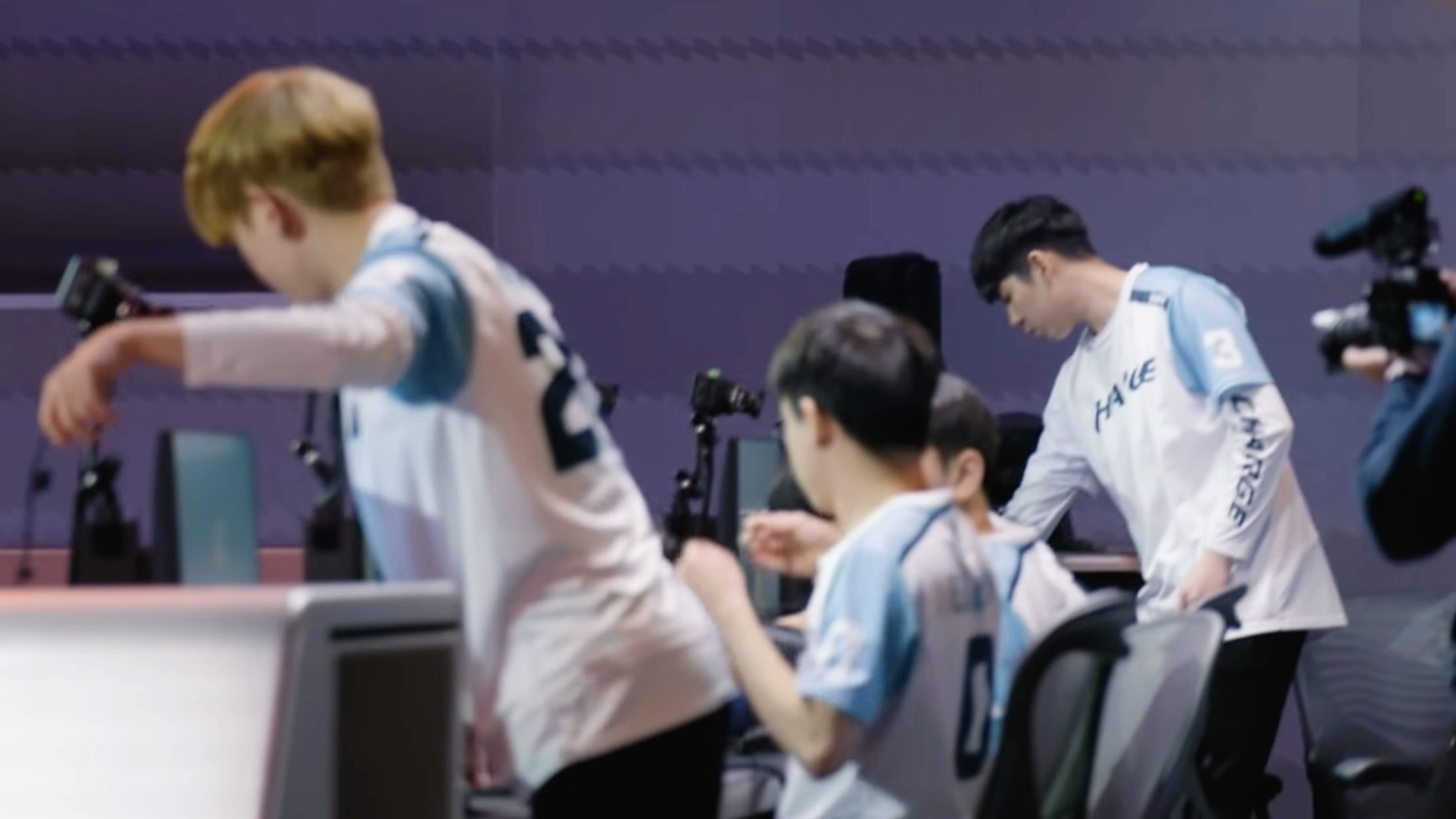
Guangzhou Charge players setting up prior to their match against Dallas Fuel in 2019.

Guangzhou Charge is a Chinese esports team founded in 2018 that competes in the Overwatch League (OWL). The Charge began playing competitive Overwatch in the 2019 season.

All rostered players during the OWL season (including the playoffs) are included, even if they did not make an appearance.

== All-time roster ==
As of December 15, 2021

Handle	Name	Role	Country	Seasons	Ref.
Bischu	Hyungseok Kim	Tank	South Korea	2019	
Chara	Jungyeon Kim	Support	South Korea	2019–2020	
ChoiSehwan	Sehwan Choi	Damage	South Korea	2021–present	
Cr0ng	Kicheol Nam	Tank	South Korea	2020–present	
Develop	Rakhoon Chae	Damage	South Korea	2022–present	
Eileen	Yiliang Ou	Damage	China	2019–present	
fragi	Joona Laine	Tank	Finland	2019	
Happy	Jungwoo Lee	Damage	South Korea	2019–2020	
HOTBA	Hongjun Choi	Tank	South Korea	2019	
Jihun	Jihun Kim	Tank	South Korea	2021	
KariV	Youngseo Bak	Support	South Korea	2021	
Krystal	Shilong Cai	Damage	China	2020	
Kyb	Finley Adisi	Damage	United Kingdom	2019	
Mandu	Chanhee Kim	Support	South Korea	2021	
MYKaylee	Zijie Zou	Damage	China	2021	
nero	Charlie Zwarg	Damage	United States	2019–2020	
neptuNo	Alberto González	Support	Spain	2020	
OnlyWish	Lizhen Chen	Support	China	2019	
Rio	Seungpyo Oh	Tank	South Korea	2019–present	
Rise	Wonjae Lee	Support	South Korea	2019	
Shu	Jinseo Kim	Support	South Korea	2019–2020	
Unique	Donghyun Yoo	Support	South Korea	2022–present	
Wya	Qi Haomiao	Support	China	2020	
