= Qiandeng Lake station =

Guangfo Metro station in Foshan

Coordinates: 23°03′17″N 113°09′19″E

Qiandeng Lake 千灯湖
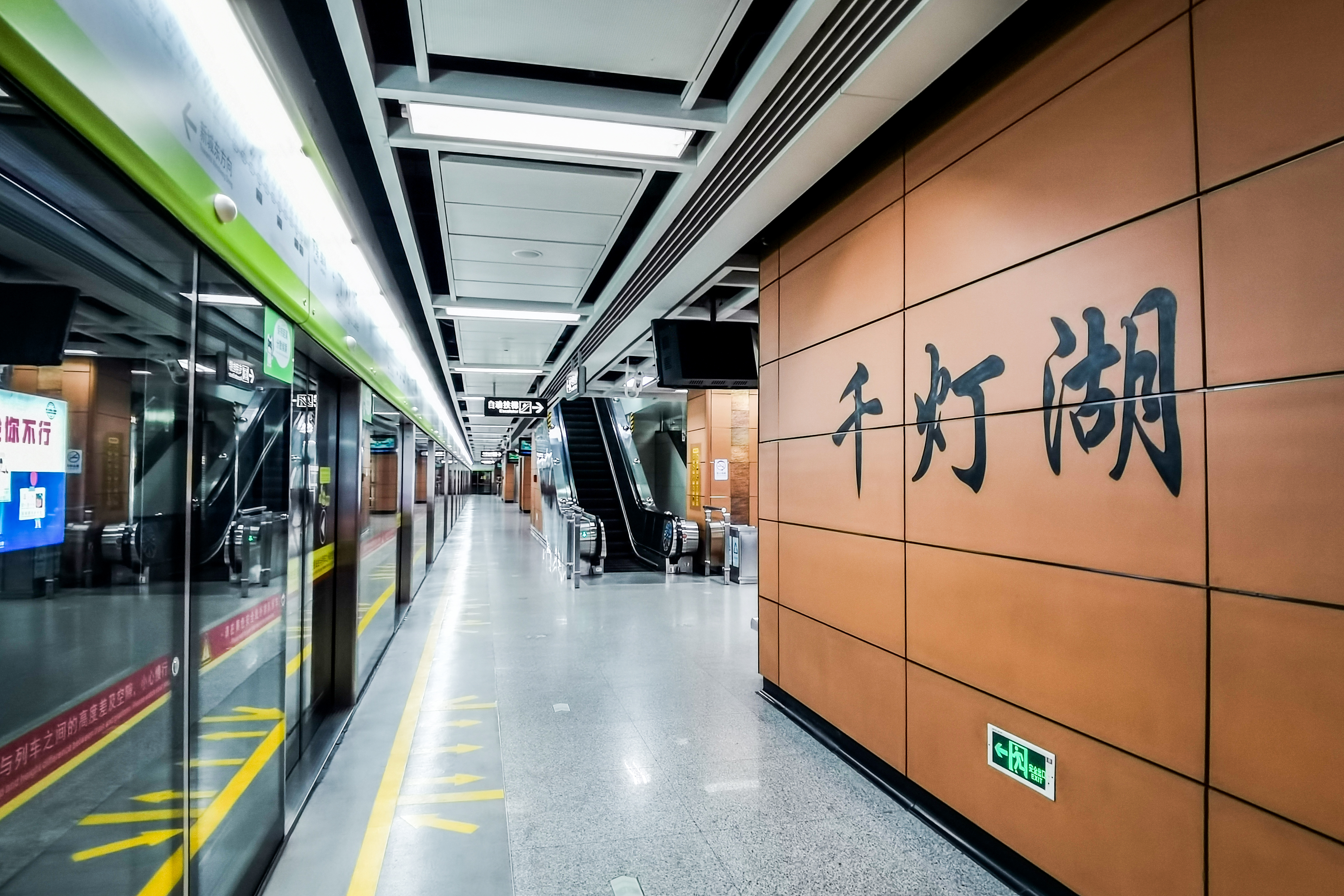

Chinese name
- Simplified Chinese: 千灯湖站
- Traditional Chinese: 千燈湖站
- Literal meaning: Thousand Lantern Lake
Transcriptions
Standard Mandarin
- Hanyu Pinyin: Qiāndēnghú Zhàn
Yue: Cantonese
- Jyutping: cin^{1}dang^{1}wu^{4} zaam^{6}

General information
- Location: Nanhai District, Foshan, Guangdong; China
- Operated by: Foshan Railway Investment Construction Group Co. Ltd. Guangzhou Metro Co. Ltd.
- Line: Guangfo Line
- Platforms: 2 (1 island platform)

Construction
- Structure type: Underground

Other information
- Station code: GF14

History
- Opened: 3 November 2010; 15 years ago

Services
Preceding station	Foshan Metro	Following station
Leigang towards Xincheng Dong	Guangfo Line	Financial Hi-Tech Zone towards Lijiao
Location

Qiandeng Lake station (Chinese: 千灯湖站; pinyin: Qiāndēnghú zhàn), known as Qiandenghu Lake station from 2010 to 2021, formerly Haiwu Lu station (海五路站) during planning, is a metro station on the Guangfo Line (FMetro Line 1). It is located under the junction of Guilan Road (桂澜路) and Haiwu Road (海五路), near Qiandeng Lake Park (千灯湖公园), in Guicheng Subdistrict, Nanhai District, Foshan. It was completed on 3 November 2010.

== Station layout ==
G	-	Exits
L1; Concourse	Lobby	Customer Service, Shops, Vending machines, ATMs
L2; Platforms	Platform 2	Guangfo towards Xincheng Dong (Leigang)
L2; Platforms	Island platform, doors will open on the left
L2; Platforms	Platform 1	Guangfo towards Lijiao (Financial Hi-Tech Zone)

== Exits ==
Exit number	Exit location
Exit A	Haiwu Lu
Exit B	Haiwu Lu
Exit C	Guilan Beilu
Exit D	Guilan Beilu
