= Yuqijie station =

Nanhai Tram Line 1 (Foshan Metro) station

Yuqijie (Note: Before the remaining section of the line opened, some signage shows the station name as 'Yuqi Street') 玉器街
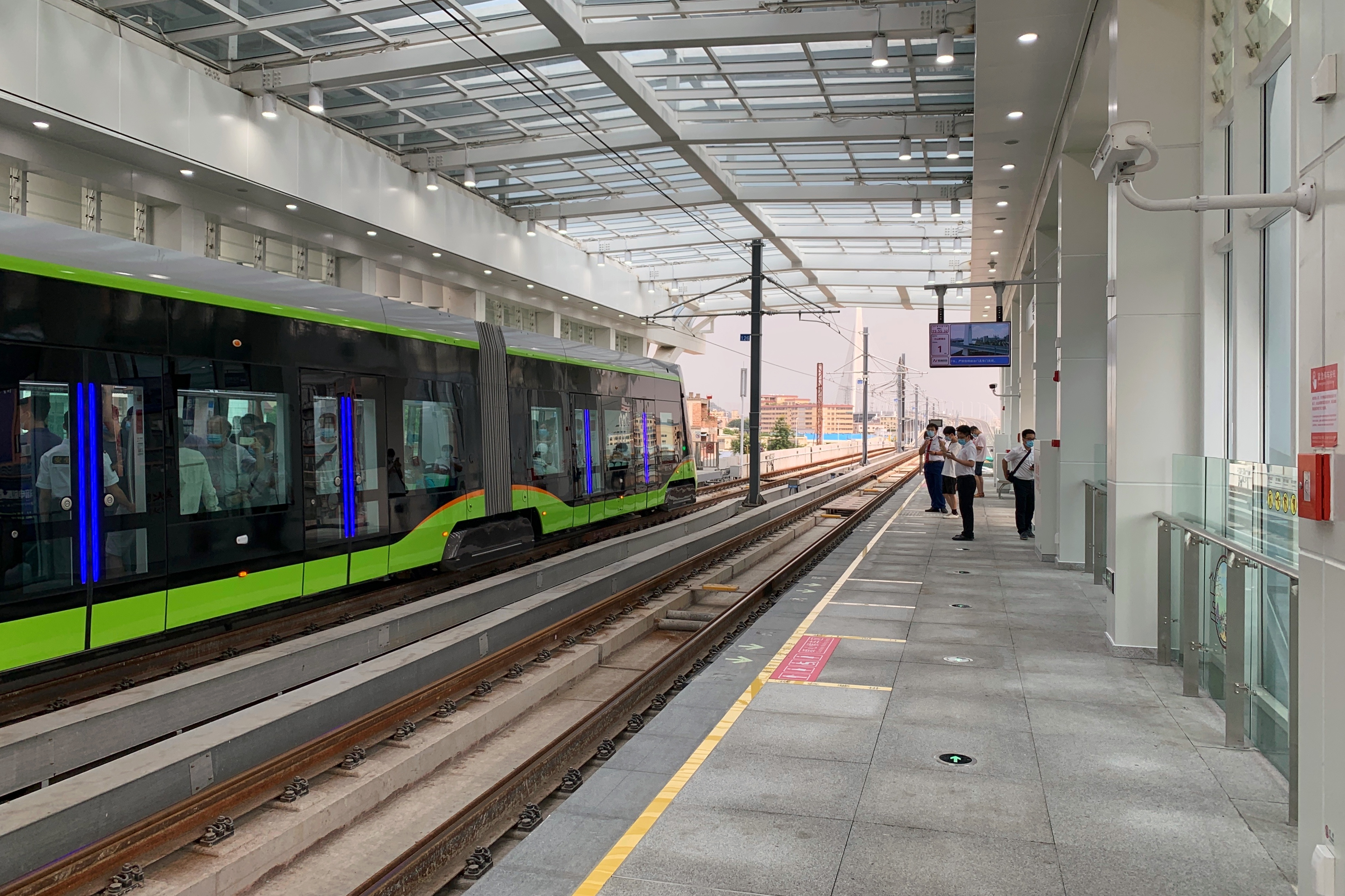
- Platform

Chinese name
- Chinese: 玉器街站
Transcriptions
Standard Mandarin
- Hanyu Pinyin: Yùqì Jiē Zhàn
Yue: Cantonese
- Yale Romanization: Yuhkhei Gāai Jaahm
- Jyutping: Juk^{6}hei^{3} Gaai^{1} Zaam^{6}

General information
- Location: Southeast side of intersection of Pingdong Avenue (平东大道) and Yuqi Street (玉器街), Guicheng Subdistrict; Nanhai District, Foshan, Guangdong; China
- Coordinates: 23°1′27.80″N 113°12′15.88″E
- Operator: Foshan Metro Operation Co., Ltd.
- Line: Nanhai Tram Line 1
- Platforms: 2 (2 side platforms)
- Tracks: 2

Construction
- Structure type: Elevated
- Accessible: Yes

Other information
- Station code: TNH108

History
- Opened: 18 August 2021 (4 years ago)

Services
Preceding station	Foshan Metro	Following station
Pingnan towards Leigang	Nanhai Tram Line 1	Zhongqu towards Linyuedong
Location

Yuqijie station (Chinese: 玉器街站; pinyin: Yùqì Jiē Zhàn; Cantonese Yale: Yuhkhei Gāai Jaahm; lit. 'Jadeware Street station') is a light metro station on Nanhai Tram Line 1 of Foshan Metro, located in Foshan's Nanhai District. It opened on 18 August 2021.

== Station layout ==
The station has two side platforms above Pingdong Boulevard.

F2; Platforms	Side platform, doors will open on the right
F2; Platforms	Platform 1	TNH1 towards Leigang (Pingnan)
F2; Platforms	Platform 2	TNH1 towards Linyuedong (Zhongqu)
F2; Platforms	Side platform, doors will open on the right
G Concourse	Lobby	Ticket Machines, Customer Service, Police Station, Security Facilities, Exits A & B

=== Entrances/exits ===
The station has 2 points of entry/exit. Exit B is equipped with a ramp.

- A: Pingdong Avenue
- B: Pingdong Avenue
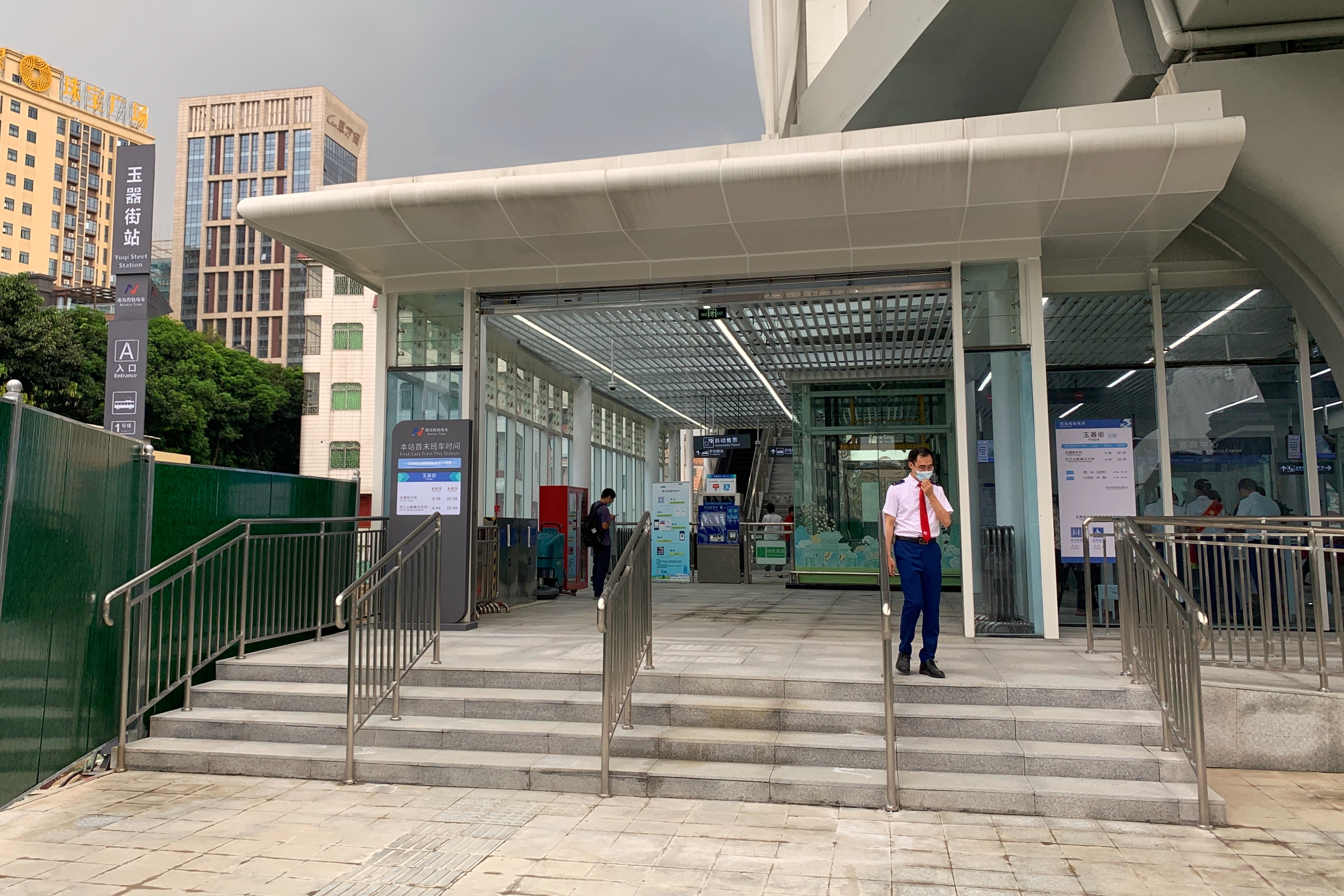
Entrance A

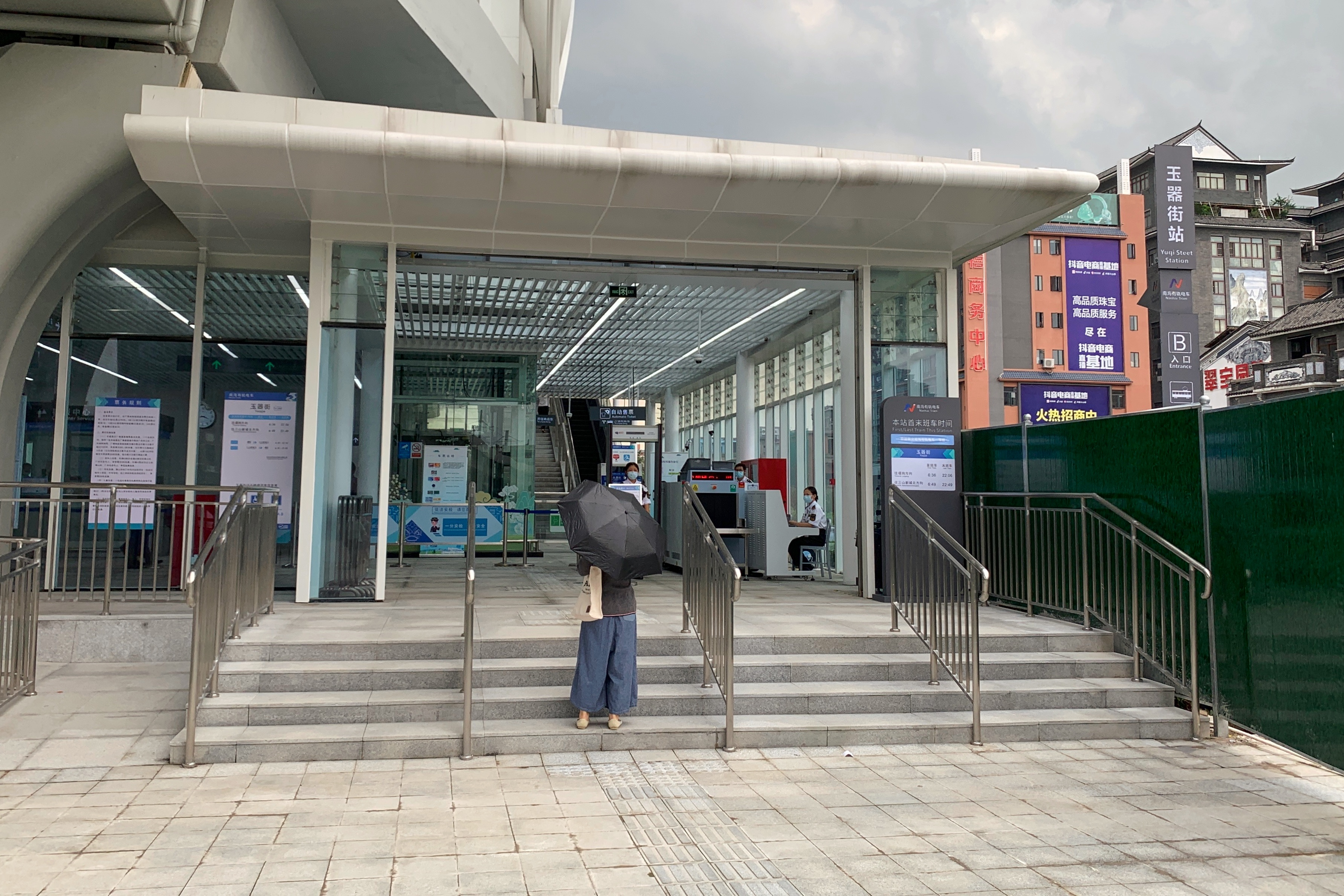
Entrance B
