= Pingnan station =

Nanhai Tram Line 1 (Foshan Metro) station

Pingnan 平南
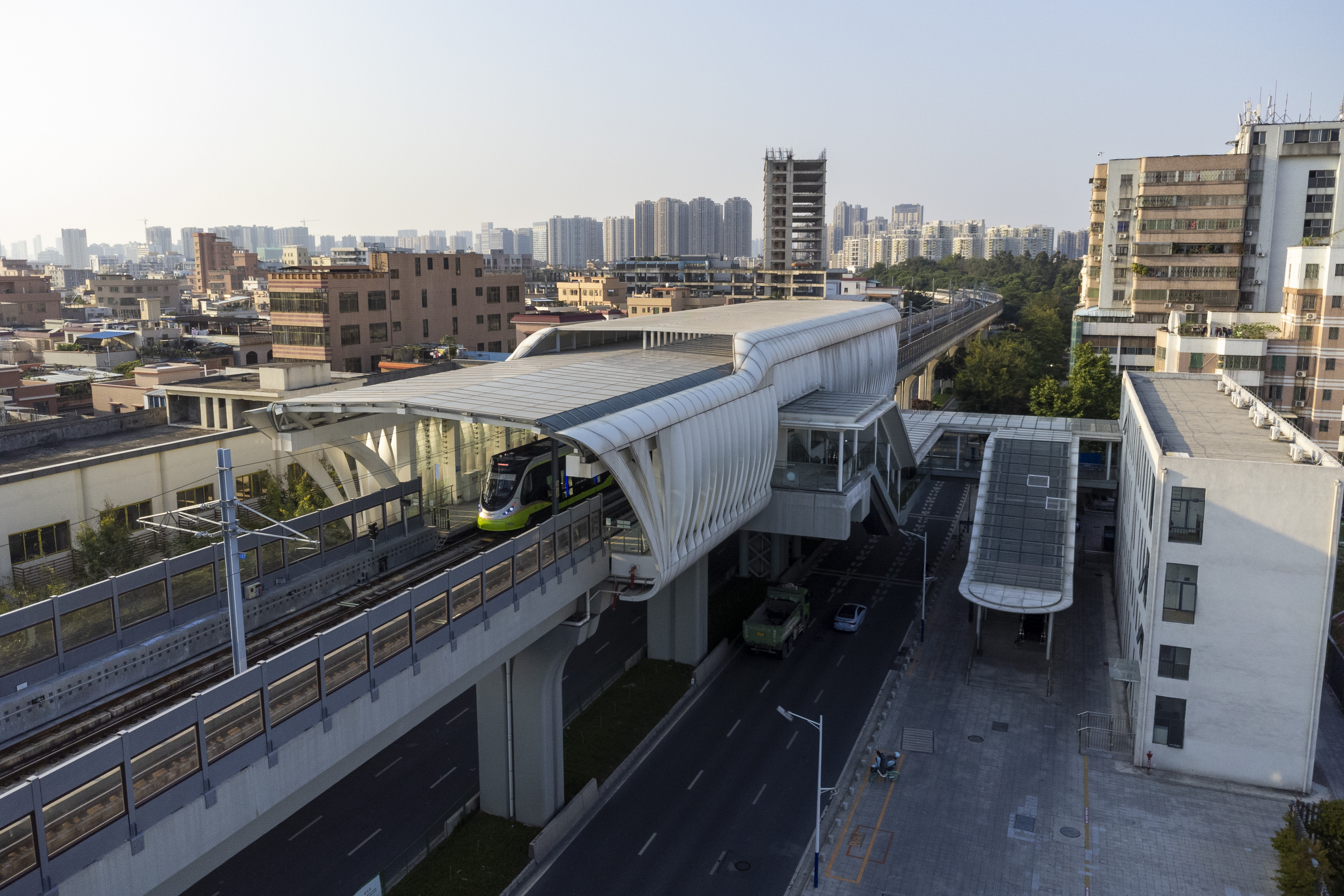
- Exterior

Chinese name
- Chinese: 平南站
Transcriptions
Standard Mandarin
- Hanyu Pinyin: Píng Nán Zhàn
Yue: Cantonese
- Yale Romanization: Pìngnàahm Jaahm
- Jyutping: Ping^{4}naam^{4} Zaam^{6}

General information
- Location: North of intersection of Baichen Highway (白陈公路) and Pingdong Avenue (平东大道), Guicheng Subdistrict; Nanhai District, Foshan, Guangdong; China
- Coordinates: 23°1′23.77″N 113°11′46.93″E
- Operator: Foshan Metro Operation Co., Ltd.
- Line: Nanhai Tram Line 1
- Platforms: 2 (2 side platforms)
- Tracks: 2

Construction
- Structure type: Elevated
- Accessible: Yes

Other information
- Station code: TNH107

History
- Opened: 18 August 2021 (4 years ago)
- Former names: Yong'an Road (永安路)

Services
Preceding station	Foshan Metro	Following station
Pingxi towards Leigang	Nanhai Tram Line 1	Yuqijie towards Linyuedong
Location

Pingnan station (Chinese: 平南站; pinyin: Píng Nán Zhàn; Cantonese Yale: Pìngnàahm Jaahm) is a light metro station on Nanhai Tram Line 1 of Foshan Metro, located in Foshan's Nanhai District. It opened on 18 August 2021.

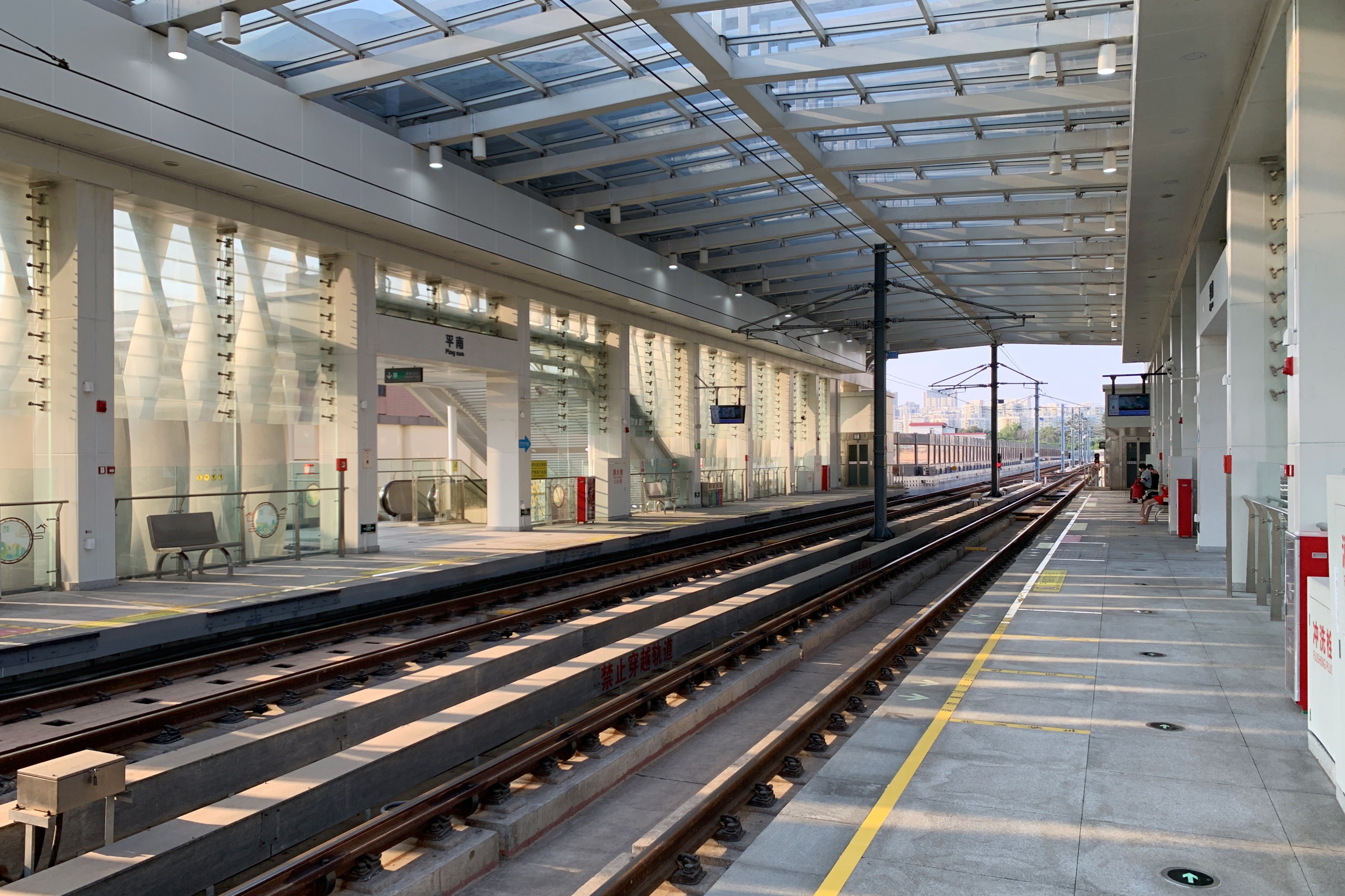
Platform

== Station layout ==
The station has two side platforms above Baichen Road.

F3; Platforms	Side platform, doors will open on the right
F3; Platforms	Platform 1	TNH1 towards Leigang (Pingxi)
F3; Platforms	Platform 2	TNH1 towards Linyuedong (Yuqijie)
F3; Platforms	Side platform, doors will open on the right
F2; Concourse	Lobby	Ticket Machines, Customer Service, Police Station, Security Facilities
G	-	Exits A-E

=== Entrances/exits ===
The station has 5 points of entry/exit. Exits B and E are equipped with elevators.

- A: Yong'an Road
- B: Yong'an Road
- C: Yong'an Road
- D: Yong'an Road
- E: Yong'an Road
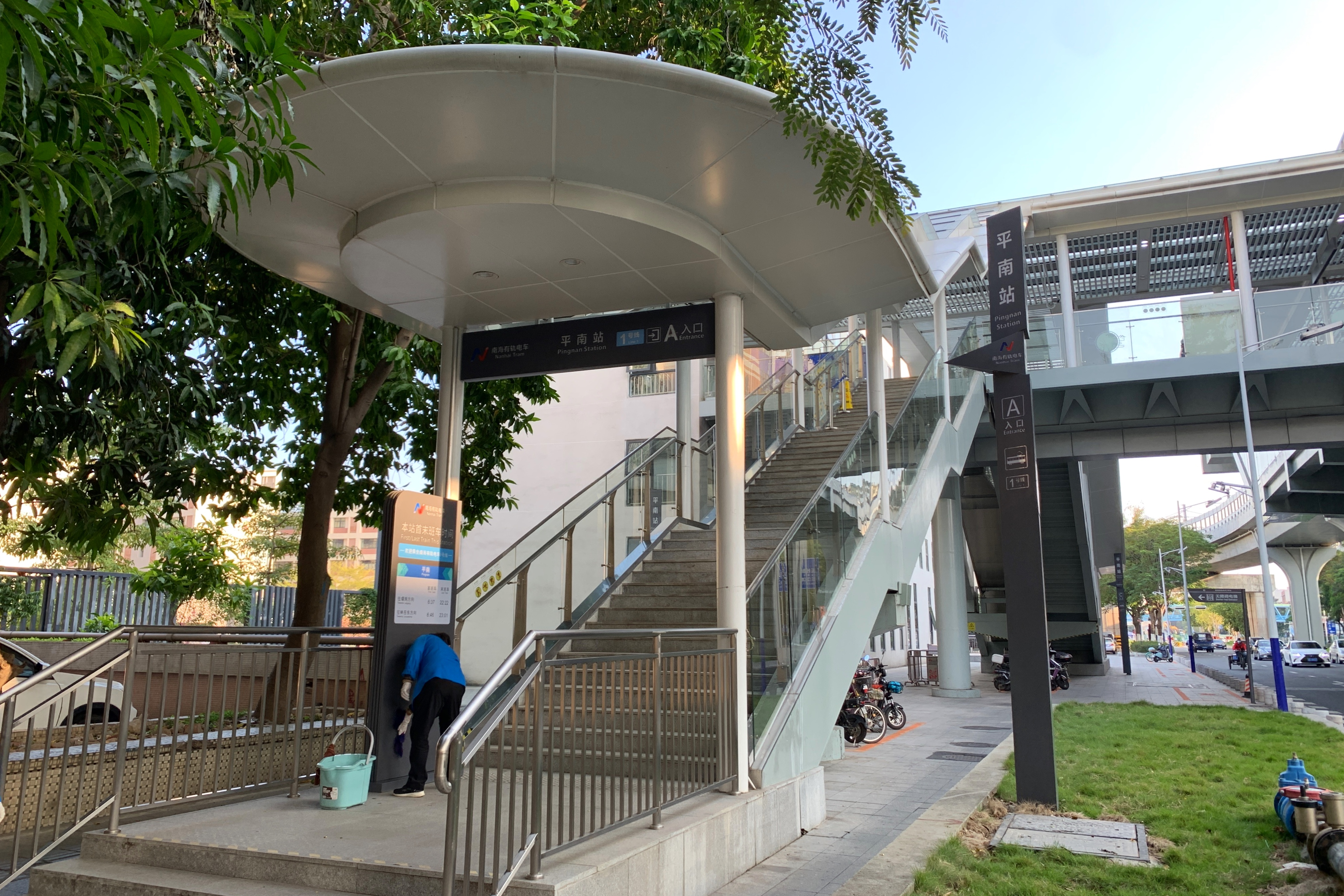
Entrance A

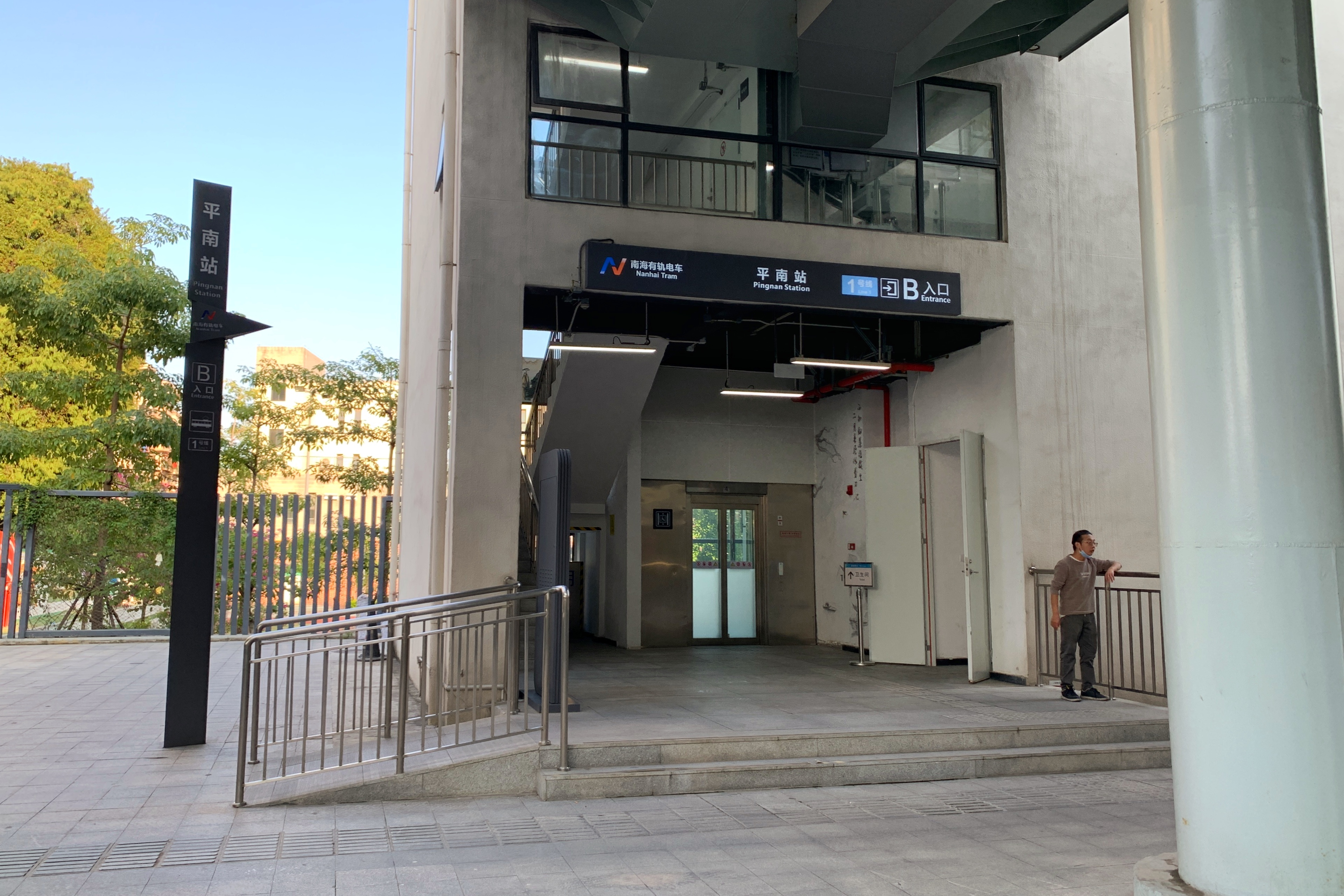
Entrance B

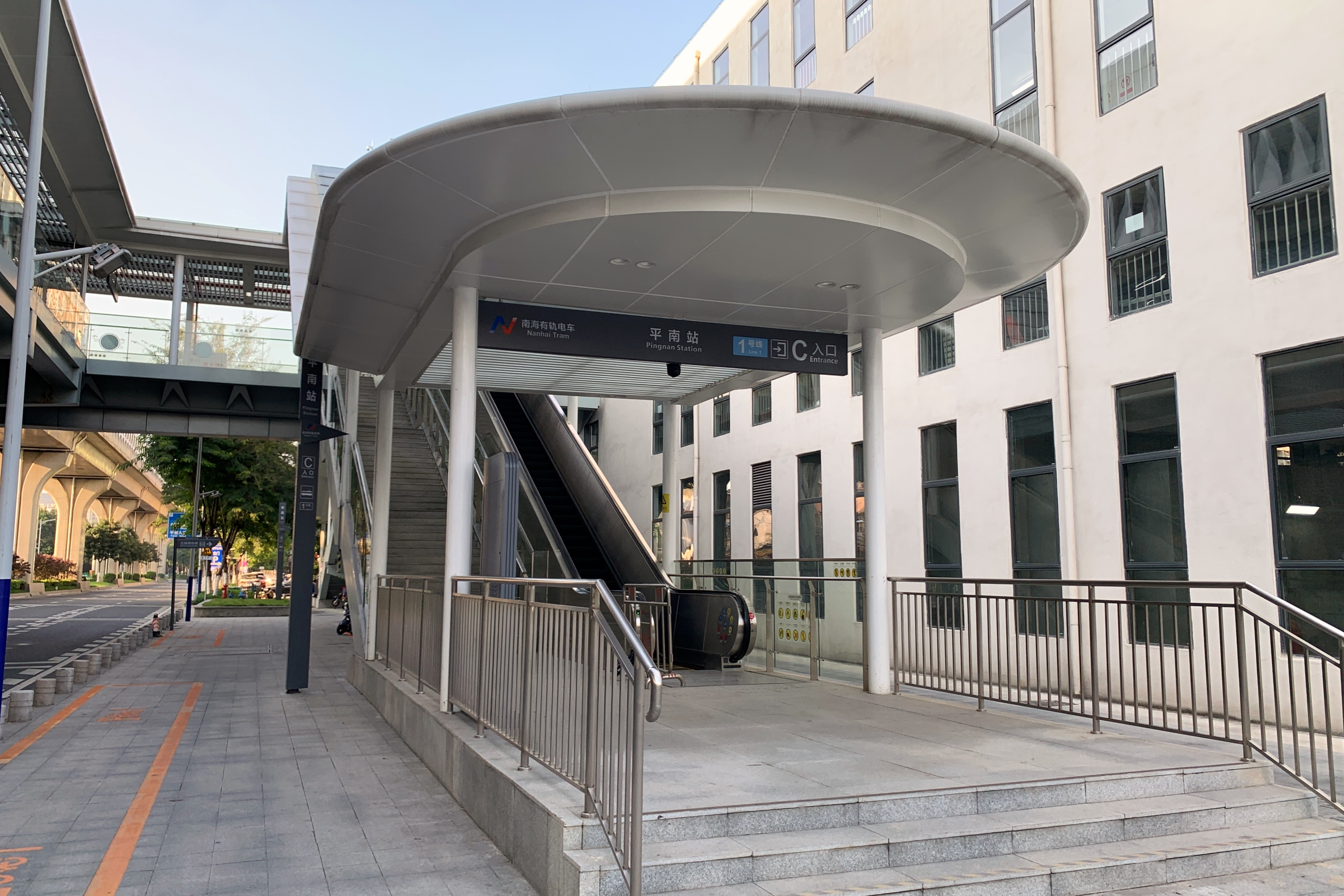
Entrance C

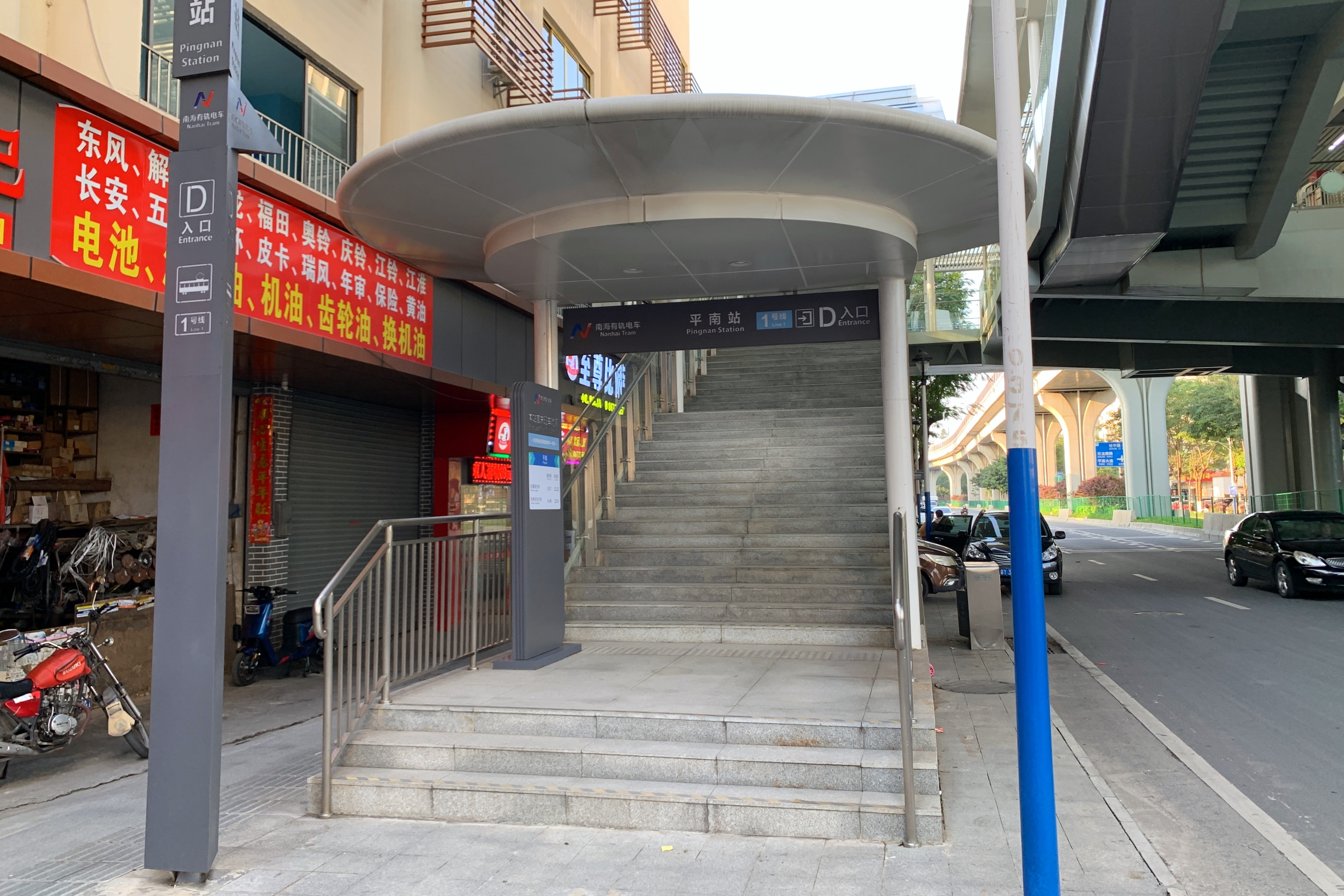
Entrance D

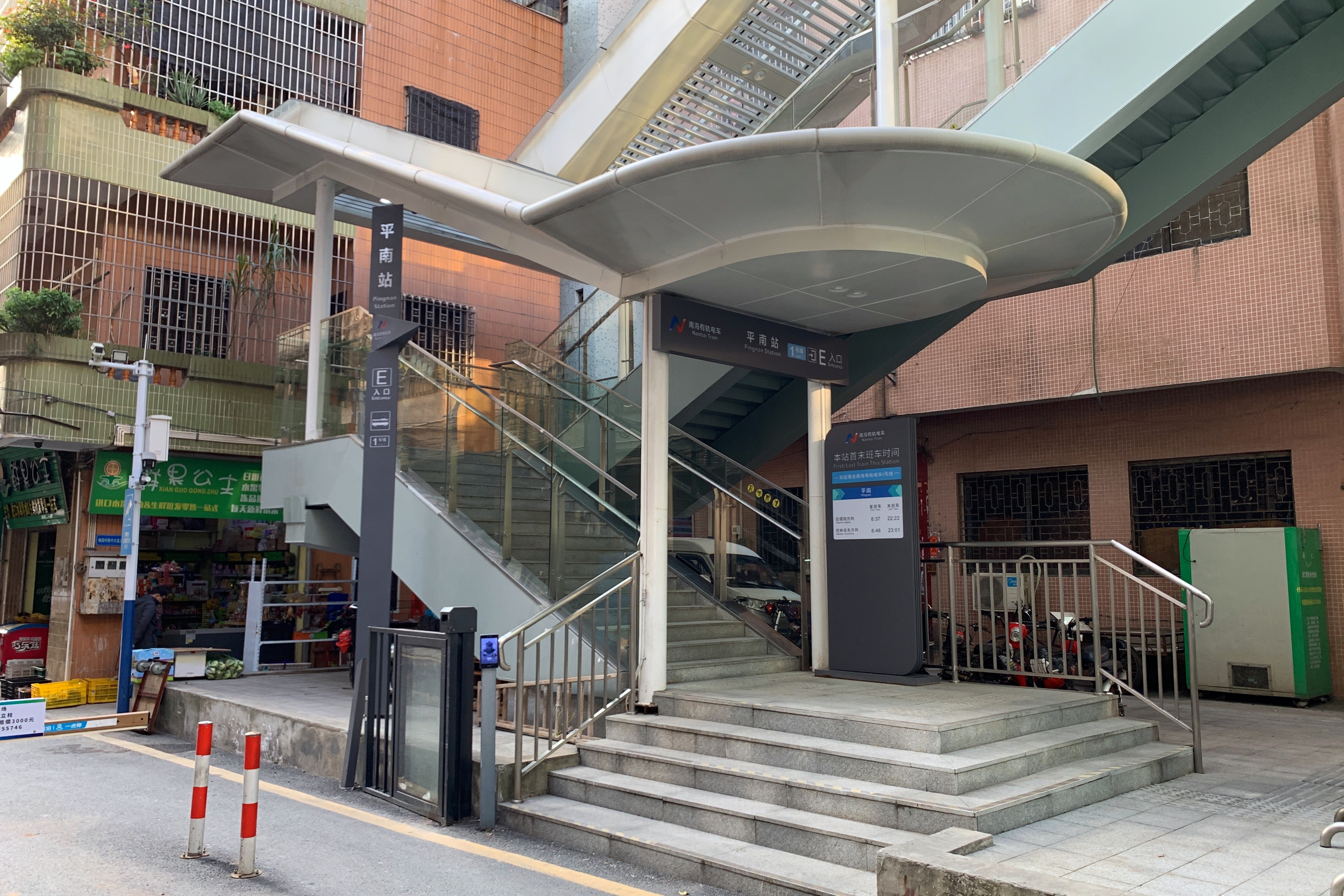
Entrance E
