= Zhongqu station =

Nanhai Tram Line 1 (Foshan Metro) station

Zhongqu 中区
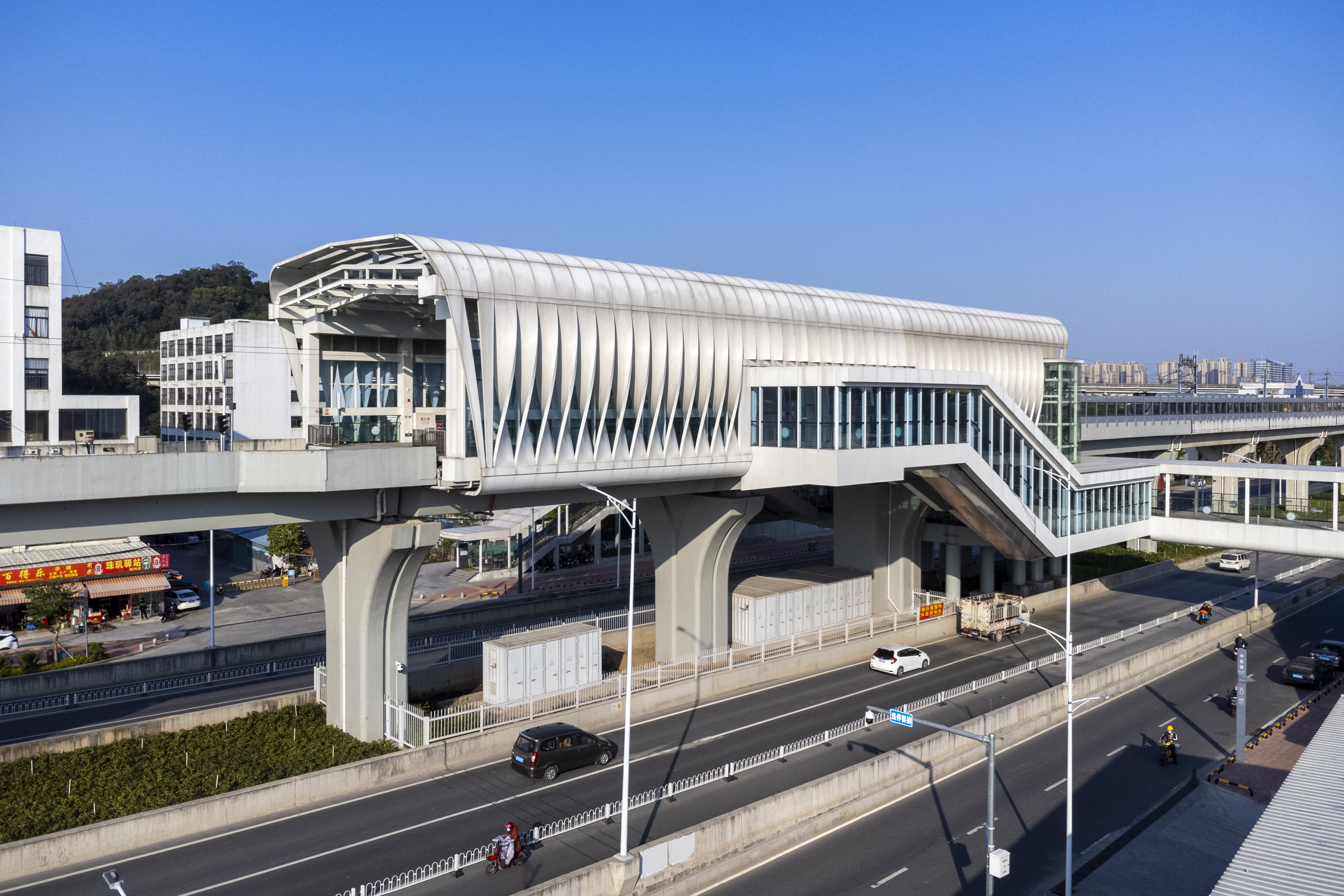
- Exterior

Chinese name
- Simplified Chinese: 中区站
- Traditional Chinese: 中區站
Transcriptions
Standard Mandarin
- Hanyu Pinyin: Zhōng Qū Zhàn
Yue: Cantonese
- Yale Romanization: Jūngkēui Jaahm
- Jyutping: Zung^{1}keoi^{1} Zaam^{6}

General information
- Location: Changjiang Road (长江路) east of Pingzhou Bridge (平洲大桥), Guicheng Subdistrict; Nanhai District, Foshan, Guangdong; China
- Coordinates: 23°1′42.13″N 113°13′13.91″E
- Operator: Foshan Metro Operation Co., Ltd.
- Line: Nanhai Tram Line 1
- Platforms: 2 (2 side platforms)
- Tracks: 2

Construction
- Structure type: Elevated
- Accessible: Yes

Other information
- Station code: TNH109

History
- Opened: 18 August 2021 (4 years ago)
- Former names: Xicun Road (西村路)

Services
Preceding station	Foshan Metro	Following station
Yuqijie towards Leigang	Nanhai Tram Line 1	Sanshanxinchengbei towards Linyuedong
Location

Zhongqu station (simplified Chinese: 中区站; traditional Chinese: 中區站; pinyin: Zhōng Qū Zhàn; Cantonese Yale: Jūngkēui Jaahm; lit. 'Central District station') is a light metro station on Nanhai Tram Line 1 of Foshan Metro, located in Foshan's Nanhai District. It opened on 18 August 2021.

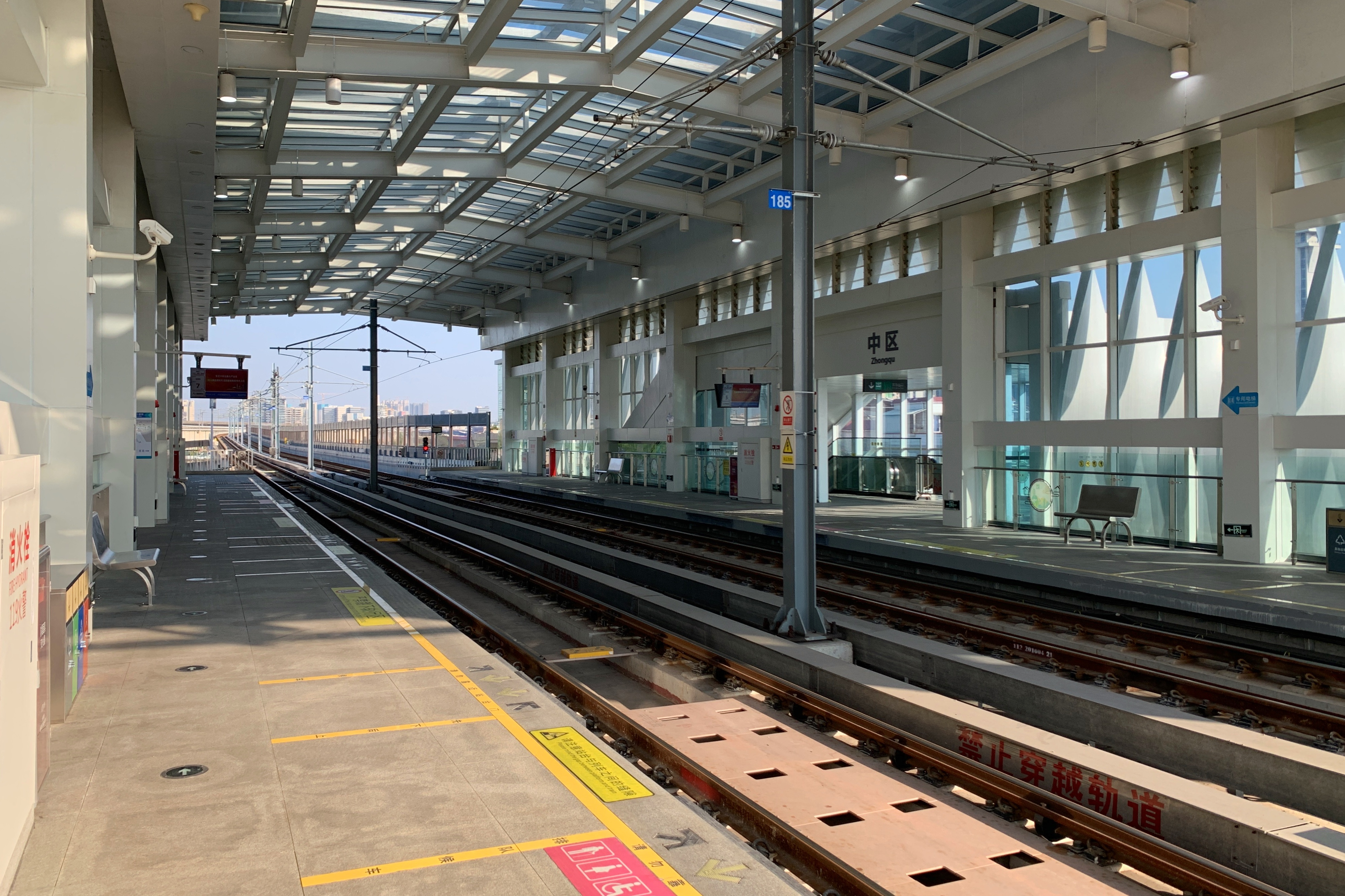
Platform

== Station layout ==
The station has two side platforms above Changjiang Road.

F3; Platforms	Side platform, doors will open on the right
F3; Platforms	Platform 1	TNH1 towards Leigang (Yuqijie)
F3; Platforms	Platform 2	TNH1 towards Linyuedong (Sanshanxinchengbei)
F3; Platforms	Side platform, doors will open on the right
F2; Concourse	Lobby	Ticket Machines, Customer Service, Police Station, Security Facilities
G	-	Exits A-D

=== Entrances/exits ===
The station has 4 points of entry/exit, of which Exit B is currently closed. All exits are equipped with elevators.

- A: Changjiang Road
- B: Changjiang Road
- C: Changjiang Road, Sanshan Forest Park
- D: Changjiang Road
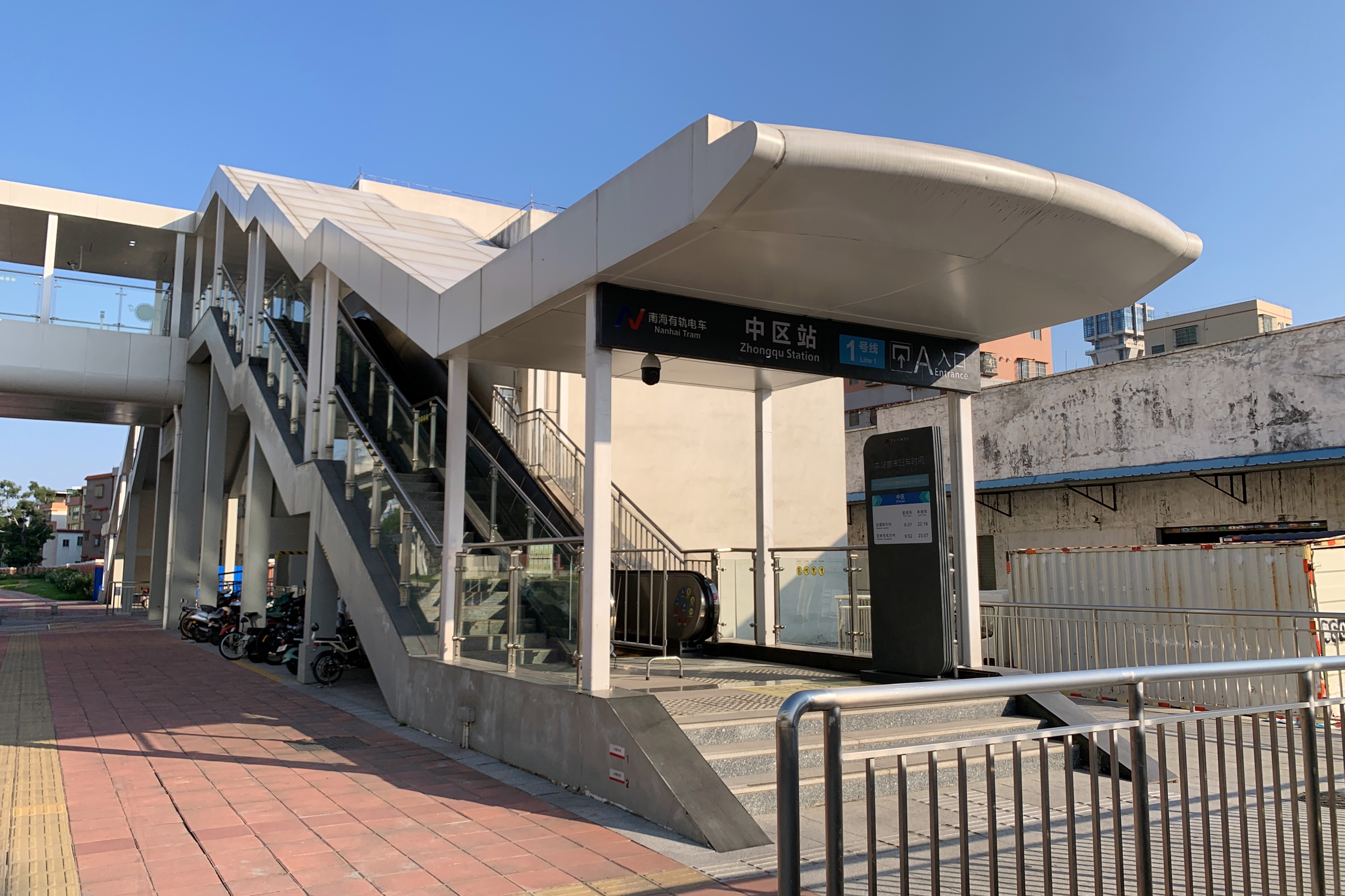
Entrance A

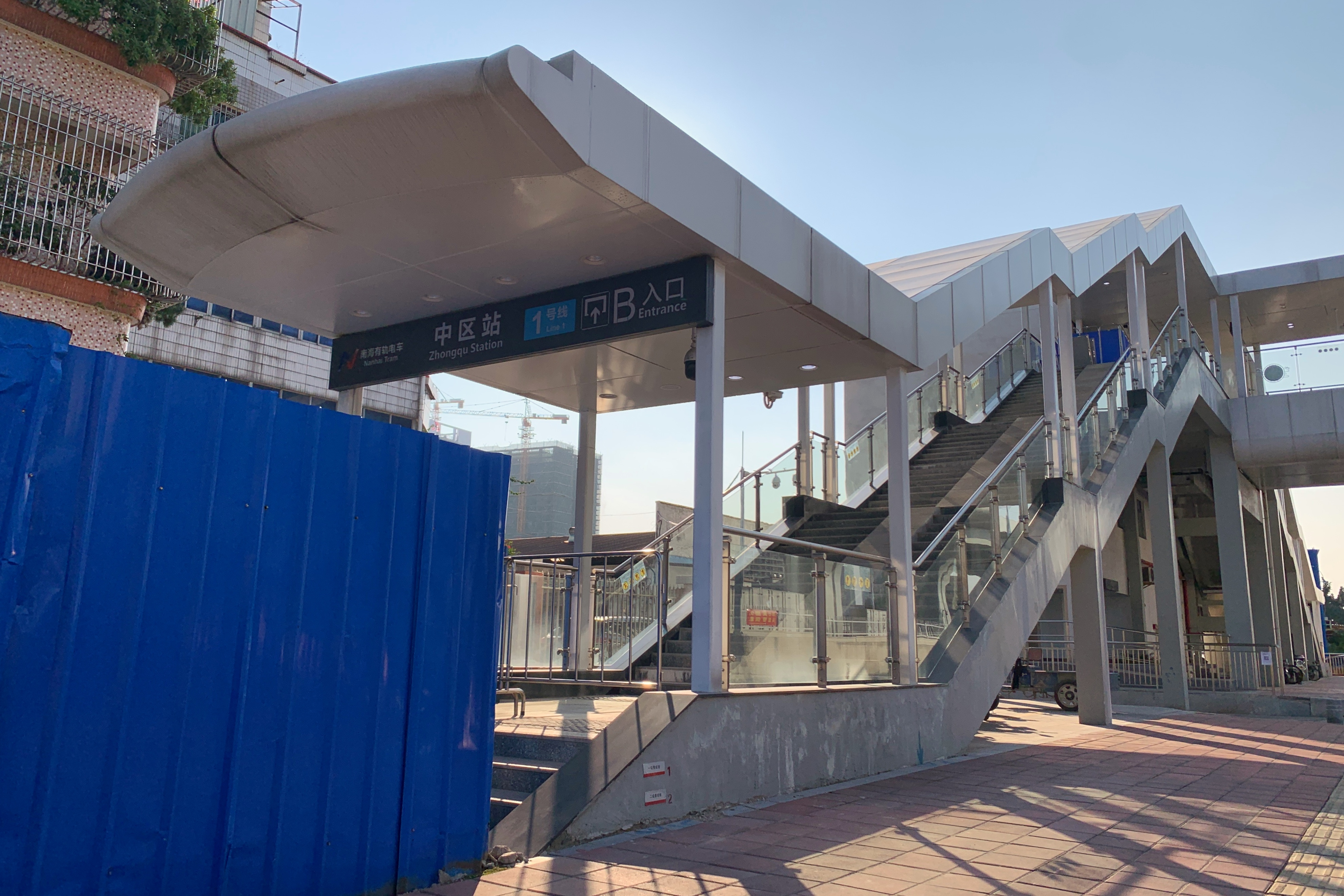
Entrance B

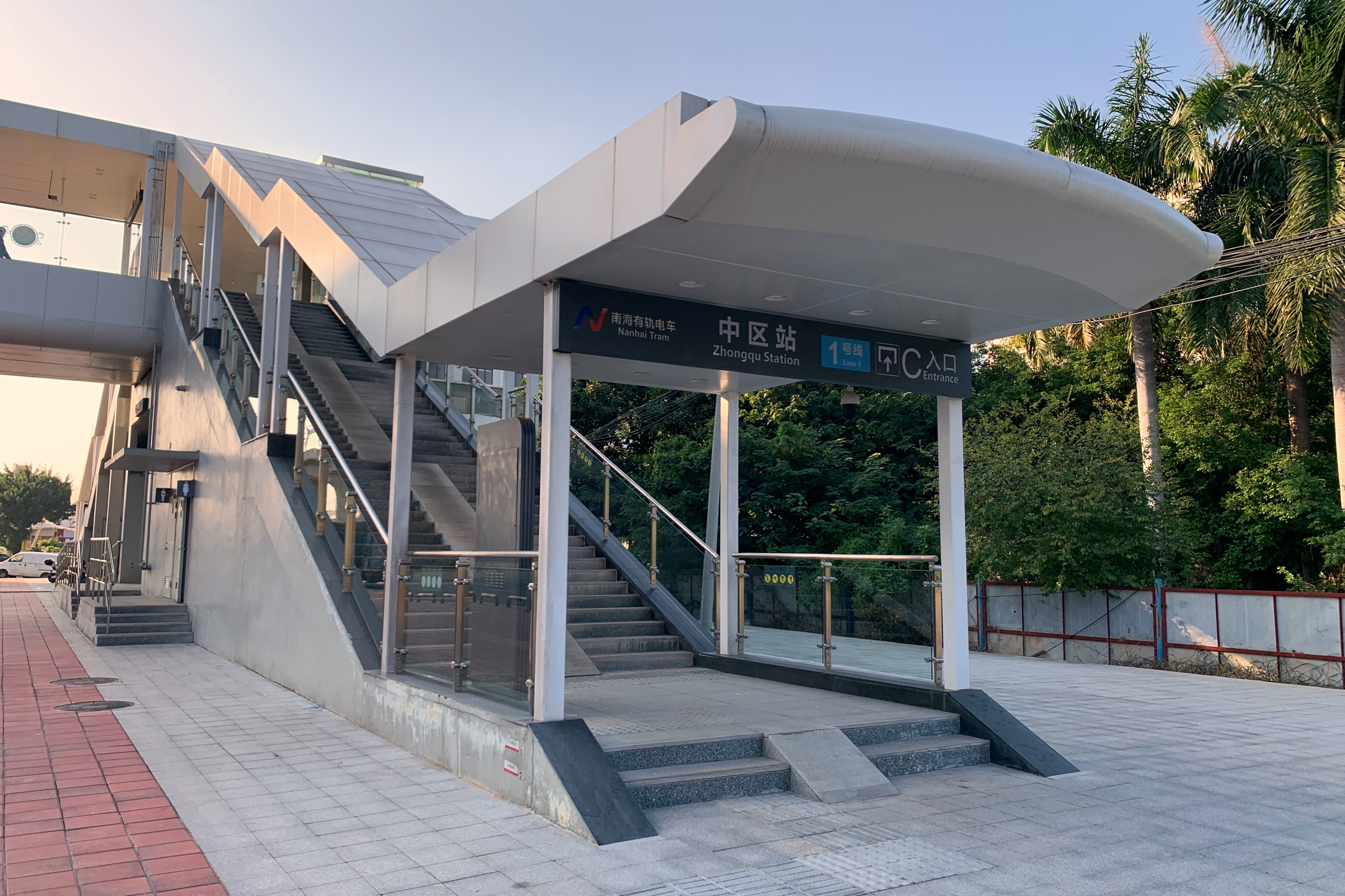
Entrance C

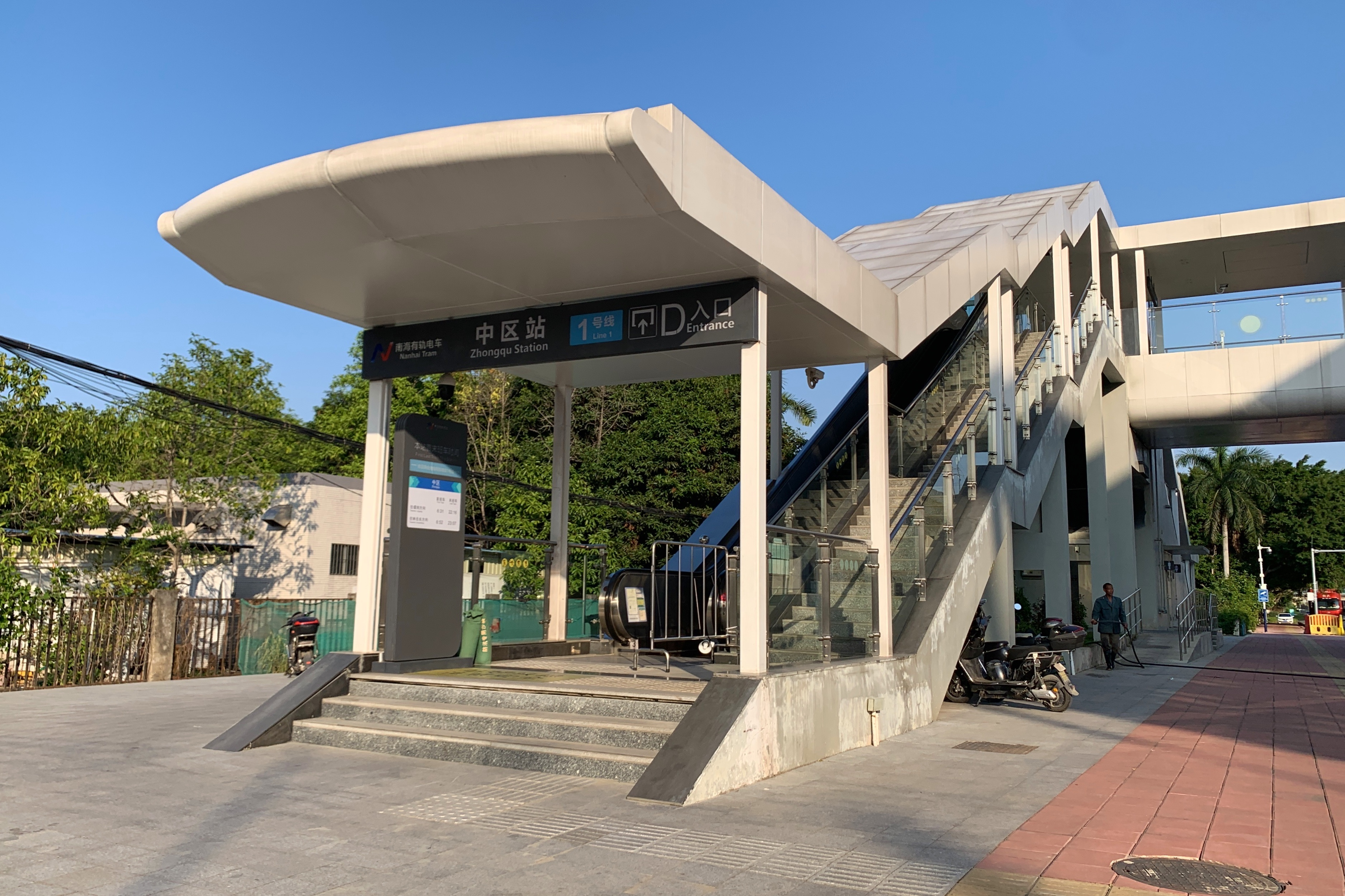
Entrance D
