= Jushu station =

Guangfo Metro station in Guangzhou

Coordinates: 23.0658°N 113.2120°E

Jushu 菊树
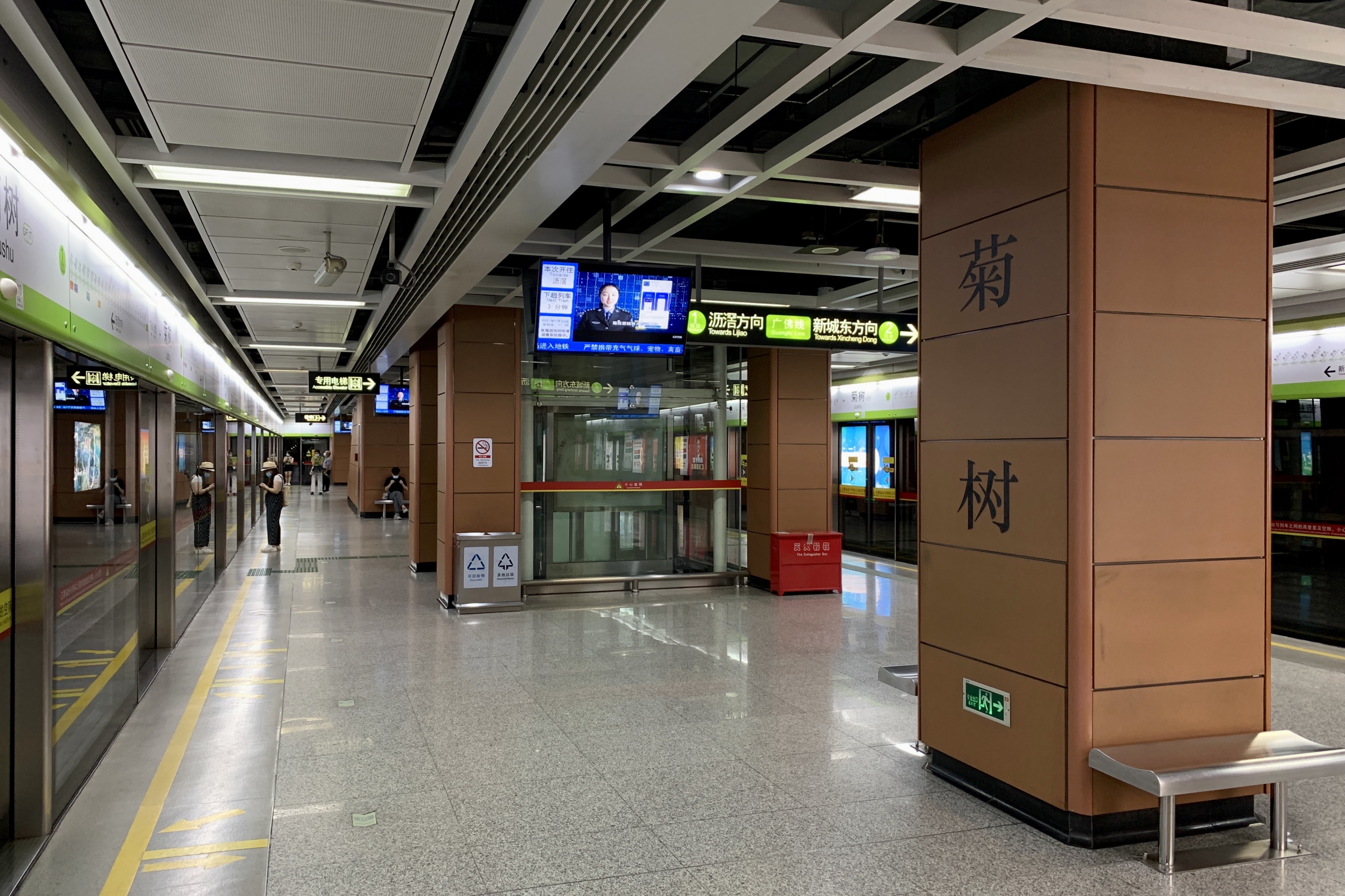
- Platform 1 (To Lijiao)

Chinese name
- Simplified Chinese: 菊树站
- Traditional Chinese: 菊樹站
Transcriptions
Standard Mandarin
- Hanyu Pinyin: Júshù Zhàn
Yue: Cantonese
- Jyutping: guk^{1}syu^{6} zaam^{6}

General information
- Location: Liwan District, Guangzhou, Guangdong; China
- Operated by: Foshan Railway Investment Construction Group Co. Ltd. Guangzhou Metro Co. Ltd.
- Line: Guangfo line
- Platforms: 2 (1 island platform)

Construction
- Structure type: Underground

Other information
- Station code: GF17

History
- Opened: 3 November 2010; 15 years ago

Services
Preceding station	Guangzhou Metro	Following station
Longxi towards Xincheng Dong	Guangfo line	Xilang towards Lijiao
Location

Jushu Station (Chinese: 菊树站), formerly Fangcun Sports Center Station (芳村体育馆站) or Jucun Station (菊村站) during planning, is a metro station on the Guangfo line of the Guangzhou Metro. It is located under the southwest of the Fangcun Sport Center (芳村体育中心) in Fangcun, Liwan District, Guangzhou. It started operation on 3 November 2010.

== Station layout ==
G	-	Exits
L1; Concourse	Lobby	Customer Service, Vending machines, ATMs
L2; Platforms	Platform 2	Guangfo towards Xincheng Dong (Longxi)
L2; Platforms	Island platform, doors will open on the left
L2; Platforms	Platform 1	Guangfo towards Lijiao (Xilang)

== Exits ==
Exit number	Exit location
Exit C	Zengnan Lu
Exit D	Zengnan Lu
