= Xiao Tian =

Chinese fencer

Deputy Director of State General Administration of Sports
- In office August 2005 – June 2015

Personal details
- Born: 1955 (age 70–71) Bengbu, Anhui
- Party: Chinese Communist Party (expelled)
- Children: Xiao Yang
- Education: Beijing Sport University

Xiao Tian (Chinese: 肖天; pinyin: Xiāo Tiān; born 1955) is a former Chinese fencer and sports administrator. He most recently held the post of the deputy director of the General Administration of Sport of China. On June 25, 2015, Xiao Tian was investigated by the Central Commission for Discipline Inspection. He is the first high-ranking implicated official being examined from sports system after the 18th National Congress of the Chinese Communist Party in 2012.

The Chinese government announced in September 2015 that it was to try Xiao Tian for multiple instances of corruption.

== Career ==
Before his political career, Xiao was a fencer in Anhui Fencing Team (安徽省击剑队). In 1977, Xiao Tian went to Beijing Sport University. He attend to National Sports Committee of China (today's State General Administration of Sports) in 1981. In 2005, Xiao became the deputy director of State General Administration of Sports.

On May 17, 2015, Xiao Tian sent the outstanding contribution cup to retired hurdler Liu Xiang in Shanghai Golden Grand Prix.

On June 25, 2015, Xiao Tian was placed under investigation by the Central Commission for Discipline Inspection for "serious violations of laws and regulations". His wife, Tian Ye (田桦), Deputy Secretary of Chinese Equestrian Association, also was placed under investigation.

On September 24, 2015, Xiao Tian was expelled from the Chinese Communist Party. He was sentenced to ten and a half years in prison on December 26, 2016.
