= Sonny Xiao =

Chinese businessperson

Yang "Sonny" Xiao
- 肖阳 (Chinese)
- Born: Beijing, China
- Education: Southern Methodist University
- Organization: Vice-president of Nenking Group

Xiao Yang
- Traditional Chinese: 肖陽
- Simplified Chinese: 肖阳
- Hanyu Pinyin: Xiāo Yáng
Transcriptions
Standard Mandarin
- Hanyu Pinyin: Xiāo Yáng

Yang "Sonny" Xiao (Chinese: 肖阳; pinyin: Xiāo Yáng), born in Beijing, is the vice-president of Nenking Group, in charge of Sport Culture.

== Early life ==
Xiao was born in Beijing, China. Xiao's father is Xiao Tian (Chinese: 肖天), former Deputy Director of the General Administration of Sport of China.

== Education ==
In 2005, Xiao earned a bachelor's degree from Southern Methodist University, United States. In 2012, Xiao earned an MBA.

== Career ==
In 2006, Xiao was in charge of Department of Business Development / Government Relations of Ticketmaster China, which was the exclusive ticketing agent of 2008 Summer Olympics.

In 2010, Xiao joined "Texas Legends" owners and became the first Chinese-born owner in NBDL. "Texas Legends" is a NBDL team under "Dallas Mavericks".

In 2013, Xiao joined "Morgan Stanley Huaxin Serurities" as IBD vice-president. In 2014, a file of "employment status of senior officer's children by Morgan Stanley Huaxin Serurities" was uploaded to the internet, showing that Sonny Xiao is the son of Xiao Tian, the Deputy Director of the General Administration of Sport of China at that time.

In 2015, Xiao turned to Hony Capital. His father Xiao Tian was "double-expelled" (means expelled from the CPC and public official work) in the same year.

In 2017, Xiao joined Nenking Group as the vice-president in charge of Sport Culture. He also became the president of basketball operations for the Guangzhou Long Lions.

In 2018, Nenking purchased a seat for Guangzhou in the Overwatch League. This investment was led by Sonny Xiao and was considered as a milestone of China eSports' professionalization and commercialization. He also became the CEO of the team later on.

== Personal life ==
Xiao's father Xiao Tian was sentenced to ten and a half years in prison on December 26, 2016 for corruption.
