= Nanhai Experimental High School =

Coordinates: 23.02714°N 113.16629°E

Location
- Dongping Er Road, Guicheng, Nanhai; Foshan, Guangdong; China

Information
- Type: Public Secondary Education
- Established: 2002
- Principal: Liang Jianwei
- Color: Green
- Website: www.hfedu.cn

Nanhai Experimental High School, the Affiliated High School of South China Normal University (simplified Chinese: 华南师范大学附属中学南海实验高级中学; traditional Chinese: 華南師範大學附屬中學南海實驗高級中學; pinyin: huánán shīfàn dàxué fùshǔ zhōngxué nánhǎi shíyàn gāojí zhōngxué; French: Lycée Expérimental de Nanhai, École secondaire affiliée à l'Université Normale de la Chine du Sud) is a campus in Nanhai District of the Affiliated High School of South China Normal University. It is a Chinese public School located in the Nanhai District of Foshan City, Guangdong Province, China. There is some evidence that there has been a school founded by Andrew Patton Happer on the site since 1888, but the Affiliated High School of South China Normal University of today was officially founded by the Chinese government in 1952.
