= Lishui, Guangdong =

Town in Nanhai District, Guangdong, China

Coordinates: 23.2011°N 113.1588°E

Lishui (Chinese: 里水; Jyutping: Leoi5 Seoi2) is a town in Nanhai District, Foshan, Guangdong, China. It covers an area of 148.28 square kilometres (57.25 sq mi) with registered population of 114,700 and floating population of 135,000.

== Link ==
- Official website of Lishui Town, Nanhai, Foshan (Chinese)
