= Dali, Guangdong =

Dali 大沥镇
- Town
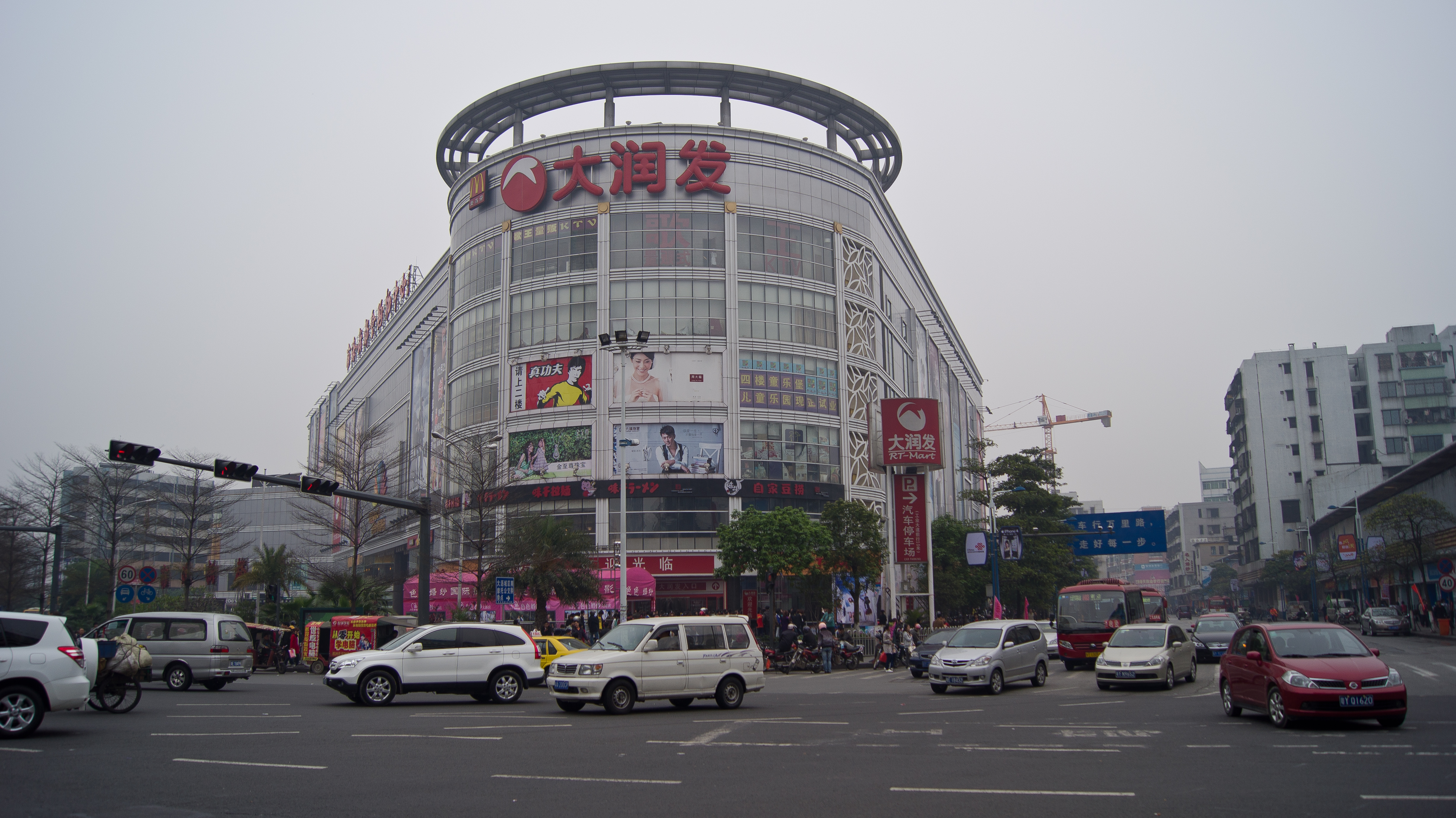
- Nanhai Metromall in Dali, Nanhai

- Location in Guangdong
- Coordinates: 23°06′43″N 113°06′17″E
- Country: People's Republic of China
- Province: Guangdong
- Prefecture-level city: Foshan
- District: Nanhai
- Time zone: UTC+8 (China Standard)

Dali (simplified Chinese: 大沥; traditional Chinese: 大瀝; pinyin: Dàlì; Jyutping: Daai6 Lek6) is a town in Nanhai District, located to the north of the downtown Foshan, Guangdong, People's Republic of China.

== Economy ==
Dali is mainly famous for its aluminium extrusion industry.

== Administration ==
As of 2020, it administers the following 42 residential neighborhoods:

- Liyuan Community (沥苑社区)
- Linan Community (沥南社区)
- Lixiong Community (沥雄社区)
- Lixing Community (沥兴社区)
- Zhijie Community (直街社区)
- Liucun Community (六村社区)
- Huaxia Community (华夏社区)
- Qiyang Community (岐阳社区)
- Jiayi Community (嘉怡社区)
- Dongting Community (洞庭社区)
- Jiangbei Community (江北社区)
- Libei Community (沥北社区)
- Lidong Community (沥东社区)
- Lixi Community (沥西社区)
- Lizhong Community (沥中社区)
- Yayao Community (雅瑶社区)
- Lianjiao Community (联滘社区)
- Fengchi Community (凤池社区)
- Shuitou Community (水头社区)
- Qicha Community (奇槎社区)
- Zhongbian Community (钟边社区)
- Dazhen Community (大镇社区)
- Xiebian Community (谢边社区)
- Caobian Community (曹边社区)
- Taiping Community (太平社区)
- Huangqi Community (黄岐社区)
- Liulian Community (六联社区)
- Michong Community (泌冲社区)
- Baisha Community (白沙社区)
- Shaxi Community (沙溪社区)
- Yanbu Community (盐步社区)
- Hedong Community (河东社区)
- Hexi Community (河西社区)
- Lian'an Community (联安社区)
- Pingdi Community (平地社区)
- Hengjiang Community (横江社区)
- Dongxiu Community (东秀社区)
- Yongya Community (雍雅社区)
- Liya Community (沥雅社区)
- Ligui Community (沥桂社区)
- Qicheng Community (岐城社区)
- Yuye Community (渔业社区)

== Transportation ==
The town is situated at the junction of two major highways, the 321 and 325 national highways.
