= Longxi station =

Guangfo Metro station in Guangzhou

Coordinates: 23.06579°N 113.19250°E

Longxi 龙溪
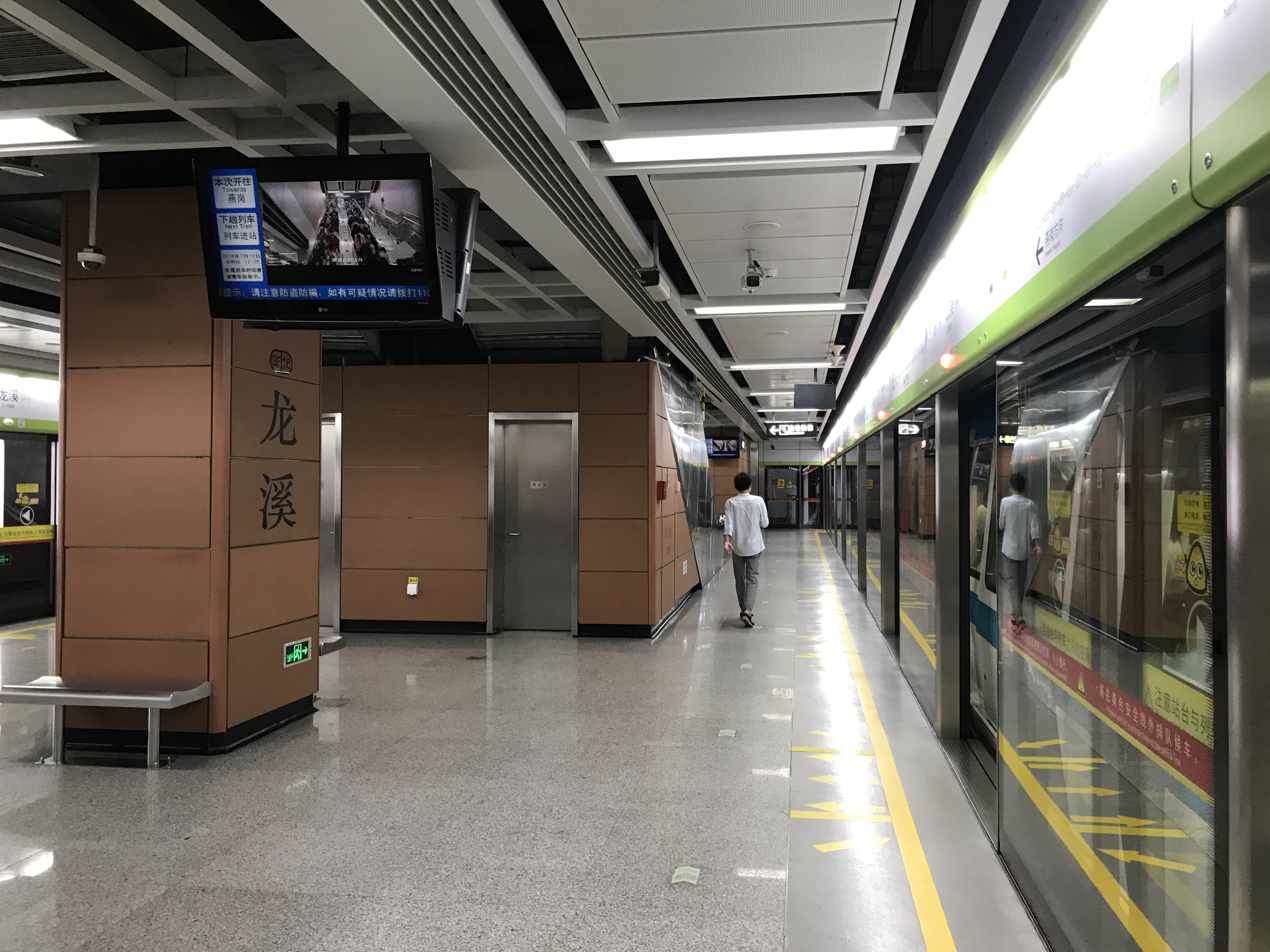

Chinese name
- Simplified Chinese: 龙溪站
- Traditional Chinese: 龍溪站
Transcriptions
Standard Mandarin
- Hanyu Pinyin: Lóngxī Zhàn
Yue: Cantonese
- Jyutping: lung^{4}kai^{1} zaam^{6}

General information
- Location: Liwan District, Guangzhou, Guangdong; China
- Operator: Foshan Railway Investment Construction Group Co. Ltd. Guangzhou Metro Co. Ltd.
- Line: Guangfo line
- Platforms: 2 (1 island platform)

Construction
- Structure type: Underground

Other information
- Station code: GF16

History
- Opened: 3 November 2010; 15 years ago

Services
Preceding station	Guangzhou Metro	Following station
Financial Hi-Tech Zone towards Xincheng Dong	Guangfo line	Jushu towards Lijiao
Location

Longxi Station (Chinese: 龙溪站), formerly Huaboyuan Station (花博园站) during planning, is a metro station on the Guangfo Line of the Guangzhou Metro. It is located under Longxi Avenue (龙溪大道) in the Liwan District of Guangzhou, near the Guangzhou Luxin Garden (广州鲁新园艺场). It started operation on 3 November 2010. This is the first station in Guangzhou when travelling eastbound on the Guangfo line.

== Station layout ==
G	-	Exits
L1; Concourse	Lobby	Customer Service, Vending machines, ATMs
L2; Platforms	Platform 2	Guangfo towards Xincheng Dong (Financial Hi-Tech Zone)
L2; Platforms	Island platform, doors will open on the left
L2; Platforms	Platform 1	Guangfo towards Lijiao (Jushu)

== Exits ==
Exit number	Exit location
Exit A	Longxi Dadao
Exit C	Longxi Dadao
