= Zhong Naixiong =

Chinese entrepreneur and billionaire (born 1963)

- 钟乃雄 (Chinese)
- Born: November 1963 (age 62); Huazhou, Guangdong, China
- Education: Jinan University
- Organization(s): Founder & board chairman of Nenking Group

Chinese name
- Traditional Chinese: 鍾乃雄
- Simplified Chinese: 钟乃雄
- Hanyu Pinyin: Zhōng Nǎixióng
Transcriptions
Standard Mandarin
- Hanyu Pinyin: Zhōng Nǎixióng
- Wade–Giles: Chung^{1} Nai^{3}-hsiung^{2}
Yue: Cantonese
- Yale Romanization: Jūng Náaih Hùhng
- Jyutping: Zung^{1} Naai^{5}-hung^{4}

Zhong Naixiong (Chinese: 钟乃雄; born November 1963) is a Chinese entrepreneur and billionaire. He is the founder and chairman of Nenking Group, a conglomerate based in Foshan, Guangdong.

Zhong keeps a low profile in his daily life, but is keen on developing sport culture career, his Nenking Group has owned and run its own CBA team Guangzhou Long-Lions since 2010, and has title-sponsorsed Hong Kong "Eastern Sports Club", including "Eastern Football Team" and "Eastern Basketball Team" since 2016. In 2018, he decided to step in esports, organizing an Overwatch League team named the "Guangzhou Charge".

== Life and career ==
=== Early life ===
In 1963, Zhong Naixiong was born in Huazhou, Maoming, Guangdong Province, China. After graduating from Jinan University, he had worked for "The People's Insurance Company (Group) of China" and "Ping An Insurance Company of China".

=== Entrepreneurship ===
In 1993, Zhong founded Guangdong Nenking Real Estate Development Co., Ltd founded. It was the predecessor of Nenking Group. On 28 March 1998, Zhong founded Nenking Holdings Group Co., Ltd.

=== Sports ===
Zhong is keen on sports, especially basketball. In 2010, Zhong acquired Shaanxi men's basketball club and named it the "Long-Lions", starting stepping in Sport Culture.

In 2016, acting as the white knight, Zhong poured around 30 million HK$ into Hong Kong "Eastern Sport Club" which was facing a financial crisis. As a result, Nenking got the title sponsorship of "Eastern Sports Club", including "Eastern Football Team" and "Eastern Basketball Team".

In 2018, Zhong started stepping in esports. Nenking got the Guangzhou franchise of the Overwatch League and organized an OWL team for Guangzhou. This investment of Zhong was considered as a milestone of China esports' professionalization and commercialization. The team is lately named as the "Guangzhou Charge".

== Social activity ==
In June 2009, Zhong donated CN¥ 1 million to his alma mater, Jinan University, for graduation ceremony innovation, mace manufacture and so on.

== Wealth ==
- Rupert Hoogewerf's China Rich List 2016: 10.5 billion CN¥, ranking 299.
- Rupert Hoogewerf's Global Rich List 2017: 1.5 billion US$, ranking 1479.
- Rupert Hoogewerf's China Rich List 2017: 8.7 billion CN¥, ranking 451.
- Rupert Hoogewerf's Global Rich List 2018: 1.5 billion US$, ranking 1954.
