= The One Winner =

Chinese Overwatch team

- Game: Overwatch
- Founded: 2017
- League: Overwatch Contenders
- Division: Pacific
- Region: China
- Team history: Miracle Team One; 2016–2017; The One Winner; 2018–2019; T1w.GZA; 2019; The One Winner; 2020–present
- Colors: Red, blue, white
- Owner: Cheng Xiao
- Head coach: Zhang Peng
- Regional titles: 1; 2018 Season 3
- Interregional titles: 0

The One Winner, or simply T1w, is a Chinese esports team for the video game Overwatch competing in Overwatch Contenders (OWC). The team is a former academy team for the Guangzhou Charge of the Overwatch League (OWL). The team was founded under the name Miracle Team One; after the formation of T1w Esports Club, the owner of the team, the team rebranded to The One Winner and rebranded, again, to T1w.GZA after becoming the academy team for the Charge. T1w plays in the China region of OWC, and since inception, they have won one OWC regional title and multiple other major tournaments not affiliated with Overwatch Contenders.

== Franchise history ==
=== 2016–2017: Miracle Team One ===
The franchise began in 2016 under the name Miracle Team One (MT1). The team entered the Chinese scene with high expectations, but failed to find much success. In 2017, they placed in the top four at the Overwatch Premier Series to qualify for the Overwatch APAC Premier 2017. However, the team produced disappointing results in the tournament, failing to move on past the group stages. The following month, MT1 was invited to the 2017 Nexus Cup; they were eliminated early from the tournament.

=== 2018–2019: The One Winner ===
In 2018, T1w Esports Club was officially established to manage competitive teams in PlayerUnknown's Battlegrounds, Wangzhe Rongyao (Kings of Glory), and Overwatch, and Miracle Team One was rebranded to The One Winner (T1w). The team competed in the first season of Overwatch Contenders China, and while they were able to qualify for the playoffs, T1w fell to Lucky Future Zenith in the semifinals by a score of 2–3. The following Contenders season, T1w, again, qualified for the playoffs, and fell to Lucky Future Zenith in the semifinals by a score of 2–3.

In between Contenders seasons, the team hit its stride, claiming multiple tournament victories. T1w found its first LAN tournament victory at LanStory Cup 2018 Guangzhou by defeating LinGan e-Sports in the finals. The following week, T1w placed second at the NetEase Esports X Tournament (NeXT) 2018 Summer, falling to RunAway in the finals. A few months later, the team successfully defended their LanStory Cup title, defeating Flag Gaming at the LanStory Cup 2018 Hangzhou finals and secured their second tournament title.

T1w continued their dominance in the group stages of Contenders China 2018 Season 3, as they posted a perfect 5–0 record and 20–0 map differential. The team blew through the playoffs – only dropping a single map – en route to defeating Flag Gaming in the finals and claiming the title of Overwatch Contenders China champions. A few weeks later, the team fell in a close 2–3 match to LGD Gaming in the semifinals of at NeXT 2018 Winter.

In Contenders China 2019 Season 1, The One Winner showed their flexibility as a team, being able to effectively run both GOATS (three tanks, three supports) and standard 2-2-2 compositions; they were able to, again, post a perfect record in the group stages. After defeating both Lucky Future and LGD Gaming by a score of 2–3 in the quarterfinals and semifinals, respectively, of the playoffs, the team was swept by the Chengdu Hunters academy team LGE.Huya in the finals. By placing second in their region, the team qualified for the Contenders Pacific Showdown, an interregional double-elimination tournament; T1w placed third in the event, losing only to the top two Korean Contenders teams. Following the Showdown, T1w picked up a pair of third-place finishes at NeXT 2019 Spring and LanStory Cup 2019 Summer.

=== 2019: T1w.GZA ===
On July 2, in the middle of Contenders China 2019 Season 2, it was announced that T1w would be competing as the academy team for the Guangzhou Charge of the Overwatch League, and the team rebranded to T1w.GZA. The Charge fielded their own academy team, known as Guangzhou Academy, but the team disbanded after only one season.

=== 2020: The One Winner ===
On February 7, 2020, the Charge ended their partnership with T1w.

== Seasons overview ==
=== Overwatch Contenders ===
Year	Season	Region	OWC regular season				Regional playoffs	Interregional events
Year	Season	Region	Finish (Note: Placements reflect standings in the team's respective group and not the entire region.)	Wins	Losses	Win %	Regional playoffs	Interregional events
The One Winner
2018	1	China	3rd	3	2	.600	Semifinals	None held
2018	2	China	3rd	3	2	.600	Semifinals	None held
2018	3	China	1st	5	0	1.000	Winners	None held
T1w.GZA
2019	1	China	1st	5	0	1.000	Runners-up	Pacific Showdown – Lower Finals
2019	2	China	3rd	3	2	.600	Quarterfinals	
Regular season record				19	6	.760		
Playoff record				7	4	.636		

=== Other tournaments ===
- 3rd – Overwatch Premier Series 2017
- 4th – Overwatch APAC Premier 2017
- 3rd – LanStory Cup 2018 Chengdu
- 1st – LanStory Cup 2018 Guangzhou
- 2nd – NetEase Esports X Tournament 2018 Summer
- 1st – LanStory Cup 2018 Hangzhou
- 3rd – NetEase Esports X Tournament 2019 Spring
- 3rd – LanStory Cup 2019 Summer

== Current roster ==
The One Winner roster
Players
Coaches

Role	Handle	Name	Nationality
Damage	Mijia	Tan Xujie	China
Damage			China
Damage	MoLanran	Yang Liao	China
Tank	Highbee	Zhang Zening	China
Tank	Silver3	Han Haibo	China
Support			China
Support	Zihee	Gong Zixi	China

Head coach

Zhang Peng

Legend:
- (I) Inactive
- (S) Suspended
- (2W) Two-way player
- Substitute
- (injured) Injury / Illness

Latest roster transaction: January 4, 2020.

== OWL buyouts and promotions ==
All Overwatch Contenders players are eligible to be promoted by their affiliated Overwatch League team or signed to any other Overwatch League during specified non-blackout periods.

=== 2018 ===
- DPS Cai "Krystal" Shilong was signed by new expansion franchise Hangzhou Spark on November 20.

== OWL affiliates ==
=== T1w.GZA ===
Guangzhou Charge (2019)
