= Guangzhou Charge =

Chinese professional esports team

Guangzhou Charge 广州冲锋
- Founded: 2 August 2018
- League: Overwatch League
- Region: East
- Team history: Guangzhou Charge (2018–present)
- Based in: Guangzhou, China
- Colors
- Owner: Zhong Naixiong
- General manager: Zheng “Extra” Jiawen
- Affiliation: Ultra Prime Academy
- Main sponsor: Herbalife Nutrition
- Website: Official website

Uniforms

Chinese name
- Simplified Chinese: 广州冲锋
- Traditional Chinese: 廣州衝鋒
Transcriptions
Standard Mandarin
- Hanyu Pinyin: Guǎngzhōu Chōngfēng

Guangzhou Charge (simplified Chinese: 广州冲锋; traditional Chinese: 廣州衝鋒; pinyin: Guǎngzhōu Chōngfēng) was a Chinese professional Overwatch esports team based in Guangzhou, Guangdong. The Charge compete in the Overwatch League (OWL) as a member of the league's East region. Founded in 2018, Guangzhou Charge began play as one of eight expansion teams in 2019 and is one of four professional Overwatch teams based in China. The team is owned by Nenking Group and is managed by the esports brand of Nenking, Ultra Prime Esports.

== Franchise history ==
=== OWL expansion ===
On 2 August 2018, Activision Blizzard announced that Nenking Group, owner of Guangzhou Loong Lions, purchased a seat for Guangzhou in Overwatch League. On 15 October 2018, Nenking announced that Sonny Xiao, the vice president of Nenking and the president of basketball operations for the Guangzhou Long Lions, would be the CEO of the team, Overwatch developer Eddy Meng would be the COO, and Overwatch management veteran Ethan Liu would be the general manager.

On 8 November, the Nenkeng Group announced that the Guangzhou team would be called the Guangzhou Charge. Two weeks later, the Charge announced nine players of their inaugural roster – four DPS, four supports, and one tank. The Charge signed Cho "J1N" Hyo-jin as the team's head coach on 3 December 2018.

=== Early years: 2019–present ===
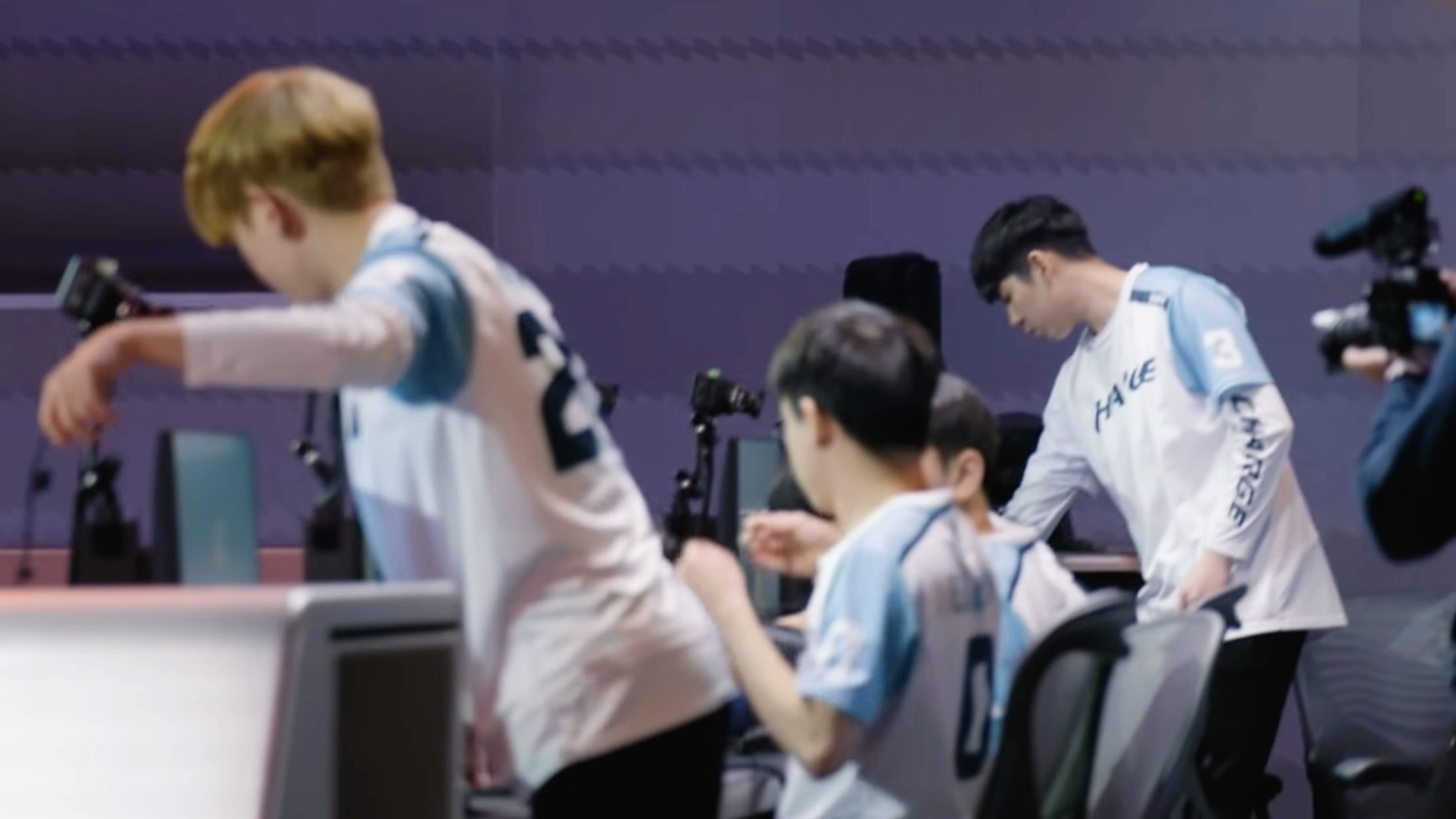
Charge on stage in 2019

On 15 February 2019, Guangzhou Charge played their first regular season OWL match against the Chengdu Hunters, in which the Charge lost 2–3. The team's first victory came a week later – a 4–0 sweep against the Dallas Fuel. The team had a subpar performance throughout the first three stages of the 2019 season, posting a 9–12 record through 21 matches with no stage playoff appearances. After the implementation of an enforced 2-2-2 role lock by the league, the Charge flourished, losing only one match in their final seven matches to give them a 15–13 record for the season. Finishing in ninth place in the overall standings, Guangzhou qualified for the Play-In Tournament, where they defeated the Chengdu Hunters in the first round, 4–1. However, they were unable to make it season playoffs, as they fell to the Seoul Dynasty by a score of 1–4 the following day.

Entering the 2020 season, the Charge parted ways with five of their 11 players, signing three new players later in the offseason. In the 2020 season, the Charge picked up their first midseason tournament title after defeating the Shanghai Dragons 4–2 in the Summer Showdown finals. At the end of the season, Guangzhou finished as one of the top two seeds in the Asia region. However, losses to the New York Excelsior and Seoul Dynasty in the Asia Bracket of 2020 Overwatch League playoffs eliminated the Charge from postseason contention.

In the 2021 offseason, the Charge released their entire Korean coaching staff, including head coach Cho "J1N" Hyo-jin. Several weeks later, they signed former San Francisco Shock assistant coach Lee "Arachne" Ji-won as their new head coach for the upcoming season. Guangzhou also made major changes to their roster in the offseason, parting ways with seven of their players and signing three new ones. After a 1–3 record to start the 2021 season, the Charge released head coach Lee "Arachne" Ji-won and assistant coach Kim "Daemin" Dae-min, on 6 May 2021. The Charge signed their former assistant coach Sung-woo "Sungwoo" Hong as their new head coach on 17 June. With a 5–11 regular season record, the Charge finished in second-to-last place in the Eastern region, only ahead of the winless Los Angeles Valiant.

== Personnel ==
=== Head coaches ===
Handle	Name	Seasons	Record	Notes	Ref.
J1N	Cho Hyo-jin	2019–2020	29–20 (.592)		
Arachne	Lee Ji-won	2021	1–3 (.250)	Released after four games in 2021.	
Sungwoo	Hong Sung-woo	2021–2023	17–24 (.415)	Released after nine games in 2023.	

== Awards and records ==
=== Seasons overview ===
Season	P	W	L	W%	Finish	Playoffs
2019	28	15	13	.536	6th, Pacific	Did not qualify
2020	21	14	7	.667	3rd, Asia	Lost in Asia Lower Round 1, 0–3 (Excelsior)
2021	16	5	11	.313	7th, East	Did not qualify
2022	24	9	15	.375	5th, East	Did not qualify

=== Individual accomplishments ===
Role Star selections

- Cr0ng (Nam Ki-cheol) – 2020

All-Star Game selections

- Shu (Kim Jin-Seo) – 2019, 2020
- Cr0ng (Nam Ki-cheol) – 2020

All-Star Game head coaches

- J1n (Cho Hyo-Jin) – 2020

== Academy team ==
On 13 March 2019, GZ Academy, also known as GZA, was founded as the academy team of Guangzhou Charge. After a 1–4 finish in their first season of Overwatch Contenders, team shut down on 30 May, citing a focus on preparations for the Charge's 2020 home arena and teamhouse. On 2 July, in the middle of the second season of 2019 Contenders, it was announced that the roster of Chinese Contenders team The One Winner (T1w) had been signed as the new academy team of Guangzhou Charge, rebranding themselves to T1w.GZA. In 2020, the Charge ended their partnership with T1w. Another OWC team Ignition One (IO) was rebranded to Ultra Prime Academy as the academy team of the Charge.
