= Ultra Prime Esports =

Chinese esports organization

- Short name: UP
- Sport: Esports
- Founded: 2020
- Owner: Nenking Group
- Divisions: Overwatch; League of Legends

Ultra Prime Esports, formed in 2020 by Nenking Group, is a professional esports franchise based in China. Ultra Prime Esports manages Nenking's esports teams, such as Guangzhou Charge.

== History ==
Nenking established a new esports brand "Ultra Prime" for Nenking's esports business on 28 August 2020. Ultra Prime Esports manages Nenking's esports teams, such as Guangzhou Charge of the Overwatch League. On 17 December 2020, Nenking acquired the LPL team of the Chinese esports franchise "eStar Gaming". On 29 March 2021, Nenking Esports Center had its grand opening. Located in GBA International Sports and Cultural Center, Nenking Esports Center will be the base of Ultra Prime Esports and all of Nenking's esports teams. Nenking also announced that "eStar Gaming", their League of Legends branch, had been rebranded to "Ultra Prime".

== Teams ==
=== Ultra Prime Academy (OWC) ===
On 8 August 2020, Nenking acquired an OWC team called "Ignition One (IO)" and rebranded the team to Ultra Prime Academy as the academy team of Guangzhou Charge.

=== Ultra Prime (LPL) ===
On 17 December 2020, LPL team eStar was acquired by Nenking. It was later renamed as "Ultra Prime" during the grand opening of Nenking Esports Center on 29 March 2021.

Ultra Prime roster
Players
Coaches

Role	Handle	Name	Nationality
Top	zs	Zhang Shuai	China
Top	Hery	Wang Heyong	China
Jungle	Ning	Gao Zhenning	China
Mid	Qing	Hu Jiaju	China
Bot	Doggo	Chiu Tzu-Chuan	Taiwan
Support	Baolan	Wang Liuyi	China

Head coach

Weng “Ratis” Yufan

Assistant coach(es)

Wang“Fishball” Yu

Legend:
- (I) Inactive
- (S) Suspended
- Substitute
- (injured) Injury / Illness

Roster updated 11 January 2023.
