= Nenking Group =

Chinese conglomerate

Nenking Group 能兴集团
- Type: Private
- Industry: Conglomerate
- Founded: 1998; 28 years ago in Foshan, Guangdong, China
- Founder: Zhong Naixiong
- Headquarters: Foshan, Guangdong
- Area served: China
- Key people: Zhong Naixiong (chairman); Xiao Yang (vice-president)
- Services: Real estate, property management, Financial, Sport culture, Pharmaceuticals, overseas investment, Trade purchases
- Subsidiaries: Guangzhou Loong Lions
- Website: www.nenking.cn

Nenking Group
- Simplified Chinese: 能兴集团
- Traditional Chinese: 能興集團
Transcriptions
Standard Mandarin
- Hanyu Pinyin: Néngxīng Jítuán

Alternative Chinese name
- Simplified Chinese: 南海能兴
- Traditional Chinese: 南海能興
Transcriptions
Standard Mandarin
- Hanyu Pinyin: Nánhǎi Néngxīng

Nenking Group (simplified Chinese: 能兴集团; traditional Chinese: 能興集團; pinyin: Néngxīng Jítuán), or Nanhai Nenking (simplified Chinese: 南海能兴; traditional Chinese: 南海能興; pinyin: Nánhǎi Néngxīng), is a Chinese conglomerate founded on 28 March 1998 and based in Foshan, Guangdong, providing Real Estate, Property Management, Financial, Sports Culture, Pharmaceuticals, Investment Abroad, Trade Purchases services over the Pearl River Delta Metropolitan Region of China.

Nenking is the owner of a CBA team called the "Guangzhou Loong Lions", and it is also the title sponsor of Hong Kong "Eastern Sports Club", including "Eastern Football Team" and "Eastern Basketball Team". In 2018, Nenking started stepping in esports, organizing an OWL team for Guangzhou named the "Guangzhou Charge".

== History ==
- In 1993, Guangdong Nenking Real Estate Development Co., Ltd founded. It was the predecessor of Nenking Group.
- On 28 March 1998, Nenking Holdings Group Co., Ltd founded.
- In 2010, Nenking acquired Shaanxi men's basketball club and named it the "Long-Lions".
- On 12 August 2016, Hong Kong sports powerhouse "Eastern Sports Club" announced that Nenking got the title sponsorship of the Club", which including Football Team and Basketball Team. "Eastern" was facing a financial crisis before this and Nenking, acting as the white knight, poured around 30 million HK$ into "Eastern".
- On 7 March 2017, "Rupert Hoogewerf's Global Rich List 2017" released. Nenking's founder and chairman Zhong Naixiong was on the list for the first time for 1.5 billion US$ (≈ 10.5 billion CN¥) wealth, ranking 1479.
- On 2 August 2018, Nenking started stepping in esports. It got the Guangzhou franchise of the Overwatch League and organized an OWL team for Guangzhou. The team is lately named as the "Guangzhou Charge".
- On 28 August 2020, Nenking established a new esports brand, "Ultra Prime" for Nenking's esports business. Ultra Prime Esports manages all Nenking's esports teams, such as Guangzhou Charge of the Overwatch League.
- On 17 December 2020, Nenking acquired the LPL team of the Chinese esports franchise "eStar Gaming".
- On 29 March 2021, Nenking Esports Center grand opened. Located in GBA International Sports and Cultural Center, Nenking Esports Center will be the base of Ultra Prime Esports and all Nenking's esports teams. Nenking also announced that "eStar Gaming" LOL Branch was rebranded to "Ultra Prime" LOL Branch.

=== Sochaux ===
In April 2020, Nenking Group officially became the owner of the FC Sochaux-Montbéliard after reaching an agreement with Ledus, a subsidiary of Hongkongese group Tech Pro Technology Development. Zhong Naixiong is also appointed as the chairman of Sochaux, while Samuel Laurent is appointed as a executive director general.

During the 2022–23 season, the club faced financial difficulties and needed a capital injection from Nenking in order to remain in the French Ligue 2. In July 2023, Nenking announced that they wouldn't inject capital due to Chinese real estate crisis and the DNCG (the organization responsible for monitoring and overseeing the accounts of professional association football clubs in France) relegated the club to National (the third tier of French football).

Later, Romain Peugeot concluded an agreement for a takeover offer allowing Nenking Group to remain a 33% shareholder of FC Sochaux-Montbelliard. However, Nenking will not pay his commitment. Following this decision, FC Sochaux-Montbelliard faces a potential cessation of all payments and a possible administrative relegation to lower divisions.

After many weeks of important mobilization of local investors including Jean-Claude Plessis and Pierre Wantiez, Nenking signed an agreement to sell the club to newly-created FCSM 2028.

== Major subsidiaries ==
- Real estate
  - Guangdong Nenking Real Estate Development Co., Ltd
- Property management
  - Nanhai Nenking Property Management (Foshan) Co., Ltd
- Financial
  - Foshan CFP Financial Co., Ltd
- Sports Culture
  - Basketball
    - Guangzhou Long-Lions (Chinese Basketball Association)
    - Hong Kong Eastern Long Lions (Hong Kong A1 Division & ASEAN Basketball League)
    - Macau Black Bears (ASEAN Basketball League)
  - Football
    - Hong Kong Eastern Long Lions (Hong Kong Premier League)
    - FC Sochaux-Montbéliard (Ligue de Football Professionnel - Ligue 2)
  - Esports "Ultra Prime"
    - Guangzhou Charge (Overwatch League)
      - Ultra Prime Academy (Overwatch Contenders)
    - Ultra Prime (League of Legends Pro League)
  - Arenas
    - GBA International Sports and Cultural Center
    - Tianhe Gymnasium
    - Hoop-Battle
- Pharmaceuticals
  - Nanhai Longtime Pharmaceuticals Co., Ltd
- Overseas investment
  - First Capital Securities Co., Ltd
  - Nanhai Rural Commercial Bank
- Trade purchases
  - Guangdong Nenking Import and Export Co., Ltd
