= Rupert Hoogewerf =

British researcher and accountant

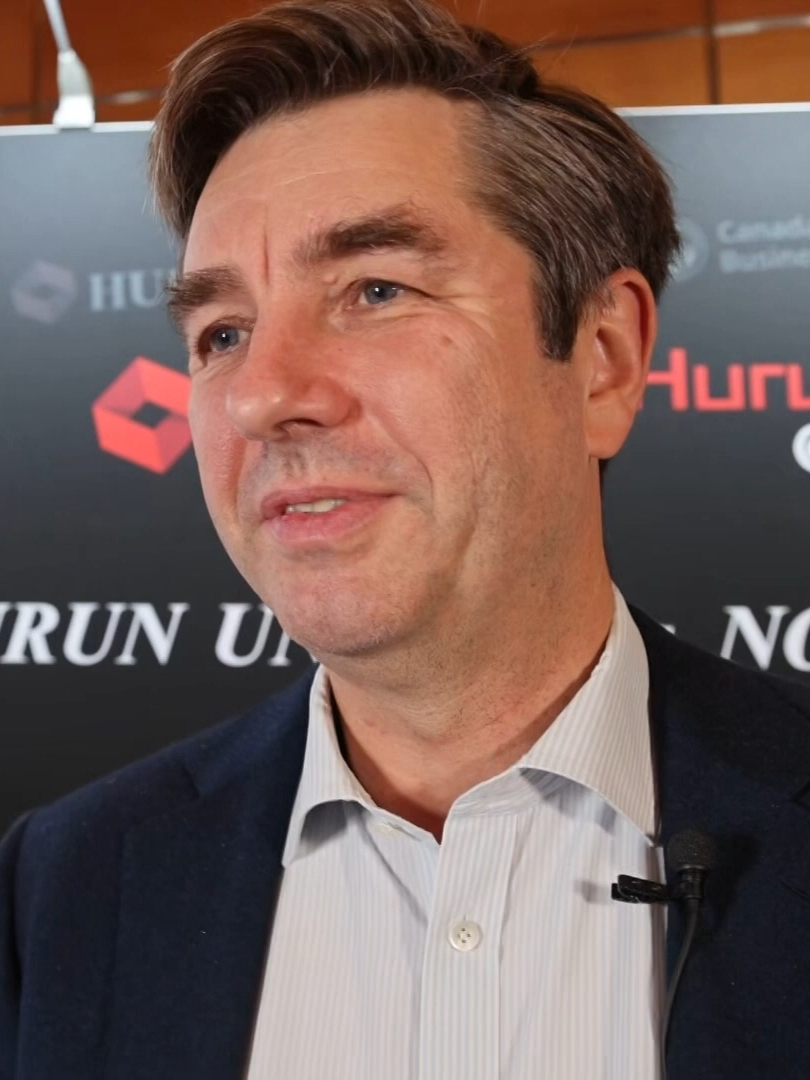
- Hoogewerf in 2023
- Born: Rupert Hoogewerf; 3 May 1970 (age 56); Luxembourg
- Education: Durham University (BA); Renmin University of China
- Occupations: Researcher, accountant
- Known for: Hurun Report
- Title: Chairman and Chief Researcher of Hurun Report
- Children: 3
- Parent(s): Francis and Angela Hoogewerf

Chinese name
- Traditional Chinese: 胡潤
- Simplified Chinese: 胡润
Transcriptions
Standard Mandarin
- Hanyu Pinyin: Hú rùn

Rupert Hoogewerf (born 1970), also known by his Chinese name Hu Run (Chinese: 胡润; pinyin: Hú Rùn), is a British-Luxembourgish businessman, currently the chairman and chief researcher of Hurun Inc, best known for the "Hurun Rich List", a ranking of the wealthiest individuals.

== Early life ==
Hoogewerf was born in 1970 in Luxembourg, son of Francis and Angela Hoogewerf. He graduated from Durham University (St Cuthbert's Society) in 1993. Before that, he was at Eton College and St Ronan's School.

== Career ==
=== Accountant ===
After university, Hoogewerf, as a qualified chartered accountant, worked for seven years at Arthur Andersen in London and Shanghai.

=== Hurun Report ===
Hoogewerf launched the Hurun Report in 1999 in London, promoting entrepreneurship through its lists and research.

The Hurun Report is best known for the Hurun Rich List, which ranks wealthy entrepreneurs in China, India and globally. It also publishes the Hurun Start-up series, which tracks early-stage companies.

The Hurun Start-up series begins with the Hurun Under30s, Under35s and Under40s awards recognizing the most successful founders under the ages of 30, 35 and 40. Next up are Hurun Cheetahs, most likely to go unicorn with five years and Hurun Gazelles, most likely to go unicorn within three years. The culmination of the start-up series is the Hurun Global Unicorn Index, start-ups from the 2000s, not yet listed and worth US$1 billion.

=== Hurun India ===
Hurun India was founded in India by Rupert Hoogewerf and Anas Rahman Junaid in 2012. Hoogewerf met Junaid in Oxford, and thought this was the right time to start Hurun in India.GROHE and Hurun India launch 'Builders of Tomorrow'

=== Other works ===
Other lists include the Hurun Global Highschools List, ranking the world's best independent high schools, the Hurun Philanthropy List, ranking the biggest philanthropists, the Hurun Art List, ranking the world's most successful artists alive today.

== Awards ==
Hoogewerf in November 2018 was made a professor of Practice for Durham University Business School, in recognition of a substantial lifetime contribution to the advancement and application of entrepreneurship in China and India.

== Personal life ==
Hoogewerf is married and lives with his wife and three children in Oxford, UK.
