= Nanhai, Foshan =

Nanhai 南海区 Namhoi
- District
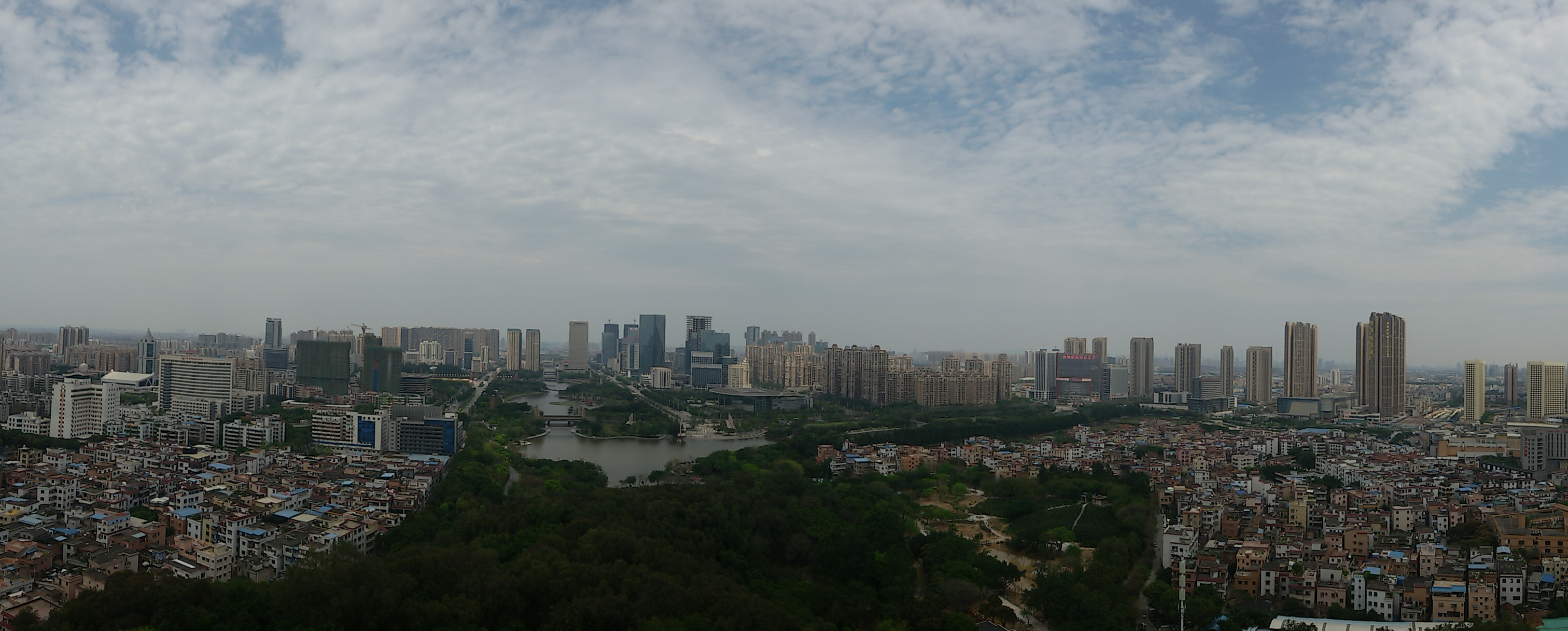
- Guicheng Subdistrict in Nanhai
- Coordinates: 23°05′46″N 113°08′34″E
- Country: People's Republic of China
- Province: Guangdong
- Prefecture-level city: Foshan

Area
  - Total: 1,074 km^{2} (415 sq mi)

Population (2020 Census)
  - Total: 3,667,247
  - Density: 3,415/km^{2} (8,844/sq mi)
- Time zone: UTC+8 (China Standard)
- Postal code: 528200
- Website: http://www.nanhai.gov.cn/

Nanhai, Foshan
- Simplified Chinese: 南海区
- Traditional Chinese: 南海區
- Jyutping: naam4 hoi2 keoi1
- Cantonese Yale: Nàahmhói Kēui
- Hanyu Pinyin: Nánhǎi Qū
Transcriptions
Standard Mandarin
- Hanyu Pinyin: Nánhǎi Qū
- Wade–Giles: nan^{2}hai^{3}qu^{1}
Yue: Cantonese
- Yale Romanization: Nàahmhói Kēui
- Jyutping: naam4 hoi2 keoi1

Alternative Chinese name
- Chinese: 南海
- Jyutping: naam4 hoi2
- Cantonese Yale: Nàahmhói
- Hanyu Pinyin: Nánhǎi
- Postal: Namhoi
Transcriptions
Standard Mandarin
- Hanyu Pinyin: Nánhǎi
- Wade–Giles: nan^{2}hai^{3}
Yue: Cantonese
- Yale Romanization: Nàahmhói
- Jyutping: naam4 hoi2

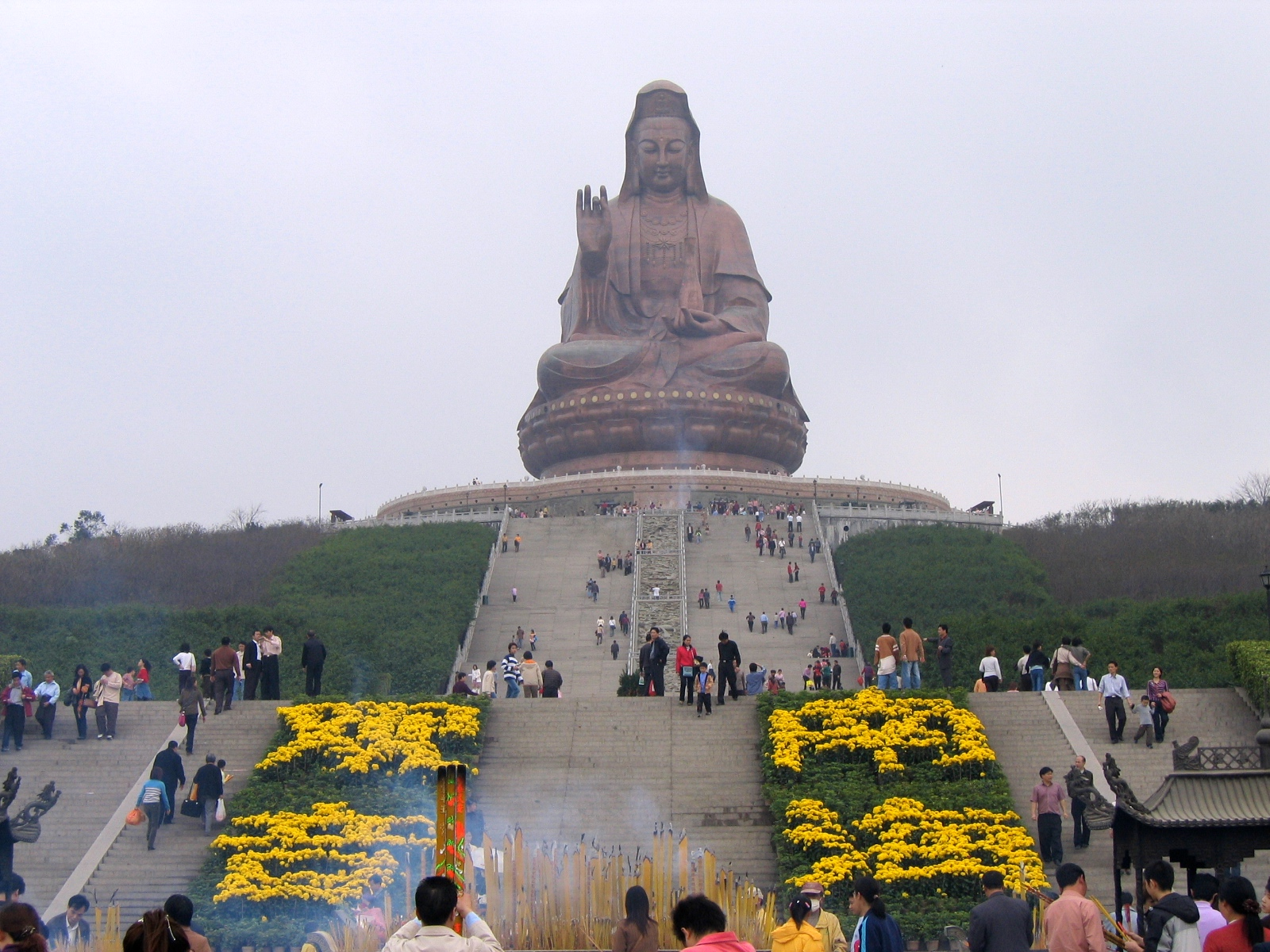
Statue of Guan Yin on Mount Xiqiao, in Nanhai

Nanhai District (simplified Chinese: 南海区; traditional Chinese: 南海區), or Namhoi (from Cantonese, Jyutping: naam4 hoi2), is a district of Foshan, Guangdong, China. Its government is the first to have developed e-government informatization at the county level division in China.

== History ==
Establishment of Nanhai is traditionally attributed two brothers carrying their father's bowls in 1271. They were fleeing south from the Mongols on a bamboo raft when a violent storm shipwrecked them and broke all the bowls. The brothers settled down there and the position of the wreck is commemorated by a shrine. This area was named Broken Bowls Point.

On 15 February 1921, the eastern part of Nanhai County was ceded to the newly established City of Guangzhou which became part of what is now western part of Liwan. On 26 June 1951, Foshan Town (present Chancheng) was ceded to the newly established City of Foshan. Nanhai County was upgraded into a county-level city on 2 September 1992 until 8 December 2002 Nanhai was consolidated as a district of Foshan.

== Administration division ==
Nanhai was a county-level city until December 8, 2002, when it became a district of Foshan prefecture-level city.

Name	Chinese (S)	Hanyu Pinyin	Population (2020)	Area (km^{2})
Guicheng Subdistrict	桂城街道	Guìchéng Jiēdào	732,909	84.16
Lishui town	里水镇	Lǐshuǐ Zhèn	412,489	75.38
Jiujiang town	九江镇	Jiǔjiāng Zhèn	218,345	94.75
Danzao town	丹灶镇	Dānzào Zhèn	239,360	143.50
Dali town	大沥镇	Dàlì Zhèn	789,568	95.90
Shishan town	狮山镇	Shīshān Zhèn	955,297	330.60
Xiqiao town	西樵镇	Xiqiáo Zhèn	319,279	176.63

=== E-government ===
Nanhai was designated by the central government as a pilot city for e-government and informatization in 2001.

== Transportation ==
=== Public transport ===
On November 3, 2010, the first phase of the Guangfo Line commenced operation, passing through Nanhai with five stations: Guicheng Station, Nangui Road Station, Leigang Station, Qiandeng Lake Station, and Financial High-tech Zone Station. Passengers could use transportation cards including Guangfutong, Yangchengtong, and Lingnantong for metro rides. On December 28, 2021, Foshan Metro Line 2 opened to traffic, featuring two stations in Nanhai District: Linyue West Station and Linyue East Station. On August 23, 2024, the Southern Section of the Post-Phase Extension of Foshan Metro Line 3 began operation, serving three stations in Nanhai District: Guicheng Station, Xiyue Station, and Diejiao Station. On the same day, the Northern Section of the Post-Phase Extension commenced service with nine stations in Nanhai District: Foshan University Station, Nanhai University Town Station, Bo'ai Central Road Station, Kesheng Road Station, Xingye East Road Station, Foshan West Railway Station, Luocun Station, Xiaode East Station, and Lianhe Station.

On 18 August 2021, the first section of the Nanhai Tram, which is technically a light rail system, opened in between Leigang station of Guangfo Line and Sanshanxinchengbei, which was extended by a second section towards Linyuedong on 22 November 2022. A further extension connecting the line with Guangzhou South railway station is planned.

=== Bike ===
Following the 2010 Asian Games in Guangzhou, public bicycles became available within the Guicheng area for community convenience. On September 15, 2021, Guicheng's public bicycle service officially ceased operations.

== Notable people ==
- Kang Tongbi
- Kang Youwei
- Lin Liang
- Wong Fei Hung
- Ip Man
- Tony Leung Ka-fai
- Antonio Ng
- Tan Sri Datuk Amar Stephen Kalong Ningkan
- Zhan Tianyou
- Zhong Naixiong

== See also ==
- Nanhai Experimental High School
- Nenking Group
