= Xiadong station =

Nanhai Tram Line 1 (Foshan Metro) station

Xiadong 夏东
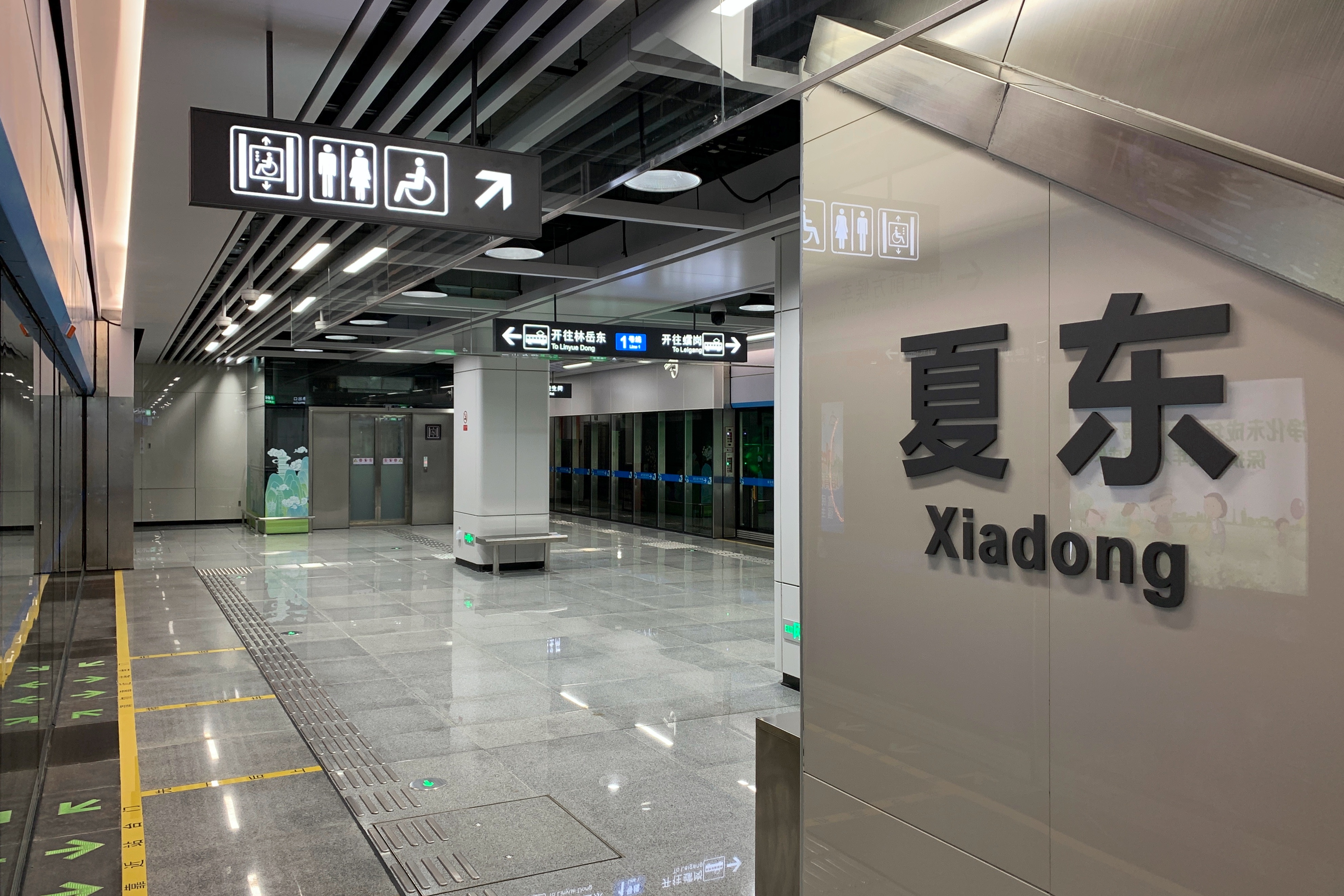
- Platform

Chinese name
- Simplified Chinese: 夏东站
- Traditional Chinese: 夏東站
Transcriptions
Standard Mandarin
- Hanyu Pinyin: Xiàdōng Zhàn
Yue: Cantonese
- Yale Romanization: Hahdūng Jaahm
- Jyutping: Haa^{6}dung^{1} Zaam^{6}

General information
- Location: Fork of Foping 3rd Road (佛平三路), Foping 4th Road (佛平四路) and Juyuan North Road (聚元北路), Guicheng Subdistrict; Nanhai District, Foshan, Guangdong; China
- Coordinates: 23°2′13.70″N 113°10′34.46″E
- Operator: Foshan Metro Operation Co., Ltd.
- Line: Nanhai Tram Line 1
- Platforms: 2 (1 island platform)
- Tracks: 2

Construction
- Structure type: Underground
- Accessible: Yes

Other information
- Station code: TNH104

History
- Opened: 18 August 2021 (4 years ago)
- Former names: Juyuan Road (聚元路)

Services
Preceding station	Foshan Metro	Following station
Xiaxi towards Leigang	Nanhai Tram Line 1	Kangyi Park towards Linyuedong
Location

Xiadong station (simplified Chinese: 夏东站; traditional Chinese: 夏東站; pinyin: Xiàdōng Zhàn; Cantonese Yale: Hahdūng Jaahm) is a light metro station on Nanhai Tram Line 1 of Foshan Metro, located in Foshan's Nanhai District. It opened on 18 August 2021.

There is a ceramic cultural art wall installation on the concourse, which shows the traditional Cantonese residential architecture of Wok Ear House.

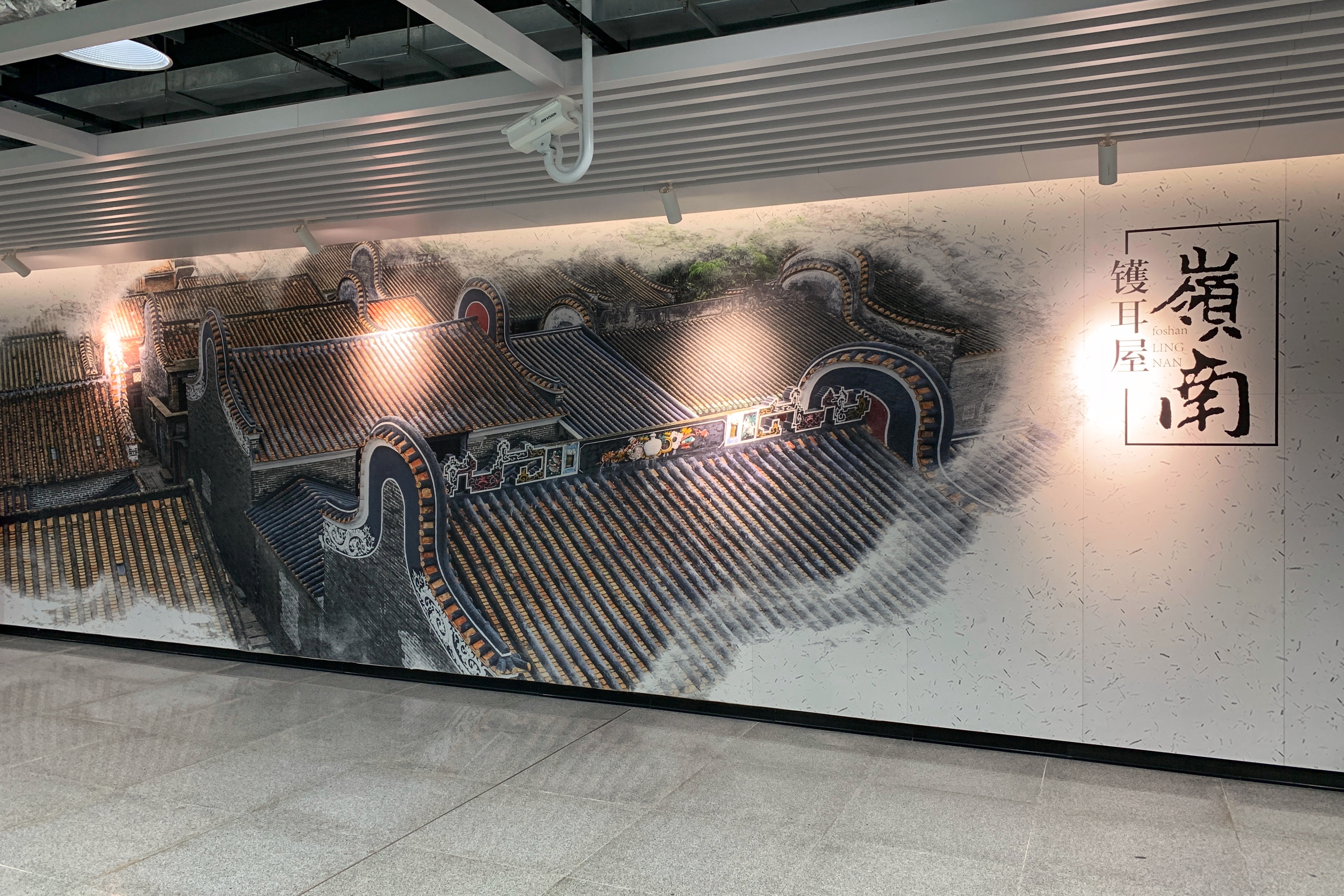
Cultural art wall installation

== Station layout ==
The station has an island platform under Foping 3rd Road.

G	-	Exits A & B
L1; Concourse	Lobby	Ticket Machines, Customer Service, Shops, Police Station, Security Facilities
L2; Platforms	Platform 1	TNH1 towards Leigang (Xiaxi)
L2; Platforms	Island platform, doors will open on the left
L2; Platforms	Platform 2	TNH1 towards Linyuedong (Kangyi Park)

=== Entrances/exits ===
The station has 4 points of entry/exit. Exits A1 and A2 are equipped with elevators.

- A1: Foping 3rd Road
- A2: Foping 4th Road
- B1: Foping 3rd Road
- B2: Foping 4th Road
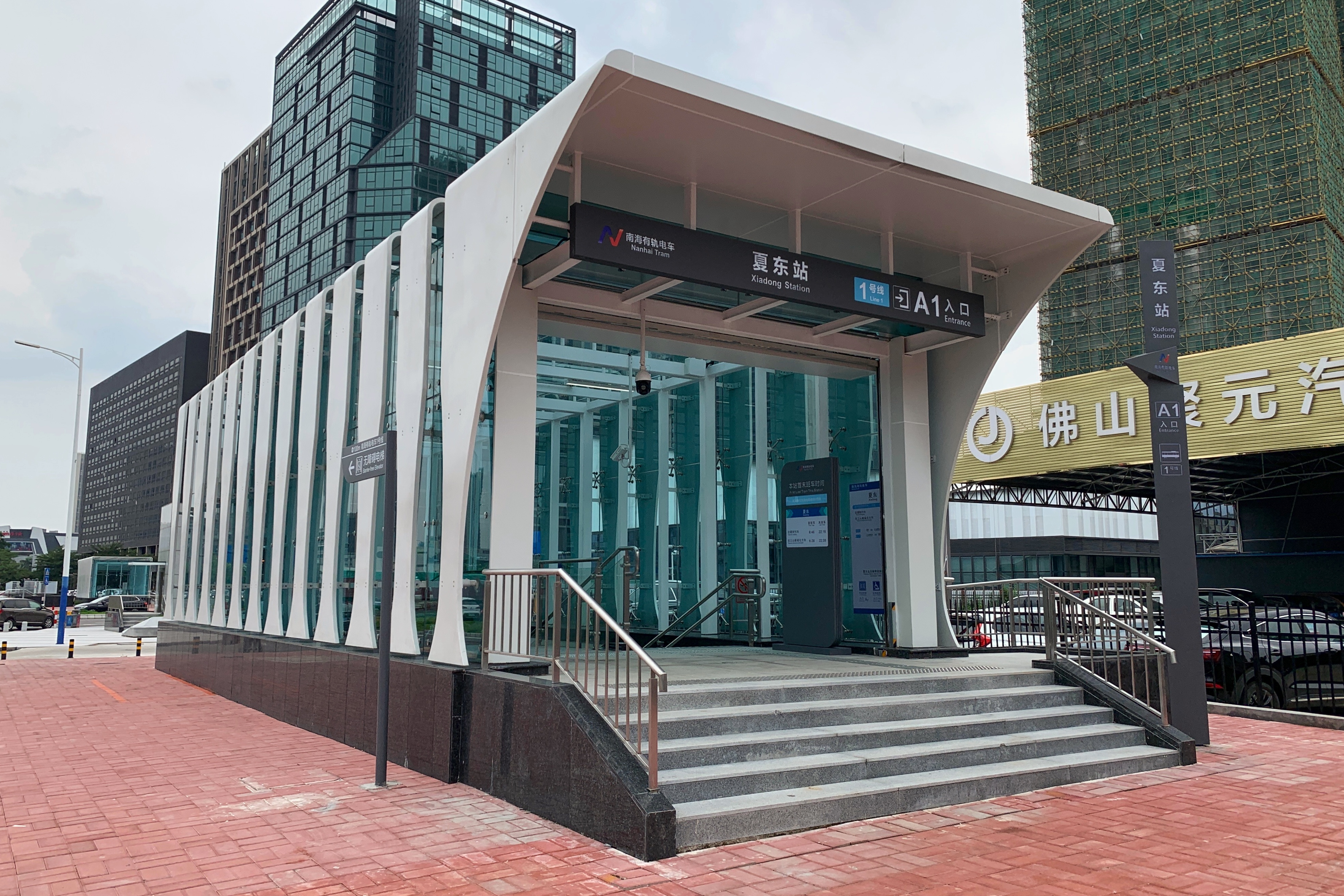
Entrance A1

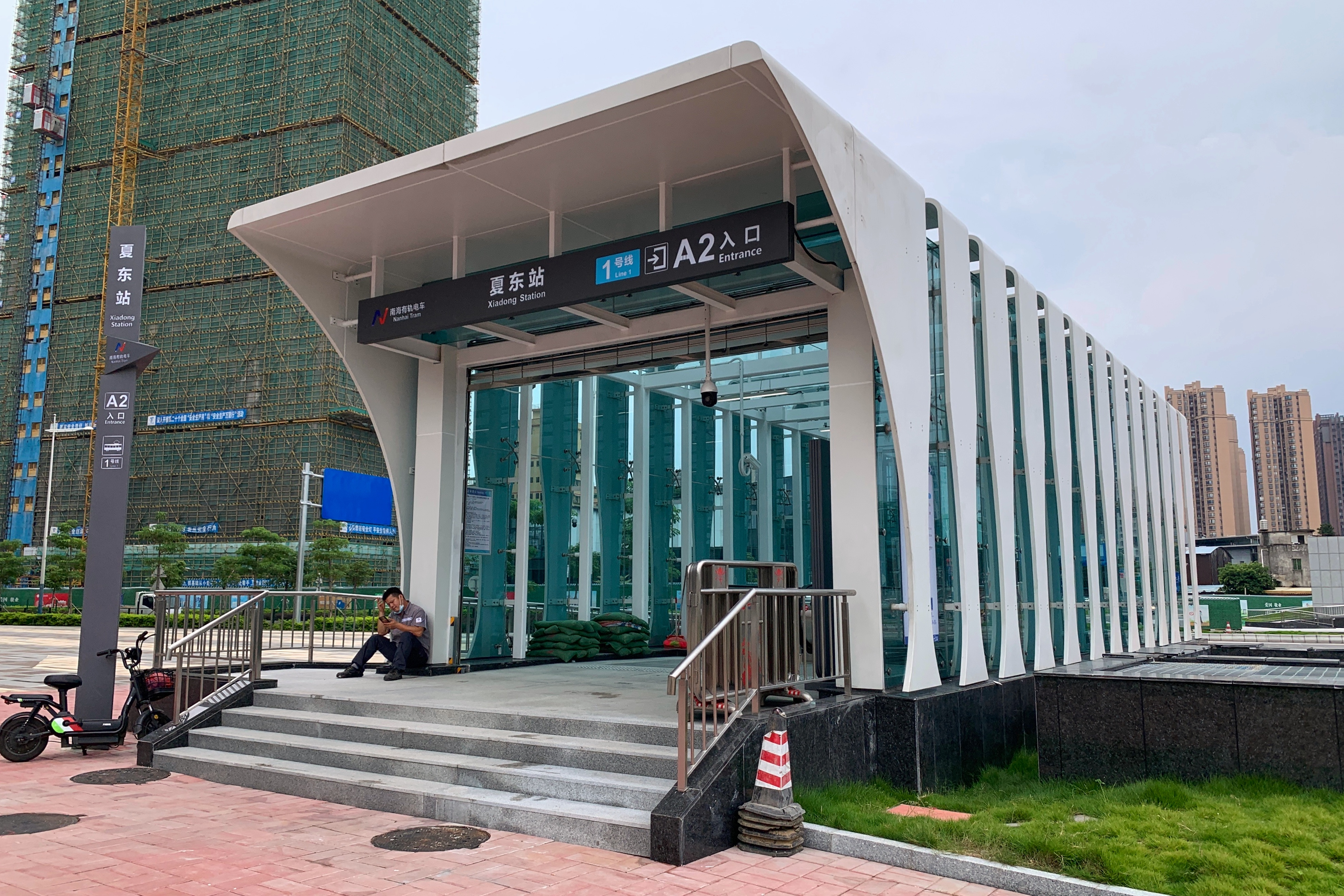
Entrance A2
