= Xiaxi station =

Nanhai Tram Line 1 (Foshan Metro) station

Xiaxi 夏西
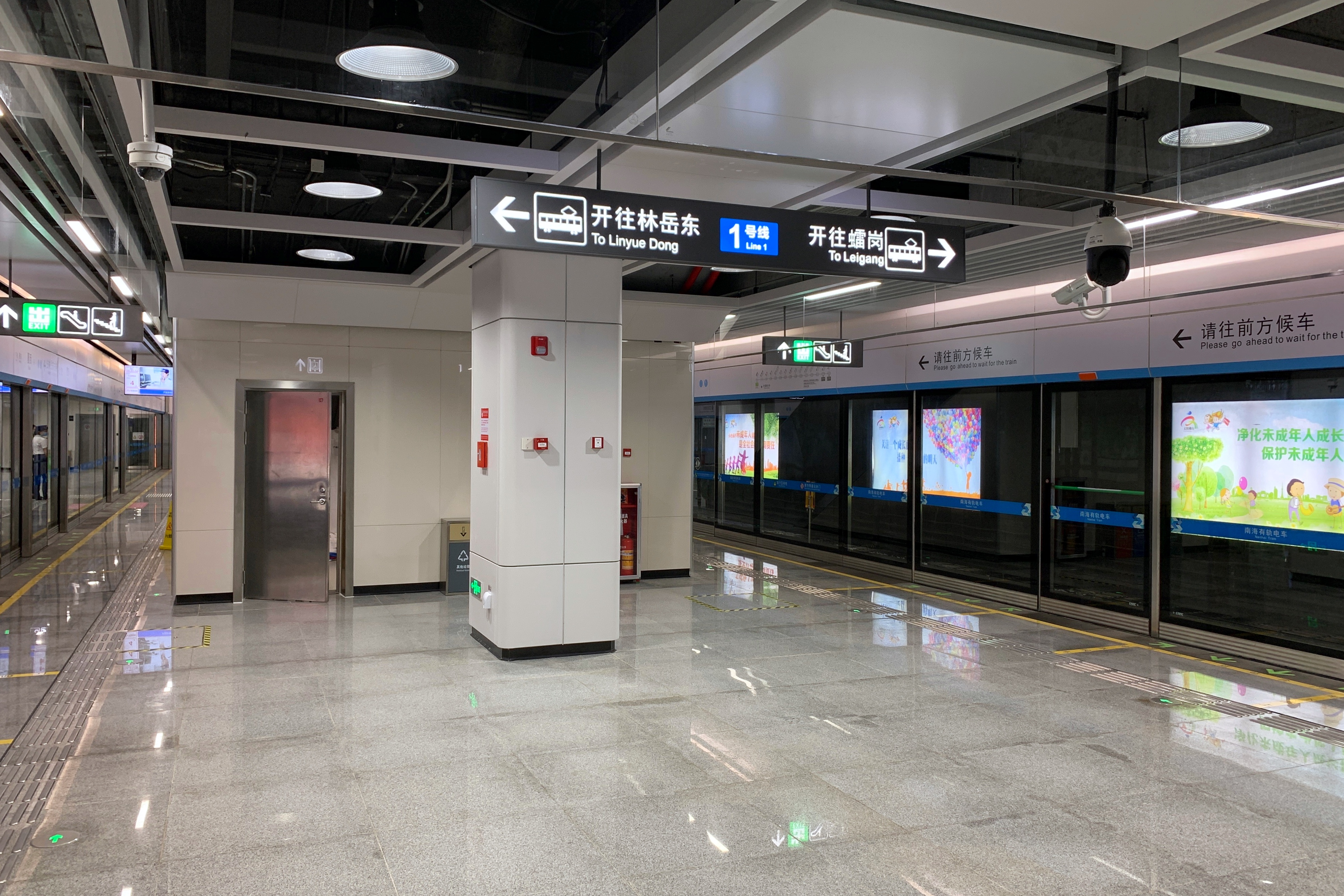
- Platform

Chinese name
- Chinese: 夏西站
Transcriptions
Standard Mandarin
- Hanyu Pinyin: Xiàxī Zhàn
Yue: Cantonese
- Yale Romanization: Hahsāi Jaahm
- Jyutping: Haa^{6}sai^{1} Zaam^{6}

General information
- Location: Outside the intersection of Foping 3rd Road (佛平三路) and Foshan 1st Circular Road (佛山一环路), Guicheng Subdistrict; Nanhai District, Foshan, Guangdong; China
- Coordinates: 23°2′18.64″N 113°9′57.46″E
- Operator: Foshan Metro Operation Co., Ltd.
- Line: Nanhai Tram Line 1
- Platforms: 2 (1 island platform)
- Tracks: 2

Construction
- Structure type: Underground
- Accessible: Yes

Other information
- Station code: TNH103

History
- Opened: 18 August 2021 (4 years ago)
- Former names: Foshan 1st Circular (佛山一环)

Services
Preceding station	Foshan Metro	Following station
Huacuilu towards Leigang	Nanhai Tram Line 1	Xiadong towards Linyuedong
Location

Xiaxi station (Chinese: 夏西站; pinyin: Xiàxī Zhàn; Cantonese Yale: Hahsāi Jaahm}) is a light metro station on Nanhai Tram Line 1 of Foshan Metro, located in Foshan's Nanhai District. It opened on 18 August 2021.

There is a ceramic cultural art wall installation on the concourse, which displays the famous Foshan lion dance, reflecting the history and culture of Nanhai District.

== Station layout ==
The station has an island platform under Foping 3rd Road.

G	-	Exits A & B
L1; Concourse	Lobby	Ticket Machines, Customer Service, Shops, Police Station, Security Facilities
L2; Platforms	Platform 1	TNH1 towards Leigang (Huacuilu)
L2; Platforms	Island platform, doors will open on the left
L2; Platforms	Platform 2	TNH1 towards Linyuedong (Xiadong)

=== Exits ===
The station has 2 points of entry/exit. Exit B is equipped with an elevator.

- A: Foping 3rd Road
- B: Foping 3rd Road
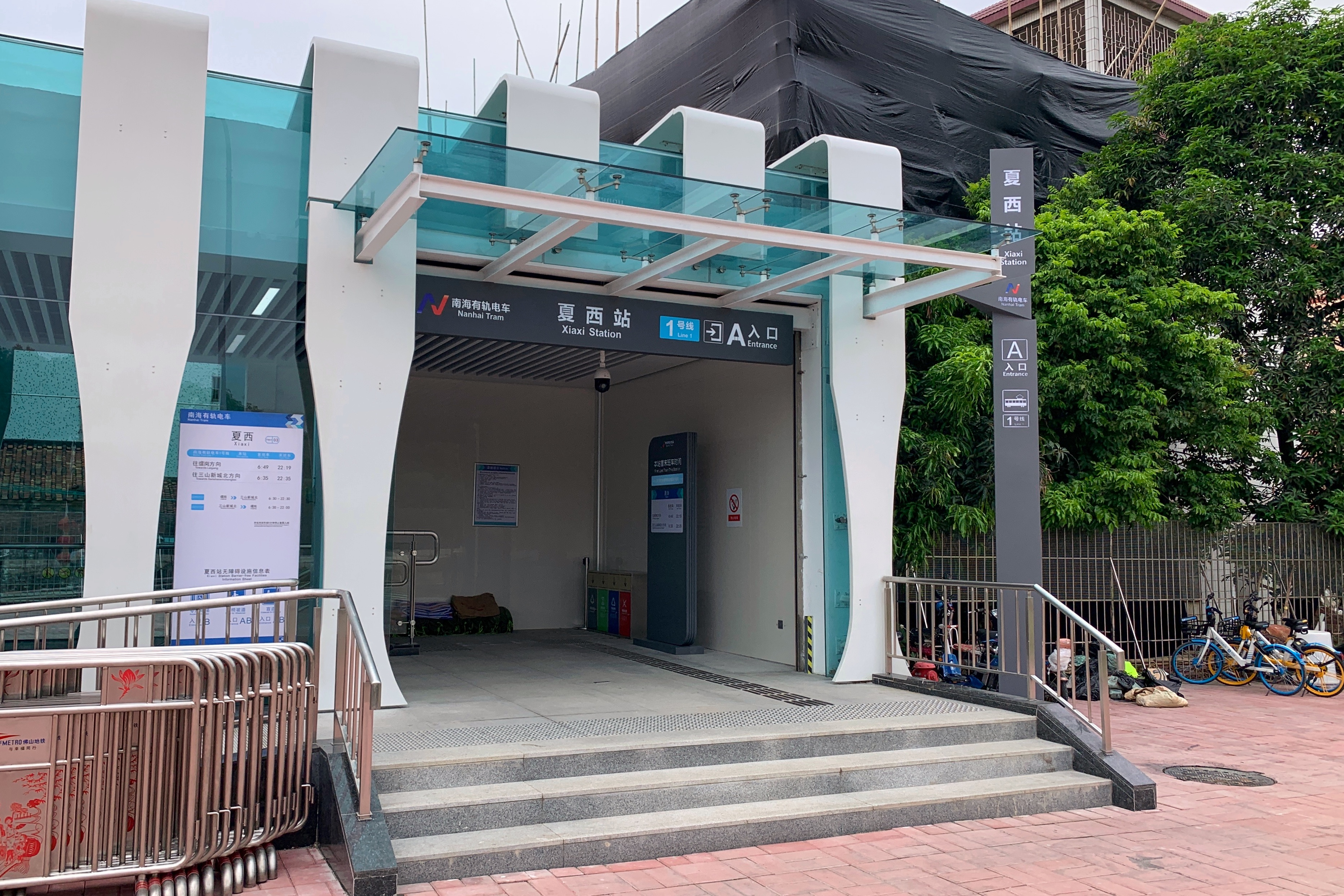
Entrance A

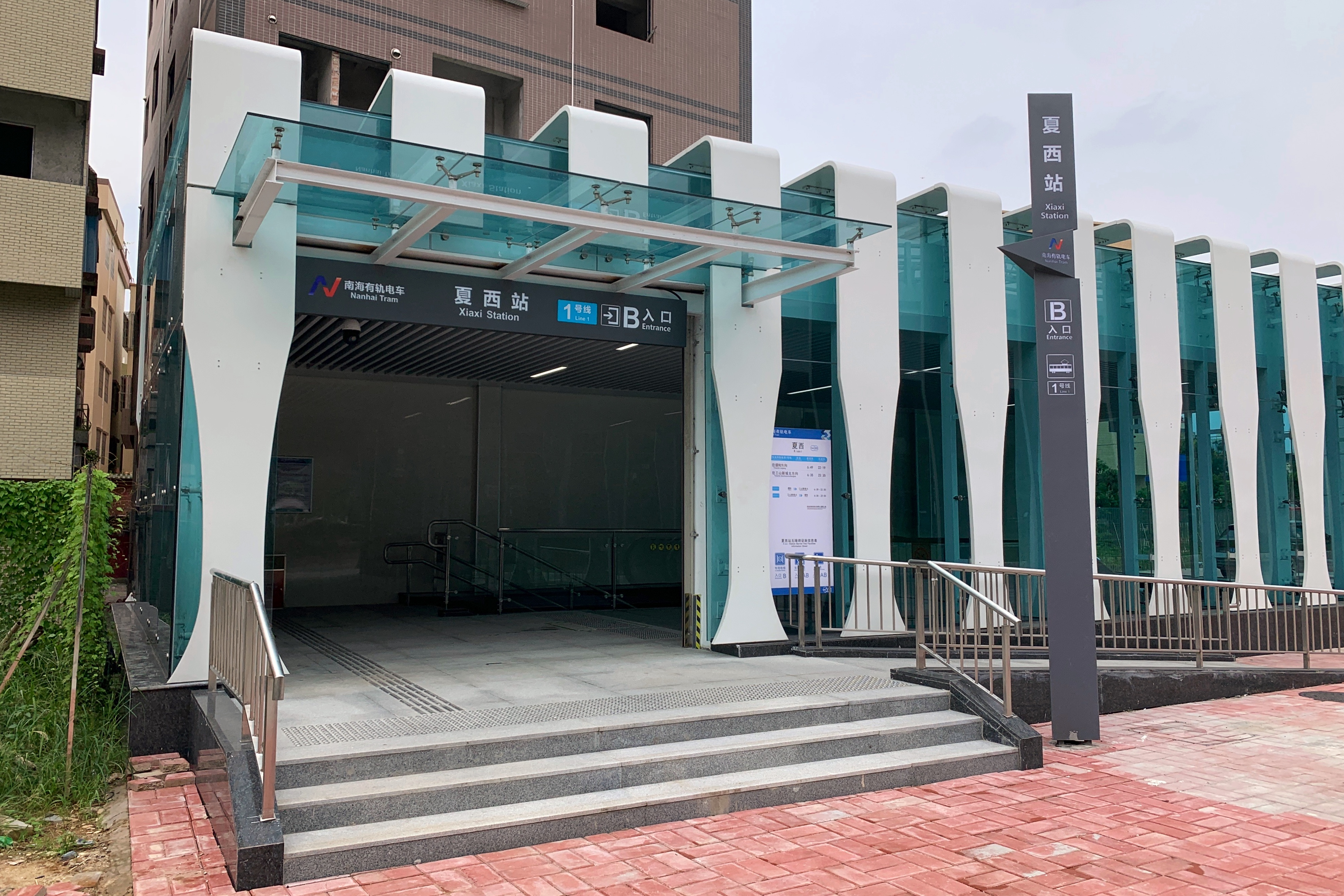
Entrance B

== Gallery ==
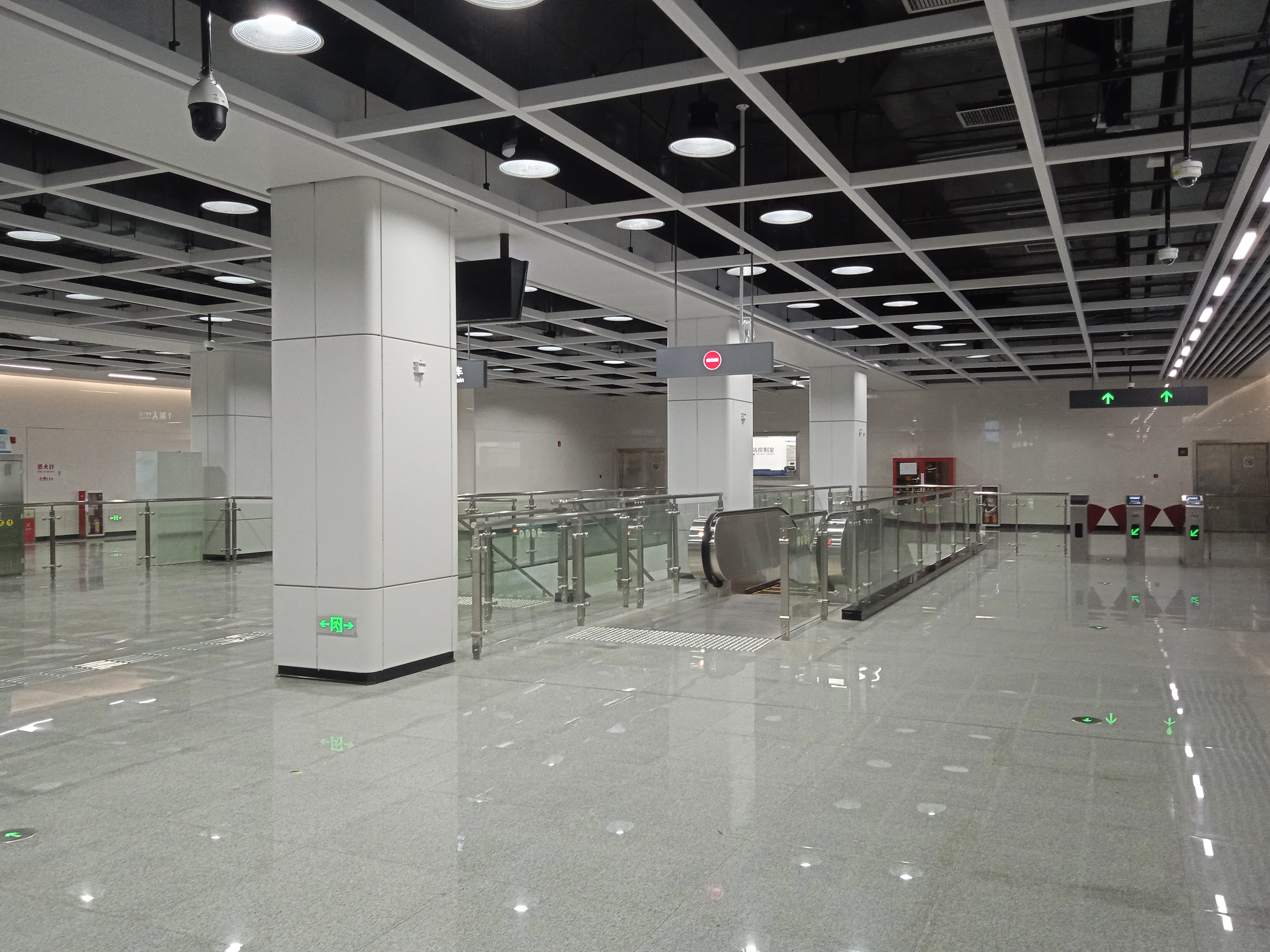
Concourse

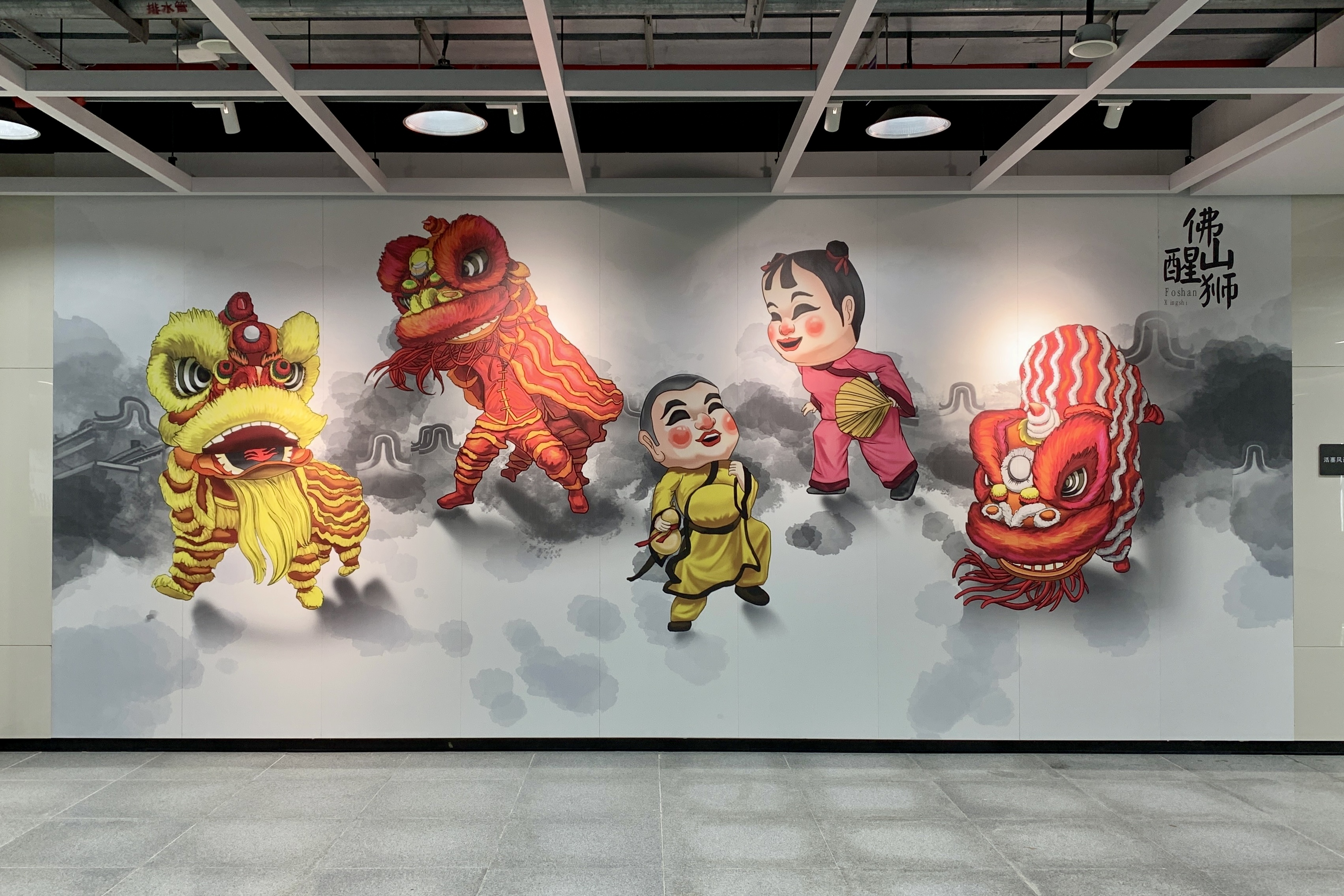
Cultural art wall installation

== History ==
The station completed the construction of the underground diaphragm wall in December 2015.
