= Kangyi Park station =

Nanhai Tram Line 1 (Foshan Metro) station

Kangyi Park 康怡公园
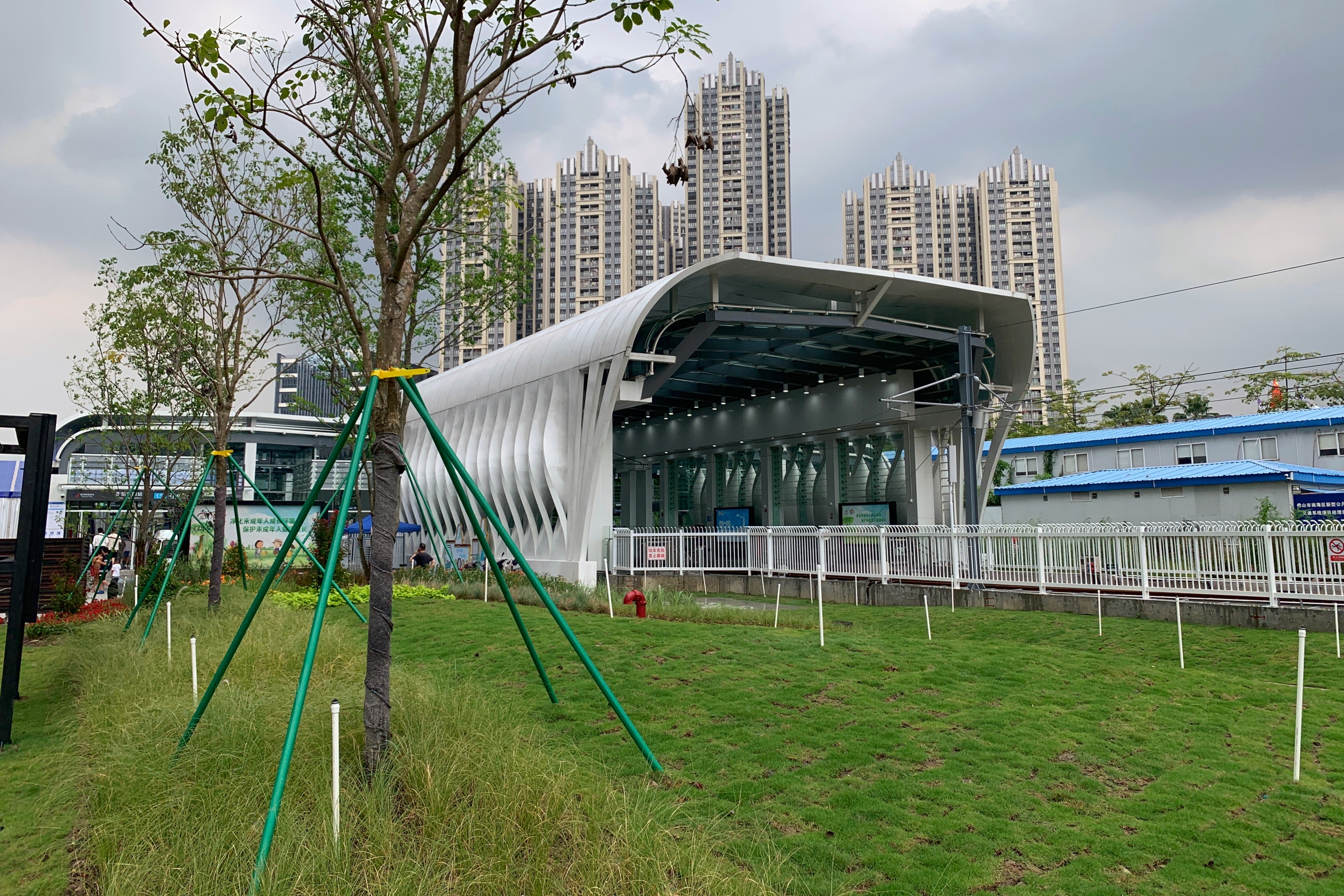
- Exterior

Chinese name
- Simplified Chinese: 康怡公园站
- Traditional Chinese: 康怡公園站
Transcriptions
Standard Mandarin
- Hanyu Pinyin: Kāngyí Gōngyuán Zhàn
Yue: Cantonese
- Yale Romanization: Hōngyìh Gūng'yún Jaahm
- Jyutping: Hong^{1}ji^{4} Gung^{1}jyun^{4} Zaam^{6}

General information
- Location: Kangyi Park, Guicheng Subdistrict; Nanhai District, Foshan, Guangdong; China
- Coordinates: 23°2′8.95″N 113°11′4.49″E
- Operator: Foshan Metro Operation Co., Ltd.
- Line: Nanhai Tram Line 1
- Platforms: 2 (2 side platforms)
- Tracks: 2

Construction
- Structure type: At-grade
- Accessible: Yes

Other information
- Station code: TNH105

History
- Opened: 18 August 2021 (4 years ago)

Services
Preceding station	Foshan Metro	Following station
Xiadong towards Leigang	Nanhai Tram Line 1	Pingxi towards Linyuedong
Location

Kangyi Park station (simplified Chinese: 康怡公园站; traditional Chinese: 康怡公園站; pinyin: Kāngyí Gōngyuán Zhàn; Cantonese Yale: Hōngyìh Gūng'yún Jaahm) is a light metro station on Nanhai Tram Line 1 of Foshan Metro, located in Foshan's Nanhai District. It opened on 18 August 2021.

There is a ceramic cultural art wall installation on the concourse, which shows the scene of dragon boat racing.

== Station layout ==
The station has two side platforms at Kangyi Park.

G Concourse & Platforms	North Lobby	Ticket Machines, Customer Service, Security Facilities
G Concourse & Platforms	Side platform, doors will open on the right
G Concourse & Platforms	Platform 1	TNH1 towards Leigang (Xiadong)
G Concourse & Platforms	Platform 2	TNH1 towards Linyuedong (Pingxi)
G Concourse & Platforms	Side platform, doors will open on the right
G Concourse & Platforms	South Lobby	Ticket Machines, Customer Service, Security Facilities
L1	Connecting passageway	Paid passage between platforms, Toilets

=== Entrances/exits ===
The station has 4 points of entry/exit, split between Exit A at the south concourse and Exit B at the north concourse. All exits are equipped with ramps.

==== South concourse ====
- A1: Park Road
- A2: Park Road

==== North concourse ====
- B1: Foping 4th Road, Kangyi Park
- B2: Foping 4th Road, Kangyi Park
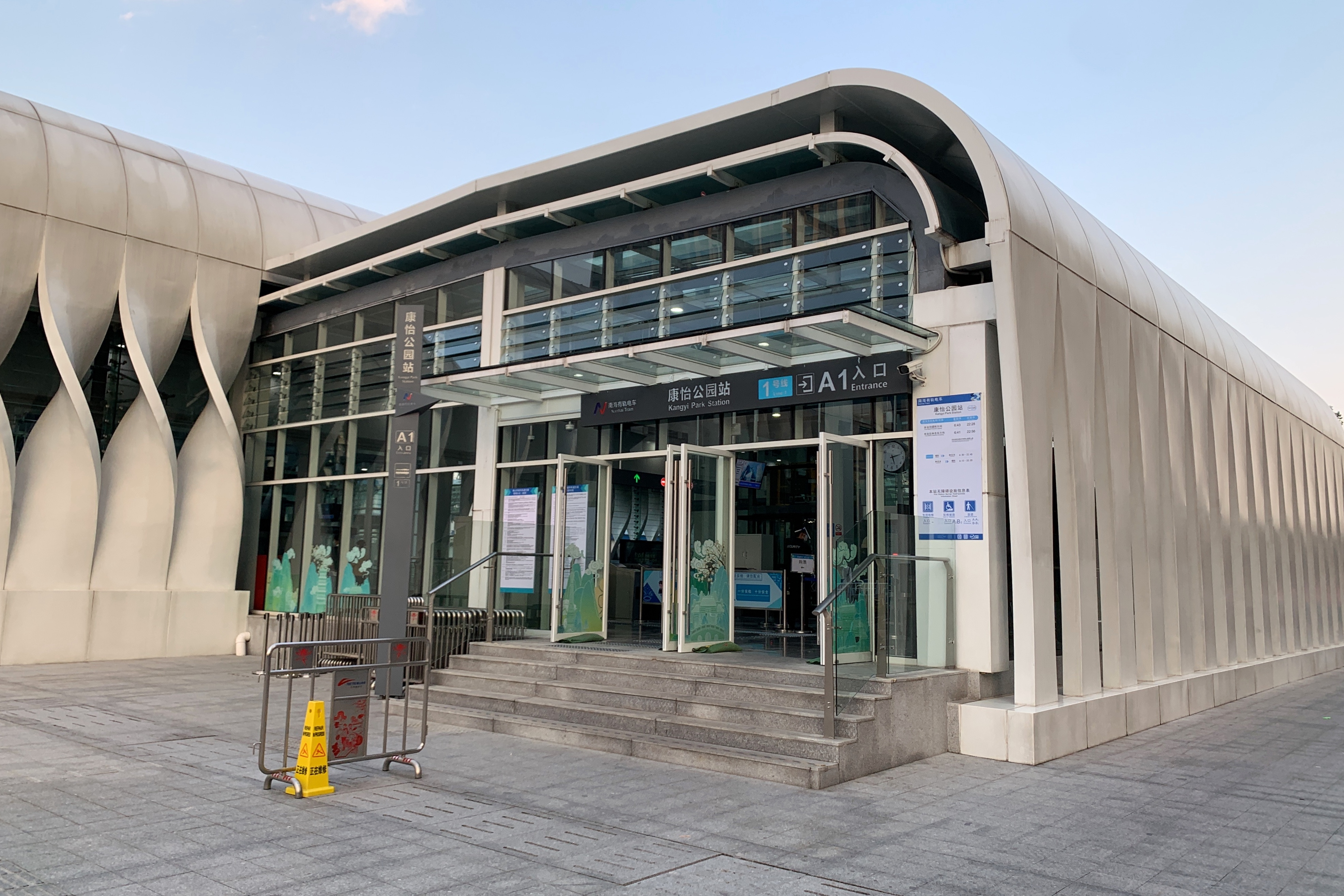
Entrance A1

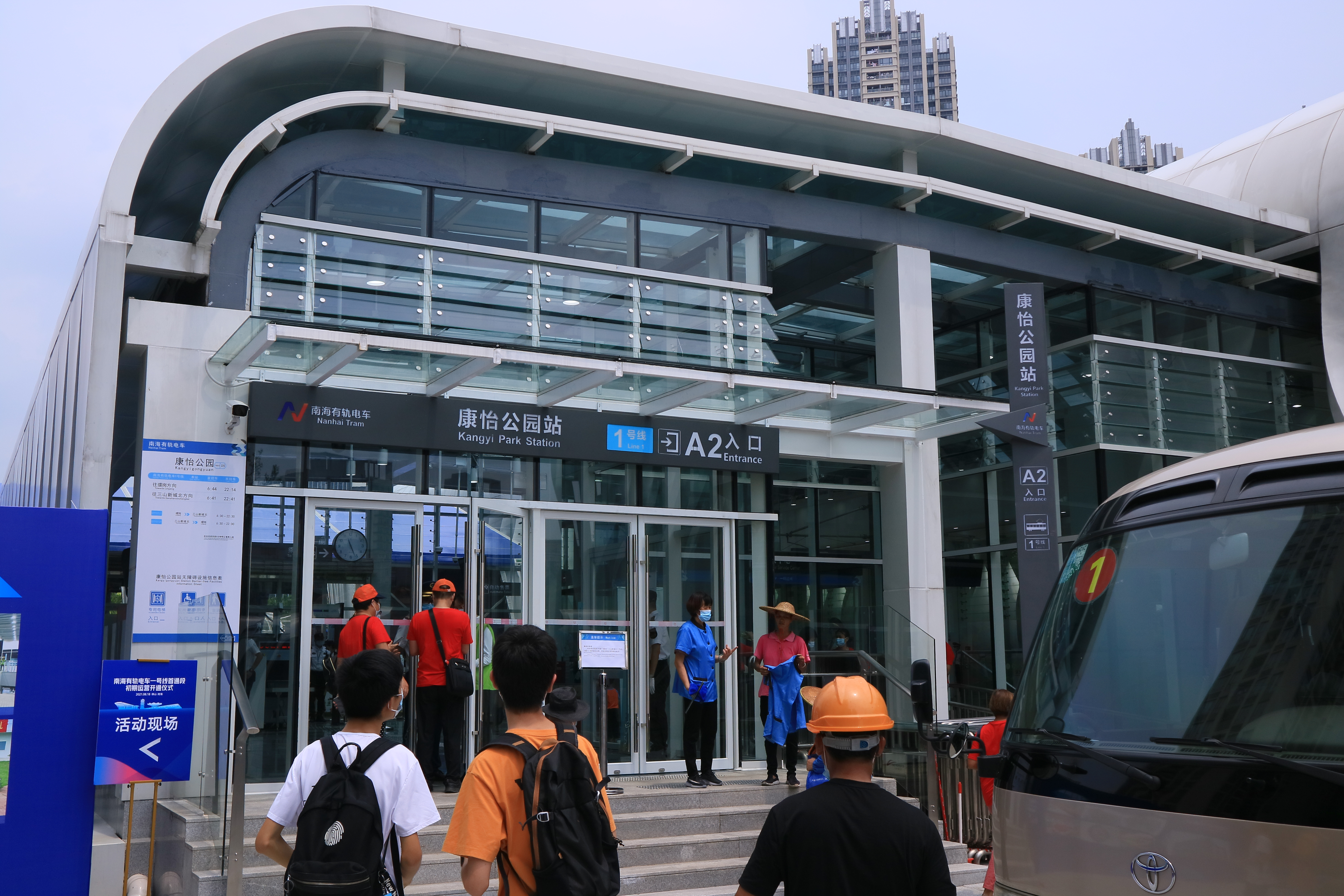
Entrance A2

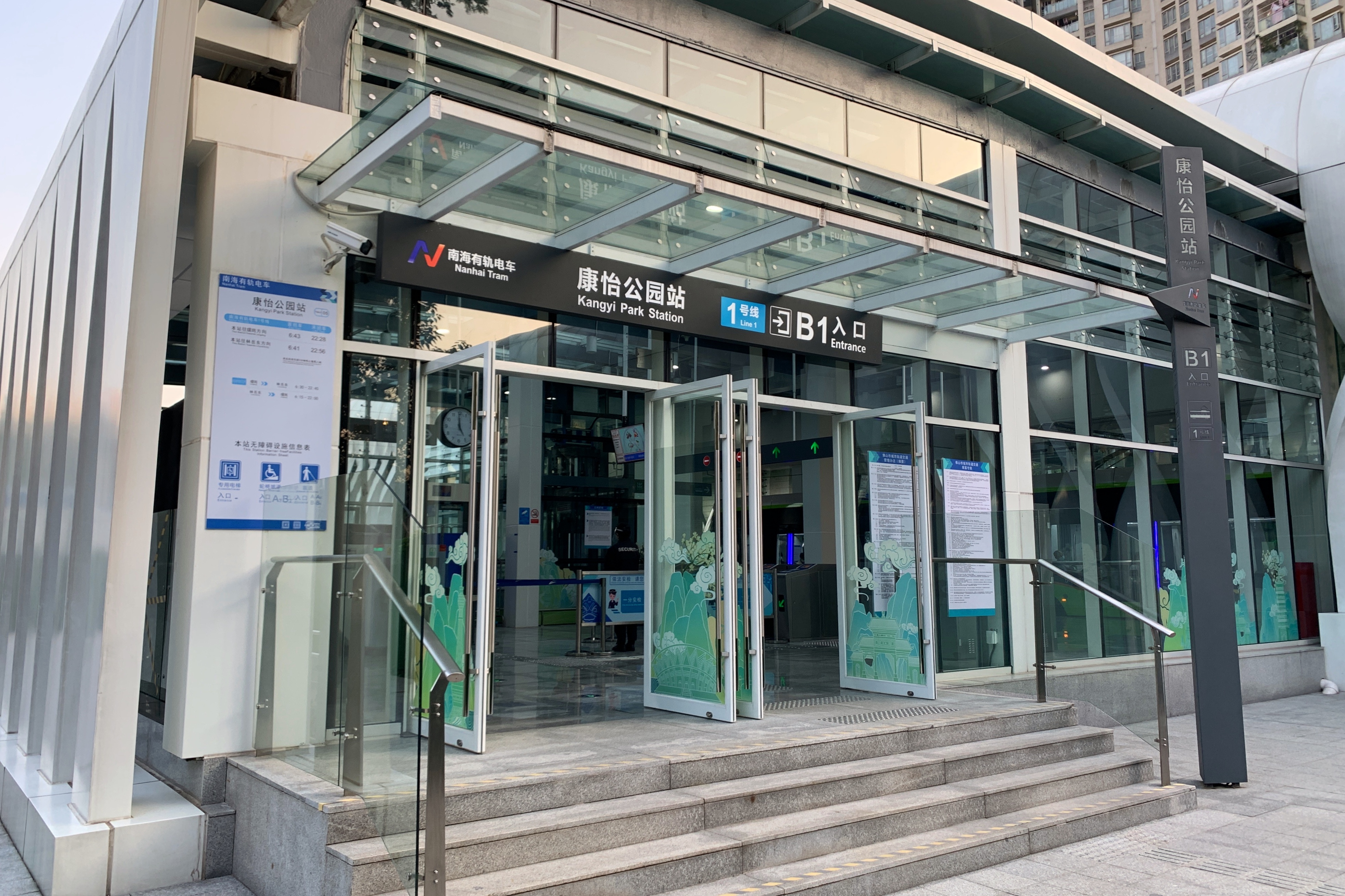
Entrance B1

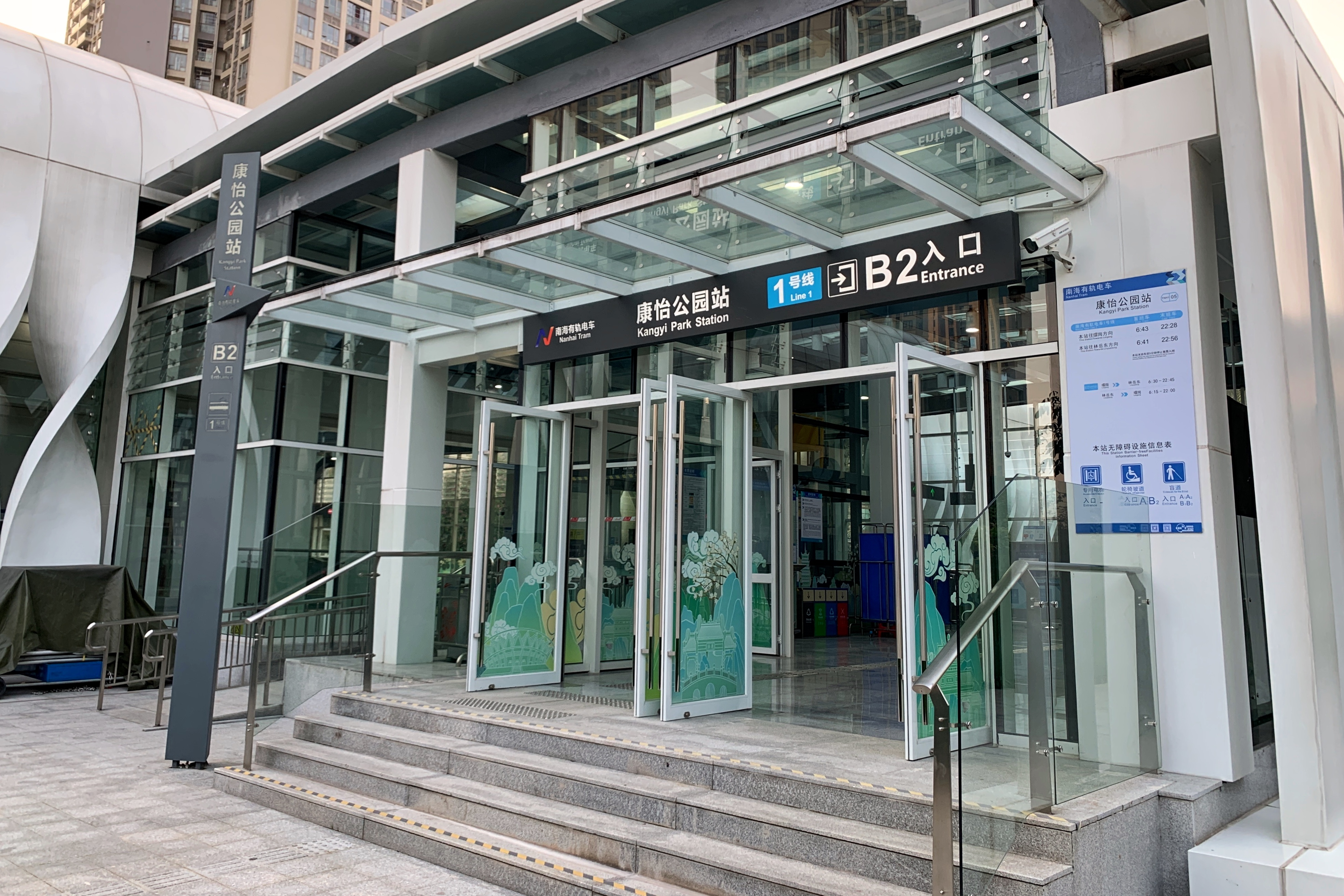
Entrance B2
