= Pingxi station =

Pingxi station may refers to:

- Pingxi railway station (平溪車站), a railway station in New Taipei, Taiwan.
- Pingxi station (Nanhai Tram Line 1) (平西站), a tram station in Foshan, Guangdong, China.
- Pingxi station (Shenzhen Metro) (坪西站), a metro station in Shenzhen, Guangdong, China.
