= Pingxi station (Nanhai Tram Line 1) =

Nanhai Tram Line 1 (Foshan Metro) station

Pingxi 平西
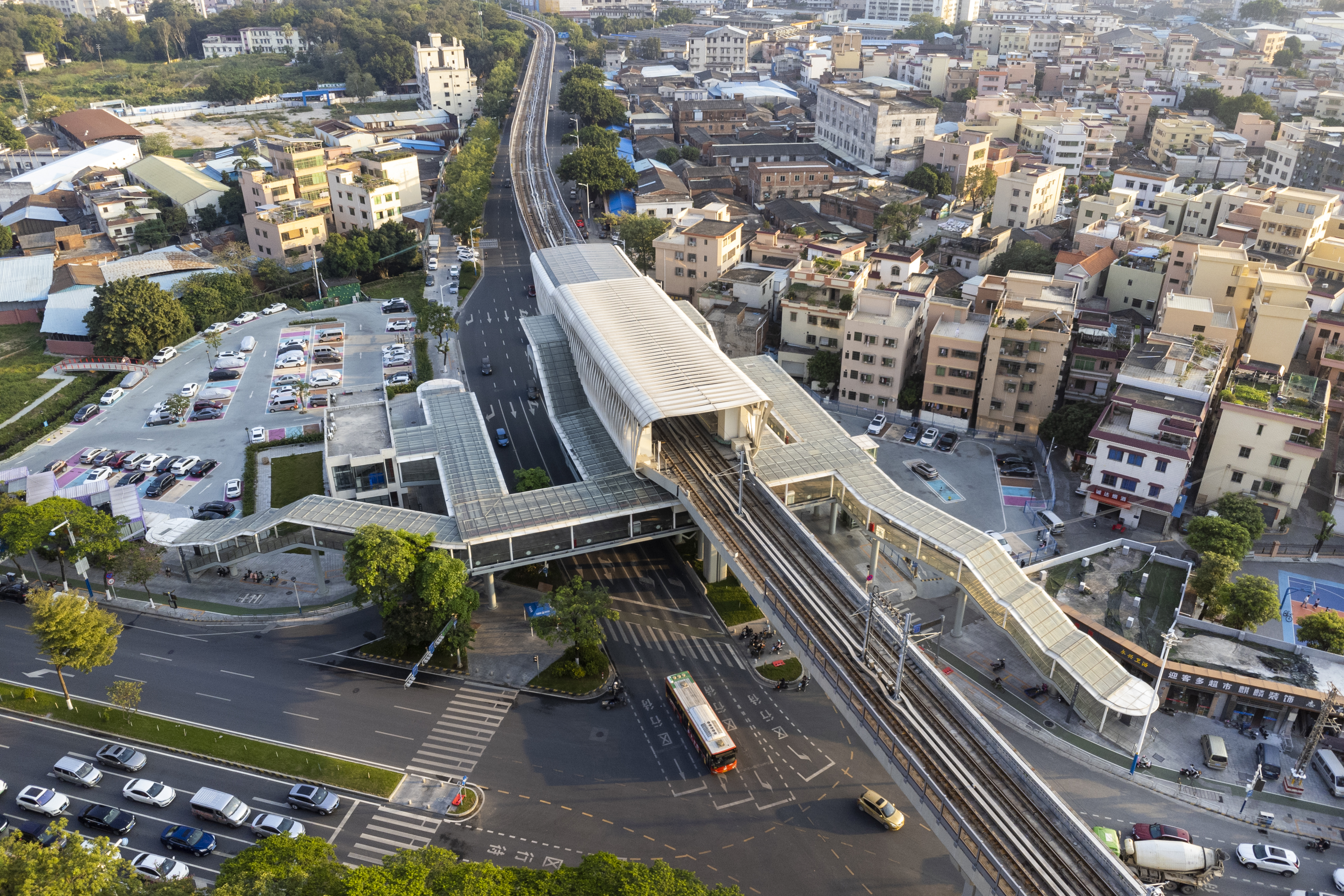
- Exterior

Chinese name
- Chinese: 平西站
Transcriptions
Standard Mandarin
- Hanyu Pinyin: Píng Xī Zhàn
Yue: Cantonese
- Yale Romanization: Pìngsāi Jaahm
- Jyutping: Ping^{4}sai^{1} Zaam^{6}

General information
- Location: Intersection of Foping 5th Road (佛平五路) and Guiping East Road (桂平东路), Guicheng Subdistrict; Nanhai District, Foshan, Guangdong; China
- Coordinates: 23°1′50.74″N 113°11′25.87″E
- Operator: Foshan Metro Operation Co., Ltd.
- Line: Nanhai Tram Line 1
- Platforms: 2 (2 side platforms)
- Tracks: 2

Construction
- Structure type: Elevated
- Accessible: Yes

Other information
- Station code: TNH106

History
- Opened: 18 August 2021 (4 years ago)
- Former names: Xingren Road (兴仁路)

Services
Preceding station	Foshan Metro	Following station
Kangyi Park towards Leigang	Nanhai Tram Line 1	Pingnan towards Linyuedong
Location

Pingxi station (Chinese: 平西站; pinyin: Píng Xī Zhàn; Cantonese Yale: Pìngsāi Jaahm) is a light metro station on Nanhai Tram Line 1 of Foshan Metro, located in Foshan's Nanhai District. It opened on 18 August 2021.

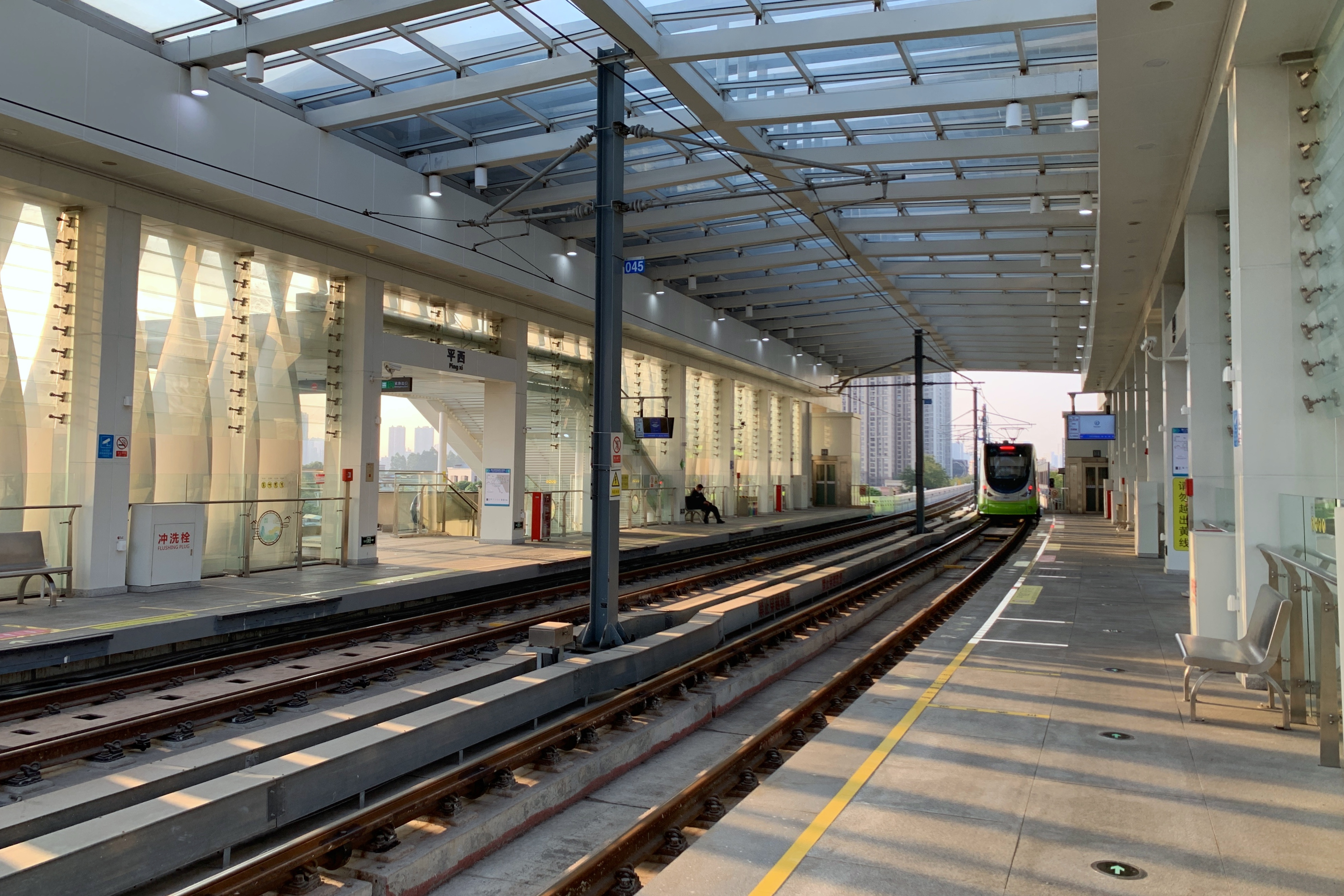
Platform

== Station layout ==
The station has two side platforms above Foping 5th Road.

F3; Platforms	Side platform, doors will open on the right
F3; Platforms	Platform 1	TNH1 towards Leigang (Kangyi Park)
F3; Platforms	Platform 2	TNH1 towards Linyuedong (Pingnan)
F3; Platforms	Side platform, doors will open on the right
F2; Concourse	Lobby	Ticket Machines, Customer Service, Police Station, Security Facilities
G	-	Exits A-E

=== Entrances/exits ===
The station has 5 points of entry/exit. Exits C, D and E are equipped with elevators.

- A: Foping 5th Road
- B: Foping 5th Road
- C: Foping 5th Road
- D: Foping 5th Road
- E: Foping 5th Road
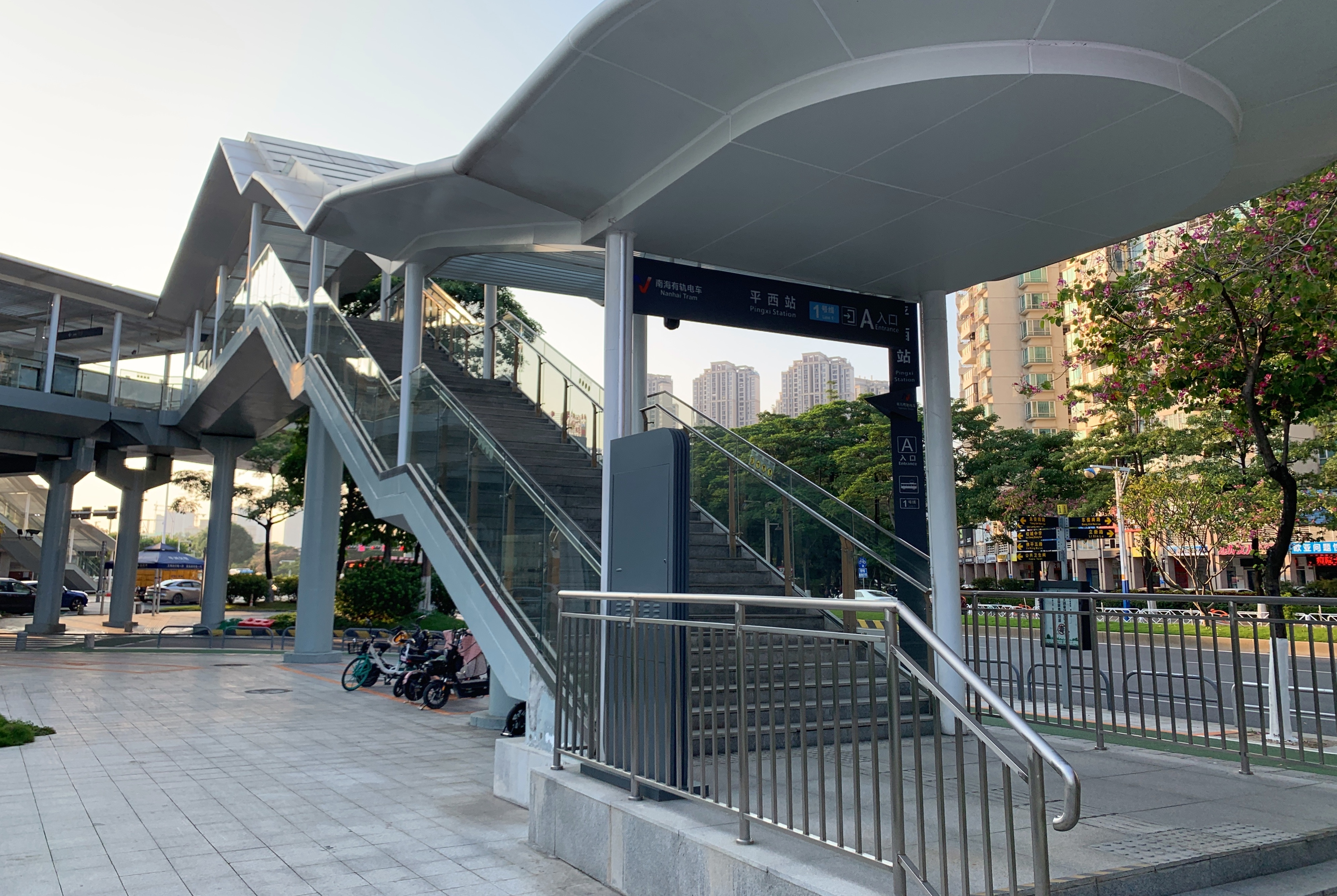
Entrance A

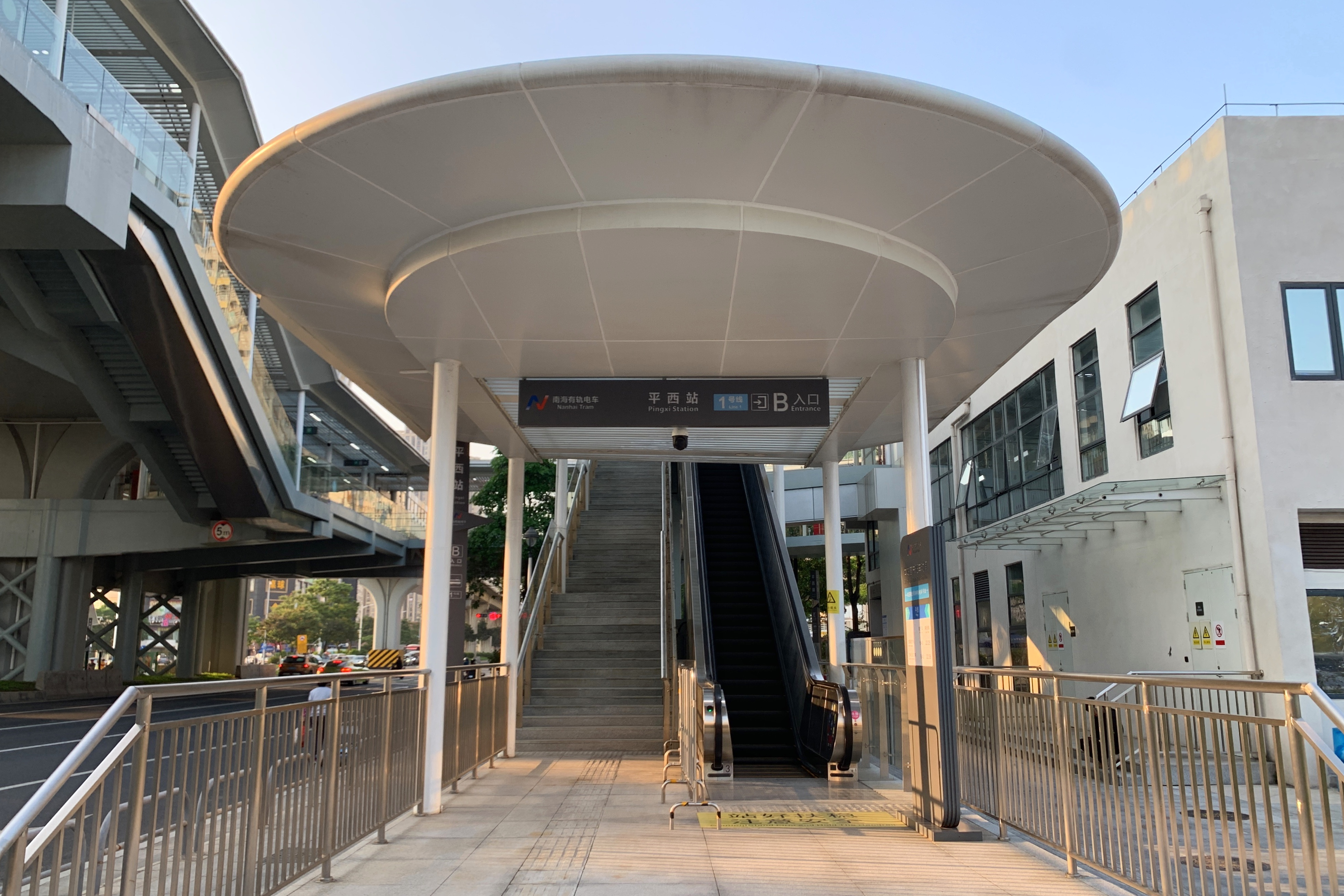
Entrance B

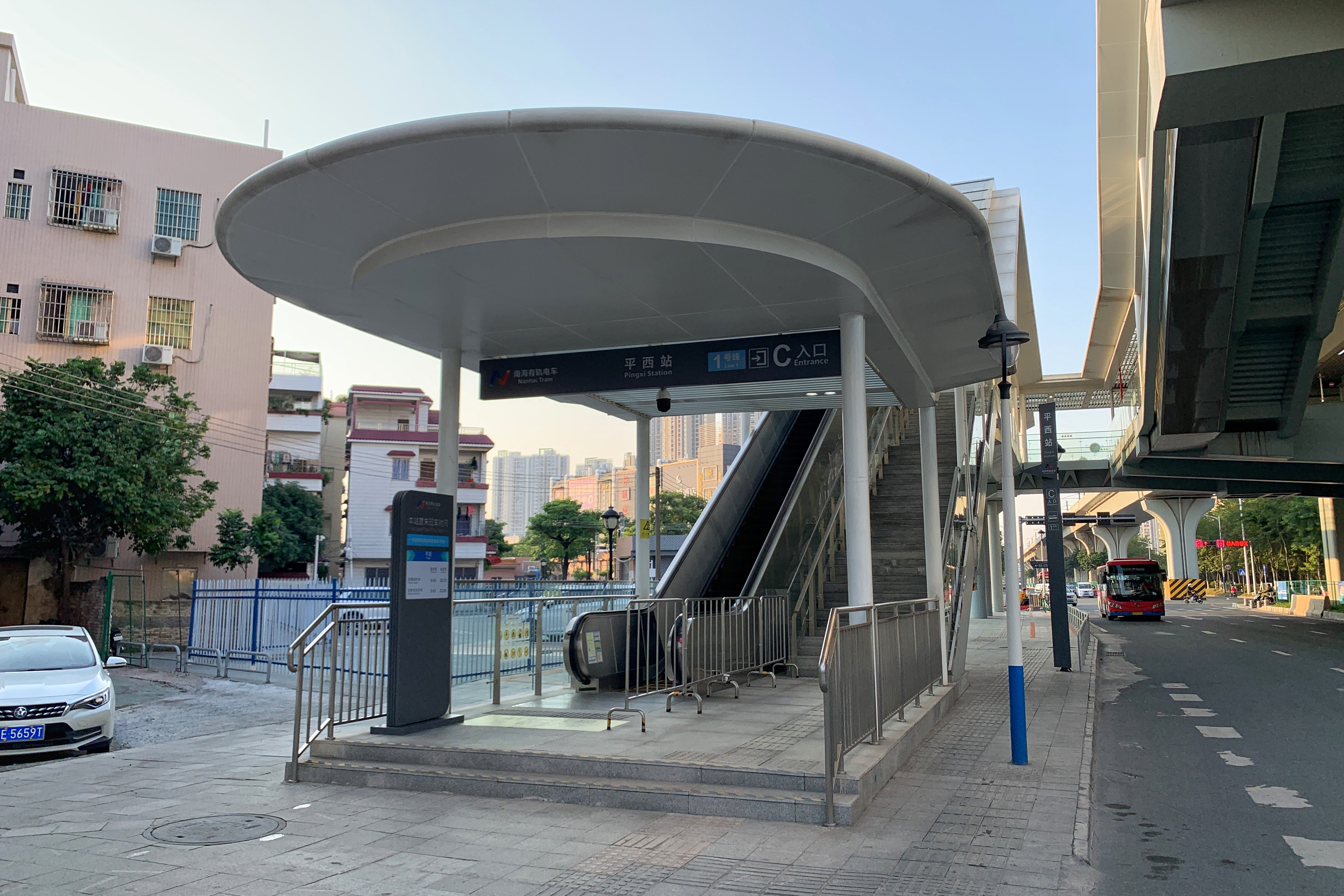
Entrance C

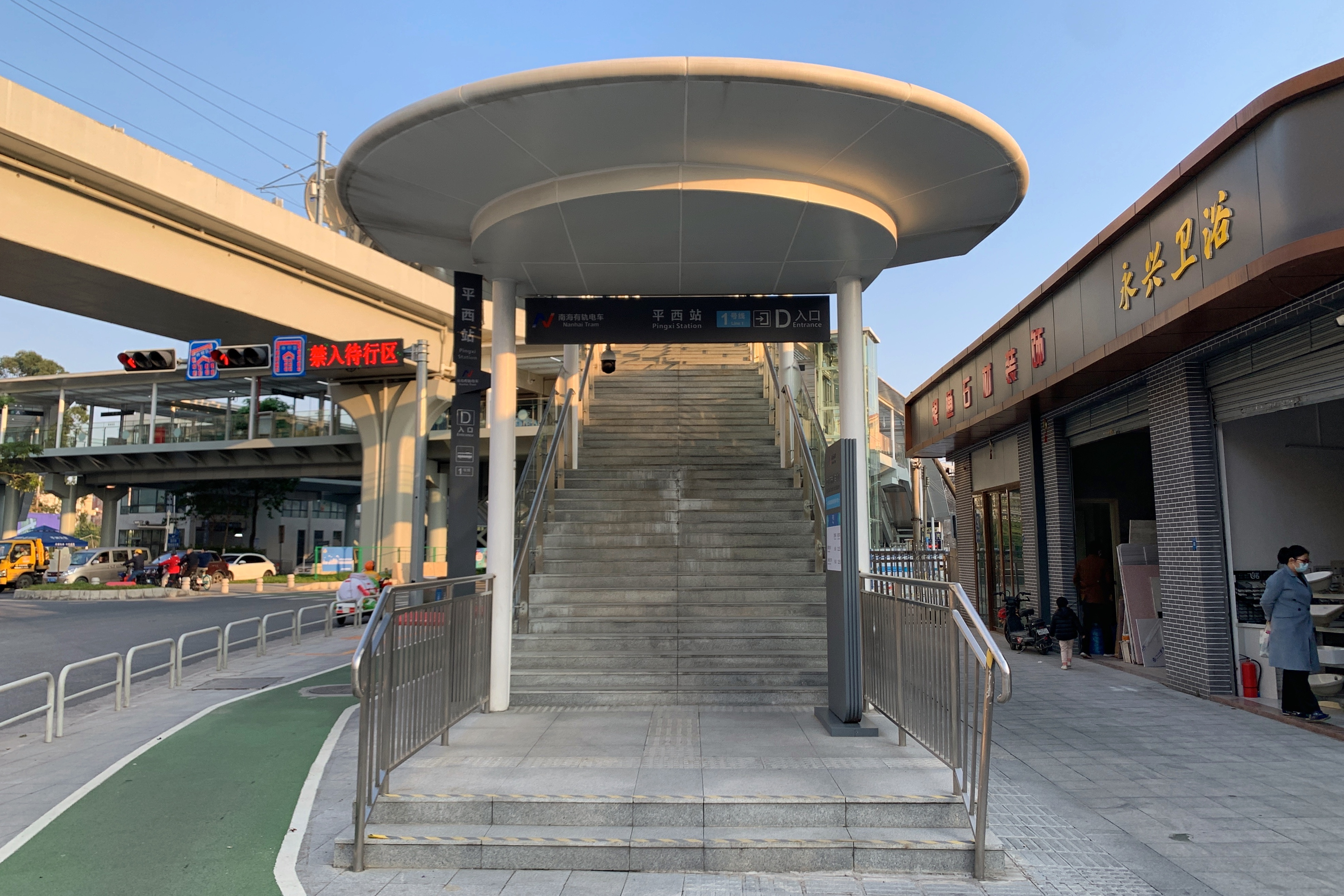
Entrance D

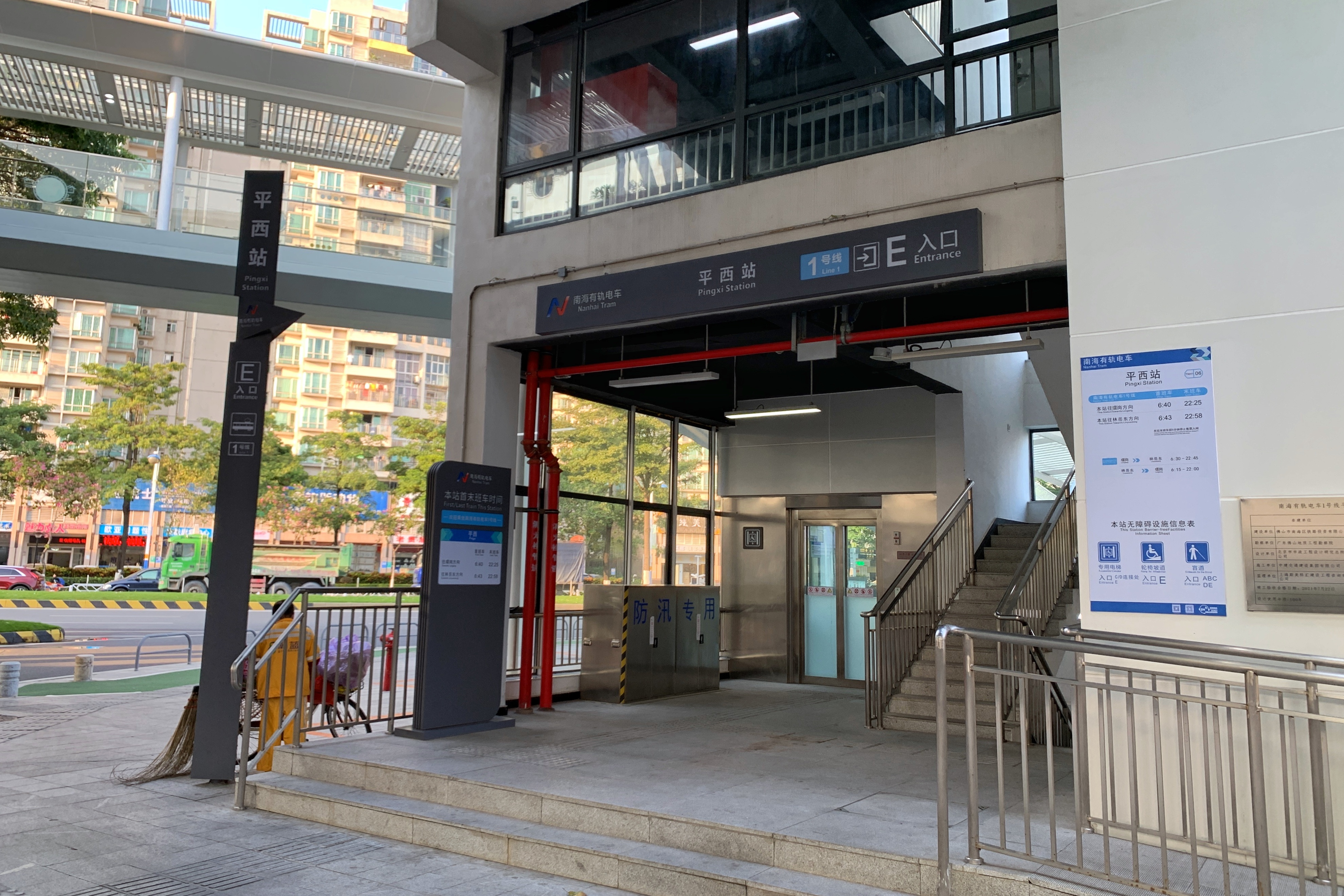
Entrance E
