= Huacuilu station =

Nanhai Tram Line 1 (Foshan Metro) station

Huacuilu 华翠路
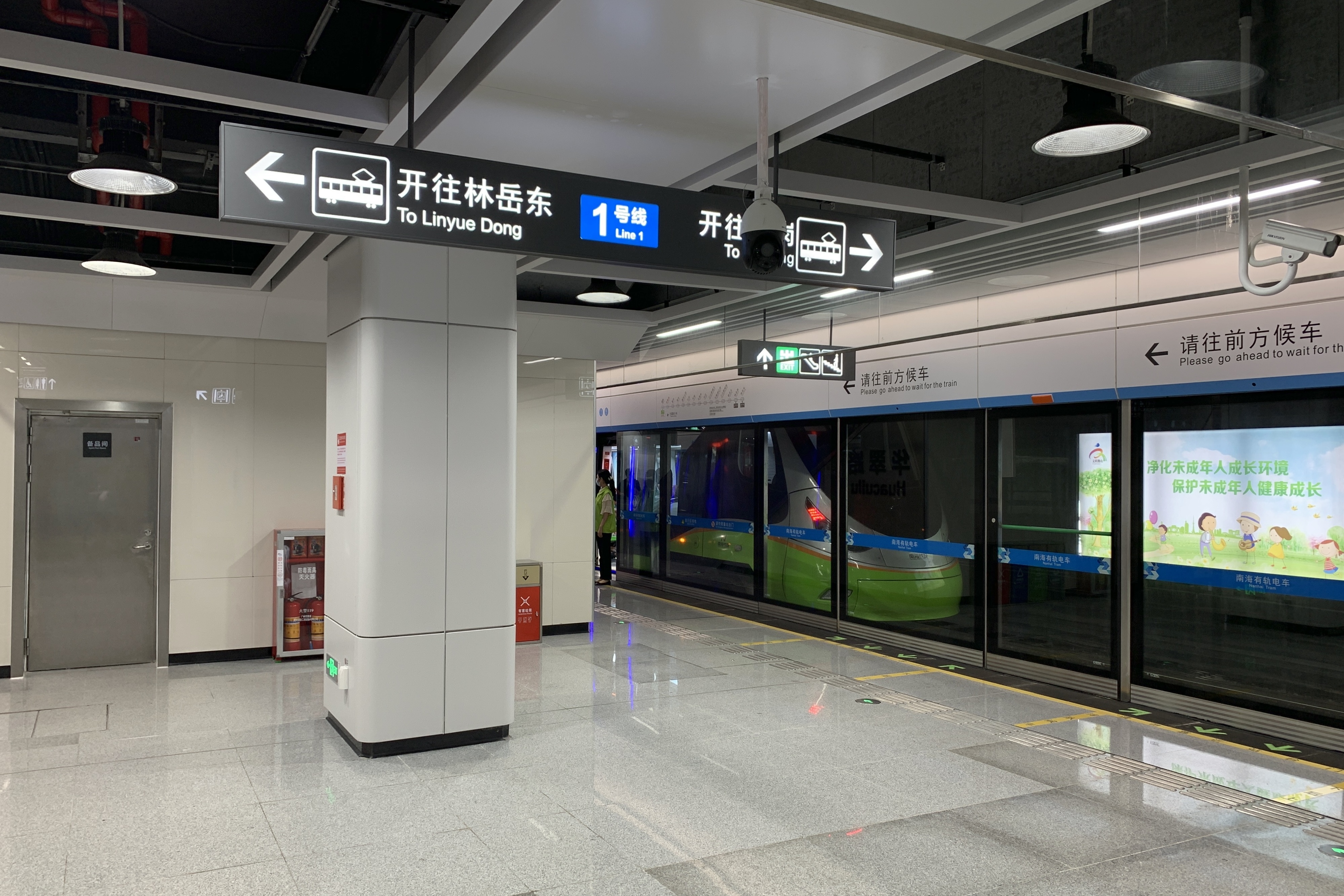
- Platform

Chinese name
- Simplified Chinese: 华翠路站
- Traditional Chinese: 華翠路站
Transcriptions
Standard Mandarin
- Hanyu Pinyin: Huácuì Lù Zhàn
Yue: Cantonese
- Yale Romanization: Huáchuei Lǒu Jaahm
- Jyutping: Waa^{6}ceoi^{3} Lou^{6} Zaam^{6}

General information
- Location: Outside the fork of Huacui North Road (华翠北路), Huacui South Road (华翠南路) and Foping 3rd Road (佛平三路), Guicheng Subdistrict; Nanhai District, Foshan, Guangdong; China
- Coordinates: 23°2′22.63″N 113°9′31.68″E
- Operator: Foshan Metro Operation Co., Ltd.
- Line: Nanhai Tram Line 1
- Platforms: 2 (1 island platform)
- Tracks: 2

Construction
- Structure type: Underground
- Accessible: Yes

Other information
- Station code: TNH102

History
- Opened: 18 August 2021 (4 years ago)

Services
Preceding station	Foshan Metro	Following station
Leigang Terminus	Nanhai Tram Line 1	Xiaxi towards Linyuedong
Location

Huacuilu station (simplified Chinese: 华翠路站; traditional Chinese: 華翠路站; pinyin: Huácuì Lù Zhàn; Cantonese Yale: Huáchuei Lǒu Jaahm) is a light metro station on Nanhai Tram Line 1 of Foshan Metro, located in Foshan's Nanhai District. It opened on 18 August 2021.

There is a ceramic cultural art wall installation on the concourse, which displays modern historical and cultural celebrities such as Zhu Ciqi, Kang Youwei and Wong Fei-hung, reflecting the history and culture of Nanhai District.

== Station layout ==
The station has an island platform under Foping 3rd Road.

G	-	Exits A & B
L1; Concourse	Lobby	Ticket Machines, Customer Service, Shops, Police Station, Security Facilities
L2; Platforms	Platform 1	TNH1 towards Leigang (terminus)
L2; Platforms	Island platform, doors will open on the left
L2; Platforms	Platform 2	TNH1 towards Linyuedong (Xiaxi)

=== Entrances/exits ===
The station has 4 points of entry/exit. Exit B2 is equipped with an elevator.

- A1, A2: Foping 3rd Road
- B1: Foping 3rd Road
- B2: Foping 3rd Road
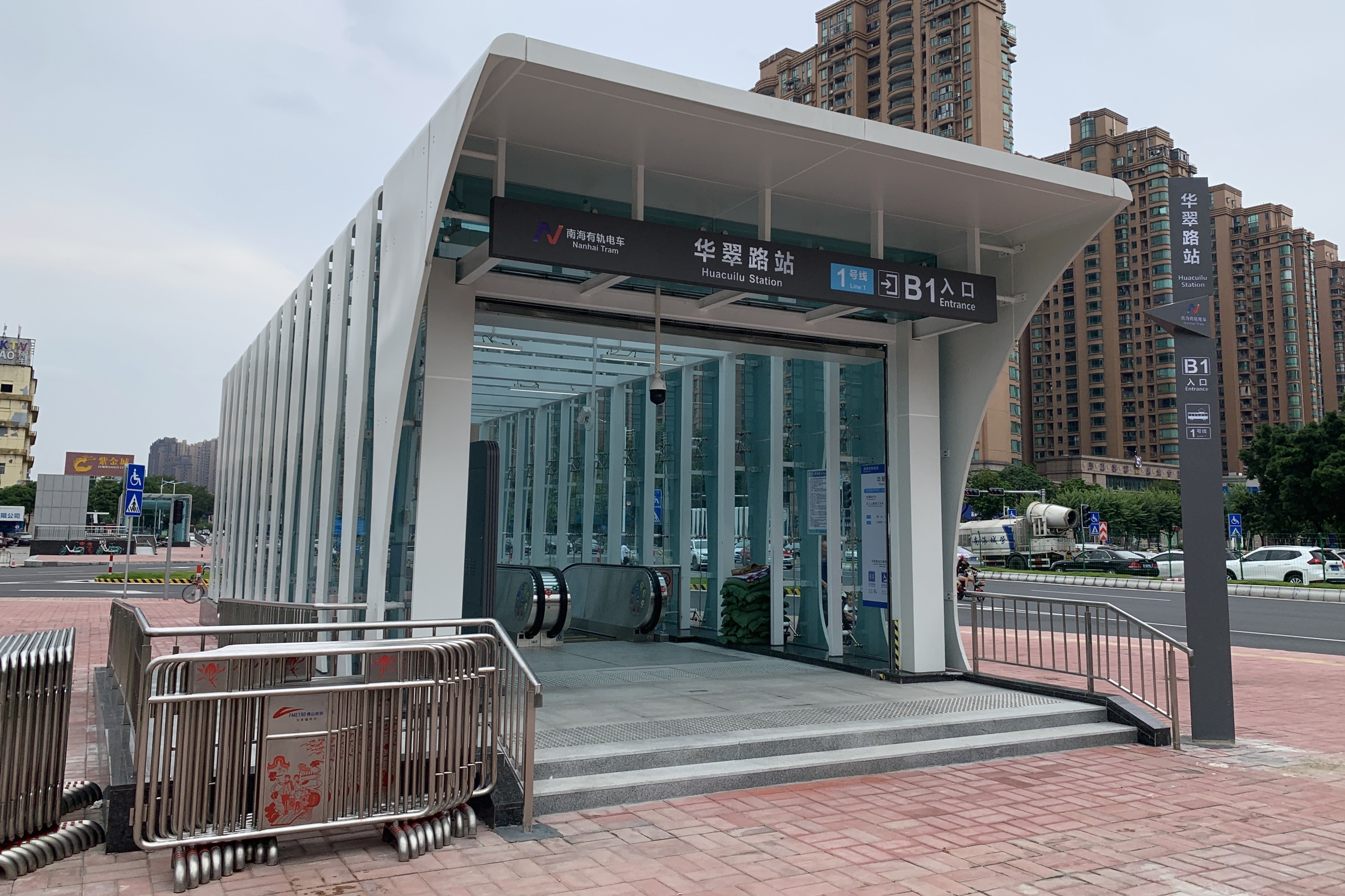
Entrance B1

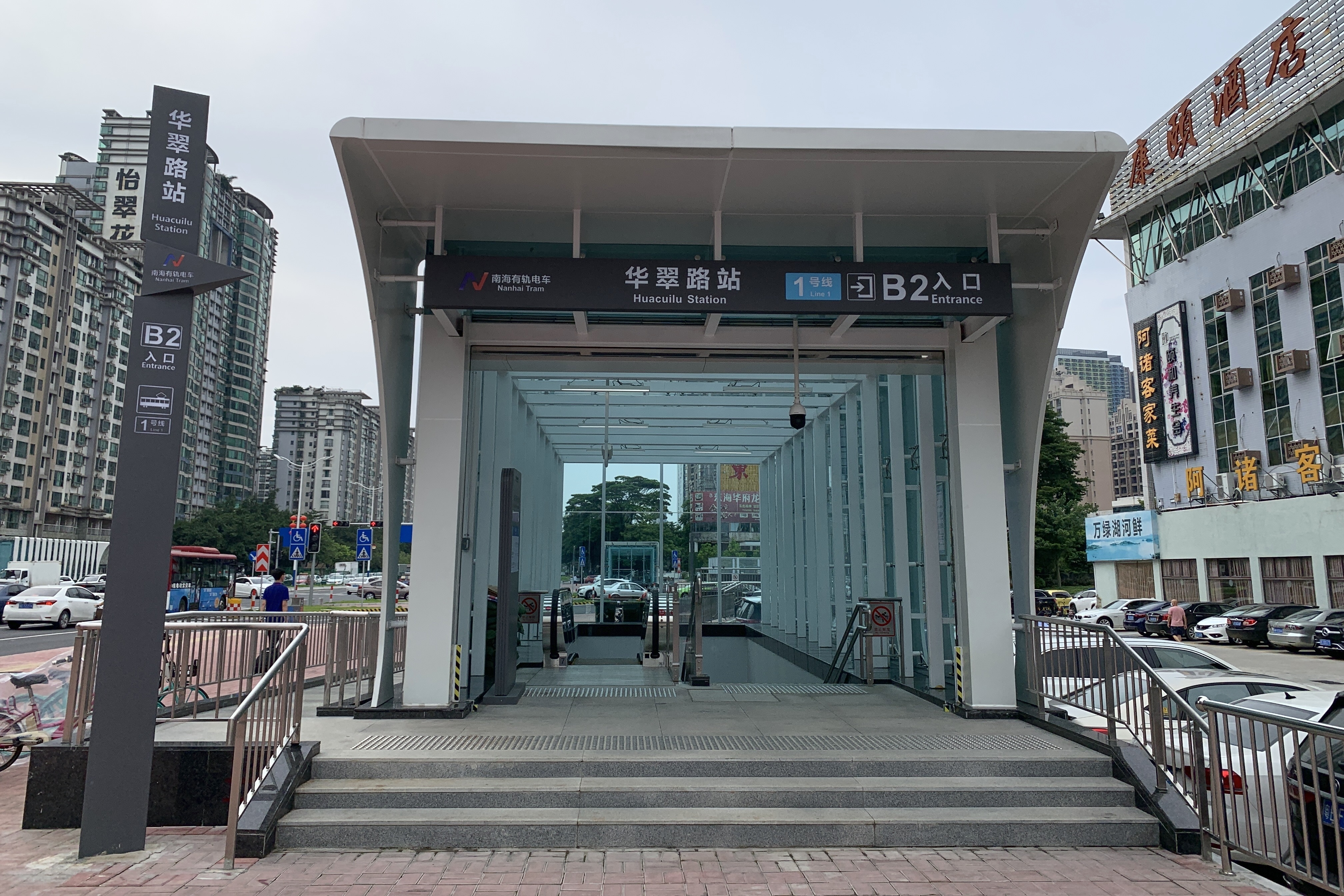
Entrance B2

== Gallery ==
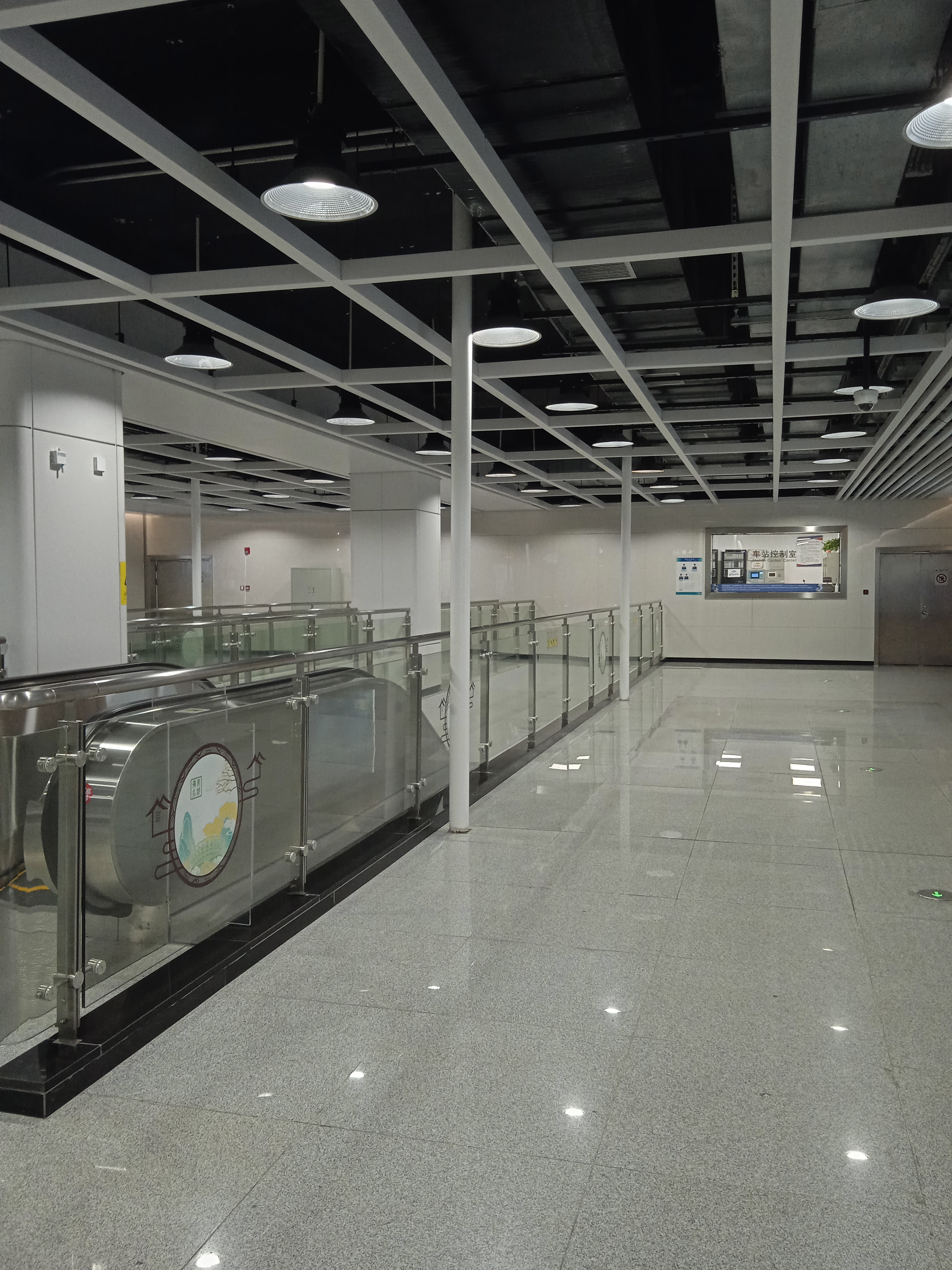
Concourse

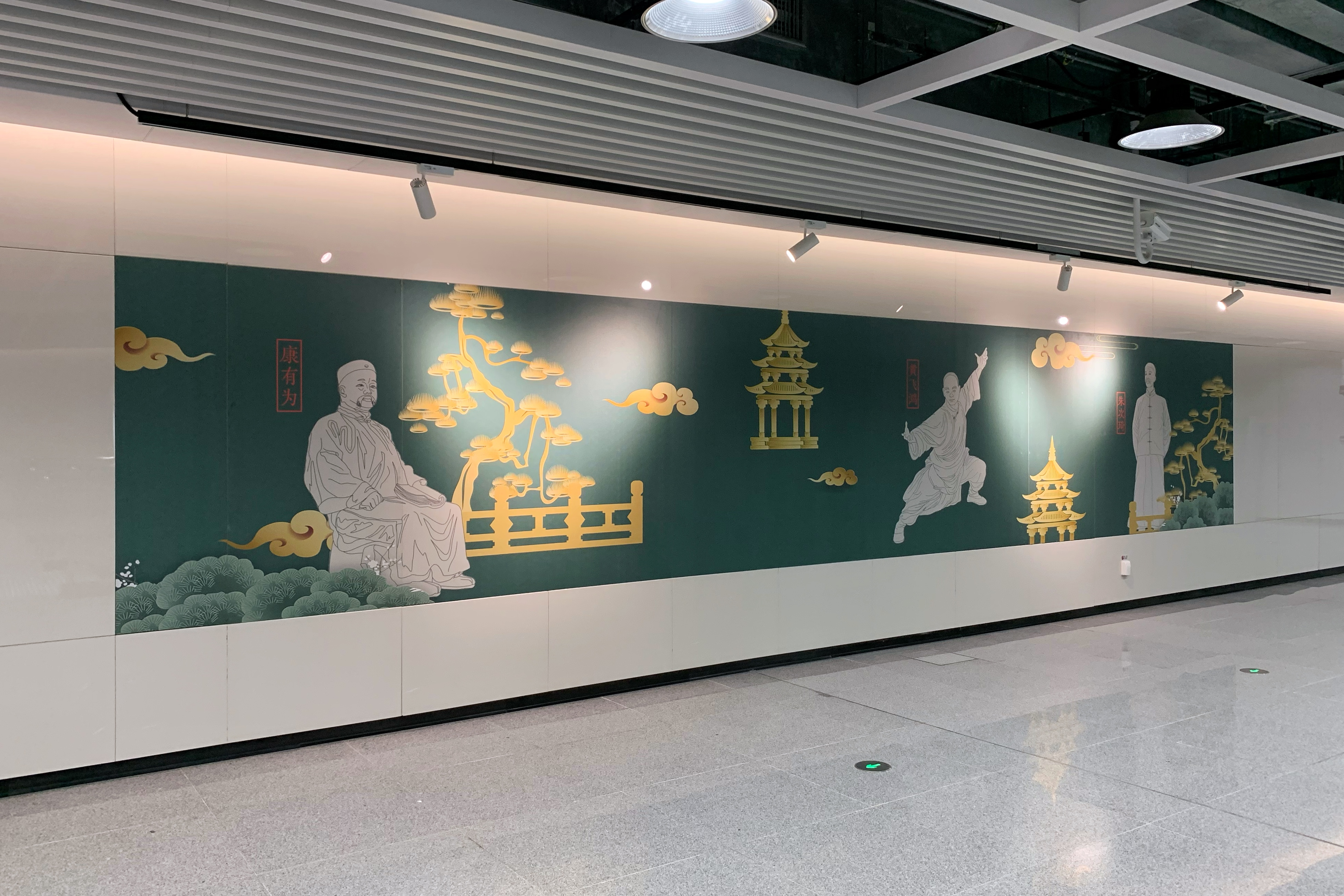
Cultural art wall installation

== History ==
The station topped out on 9 March 2016.
