= Line 1 (Nanhai Tram) =

Light metro in Guangdong Province, China

Nanhai Tram Line 1
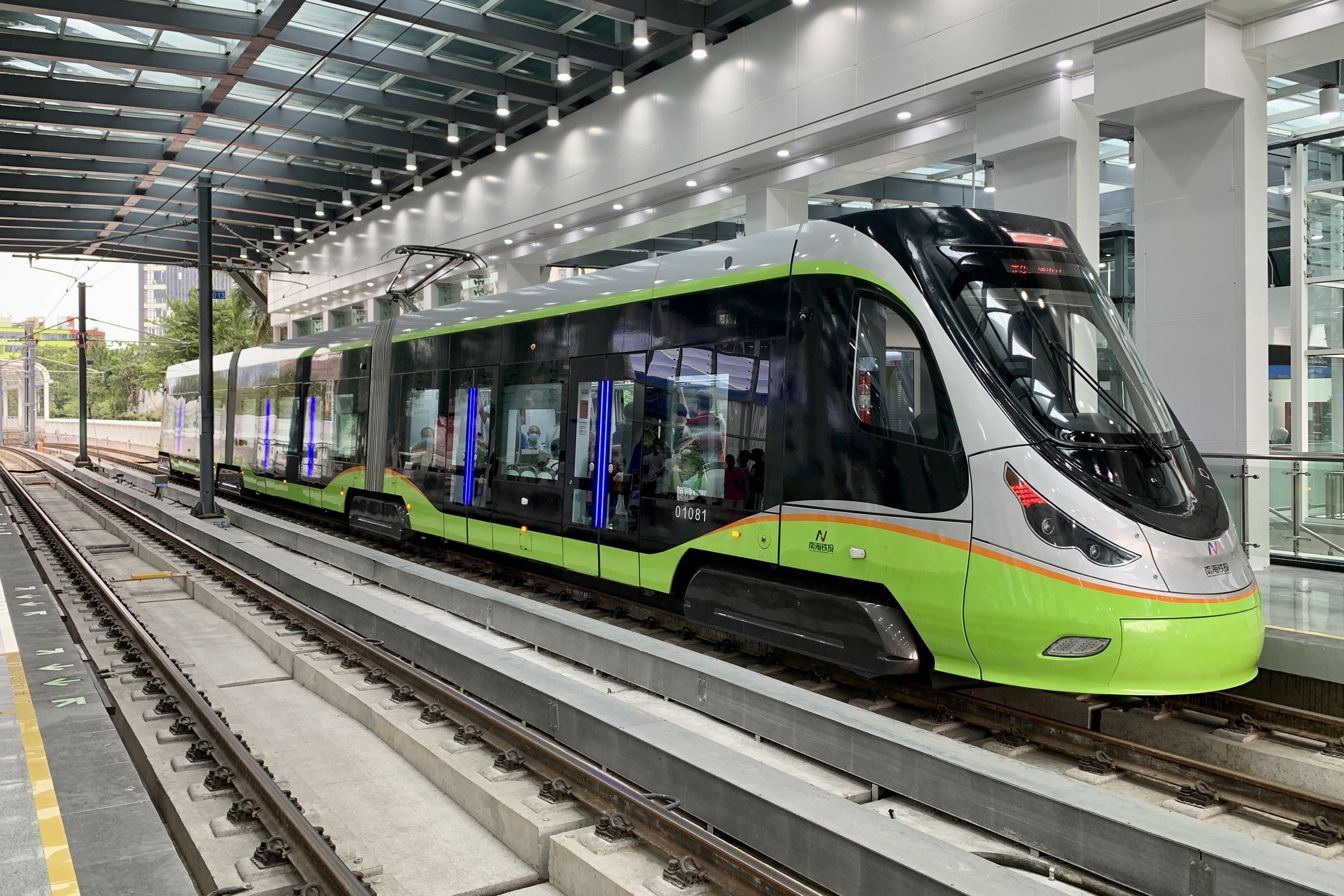
- A tram at Kangyi Park station

Overview
- Other name: Nanhai New Transit
- Status: Operational
- Locale: Nanhai District, Foshan
- Termini: Leigang; Linyuedong
- Stations: 15

Service
- Type: Light metro

History
- Opened: 18 August 2021; 4 years ago

Technical
- Line length: 14.345 km (8.9 mi)
- Track gauge: 1,435 mm (4 ft 8 1/2 in)

Nanhai Tram Line 1 (Chinese: 南海有轨电车1号线) or Nanhai New Transit (Chinese: 南海新交通) is a light metro line in Nanhai District, Foshan. The line uses light rail vehicles but has a completely grade-separated right-of-way and large, metro-style stations with platform screen doors when underground. Construction started in January 2014. The section from Leigang to Sanshanxinchengbei opened on 18 August 2021, and the section from Sanshanxinchengbei to Linyuedong opened on 29 November 2022.

== Opening timeline ==
Segment	Commencement	Length	Station(s)	Name
Leigang — Sanshanxinchengbei	18 August 2021	9.5 km (5.90 mi)	10	Initial section
Sanshanxinchengbei — Linyuedong	29 November 2022	4.845 km (3.01 mi)	5	Remaining section

== Stations ==
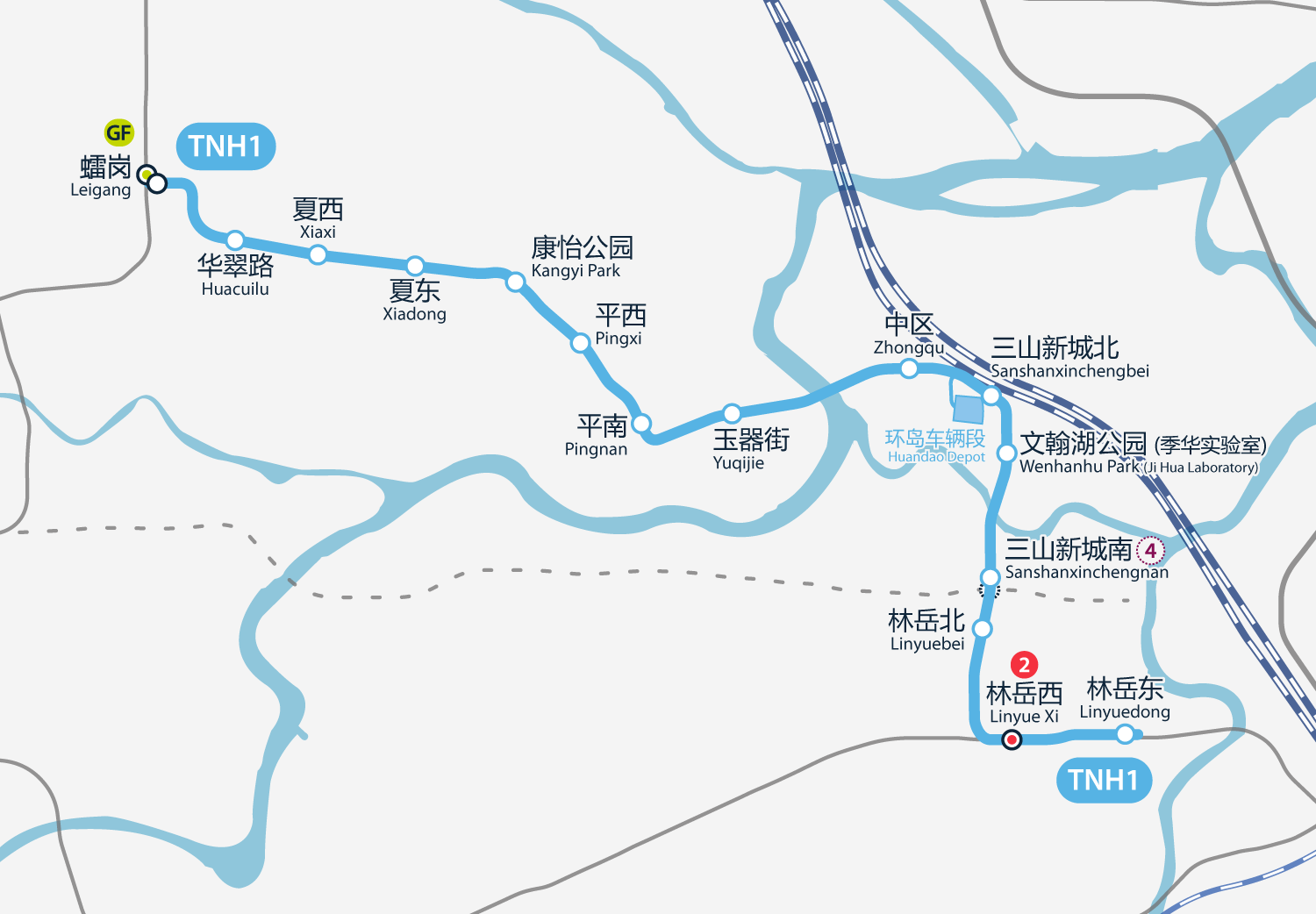
Map of Nanhai Tram Line 1

Station No.	Station name		Connections	Future Connections	Location
Station No.	English	Chinese	Connections	Future Connections	Location
TNH101	Leigang	𧒽岗	Guangfo GF13 (OSI)		Nanhai
TNH102	Huacuilu	华翠路			Nanhai
TNH103	Xiaxi	夏西			Nanhai
TNH104	Xiadong	夏东			Nanhai
TNH105	Kangyi Park	康怡公园			Nanhai
TNH106	Pingxi	平西			Nanhai
TNH107	Pingnan	平南			Nanhai
TNH108	Yuqijie	玉器街			Nanhai
TNH109	Zhongqu	中区			Nanhai
TNH110	Sanshanxinchengbei	三山新城北			Nanhai
TNH111	Wenhanhu Park (Ji Hua Laboratory)	文翰湖公园（季华实验室）			Nanhai
TNH112	Sanshanxinchengnan	三山新城南		4	Nanhai
TNH113	Linyuebei	林岳北			Nanhai
TNH114	Linyue Xi	林岳西	2 F225		Nanhai
TNH115	Linyuedong	林岳东	2 F226 (OSI)	11	Nanhai
