= Leigang station =

Guangfo Metro station in Foshan

Leigang 𧒽岗 (Note: Some Unihan systems may not have this character; it may be rendered by its two components: 虫雷.)
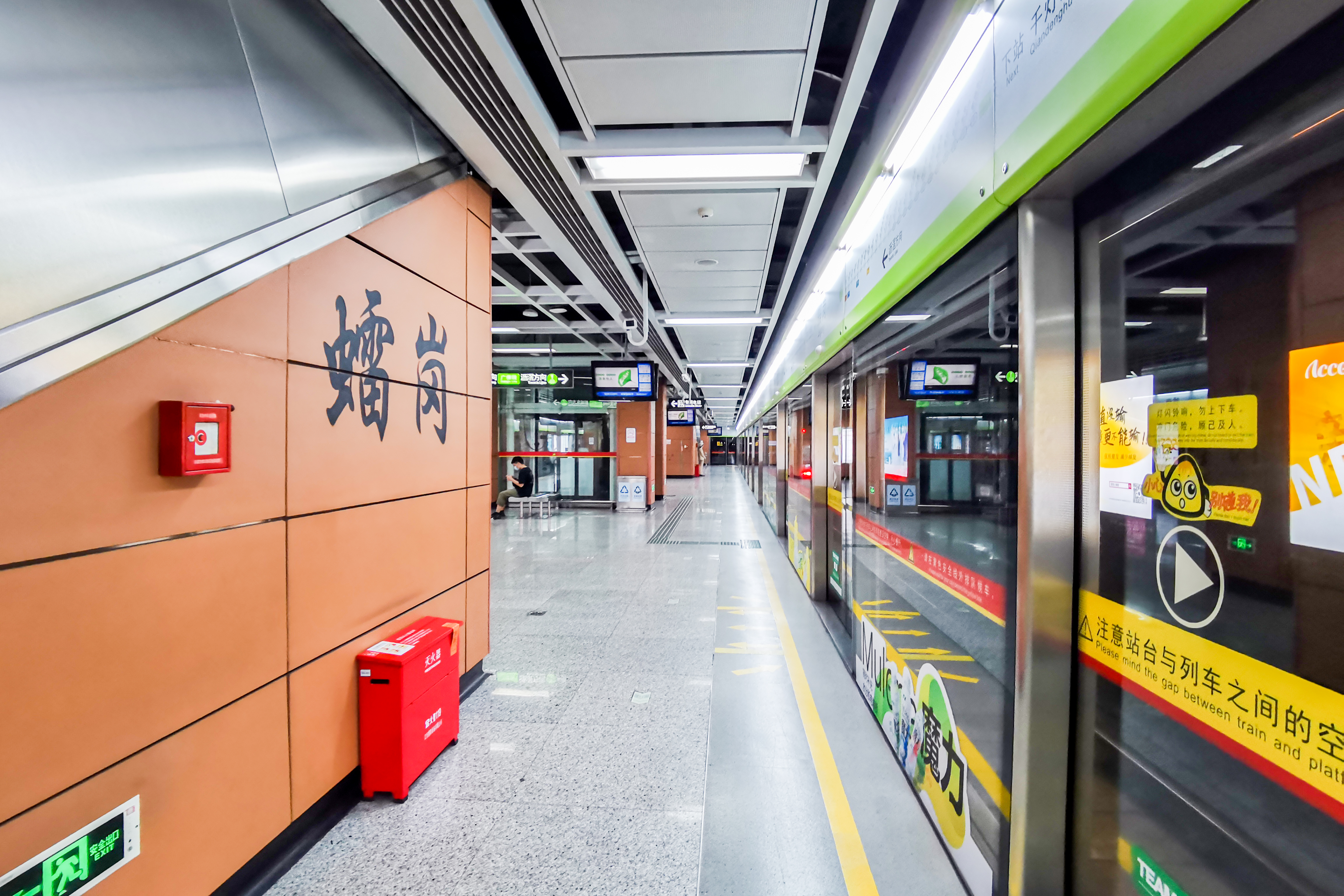
- Platform 1 (Guangfo line to Lijiao)

Chinese name
- Simplified Chinese: 𧒽岗站
- Traditional Chinese: 蠝崗站
Transcriptions
Standard Mandarin
- Hanyu Pinyin: Léigǎng Zhàn
Yue: Cantonese
- Jyutping: leoi^{5}gong^{1} zaam^{6}

General information
- Location: Nanhai District, Foshan, Guangdong; China
- Coordinates: 23°02′33″N 113°09′20″E
- Operated by: Foshan Railway Investment Construction Group Co. Ltd. Guangzhou Metro Co. Ltd.
- Lines: Guangfo Line; Nanhai Tram Line 1
- Platforms: 4 (1 island platform for Guangfo Line and 2 side platforms for Nanhai Tram Line 1)
- Tracks: 4

Construction
- Structure type: Underground
- Platform levels: 2
- Accessible: Yes

Other information
- Station code: GF13 TNH101

History
- Opened: 3 November 2010; 15 years ago (Guangfo Line); 18 August 2021; 4 years ago (Nanhai Tram Line 1)

Services
| Preceding station | Foshan Metro | Following station |
|---|---|---|
| Nangui Lu towards Xincheng Dong | Guangfo Line | Qiandeng Lake towards Lijiao |
| Terminus | Nanhai Tram Line 1 | Huacuilu towards Linyuedong |
Location

Leigang station (Chinese: 𧒽岗站) is a metro station on the Guangfo Line and the northwestern terminus of Nanhai Tram Line 1.

The platform of the Guangfo Line opened on 3 November 2010, and the platform of Nanhai Tram Line 1 opened on 18 August 2021.

== Location ==
It is located under the junction of Guilan Road (桂澜路) and Xiaping West Road (夏平西路), near Leigang Park (𧒽岗公园), in Guicheng Subdistrict in the Nanhai District of Foshan.

== Station information (Guangfo line) ==
| G | - | Exits A-C |
| L1; Concourse | Lobby | Customer Service, Shops, Vending machines, Police Station, Safety Facilities, Unpaid transfer passageway to TNH1 |
| L2; Platforms | Platform 2 | Guangfo towards Xincheng Dong (Nangui Lu) |
| L2; Platforms | Island platform, doors will open on the left |
| L2; Platforms | Platform 1 | Guangfo towards Lijiao (Qiandeng Lake) |

=== Exits ===
| Exit letter | | Gallery | Exit location |
|---|---|---|---|
| A | | | Guilan Road, Nanhai Tram Line 1 |
| B | | | Middle Xiaping Road |
| C | C1 | | Guilan Road, West Xiaping Road |
| C | C2 | | Guilan Road, Foping 2nd Road, Middle Xiaping Road, Guilan Road |

== Station information (Nanhai Tram Line 1) ==
| G | - | Exits A-D |
| L1; Concourse & Platforms | North Lobby | Ticket Machines, Customer Service, Safety Facilities, Restrooms, Unpaid transfer passageway to Guangfo |
| L1; Concourse & Platforms | Side platform, doors will open on the right |
| L1; Concourse & Platforms | Platform 1 | TNH1 towards Linyuedong (Huacuilu) |
| L1; Concourse & Platforms | Platform 2 | TNH1 towards Linyuedong (Huacuilu) |
| L1; Concourse & Platforms | Side platform, doors will open on the left |
| L1; Concourse & Platforms | South Lobby | Ticket Machines, Customer Service, Safety Facilities |
| L2 | Connecting passageway | Paid passage between platforms |

=== Exits ===
| Exit letter | Gallery | Exit location |
|---|---|---|
South concourse
| A | | West Xiaping Road, Guilan Road |
| D | | West Xiaping Road, Vanke Golden Area, Zhonghai Markham East Garden |
North concourse
| B | | West Xiaping Road, Guilan Road, Guangfo line Leigang station |
| C | | West Xiaping Road, Zhonghai Huanyu Tianxia |

== Gallery ==
=== Guangfo Line ===
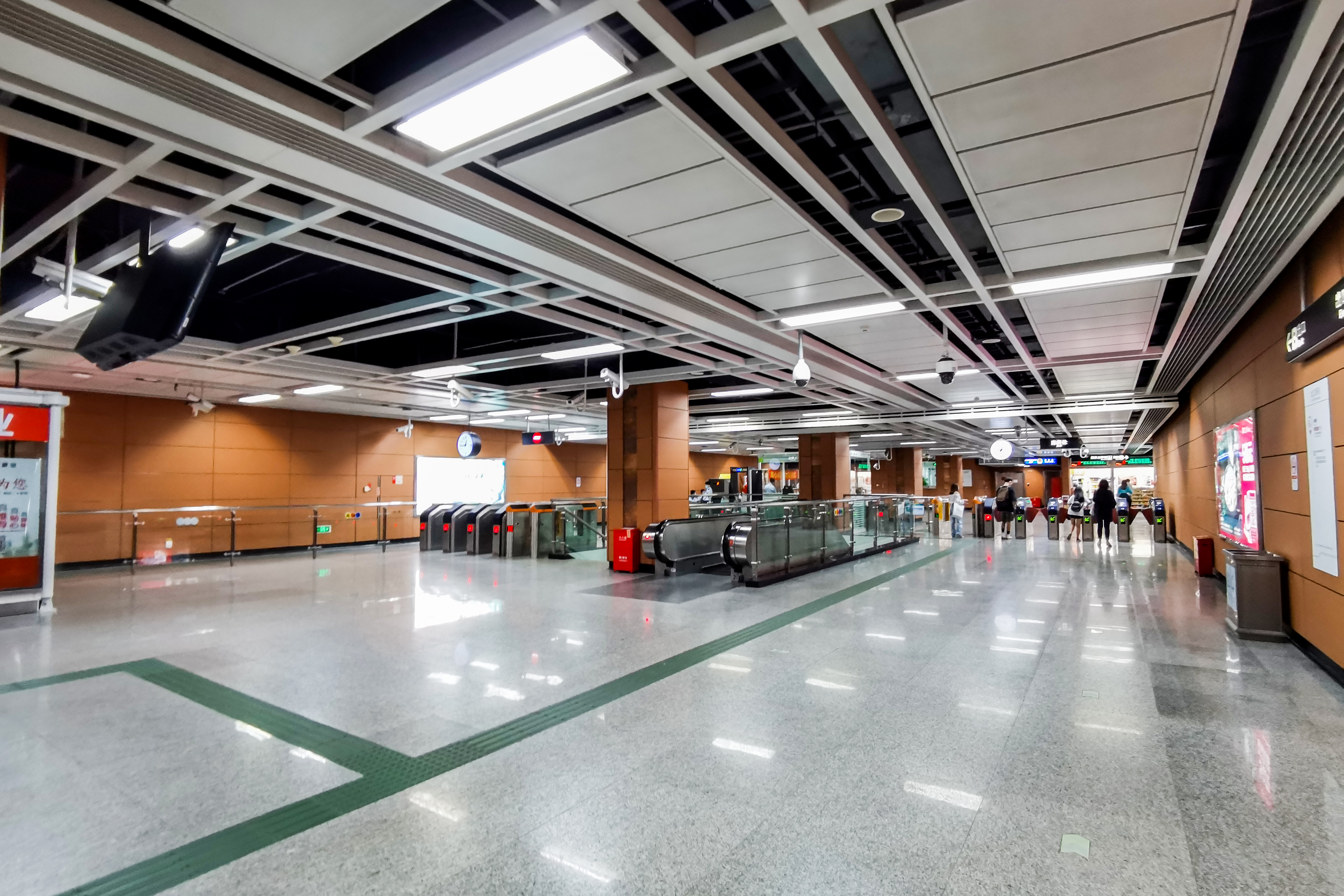
Concourse

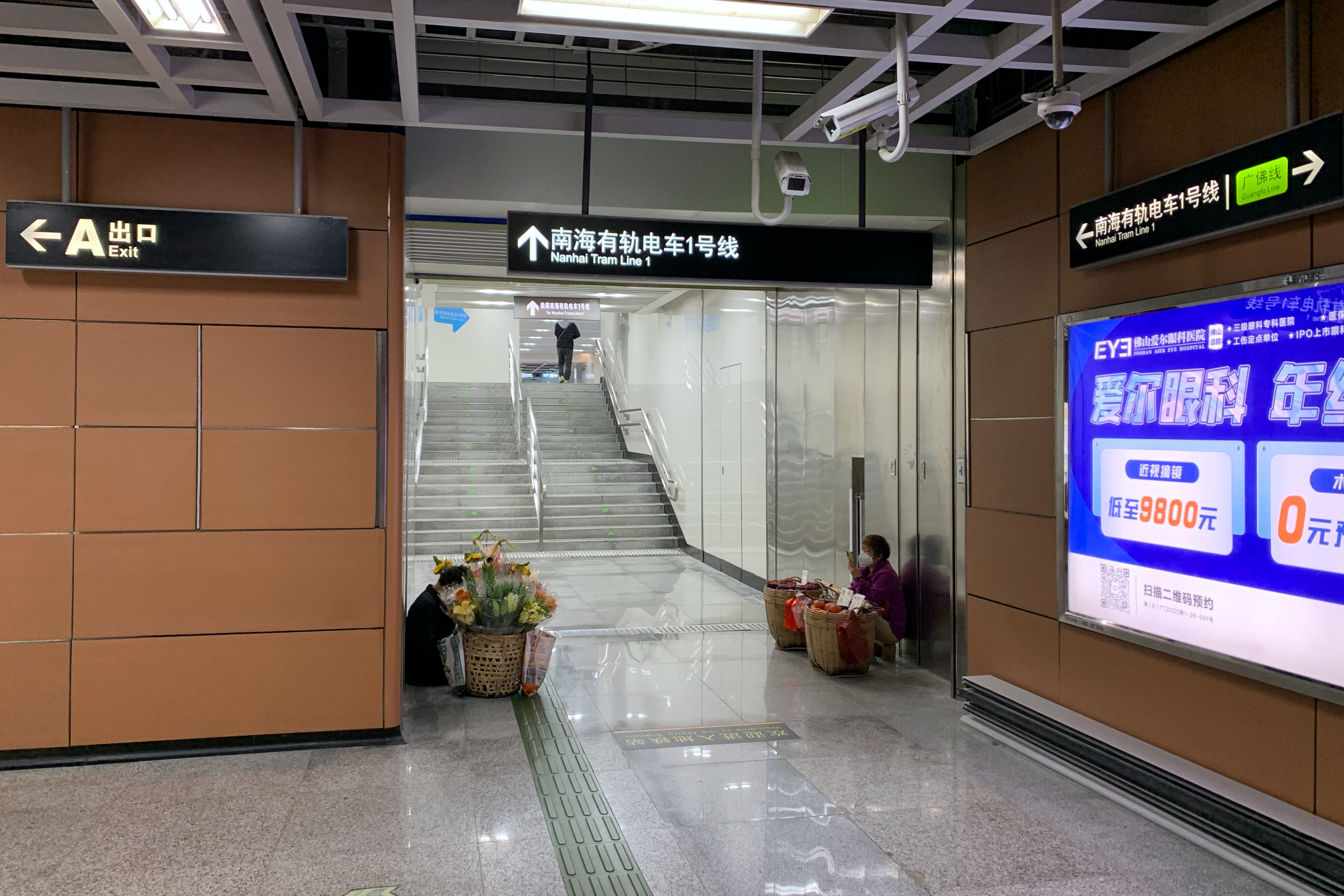
Unpaid transfer corridor to Nanhai Tram Line 1

=== Nanhai Tram Line 1 ===
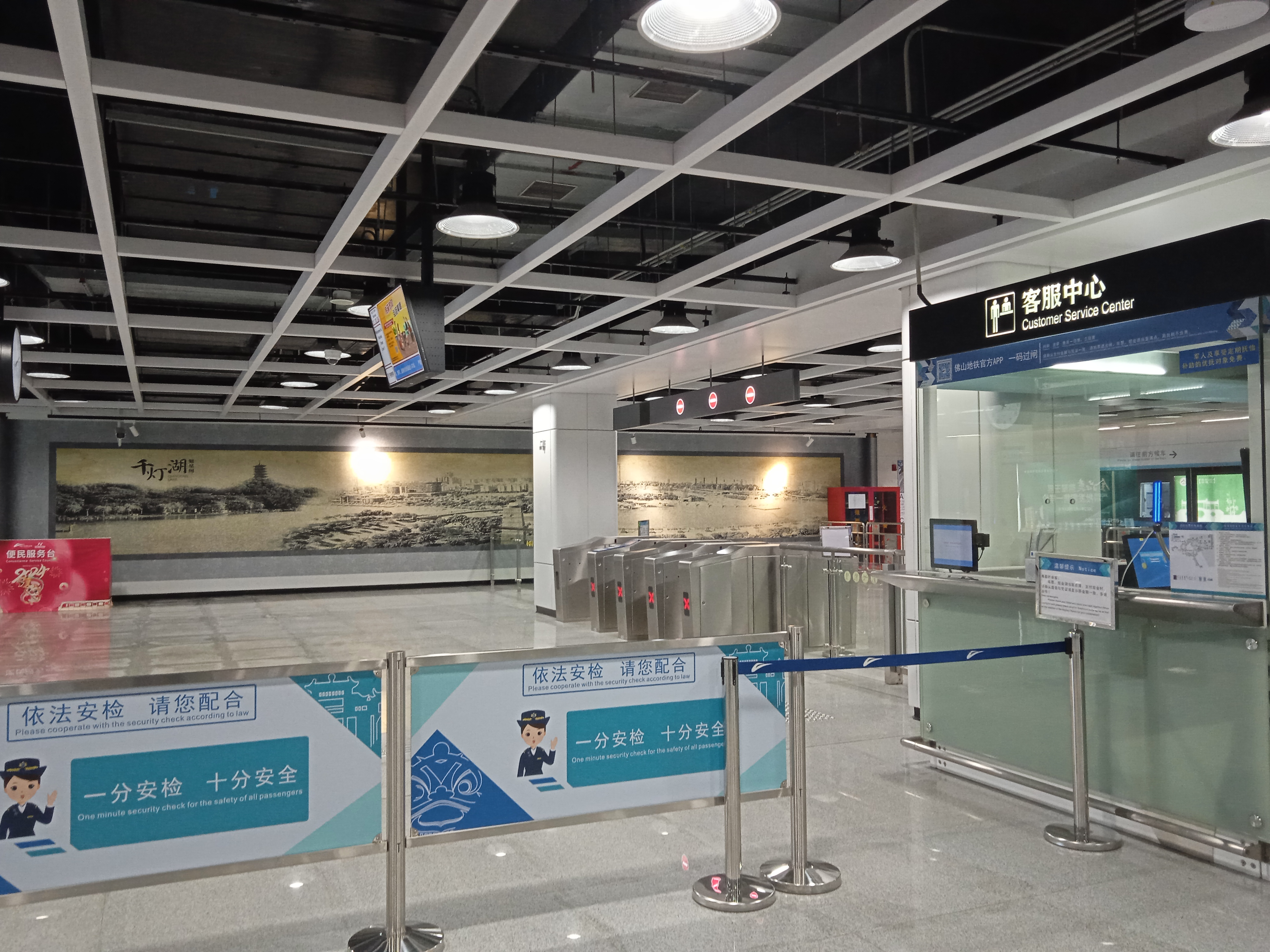
North concourse

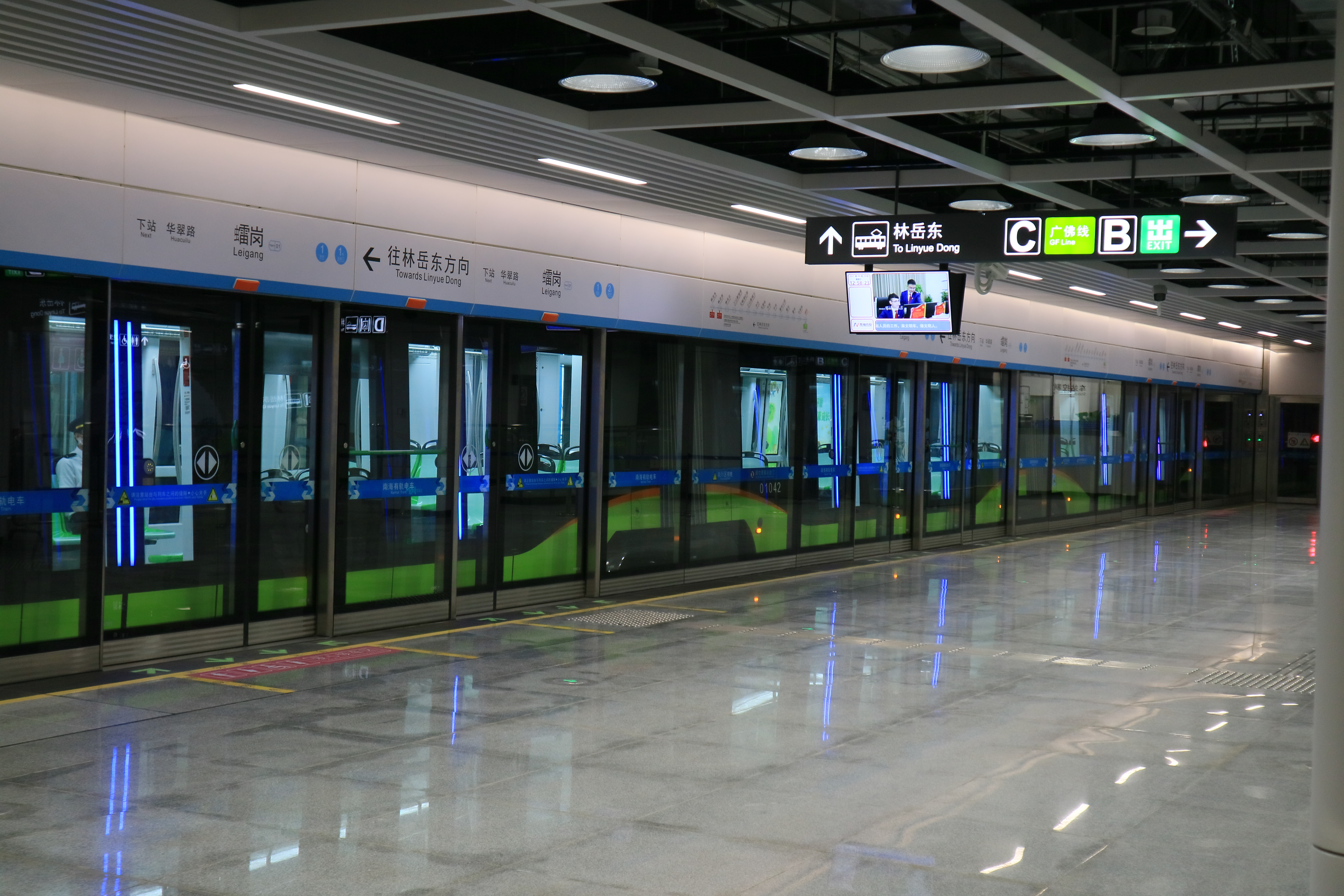
Platform 1
