= Guicheng Subdistrict, Foshan =

Subdistrict of Foshan, China

Coordinates: 23.0359°N 113.1975°E

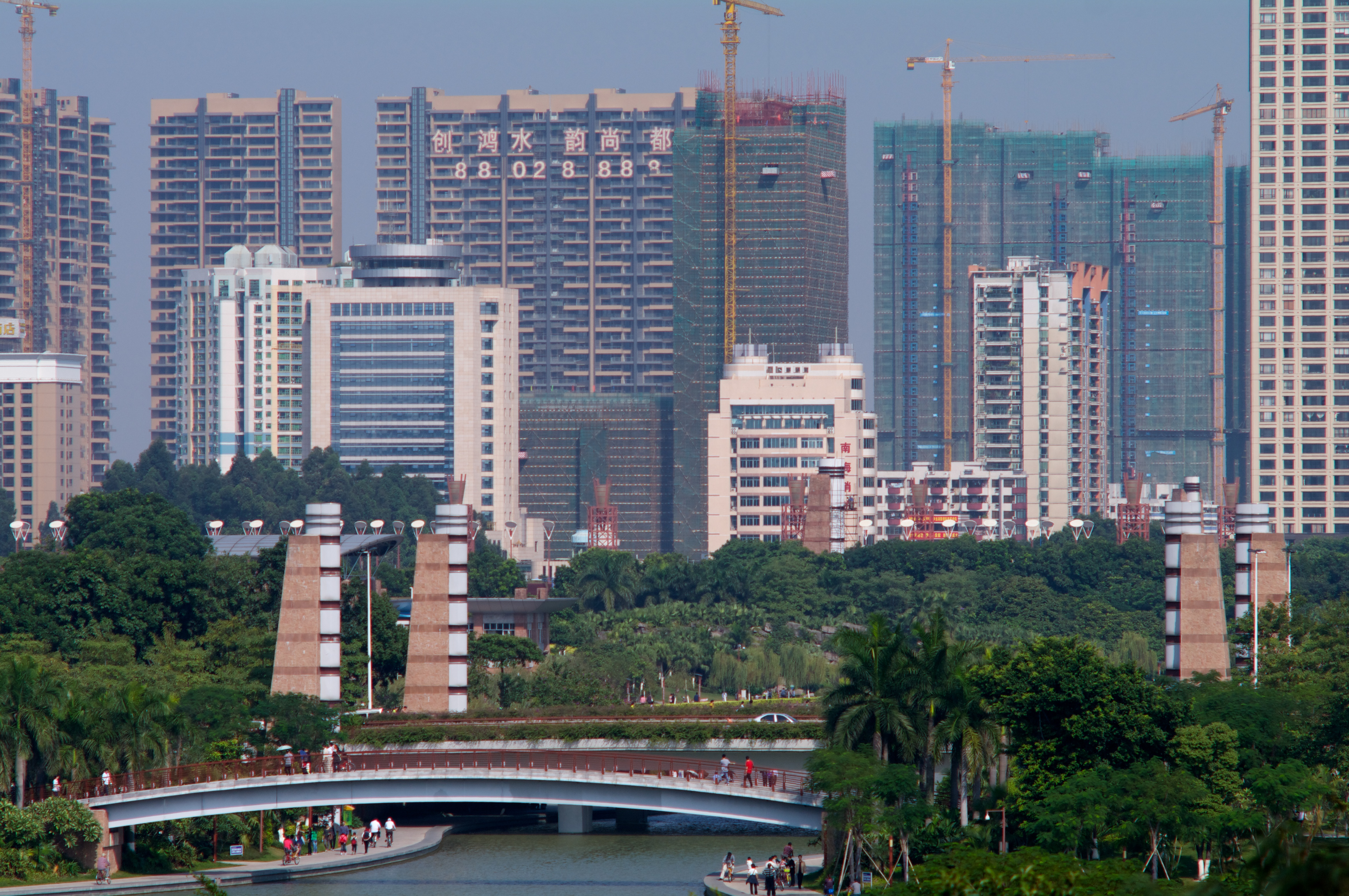
Guicheng Subdistrict

Guicheng Subdistrict (Chinese: 桂城街道) is a subdistrict of the Nanhai District, Foshan, Guangdong, China covering an area of 84.16 square kilometres (32.49 sq mi). The subdistrict has a registered population of 186,000 and floating population of 280,000 and is the location of the Nanhai District Government, as well as being the political, economic and cultural centre of Nanhai.
