= Zhangcha station =

Zhangcha station may refers to:

- Zhangcha railway station, station of Guangzhou-Zhaoqing (Guangzhou–Foshan Ring) intercity railway.
- Zhangcha station (Foshan Metro), station of Foshan Metro line 2 & line 4.
