= He Art Museum =

Chinese Art Museum

- 和美术馆
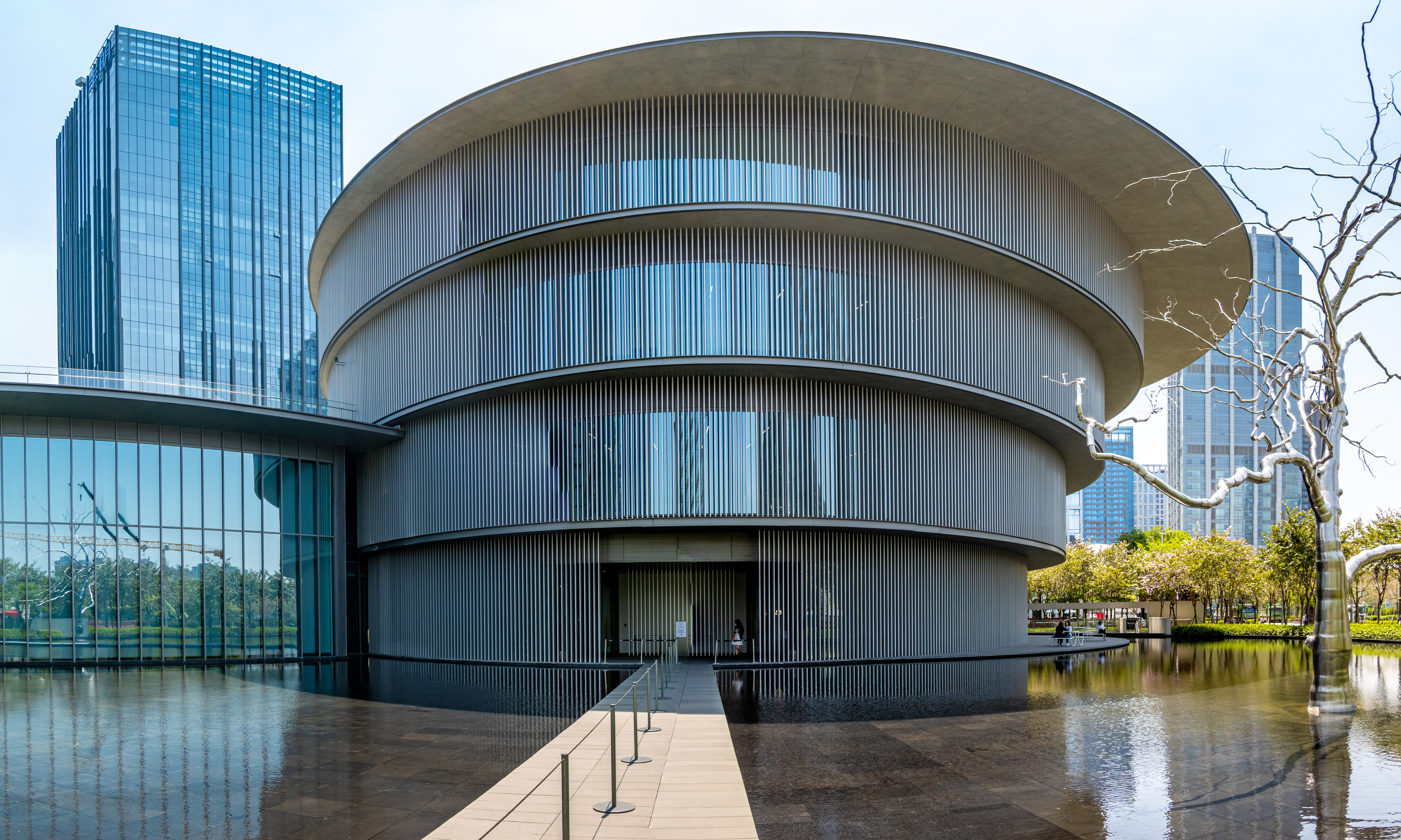
- The He Art Museum Entry

- Location within Guangdong Location within China
- Established: 2020
- Location: Shunde, Foshan, Guangdong Province, China
- Coordinates: 22°56′09″N 113°12′53″E
- Type: Art museum
- Website: www.hem.org

He Art Museum, located in Shunde, Foshan, Guangdong Province, China, He Art Museum (or HEM, Chinese: 和美术馆) is a privately funded non-profit museum designed by Pritzker Prize winner Tadao Ando.

Meaning harmony, balance and mixture, the museum's name "He" (Chinese: 和) takes the family name of its founder, He Jianfeng, son of Midea Group founder He Xiangjian.

== Architecture ==
The museum's stacked concrete rings above the reflecting pool

The overall design philosophy of the architecture is the idea of harmony. Through the double-helix staircase made with concrete, it presents various circles in different dynamics within the space.

The museum has a total floor area of about 16,000 square metres (172,000 sq ft), of which about 8,000 square metres (86,000 sq ft) is exhibition space. Ando took the circle motif from Lingnan building traditions and patterns. The exterior is formed by four concentric rings that widen eccentrically from the ground upwards, like ripples spreading on water; Ando said the design took the region's subtropical climate into account, giving the building strong effects of light and shadow. A reflecting pool echoing the circular form tempers the subtropical summer heat and, with the building mirrored in it, serves as its visual base.

The double-helix staircase in the central atrium

The centrepiece is a double-helix staircase in the central atrium, cast in place in fair-faced concrete and lit by natural light from the dome above.

== Exhibition ==
- Roni Horn. A Dream Not Dreamt, 2023.
- From the Mudane World – HEM Inaugural Exhibition
- Museum Collection Exhibition – including Chinese and international contemporary and modern artworks.
