= Ronggui Subdistrict =

Ronggui Sub-district 容桂街道办事处 Róngguì Jiēdào Bànshìchù
- Sub-district
- Map of the subdistrict
- Coordinates: 22.762231°N 113.258780°E
- Country: People's Republic of China
- Province: Guangdong
- Prefecture-level city: Foshan
- District: Shunde District

Area
  - Total: 80.17 km^{2} (30.95 sq mi)

Population
  - Total: 460,000
  - Density: 5,700/km^{2} (15,000/sq mi)
- Postal codes: 528303, 528305, 528306
- Area code: 0757
- Website: www.ronggui.gov.cn

Ronggui Sub-district (Chinese: 容桂街道) is a sub-district in Shunde, Foshan, Guangdong, China. It sits at the southeast of Shunde and a part of Shunde City Zone. It was formed by the merging of Rongqi Town (容奇镇) and Guizhou Town (桂州镇). It has a resident population of 460,000 within its area of 80 square kilometers.

It is one of the largest production bases of electric appliances in China. Appliance manufacturers, such as Rongsheng (容声), Hisense Kelon (海信科龙), Wanjiale (万家乐), Galanz (格兰仕) and Wanhe (万和), are headquartered in Ronggui.

== History ==
Rongqi and Guizhou were initially separate towns, both administrated by Shunde district. After Feb. 2, 2000, the towns were abolished and Ronggui subdistrict was established.

In 1452, Shunde was founded as a county and Rongqi and Guizhou were villages belonging to Shunde County.

In 1928, Rongqi Village became Rongqi Town but Guizhou remained a village and was administrated by Rongqi.

In 1959, both Rongqi and Guizhou were changed into people's communes.

In 1983, the people's commune was rescinded and Rongqi and Guizhou became towns.

In 2000, Rongqi town and Guizhou town were rescinded and Ronggui subdistrict was established.

== Administration ==
Twenty-three neighborhood committees and three village committees make up Ronggui Subdistrict.

Name	Chinese (S)	Hanyu Pinyin	Administrative code (2006)
Guizhou Community	桂州社区	gùizhōu shèqū	440606006001
Shangjieshi Community	上街市社区	shàngjiēshì shèqū	440606006002
Rongshan Community	容山社区	róngshān shèqū	440606006003
Zhenhua Community	振华社区	zhènhuá shèqū	440606006004
Weihong Community	卫红社区	wèihóng shèqū	440606006005
Dongfeng Community	东凤社区	dōngfèng shèqū	440606006006
Chaoyang Community	朝阳社区	cháoyáng shèqū	440606006007
Rongxin Community	容新社区	rongxin shèqū	440606006008
Desheng Community	德胜社区	déshèng shèqū	440606006009
Xijiao Community	细滘社区	xìjiào shèqū	440606006010
Hongxing Community	红星社区	hóngxīng shèqū	440606006011
Xingfu Community	幸福社区	xìngfú shèqū	440606006012
Hongqi Community	红旗社区	hóngqí shèqū	440606006013
Siji Community	四基社区	sìjī shèqū	440606006014
Dafuji Community	大福基社区	dàfújī shèqū	440606006015
Haiwei Community	海尾社区	háiwéi shèqū	440606006016
Nanqu Community	南区社区	nánqū shèqū	440606006017
Rongli Community	容里社区	rónglǐ shèqū	440606006018
Xiaohuangpu Community	小黄圃社区	xiǎohuángpú shèqū	440606006019
Rongbian Community	容边社区	róngbiān shèqū	440606006020
Bianjiao Community	扁滘社区	biǎnjiào shèqū	440606006021
Huakou Community	华口社区	huákǒu shèqū	440606006022
Gaoli Community	高黎社区	gāolí shèqū	440606006023
Suixiang Village	穗香村	suìxiāng cūn	440606006201
Longchongkou Village	龙涌口村	lóngchōng cūn	440606006202
Manggang Village	马冈村	mǎgāng cūn	440606006203

== Economy ==
Since the reform and opening up began in 1978, the people of Shunde were given control over their situation. This has allowed Ronggui, once a traditional agricultural county, to gradually develop into a modern industrial town. By 2012, the Ronggui GDP had reached 38.66 billion yuan. Its industrial and commercial tax revenue reached 5.186 billion and the balance of savings deposits of Ronggui's residents had reached 29.035 billion. Many industrial companies were founded in Ronggui, such as Rongsheng (容声), Hisense Kelon (海信科龙), Wanjiale (万家乐), Galanz (格兰仕) and Wanhe (万和).

Ronggui is home to the Charming Innovation Center (CIC). CIC boasts modern business and leisure facilities based in the Xingfucun community.

== Architecture ==
=== Shusheng bridge ===
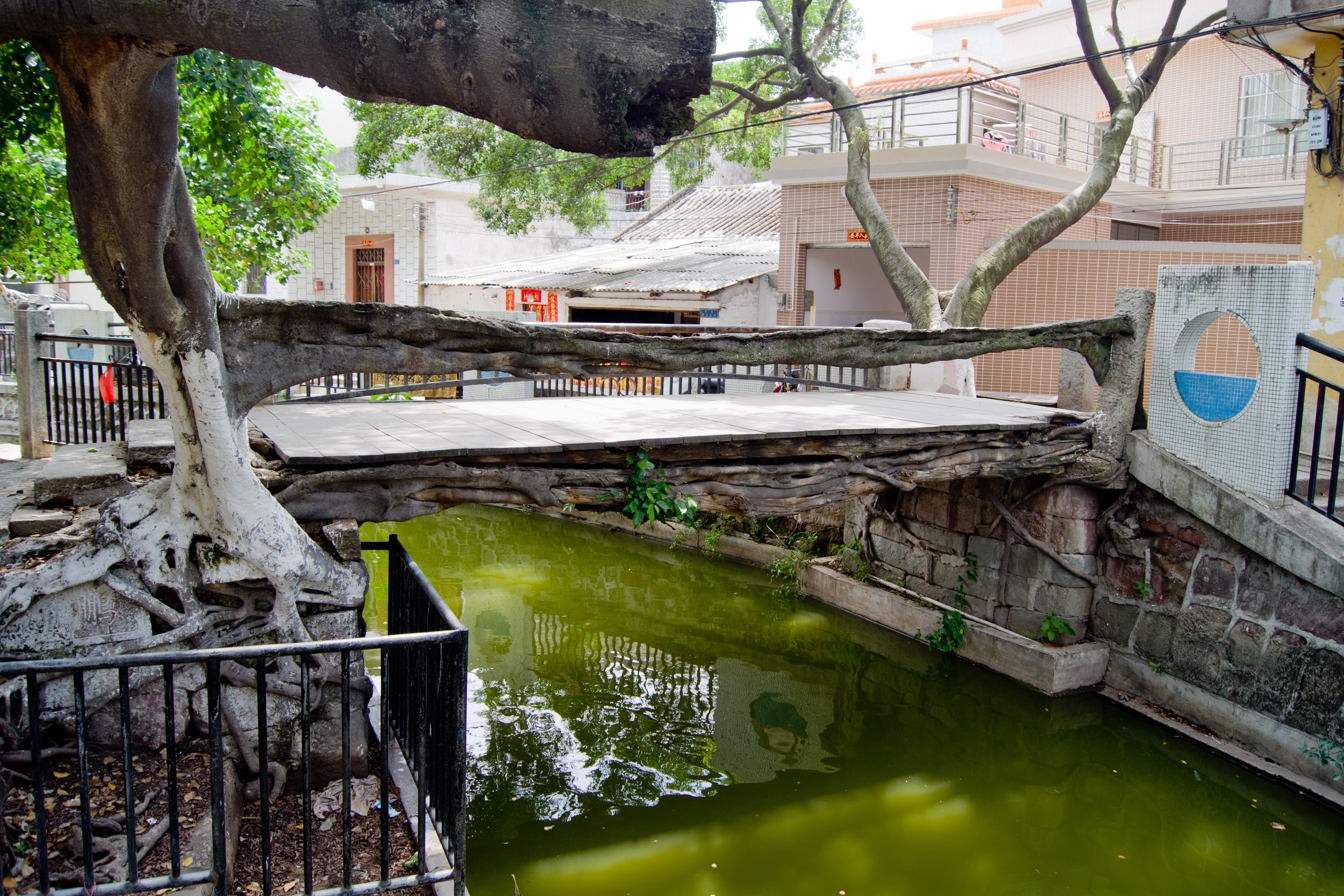
Shusheng Bridge of Ronggui

Shusheng bridge is located in the Rongli Committee of Ronggui. It was built in the 18th century. It is made of the root of a banyan beside the river. It was said the quondam bridge was broken frequently. In order to rectify this issue, the villagers drew the root of that banyan across the river and stuck it in the opposite bank. Over time, the root grew bigger and bigger. Once it was large enough, the villagers added planks atop the root and the bridge was built. This bridge remains in use.

=== Guizhou Wenta (Wen Tower) ===
The Guizhou Wenta (桂洲文塔) was built in 1794 CE. The tower is located south of Guizhou Lion Mountain and turned towards the east. It was as tall as 42 meters with 7 floors. The tower is shaped as a hexagon. In the twenty-first century, the tower stood alone in the wilderness. In 2007 the government repaired the Guizhou Wenta again and put up many communal facilities around the tower, including a library, swimming pool and basketball court. Guizhou Wenta had become an attractive destination.
