= Comb Sister =

Chinese traditional woman culture

Comb Sisters, also known as Self-comb Women (自梳女; zìshūnǚ; zi^{6}so^{1}neoi^{5-2}), are a group of women who set up their own hairstyle in a way that resembles that of married women. This is seen as a demonstration of their determination to remain single for the rest of their lives.

Traditionally, Han women from the Pearl River delta (such as Guangzhou and Heyuan cities) in the Qing dynasty wore their hair in long braids before getting married. When a woman got married, the elder women in the family would help comb her braid into a bun. However, the comb sisters would do so on their own as a declaration of not getting married and asserting their self-reliance.

== History ==
=== Origin ===
Shunde

The origin of the Comb Sister tradition can be traced back to the rigid feudal system in ancient China. Many women were subjected to abuse by their husbands and chose to forgo marriage, instead opting to stay with partners who would support each other until death. Han women in southern China historically had limited opportunities and were subject to harsh "family laws" that were particularly punishing towards them. Their marital choices were restricted and they held a lower status in their husbands' families until they bore sons.

This situation persisted for over 300 years under the oppressive feudal system, but began to wane in the mid to late Ming dynasty with the rise of the silk industry in Shunde. Women were able to gain financial independence through mulberry planting, silkworm rearing, and silk reeling. By the 1930s, the number of comb sisters had decreased due to the improvement of women's social status and the impact of war. This tradition of self-combing began to spread in the Pearl River Delta from Shunde.

=== Historical Development ===
In traditional Chinese women's culture, becoming a comb sister involved a special ceremony. Villagers of high reputation would select a "Lucky Day and Lucky Time" to hold the ceremony. Several elder women would host the combing ceremony, during which women who wanted to become comb sisters would change their hairstyle and make a vow to never get married. The village would then announce the decision to their friends and the public with a celebratory feast.

Prior to the 1930s, young women in the Pearl River Delta worked in the silk industry. As the industry declined, they sought higher-paying work in Southeast Asia, with many migrating to Singapore. A significant number of these women chose not to marry so that they could earn more money. Women who worked in silk industries earned more money, which enabled them to support their own expenses and also supplement their family's income. As a result, they were often unwilling to marry men who earned less than them.

Following the 1911 revolution and the establishment of the Republic of China, the feudal system and customs broke down, leading to a decline in the practice of comb sisters. Additionally, China's silk industry collapsed in the early years of the Republic, leaving comb sisters unable to earn a living. Consequently, some of them chose to work as housemaids in Hong Kong. The modern-day Tsat Tsz Mui Road in Hong Kong has its origins in the history of these comb sisters.

== Customs and Taboos ==
Self-combing ceremonies usually took place in the house of the comb sisters (姑婆屋; gūpówū; gu^{1}po^{4}uk). On the eve of self-combing, one must take a bath with "fragrant soup" made by boiling cypress leaves and yellow skin leaves in water. Then, the trusted comb sister would instruct on how to stand firm in the family and society, how to remain celibate and self-reliant, and how to support each other among the comb sisters.

The next morning, they would go to the temple and offer sacrifices of pigs, cows, and sheep along with new clothes to Guanyin. After taking an oath, they would untie their long braids and make a bun, put on the new clothes, and bow to Guanyin and the future cohabiting sisters, accepting their congratulations. Finally, they would go home, announce to their parents and family that they have completed self-combing, and distribute the sacrifices to relatives and friends. The ceremony was then concluded.

Once women decided to change their hairstyle to become comb sisters, they had no choice but to continue. Breaking their promise would result in torture by their villagers, such as being loaded into a pig cage and drowned in the river. However, even after death, it was still unacceptable for their parents to bury them.

Comb sisters were not allowed to die at their mothers’ or other relatives' house. After their death, their parents could not handle their bodies for burial. Instead, fellow comb sisters would lay them on the doorstep, cover them with mats, and bury them in a shallow grave. If there were no other comb sisters in the village to handle the burial, the body would be thrown into the river. Worse still, only other comb sisters could visit the grave, hence, some of them became their friends' grave keepers, and that was the custom of "Grave Keeping ". Therefore, comb sisters jointly purchased houses to support each other and avoid being buried without a proper funeral.

== Bing Yu Tang（ Chinese characters: 冰玉堂 ) ==
Map of Shunde (Jun'an is the green area at the bottom)

Bing Yu Tang is one of the houses where the comb sisters have purchased and lived, it is a two-story building with three underground blocks located in Jun'an, Shunde. In the middle block, there is a statue of Avalokiteśvara, while the left and right blocks contain tablets for comb sisters who have passed away. The second floor serves as the living quarters for the comb sisters. The building covers nearly two acres and has a total area of about five hundred square meters. Bing Yu Tang was opened to the public on December 25, 2012.

Although the lives of the comb sisters may have come to an end, the existence of Bing Yu Tang as a cultural heritage site ensures that their stories will not disappear with their departure - it has become an extension of their lives. As an open site, it documents, reproduces, and shares comb sisters’ lived experiences. The comb sisters themselves are not presented passively, but they also hope to actively share their experiences by exhibiting past stories and objects to the public.

== See Also ==
- Beguines and Beghards, lay religious orders in Middle Ages which members vows not to marry.
