= Paul Fang =

Businessman

- 方洪波
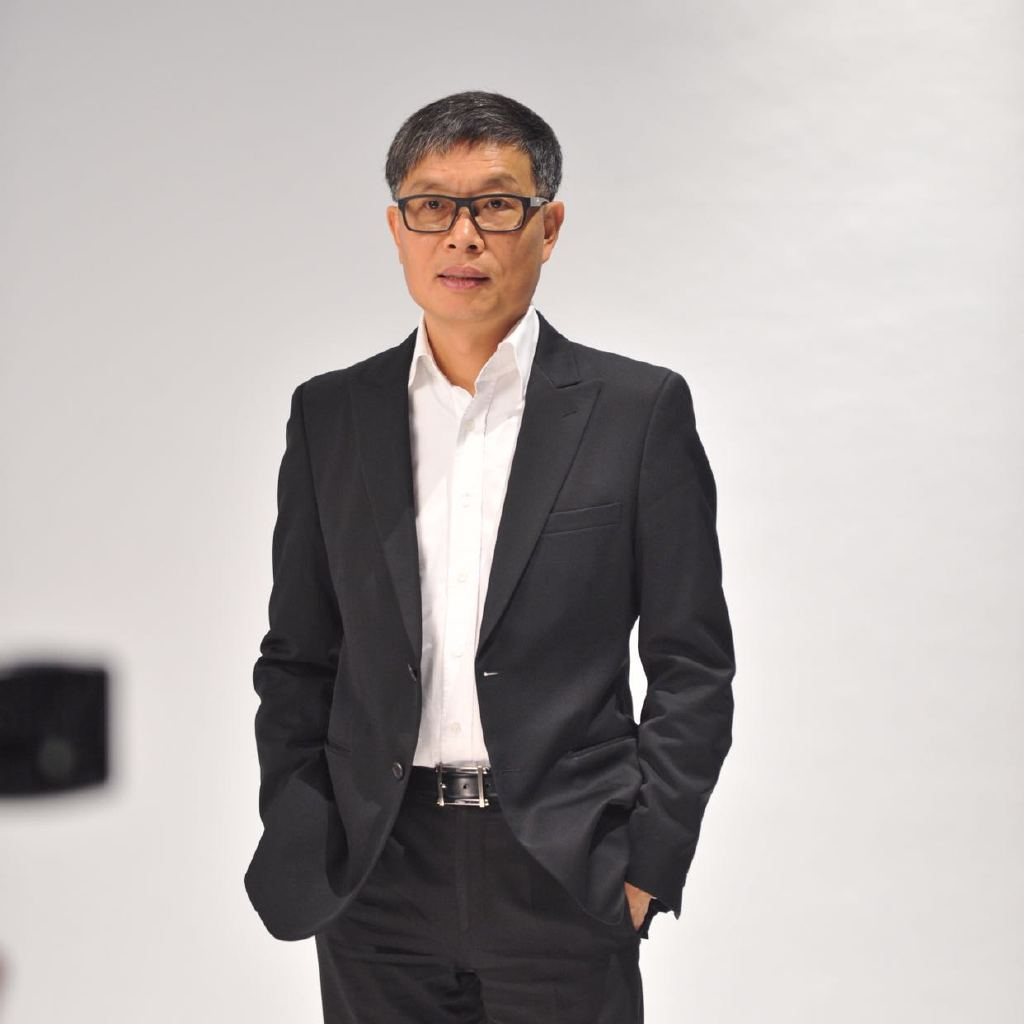
- Born: Anhui, China
- Education: National University of Singapore, East China Normal University
- Occupations: Chairman and President, Midea

Paul Fang (Chinese: 方洪波; pinyin: Fāng Hóngbō), is the current Chairman and President of Midea Group., a Fortune 500 company, and the largest producer of major appliances in the world.

== Education ==
Fang has earned a Bachelor's Degree in History from East China Normal University and an EMBA from the National University of Singapore.

== Career ==
Fang joined Midea in 1992, first in the Marketing Department, later being promoted to General Manager of the firm's Air Conditioning Business Department, followed by President of Midea Refrigeration Electric Appliances Group, and then Chairman and President of GD Midea Holding Co., Ltd.

In 2013, upon the retirement of Midea founder He Xiangjian, he was appointed as the Chairman and President of Midea Group Co., Ltd. (000333.SZ). He is also currently the chairman of the company’s subsidiary, Wuxi LittleSwan Co., Ltd. (000418.SZ).
