= Lang–Gu dispute =

The Lang–Gu dispute (Chinese: 郎顾之争; pinyin: Láng–Gù zhī zhēng) was a dispute in China about the privatization process adopted during Deng Xiaoping's reform and opening up. New Left academic Larry Lang (郎咸平), a critic of the reforms, accused a private entrepreneur, Gu Chujun (顾雏军), of having usurped state assets. Gu was later imprisoned in January 2008. This incidence had a short-term effect on the Chinese government, who halted privatizations after the debate. Generally, Chinese academic has reservation about this debate.
