= Longjiang, Shunde =

Longjiang 龙江
- Town
- 龙江镇
- Location within Guangdong
- Coordinates: 22°53′07″N 113°04′33″E
- Country: China
- Province: Guangdong
- Prefecture-level city: Foshan
- District: Shunde

Area
  - Total: 78.3 km^{2} (30.2 sq mi)
- Elevation: 8 m (26 ft)

Population
  - Total: 180,000
  - Density: 2,300/km^{2} (6,000/sq mi)
- Time zone: UTC+8 (China Standard)
- Area code: 440606104

Longjiang (simplified Chinese: 龙江; traditional Chinese: 龍江; pinyin: Lóngjiāng; Jyutping: Lung^{4}gong^{1}; lit. 'dragon river') is a town in west-central Guangdong province, Southern China. It is under the administration of Shunde District, Foshan City, which lies 15 kilometres (9.3 mi) to the north-northeast.

The town covers an area of 78.3 square kilometres (30.2 sq mi). It has direct jurisdiction over 9 residential committees and 13 rural committees, totalling 180,000.
