= He Xiangjian =

Chinese Billionaire Businessman

Hé Xiǎngjiàn 何享健
- Born: 5 October 1942 (age 83); Shunde, Foshan, Guangdong, China
- Occupation: Businessman
- Known for: Co-founder, Midea
- Spouse: Married
- Children: 3

He Xiangjian (Chinese: 何享健; pinyin: Hé Xiǎngjiàn; Jyutping: Ho4 Hoeng2 Gin6, born 5 October 1942) is the co-founder of Midea, one of China's largest appliance makers. In September 2021, his net worth was estimated to be $28.8 billion by Bloomberg Billionaires Index, positioning him at the 51st place in the index.

== Life ==
In 1968, in Beijiao, Guangdong, He formed a lid production company that would later become Midea.

He stepped down from operations of Midea in 2012.

He is married, has three children, and lives in Foshan, in Junlan International Golf Life Village, a villa neighbourhood developed by Midea Real Estate Group.

He is a noted art collector and the founder of the He Art Museum, a privately funded non-profit institution designed by Pritzker Prize-winning architect Tadao Ando.

In June 2020, there was an attempted kidnapping of He. Assailants reportedly broke into his villa in Foshan. His son, He Jianfeng, escaped and alerted the local police, who rescued He and arrested five suspects.
