= Zhangcha railway station =

Railway station in Chancheng District, Foshan, Guangdong

Zhangcha 张槎
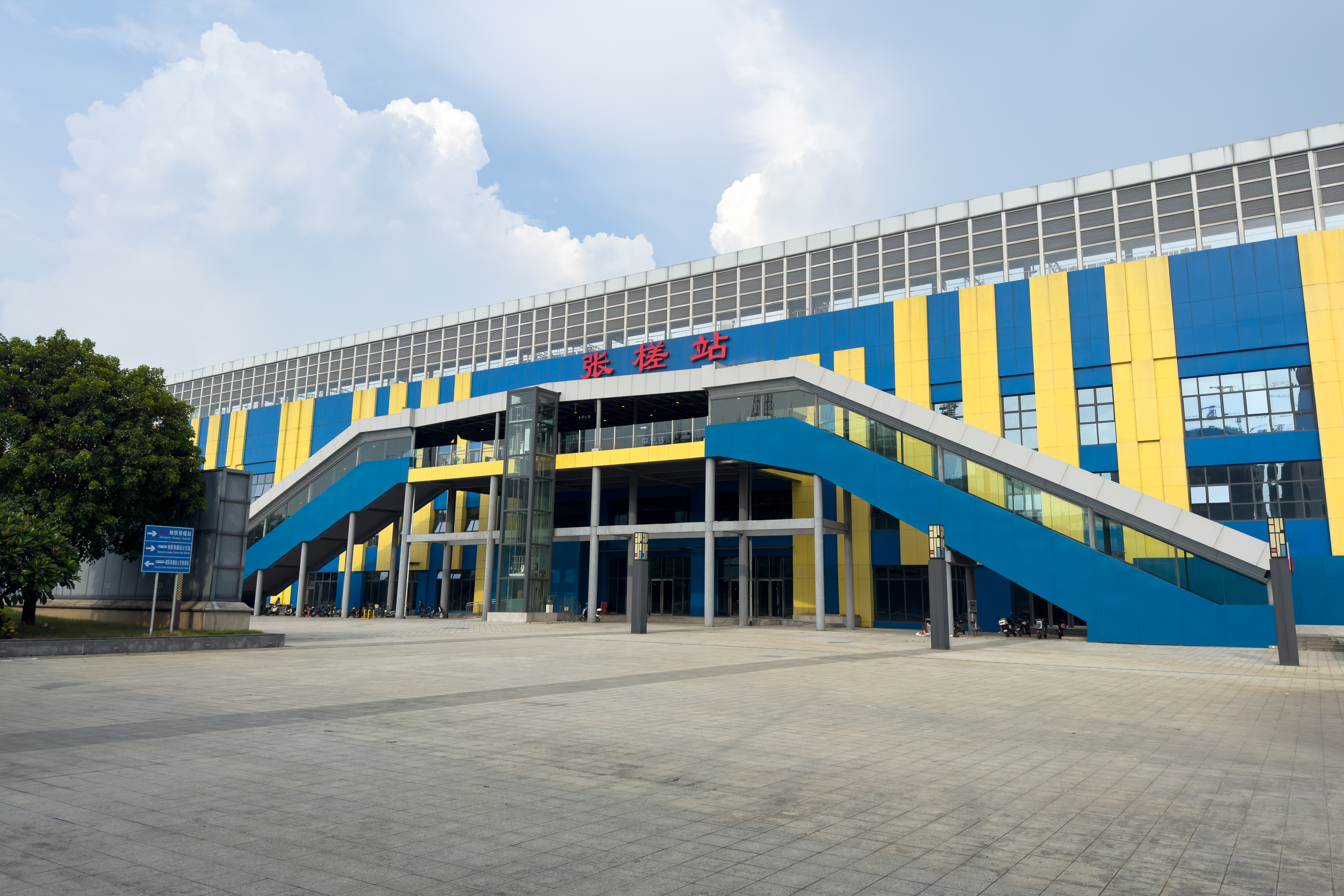
- West side of the station building

Chinese name
- Simplified Chinese: 张槎站
- Traditional Chinese: 張槎站
Transcriptions
Standard Mandarin
- Hanyu Pinyin: Zhāngchá Zhàn
Yue: Cantonese
- Yale Romanization: Jēungchàh Jaahm
- Jyutping: Zoeng^{1}caa^{4} Zaam^{6}

General information
- Location: Southeast of the intersection of Jihua 2nd Road (季华二路) and Chanxi Boulevard (禅西大道), Zhangcha Subdistrict; Chancheng District, Foshan, Guangdong; China
- Coordinates: 23°0′42.08″N 113°3′44.68″E
- Owner: Pearl River Delta Metropolitan Region intercity railway
- Operator: Guangdong Intercity
- Lines: Guangzhou–Foshan circular intercity railway (Southern Ring section); Guangzhou–Zhaoqing intercity railway
- Platforms: 2 (2 side platforms)
- Tracks: 2
- Connections: 2 Zhangcha

Construction
- Structure type: Elevated
- Accessible: Yes

Other information
- Station code: ZAA (Pinyin: ZCH)

History
- Opened: 26 May 2024 (2 years ago)

Services
Preceding station	Pearl River Delta Metropolitan Region Intercity Railway	Following station
Foshan West towards Zhaoqing	Guangzhou–Zhaoqing intercity railway	Shunde North towards Panyu
Transfer at Zhangcha
Preceding station	Foshan Metro	Following station
Zhihui Xincheng towards Nanzhuang	Line 2 transfer at Zhangcha	Shiwan towards Guangzhou South Railway Station
Location

Zhangcha railway station (Chinese: 张槎站; pinyin: Zhāngchá Zhàn; Cantonese Yale: Jēungchàh Jaahm) is a railway station in Shunde District, Foshan, Guangdong, China. The station opened on 26 May 2024, and is operated by Guangdong Intercity Railway Operation Co., Ltd.

== Features ==
The exterior façade of the station is designed with keyboard elements, and the interior ceiling is shaped with lion scales, showing the regional characteristics of Chancheng.

== Interchanges ==
The station connects to Zhangcha, a nearby metro station of the same name served by Line 2 of Foshan Metro. There is a transfer passageway connecting the two stations, which is not yet in operation, so passengers need to do an out-of-station interchange (OSI).

== Exits ==
The station has 3 points of entry/exit, currently only 2 (Exits B1 & B2) are open. Both exits are accessible via elevators.

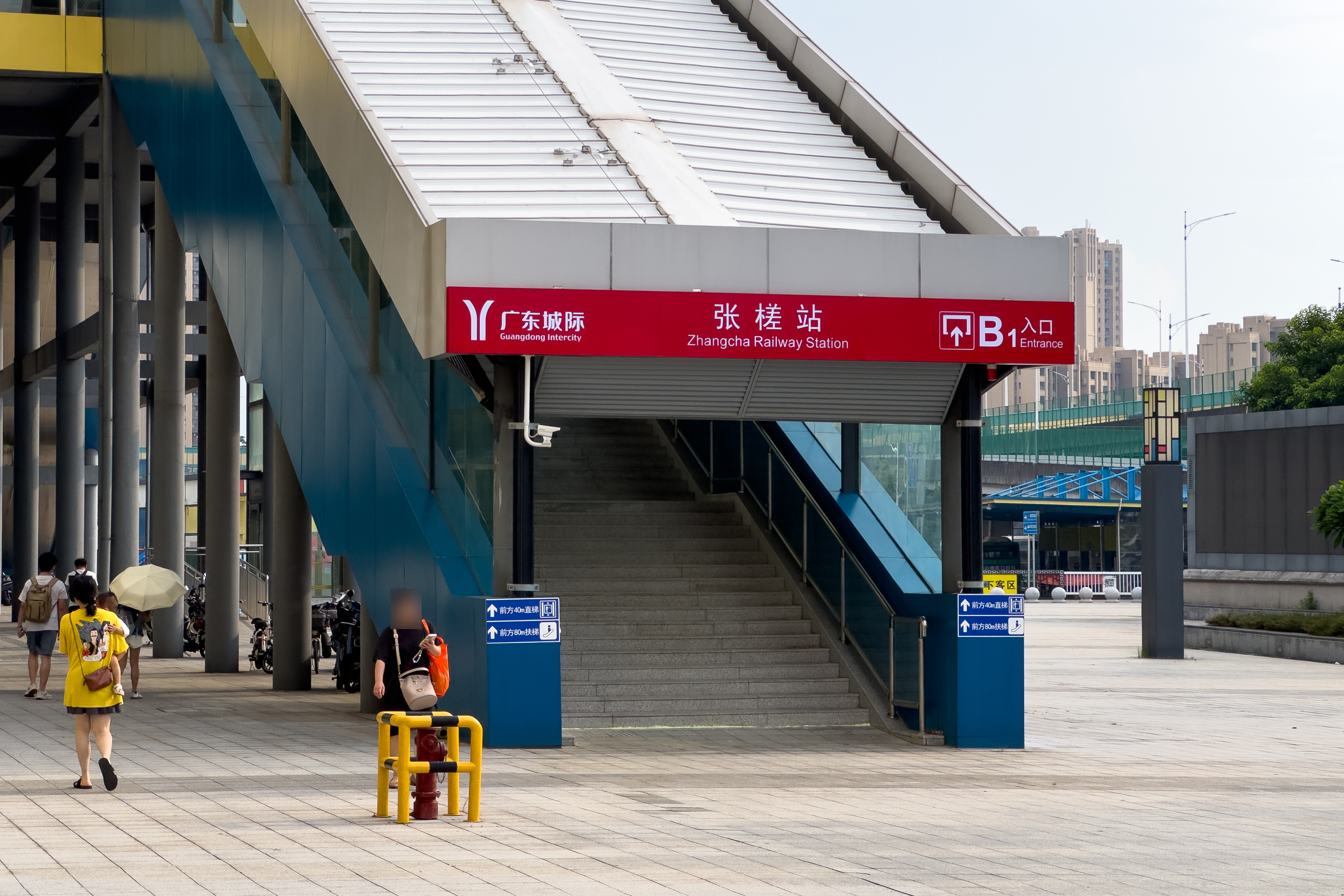
Entrance B1

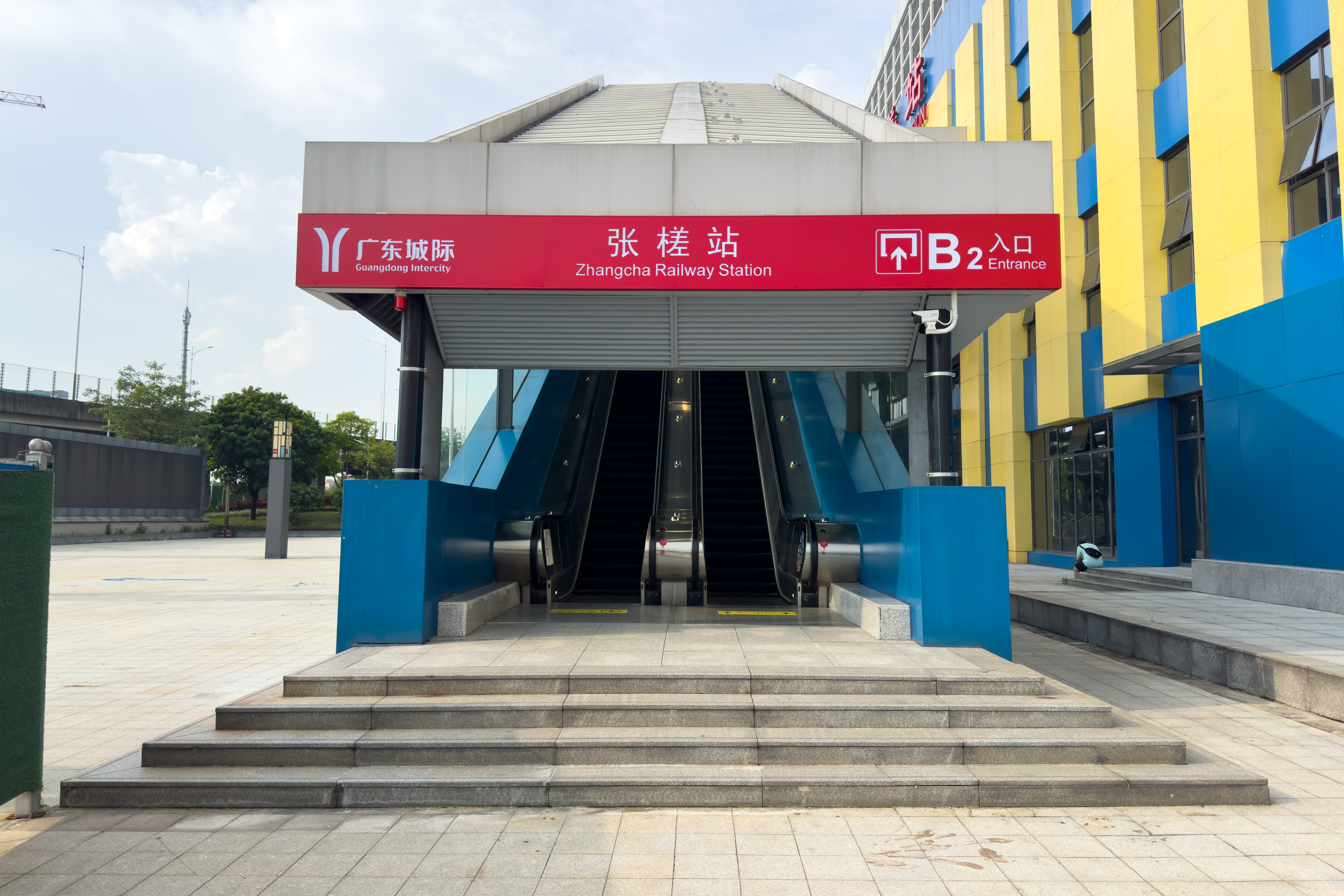
Entrance B2

== Gallery ==
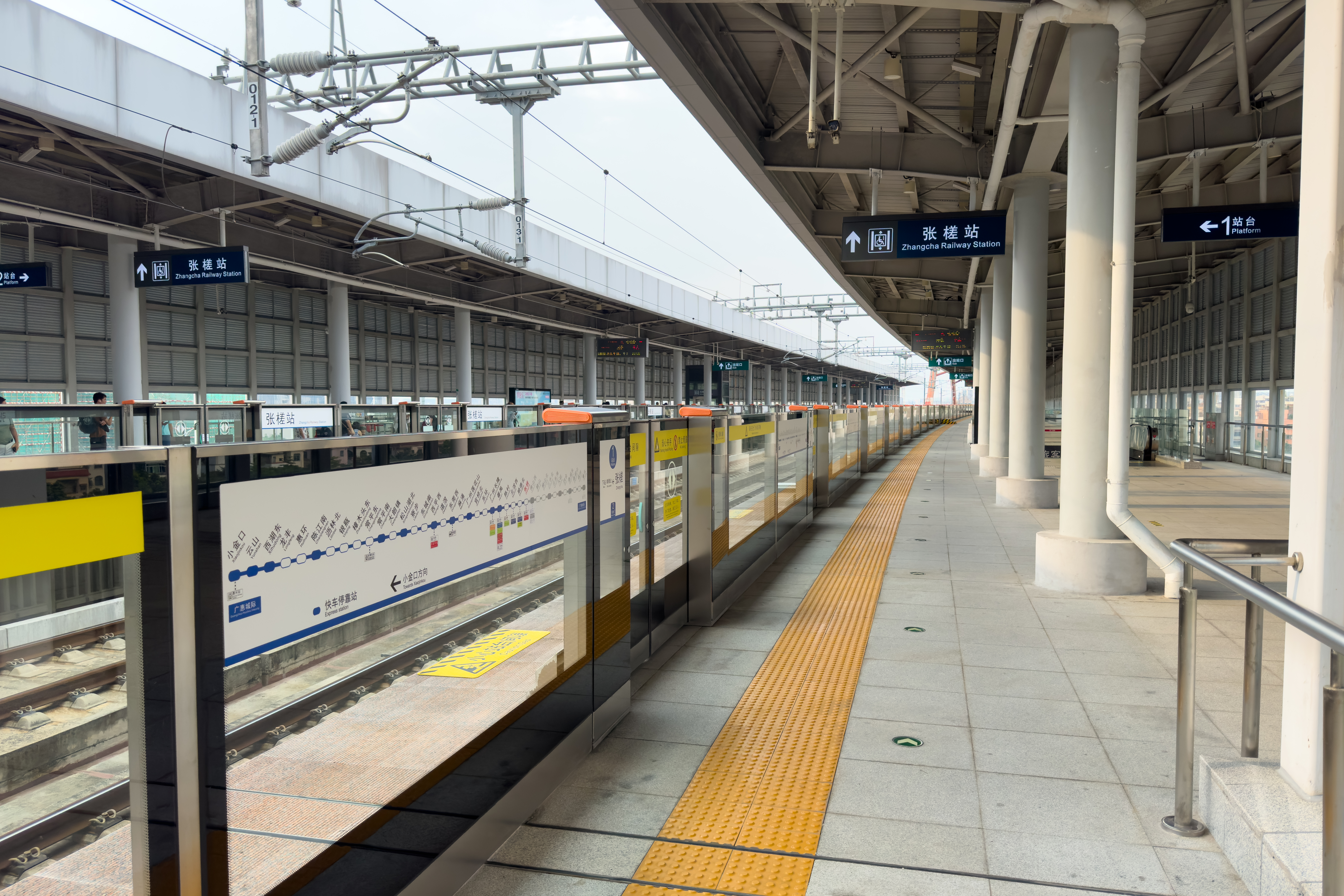
Platform 1

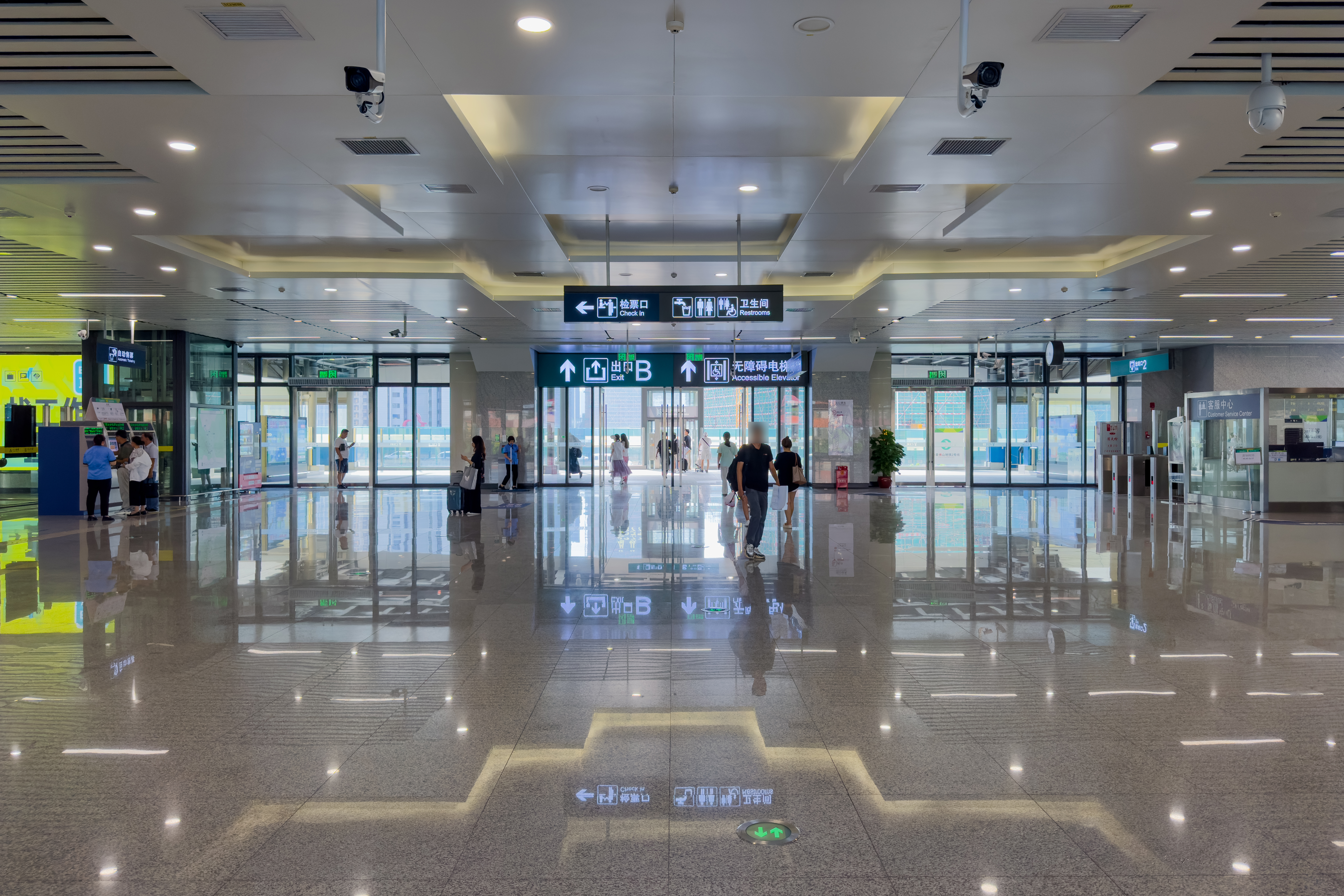
Concourse
