= Eileen Yin-Fei Lo =

American chef (1937–2022)

Eileen Yin-Fei Lo (May 4, 1937 – November 13, 2022) was a chef. She authored eleven cookbooks on Chinese cuisine.

== Early life and education ==
=== China ===
Lo was born in Shun Tak, a district of Guangdong, China. At the age of five, she began to cook which was encouraged by her parents, particularly her mother who believed that "children should know how to do everything", and a father who had traveled widely and was familiar with foreign cuisines. Early influences also included her grandmother who instilled in her the techniques and culture of cooking while she was still a child.

=== Hong Kong ===
In 1950, Lo fled the Chinese Communist Revolution to live with relatives in Hong Kong. While there she learned English and further enhanced her knowledge of cooking by researching cuisines from all of the regions of China and taking lessons from an aunt who was herself a highly accomplished cook.

== Career ==
=== United States ===
After moving to the United States, she was urged by friends to teach Chinese cookery which she began to do in the early 1970s. For many years she taught in her home, from beginners to master classes. In 1976, she was invited to join the cooking and nutrition staff of the China Institute in New York City and taught there for more than twenty years. She has also taught Chinese cookery at The New School University in New York City.

== Personal life and death ==
In 1959, Lo married Fred Ferretti, an American journalist she met in Hong Kong while he was on assignment for the military newspaper, Stars and Stripes. She moved with him to the United States, initially living in Queens, New York.

Lo died on November 13, 2022, in Montclair, New Jersey. She was survived by her son, Stephen Ferretti.

== Published cookbooks ==
- Mastering the Art of Chinese Cooking
- The Dim Sum Book: Classic Recipes from the Chinese Teahouse
- The Chinese Banquet Cookbook
- Eileen Yin-Fei Lo’s New Cantonese Cooking
- From the Earth: Chinese Vegetarian Cooking
- The Dim Sum Dumpling Book
- The Chinese Way: Healthy Low-Fat Cooking from China’s Regions
- The Chinese Kitchen
- The Chinese Chicken Cookbook
- My Grandmother’s Chinese Kitchen
- China’s Food, with Lionel Tiger (A photographic study and survey of great Chinese regional cooking)

== Awards ==
- Mastering The Art of Chinese Cooking was a winner of the International Association of Culinary Professionals (IACP) Julia Child Award and nominated for The James Beard Award
- The Chinese Banquet Book Cookbook was an IACP Julia Child Award winner
- The Dim Sum Book was nominated for an IACP Julia Child Award
- From the Earth: Chinese Vegetarian Cooking was nominated for an IACP Julia Child Award and The James Beard Award

== Honors ==
- Silver Spoon Award - Food Arts magazine (New York, 2007)
- Lifetime Achievement Award - La Celebration Culinaire Internationale (Washington D.C., 2001)
- Lifetime Achievement Award - New World Festival of Food and Wine (Singapore, China 1998)
- James Beard House Dinner - 'Little Dishes East and West' (New York, 1998)
- James Beard Awards – One of a group of chefs to cook for the James Beard Awards 10th Anniversary Gala (New York, 1996)

== Organizations ==
Lo has been associated with the following organizations over her career:

- Food Arts (New York), Asian food authority
- Les Dames d’Escoffier (New York), Member
- China Institute (New York), cooking instructor
- New School Culinary Arts (New York), cooking instructor

== Newspaper and magazine articles ==
Lo has written on both food and restaurants for:

- The New York Times
- The New York Times Magazine
- Gourmet magazine
- Food & Wine
- Travel + Leisure
- Food Arts (master class article contributor)

== Media appearances and cooking demonstrations ==
Lo has appeared on Martha Stewart Living (syndicated), The Early Show (CBS), Good Morning America (ABC), Today in New York (WNBC), Fox and Family (FOX) and on Food Network, as well as regional U.S. programs and programs in Singapore, the United Kingdom, Italy, Finland, Canada and New Zealand.
