= Gu Chujun =

Chinese convicted criminal and former business executive

Gu Chujun (Chinese: 顾雏军) is a Chinese convicted criminal and former business executive and entrepreneur. He is a native of Yangzhou, Jiangsu Province.

He studied at Tianjin University and became the Chief Executive Officer of Greencool Holdings in Hong Kong and the Kelon Group.

He acquired Hisense Kelon, Meiling Electrical Appliance, Jinnuoer, Qihuawa, Xiling, Yanxing Bus and Xiang Bearing. In 2001, Forbes magazine ranked him as China's 20th richest man.

As an outcome of the Lang–Gu dispute, in January 2008, Gu was sentenced to 10 years in prison and a fine of 6.8 million yuan after a conviction for falsifying corporate reports. An appeal against the conviction was rejected in April 2009. Hisense Kelon also won damages of 30.15 million yuan in a civil case against Gu.
