= Leliu Subdistrict =

Leliu Subdistrict 勒流街道
- Subdistrict
- Location within Guangdong
- Coordinates: 22°51′22″N 113°07′56″E
- Country: People's Republic of China
- Province: Guangdong
- Prefecture-level city: Foshan
- District: Shunde

Area
  - Total: 90.84 km^{2} (35.07 sq mi)
- Elevation: 5 m (16 ft)

Population
  - Total: 220,000
  - Density: 2,400/km^{2} (6,300/sq mi)
- Time zone: UTC+8 (China Standard)
- Postal code: 440606004
- Area code: 0757

Leliu Subdistrict (Chinese: 勒流街道; pinyin: Lèliú Jiēdào; Jyutping: lak^{6}lau^{4} gaai^{1}dou^{6}) is a subdistrict of Shunde District, Foshan, Guangdong, China. It lies in central of Shunde, with a resident population of 120,000 with its total area of 92 square kilometres.

== Link ==
- Official site of Leliu Government (Chinese Version)
