= Shunfengshan Park =

Park in Foshan, China

Coordinates: 22.827182°N 113.277611°E

- 顺峰山公园
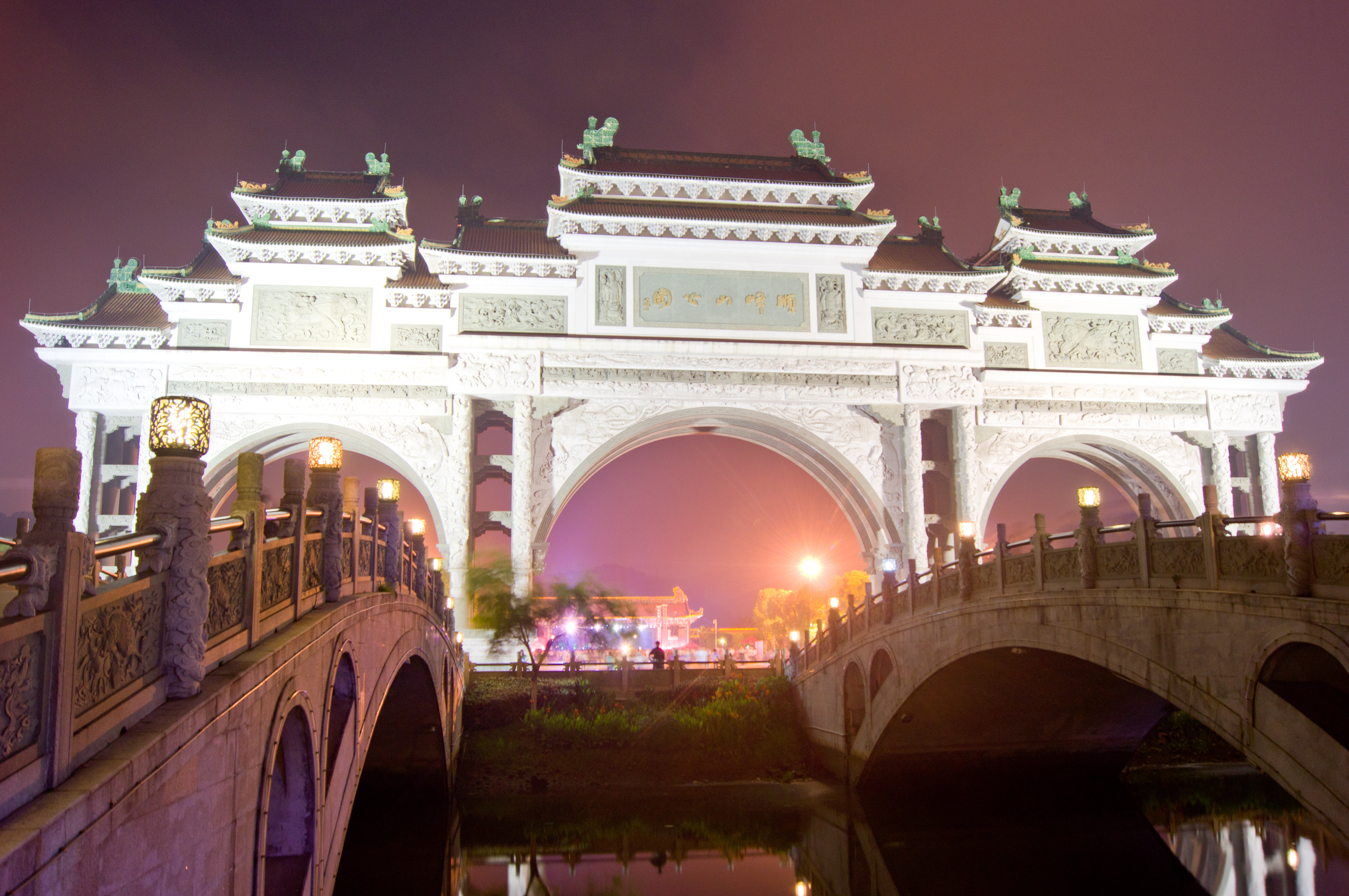
- Shunfengshan Park at night
- Interactive map of Shunfengshan Park
- Location: Foshan City, Guangdong Province, China
- Area: 8.209 hectares (20.28 acres)

Shunfengshan Park (Chinese: 顺峰山公园; pinyin: shùnfēngshān gōngyuán), located at the foot of Taiping Mountain in Shunde District, Foshan City, is one of the "Ten Attractions of Shunde". It was built between 1999 and 2002, and was opened to public on October 24, 2004.

== Notable places ==
The paifang inside is the symbol of the park. It's called China's No.1 Paifang because of its massive size. The paifang is 37.6 meters high and 88 meters wide, decorated with engravings of dragons, lions, birds and gods.
