= Midea Group =

Chinese home appliance manufacturer and air conditioner OEM

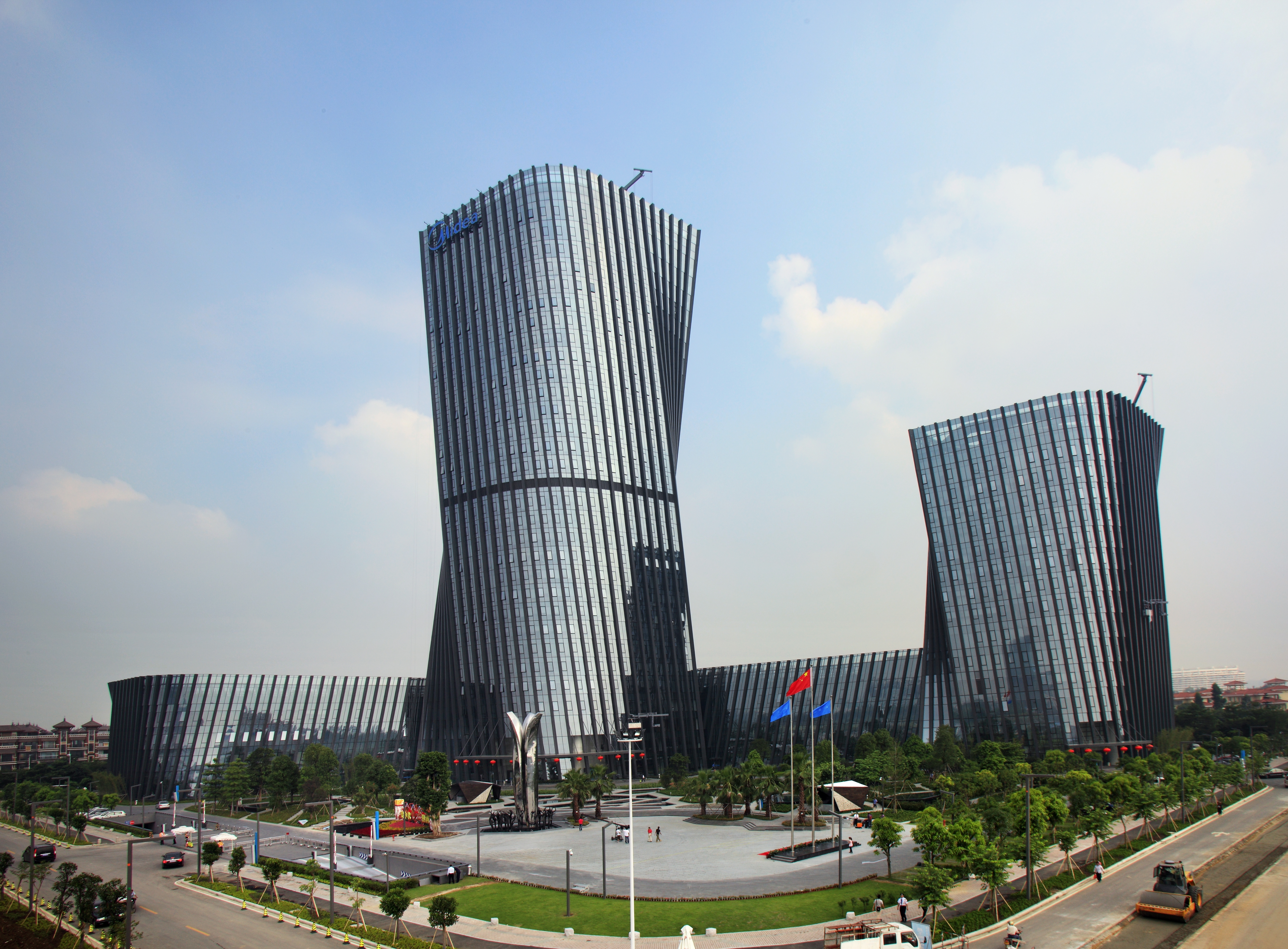
- Headquarters in Beijiao
- Type: Public
- Traded as: SZSE: 000333; SEHK: 300; CSI A50
- ISIN: CNE100001QQ5
- Industry: Home appliance; Electrical devices
- Founded: 1968; 58 years ago
- Founder: He Xiangjian
- Headquarters: Beijiao, Shunde District, Foshan city, Guangdong province, China
- Key people: Paul Fang (chairman)
- Products: Major appliances; Small appliances
- Revenue: ▲CN¥458.5 billion (2025) (US$68.44 billion)
- Operating income: ▲CN¥54.74 billion (2025) (US$8.17 billion)
- Net income: ▲CN¥44.52 billion (2025) (US$6.65 billion)
- Total assets: ▲CN¥608.79 billion (2025) (US$90.88 billion)
- Total equity: ▲CN¥236.42 billion (2025) (US$35.29 billion)
- Owner: He Xiangjian (via Chinese: 美的控股; lit. 'Midea Holding'; 31.51%)
- Number of employees: 198,050 (2026)
Subsidiaries
GD Midea	(100%)
KUKA	(100%)
Eureka

Chinese name
- Simplified Chinese: 美的集团
- Traditional Chinese: 美的集團
- Literal meaning: Midea Group
Transcriptions
Standard Mandarin
- Hanyu Pinyin: Měidì jítuán
Yue: Cantonese
- Yale Romanization: Méihdīk jaahptyùhn
- Jyutping: Mei5dik1 zaap6tyun4

Midea Group Co., Ltd.
- Simplified Chinese: 美的集团股份有限公司
- Traditional Chinese: 美的集團股份有限公司
- Literal meaning: Midea Group, Company Limited by Shares
Transcriptions
Standard Mandarin
- Hanyu Pinyin: Měidí jítuán gǔfèn yǒuxiàn gōngsī
Yue: Cantonese
- Yale Romanization: Méihdīk jaahptyùhn gúfán yáauhhaahn gūngsī
- Jyutping: Mei5dik1 zaap6tyun4 gu2faan2 jau5haan6 gung1si1
- Website: www.midea.com

Midea Group (Chinese: 美的集团; pinyin: Měidì Jítuán; Jyutping: mei5 dik1 zaap6 tyun4) is a Chinese electrical appliance manufacturer, headquartered in Beijiao town, Shunde District, Foshan, Guangdong and listed on Shenzhen Stock Exchange since 2013. As of 2021, the firm employed approximately 150,000 people in China and overseas with 200 subsidiaries and over 60 overseas branches. It has been listed on the Fortune Global 500 since July 2016. Midea produces lighting, water appliances, floor care, small kitchen appliances, laundry, large cooking appliances, and refrigeration appliances. It is the largest microwave oven manufacturer, and acts as an OEM for many brands. It also has a long history in producing home and commercial products in heating, ventilation and air conditioning (HVAC). In 2017 it was reportedly the world's largest producer of industrial robots and appliances.

The group declared sales revenue of US$40.5 billion for the 2020 financial year and is listed on the main board of the Shenzhen Stock Exchange.

== History ==
In 1968, He Xiangjian (Chinese: 何享健) founded the company, which produced bottle lids in Beijiao.

After its initial period of manufacturing bottle lids and car parts, the company focused on the manufacture of fully finished goods; specifically, electric fans beginning in 1980. Five years later, Midea produced its first air conditioner, a product which remains the core component of Midea's business today. Over the following 15 years though, the company gradually expanded into a wide variety of other electrical home appliances, including refrigerators, washing machines, and microwave ovens.

In 1973, the subsidiary handling the core businesses of the company, known as "Guangdong Midea Electric", proceeded with a public offering of shares on the Shenzhen Stock Exchange. Guangdong Midea Electric's parent company, known today as "Midea Group", remained a privately held company at that time.

Midea opened its first overseas production facilities in 2007, in the Vietnam Industrial Park outside of Ho Chi Minh City. This would mark the beginning of a period of international expansion for the company. In 2008, Midea formed a manufacturing joint venture with Belarusian microwave producer Horizont, in order to break into the various CIS markets.

2010 would see the first of several overseas joint ventures between Midea and American air-conditioner manufacturer Carrier Corporation. Their first joint venture is based in Cairo, Egypt, under the name of Miraco Carrier. The next year, Midea and Carrier continued on this course, forming a collection of closely networked joint venture companies in Brazil, Argentina and Chile, and another one separately in India.

In August 2012, the board of Midea Group announced that the company's founder, He Xiangjian, had resigned as Chairman. Guangdong Midea Electric Chairman and President Paul Fang was named as the new Chairman of Midea Group.

A restructuring plan was announced in April 2013. In September 2013, the whole entity was publicly listed in the Shenzhen Stock Exchange as Midea Group. At the same time, Guangdong Midea Electric was privatized by Midea Group.

At the end of 2014, the Chinese electronics giant Xiaomi invested CN¥1.2 billion by acquiring 1.2% shares of Midea Group. A cooperation between the two companies was also announced at the same time.

In 2016, Midea made three major acquisitions, the first of which was Toshiba's home appliances business for US$477 million, followed by the even larger purchase of KUKA, the German robotics company. Lastly, acquiring Eureka, the brand that specializes in floorcare, from Electrolux AB in December.

In 2017, Midea became embroiled in a controversy involving millions of defective air conditioner/humidifier units made for many US brands. The incident involved lawsuits and allegations from US consumers that the company failed to honor its replacement obligations involving a recall it had issued.

In December 2018, Midea Group established its semiconductor subsidiary MR Semi Co. Ltd.

In 2022, the company launched its first major U.S. advertising campaign. The humorous campaign starred actor Sam Richardson of HBO's Veep as a fictional Chief Idea Officer who takes credit for all Midea products, calling them "My Ideas" and claiming to be "the man behind the best ideas, at the world's best appliance company."

In 2024, a sponsorship deal was struck between Midea and Sevilla FC. It will last until 2026.

== Products ==
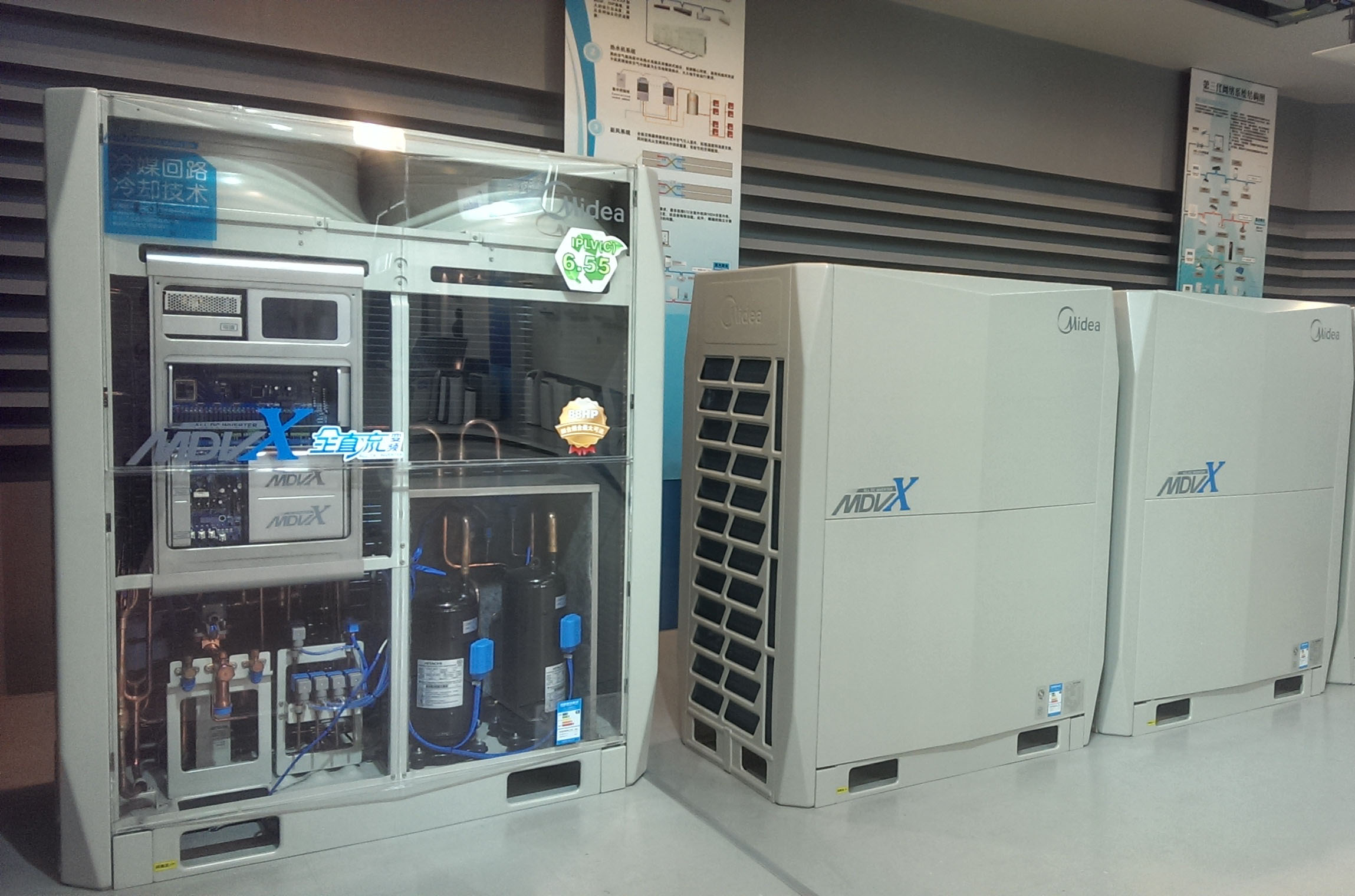
Midea's MDV-X VRF air conditioner

Midea's main business is producing home appliances and commercial air conditioners; air conditioners accounted for CNY161.1 billion in 2023, over $20b USD, with other appliances accounting for CNY134.7 billion.

It sells products domestically under its own name, while the majority of its export business is as an OEM and ODM for many well-known global brands. In the 2010s, Midea launched its own brand in a growing number of foreign markets, such as Brazil, Argentina, Chile, India, Egypt, and most countries in Southeast Asia.

The company's main product category is air conditioners, both residential and commercial. It manufactures other major home appliances such as refrigerators, washing machines, and dishwashers. Midea also offers a wide range of smaller appliances, such as microwave ovens, kettles, water dispensers, and vacuum cleaners. It offers these products under its own brand, and manufactures them for sale under other brands (as an OEM), for example many microwaves are made by Midea, are internally similar but are sold under a multitude of different brands, with varying external designs. The same is true for some HVAC products such as air conditioners and dehumidifiers.

Beyond Midea's eponymous brand name, the company also employs a series of other brands. The Little Swan brand was adopted when Midea acquired the Little Swan company in 2008. Little Swan products are mostly laundry and refrigeration appliances. Hualing is a brand used by Midea for air conditioners and refrigerators, and was also adopted in 2008. MDV is one of the brands used by Midea for its line of commercial air conditioners, active since 1999. The Pelonis brand is used for heaters. Midea is also involved in manufacturing automotive parts — including electric water pumps, oil pumps, compressors and power steering motors — through its Welling subsidiary.

In 2021, The New York Times reported that most countertop microwave ovens sold in the United States for under $100 were produced by Midea or Galanz, including ovens sold by major brands such as Toshiba, Whirlpool, and Black+Decker.

== Competitors ==
In 2020, major manufacturing competitors in China included Haier and Gree Electric Appliances; these top 3 comprised 80% of the sales of China's top 10. Samsung is another major competitor, especially for large appliances.

For home appliances, Haier was estimated to be the largest by revenue in 2022 at $35 billion.
