= Zhangcha station (Foshan Metro) =

Foshan Metro Line 2 station

Zhangcha 张槎
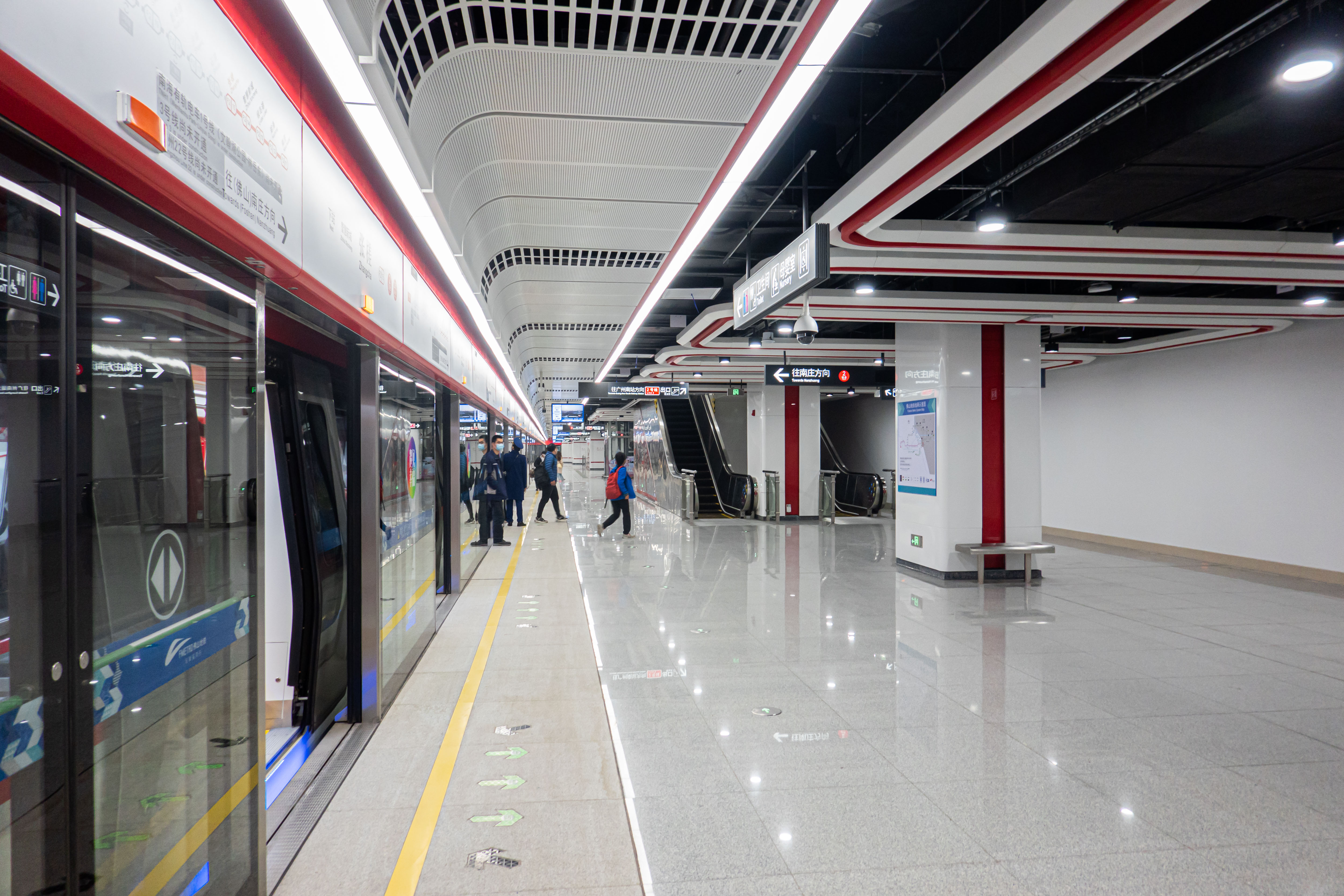
- Platform 2 (towards Nanzhuang)

Chinese name
- Simplified Chinese: 张槎站
- Traditional Chinese: 張槎站
Transcriptions
Standard Mandarin
- Hanyu Pinyin: Zhāngchá Zhàn
Yue: Cantonese
- Yale Romanization: Jēungchàh Jaahm
- Jyutping: Zoeng^{1}caa^{4} Zaam^{6}

General information
- Location: Intersection of Jihua 2nd Road (季华二路) and Chanxi Boulevard (禅西大道), Zhangcha Subdistrict; Chancheng District, Foshan, Guangdong; China
- Coordinates: 23°0′49.22″N 113°3′44.85″E
- Operator: Foshan Metro Operation Co., Ltd.
- Line: Line 2
- Platforms: 4 (2 island platforms)
- Tracks: 2
- Connections: Zhangcha

Construction
- Structure type: Underground
- Accessible: Yes

Other information
- Station code: F215

History
- Opened: 28 December 2021 (4 years ago)

Services
Preceding station	Foshan Metro	Following station
Zhihui Xincheng towards Nanzhuang	Line 2	Shiwan towards Guangzhou South Railway Station
Transfer at Zhangcha
Preceding station	Pearl River Delta Metropolitan Region Intercity Railway	Following station
Foshan West towards Zhaoqing	Guangzhou–Zhaoqing intercity railway transfer at Zhangcha	Shunde North towards Panyu
Location

Zhangcha station (simplified Chinese: 张槎站; traditional Chinese: 張槎站; pinyin: Zhāngchá Zhàn; Cantonese Yale: Jēungchàh Jaahm) is a station on Line 2 of Foshan Metro, located in Foshan's Chancheng District. It opened on 28 December 2021.

There is an interchange channel connecting to Zhangcha railway station on the concourse level of the station, where passengers can take the Guangzhou–Zhaoqing intercity railway.

== Station layout ==
The station has 2 island platforms under Jihua 2nd Road, the inner tracks for Line 2, the outer tracks reserved for a future cross-platform interchange with Line 4.

G	-	Exits A-D
L1; Concourse	Lobby	Ticket Machines, Customer Service, Shops, Police Station, Security Facilities; Transfer passageway to Zhangcha railway station
L2; Platforms		4 reserved platform
L2; Platforms	Island platform, doors will open on the right
L2; Platforms	Platform 2	2 towards Nanzhuang (Zhihui Xincheng)
L2; Platforms	Platform 1	2 towards Guangzhou South Railway Station (Shiwan)
L2; Platforms	Island platform, doors will open on the right
L2; Platforms		4 reserved platform

=== Entrances/exits ===
The station has 4 points of entry/exit. Exit B is equipped with an elevator.

- A: Jihua 2nd Road
- B: Jihua 2nd Road, Zhangcha railway station
- C: Jihua 2nd Road
- D: Jihua 2nd Road
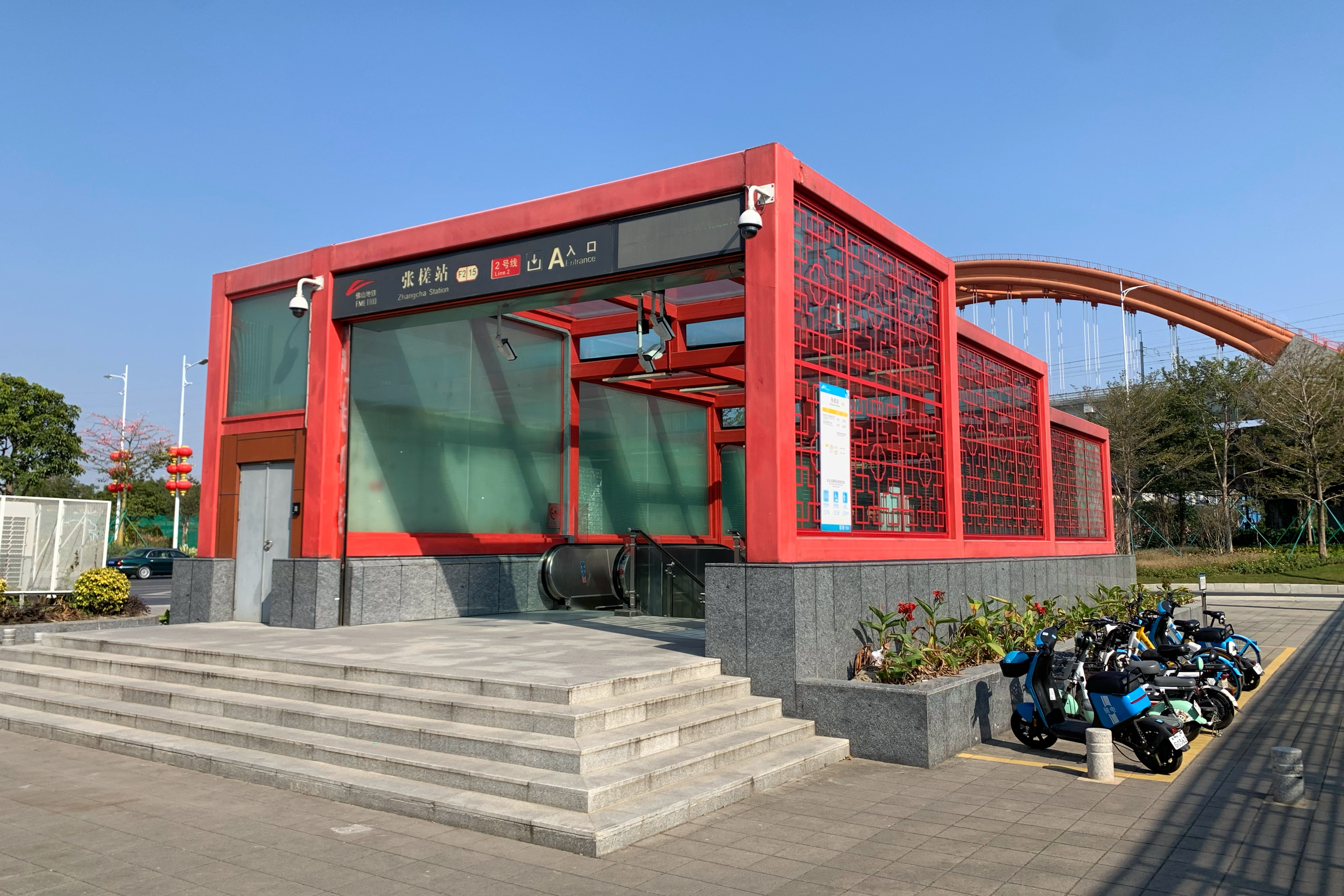
Entrance A

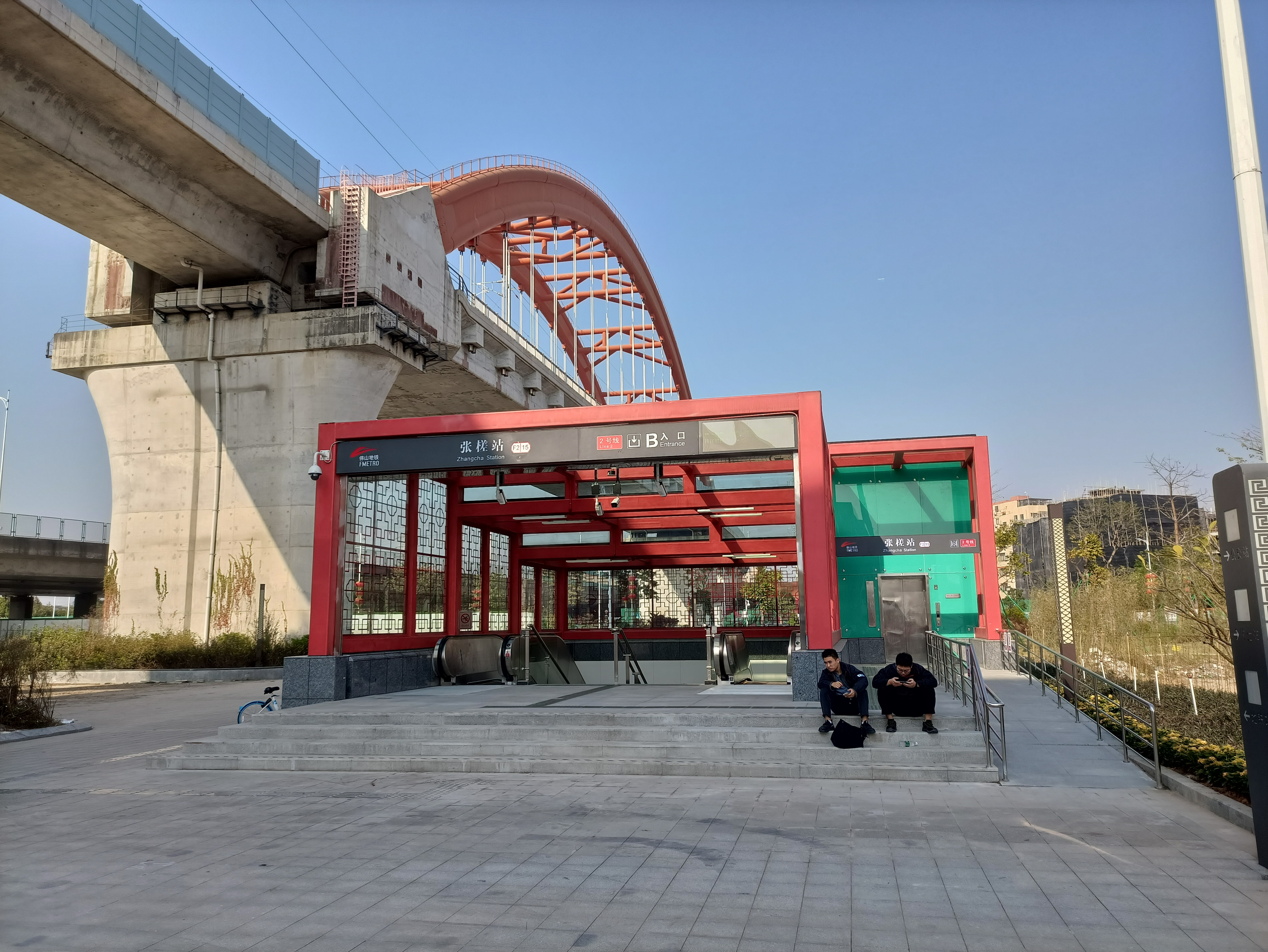
Entrance B

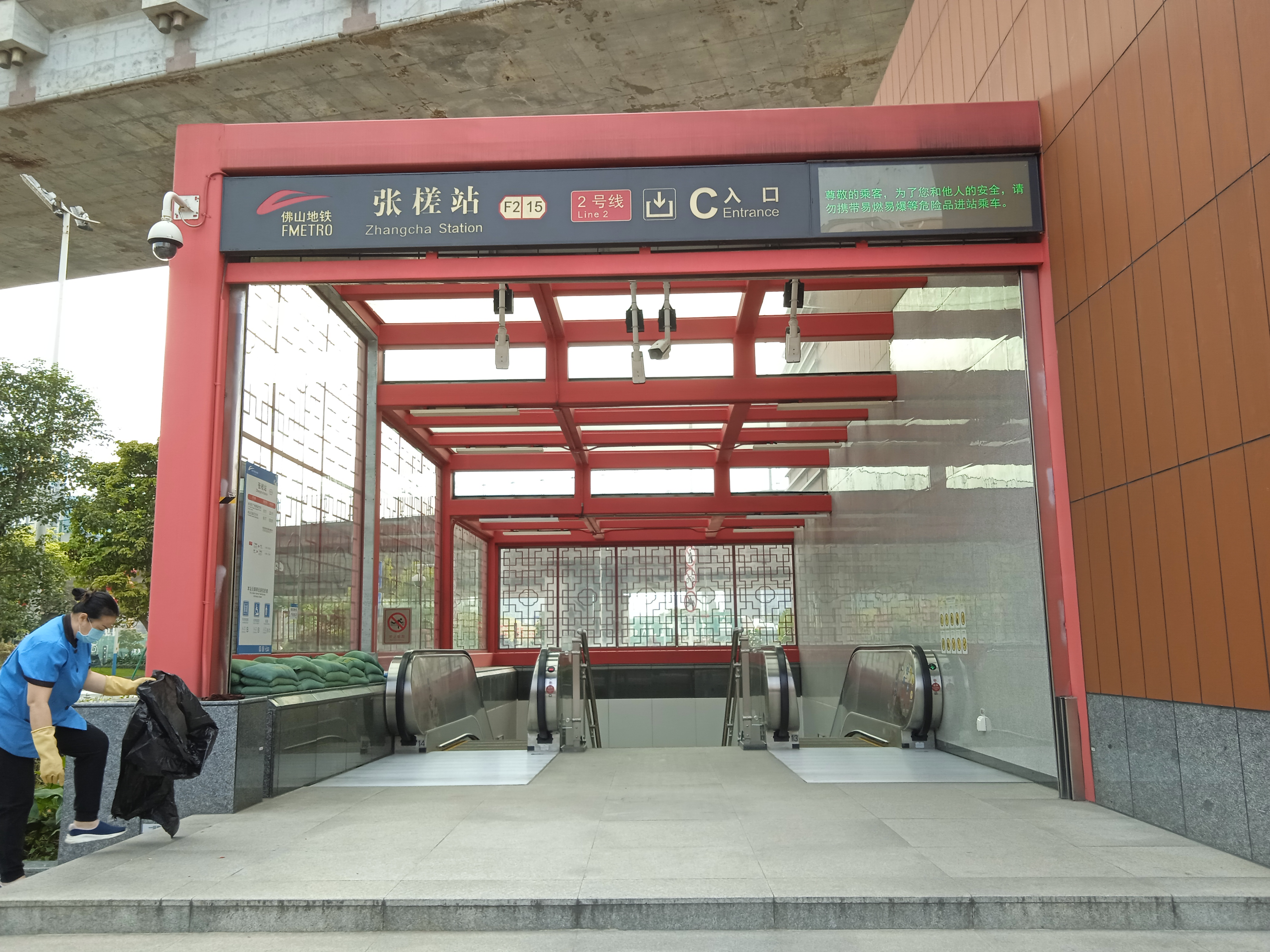
Entrance C

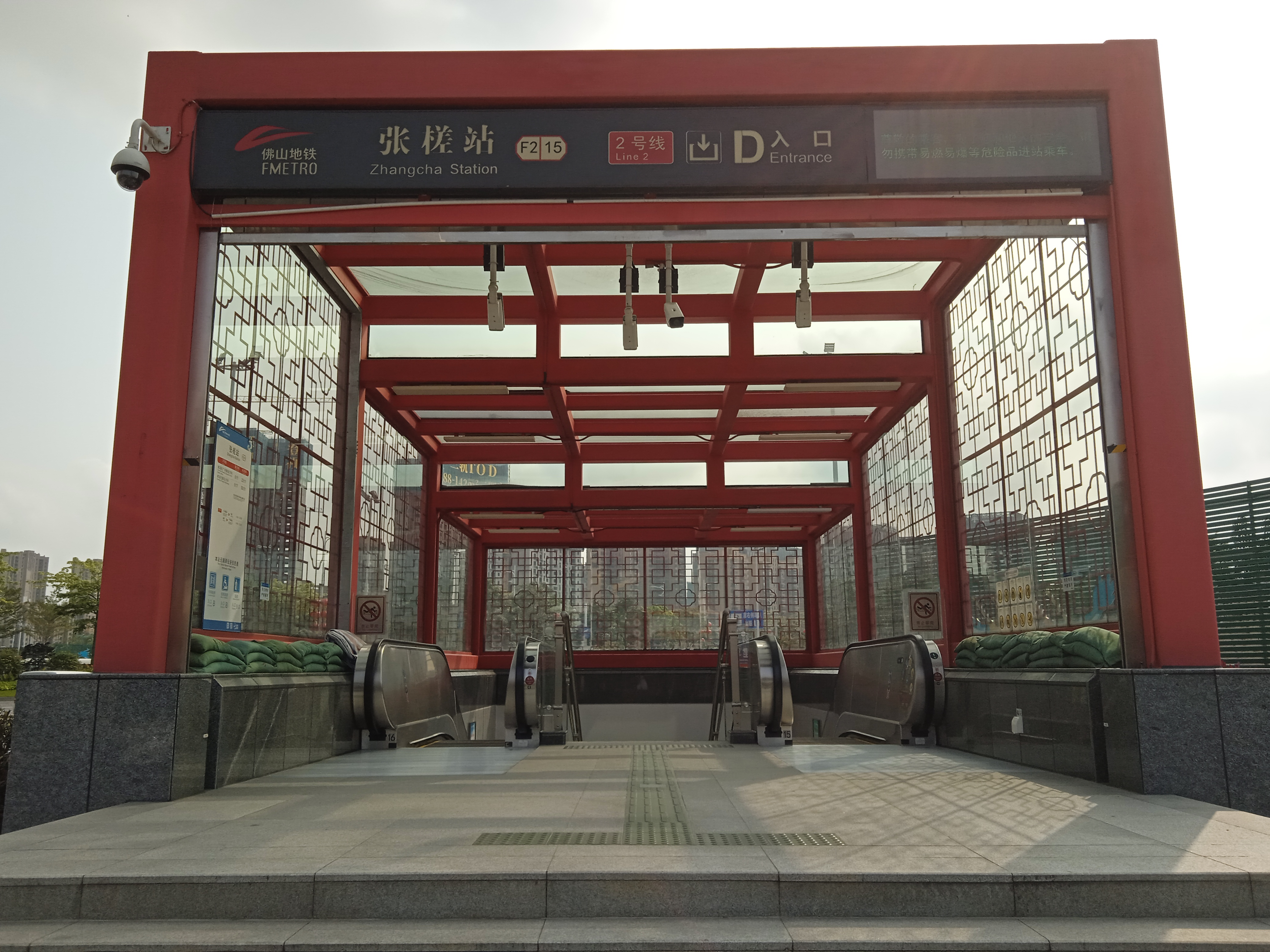
Entrance D

== Gallery ==
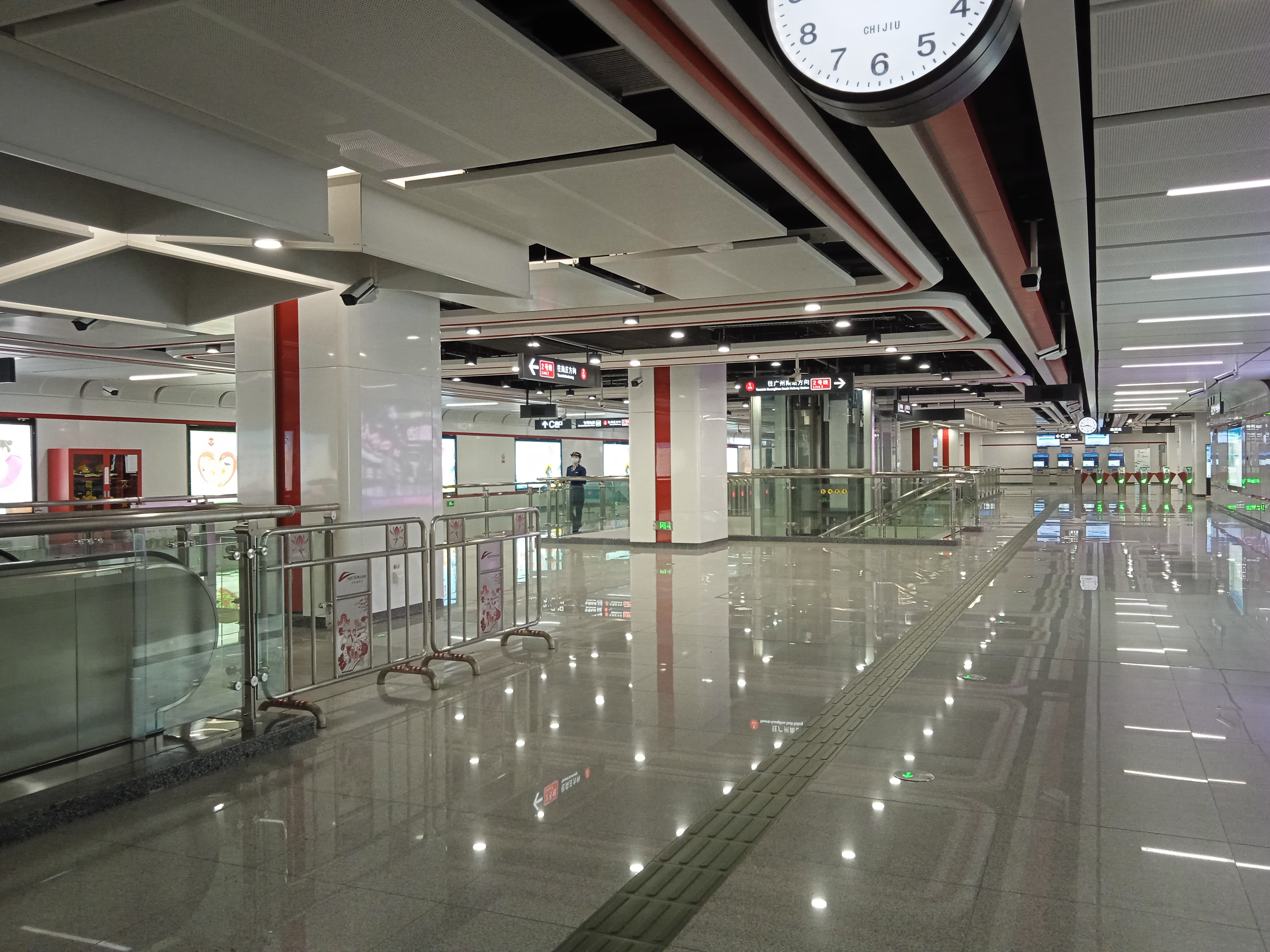
Concourse

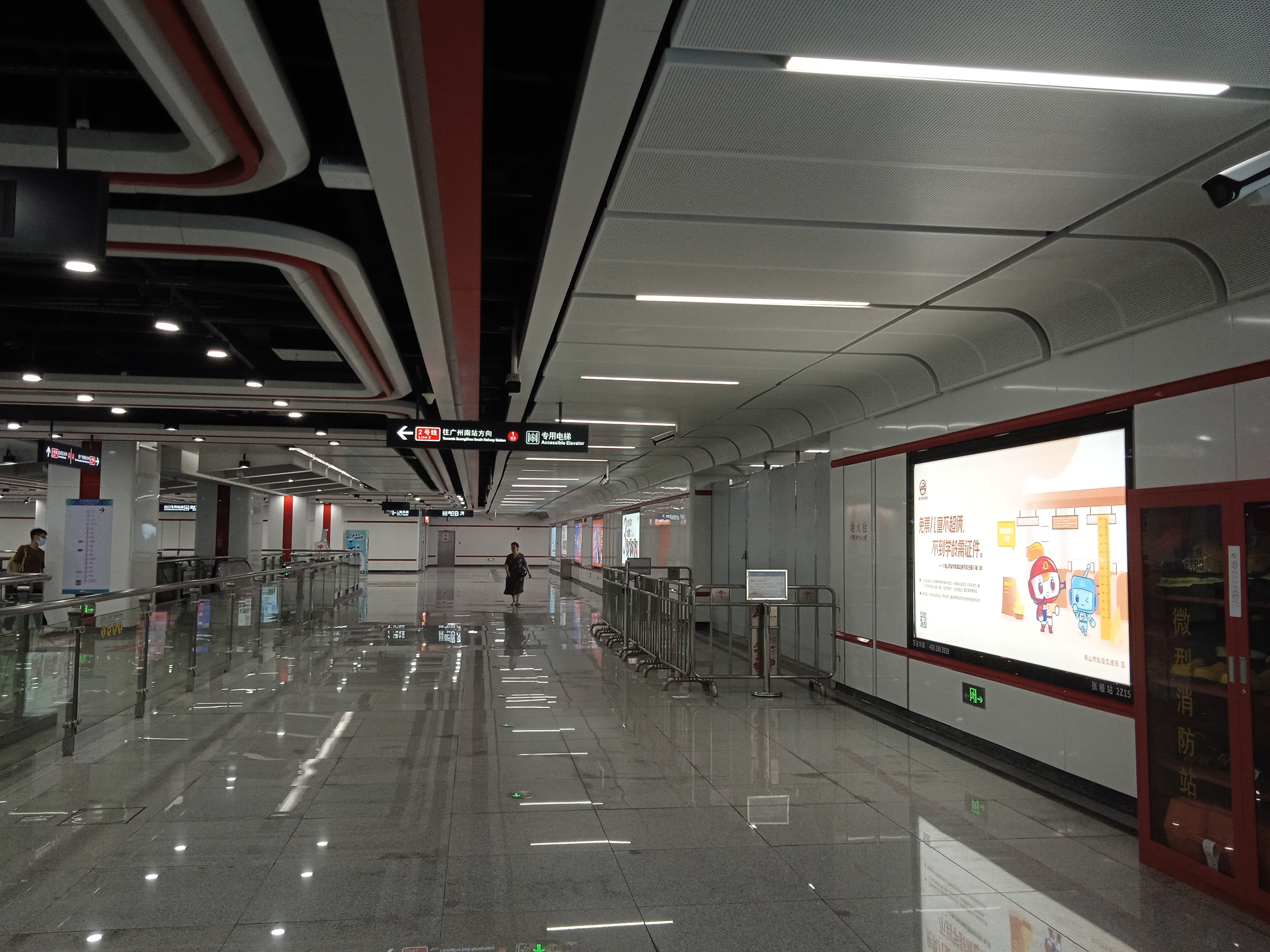
Non-paid Area Transfer passageway to Zhangcha railway station
