= Jun'an, Guangdong =

Town in Foshan, China

Coordinates: 22°42′N 113°09′E

Jun'an (simplified Chinese: 均安镇; traditional Chinese: 均安鎮; pinyin: Jūn'ān Zhèn) is a town in Shunde District, Foshan prefecture-level city, Guangdong Province, China. It is known for its denim industry, which began in the early 1980s.

Martial artist Bruce Lee's father Lee Hoi-chuen was born in Jun'an, and so his ancestral roots can be traced back to Jun'an. There is a street in the village named after Bruce Lee where his ancestral home is situated. The home is open for public access. There is also a theme park built after Bruce Lee.
