= Hisense Kelon =

Chinese household appliance manufacturer

- Native name: 海信科龙电器股份有限公司
- Type: Public
- Traded as: SZSE: 000921; SEHK: 921
- Industry: White goods manufacturing
- Founded: 1984; 42 years ago
- Headquarters: Shunde, Foshan, Guangdong, People's Republic of China
- Area served: People's Republic of China
- Key people: Chairman: Mr. Tang Yeguo; General manager: Mr. Wang Shilei
- Products: Household appliances
- Parent: Hisense Group
- Website: www.kelon.com

Hisense Kelon, doing business as Kelon (stylized in all uppercase in its logo) and formerly known as Guangdong Kelon Electrical Holdings Company Limited, is one of the largest Chinese manufacturers of white goods, producing refrigerators, air conditioners, and small electric appliances. The company is well known in mainland China under its brand names Kelon (科龙) and Ronshen (容声). The company's head office is located in Shunde, Foshan, Guangdong.

== History ==
Founded in 1984 in Shunde, an industrial county in Guangdong, Kelon began producing refrigerators. Its H shares were listed on the Hong Kong Stock Exchange in 1996, while A shares were listed on the Shenzhen Stock Exchange in 1999.

In 2006, Hisense Group, another large-scale white goods manufacturer in Qingdao, Shandong, acquired Kelon and became its largest shareholder. In 2007, the company name was changed to Hisense Kelon Electrical Holdings Limited following the acquisition.

== Renaming ==
In October 2018, Kelon proposed changes to the company's Chinese and English names. The proposed name would alter the name from "Hisense Kelon Electrical Holdings Company Limited" to "Hisense Home Appliances Group Co., Ltd."

== Trading suspension ==
On June 16, 2005, Kelon announced that trading in its H shares was suspended "pending the release of an announcement in relation to price sensitive information". This was due to the involvement of Kelon's former chairman and largest shareholder, Gu Chujun, in the misappropriation of company assets, which was being investigated by the Foshan police. Gu was later dismissed by Kelon's board. The case was settled by the Intermediate People's Court of Foshan City on 9 January 2009. H shares resumed trading on 21 January 2009.

== See also ==
- Amana Corporation
- BELIMO Holding AG
