= Galanz =

Chinese manufacturer of electronic home appliances

Guangdong Galanz Enterprises Co., Ltd.
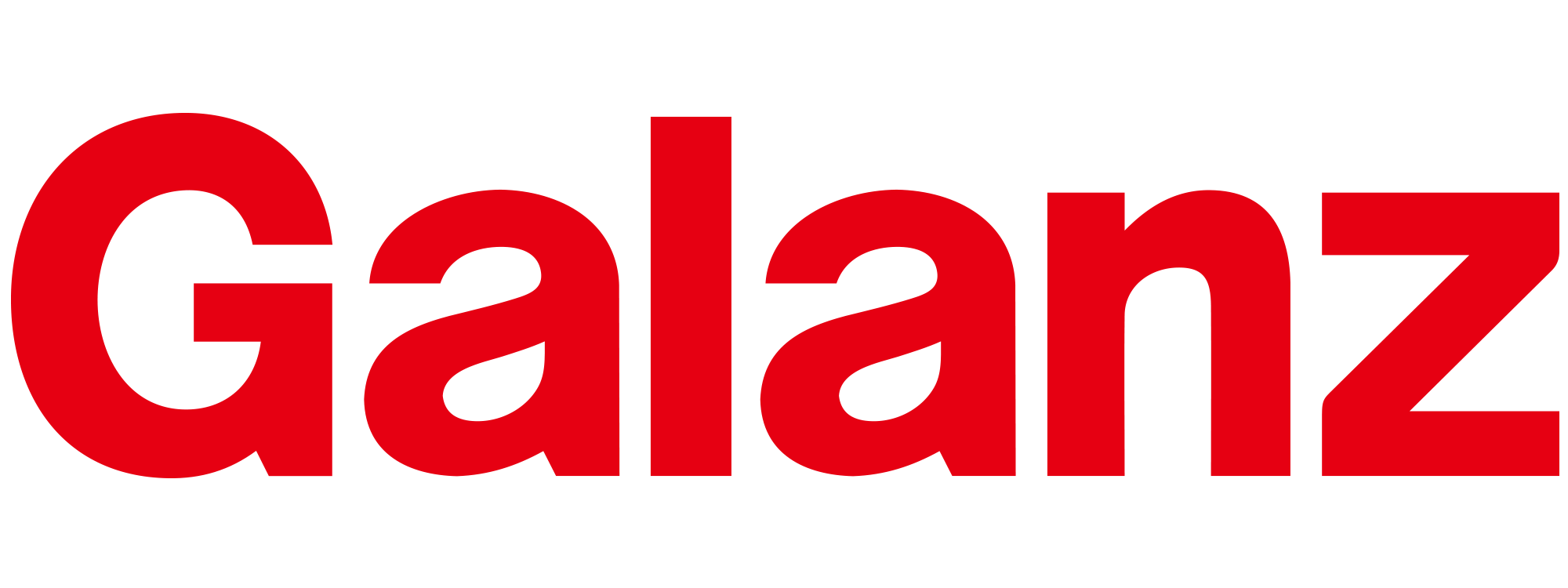

- Industry: Home Appliances
- Founded: 1978; 48 years ago
- Founder: Liang Qingde
- Headquarters: Shunde, Foshan, Guangdong, China
- Key people: Liang Zhaoxian
- Website: www.galanz.com

Guangdong Galanz Enterprises Co., Ltd. (Chinese: 格兰仕; pinyin: Gélánshì) is a manufacturer of electronic home appliances, headquartered in Foshan, Guangdong and founded on 28 September 1978. As of January 2019, Galanz manufactures about half of the world's microwaves.

Over the years, Galanz has expanded its product line to include air conditioners, washing machines, toaster ovens, refrigerators and other home appliances. The company currently has production bases in Zhongshan City and Shunde District of Foshan City and employs over 50,000 people which cover 13 subsidiaries in headquarter, 52 sales offices across China and branches in Hong Kong, Japan, Korea, Europe and North America.

== History ==
Founded in 1978 by Liang Qingde, Galanz was originally a company that dealt in the trading of duck feathers.

In 1992, Galanz entered the home appliance industry, letting microwave ovens enter Chinese daily life.

In 1993, Galanz trial-produced 10,000 microwave ovens.

In 1995, Galanz ranked first in the Chinese microwave oven market with a market share of 25.1%.

In 1998, Galanz became the world's largest microwave oven manufacturer with 40% global market share.

In 1999, Galanz's production and sales exceeded 6 million units.

In 2000, Galanz entered the air conditioning and refrigeration industry.

In 2001, Galanz's global production and sales soared to 12 million units.

In 2002, Galanz entered into electric oven industry.

In 2007, Galanz began to introduce refrigerator, washing machine, dryer and dish washer products in global market. At the same year, Galanz entered into central air-conditioning industry.

In 2009, Galanz became the No.1 exporter of toaster ovens.

In 2014, ChinaDaily ranked Galanz #8 of the top ten home appliance makers in China.

From 2015, Galanz started to build fully automatic production lines.

On September 28, 2019, Galanz launched first IoT appliance chip-"BF-Xijiao", becoming a home appliance enterprise achieving reverse customized exclusive chips.

In 2020, the first phase of Galanz's Industry 4.0 production base in the Shunde District of Foshan began operations.

Galanz sued Alibaba in 2020, alleging that Alibaba abused its market position by forcing Galanz to pick sides when choosing where to sell goods online. A settlement was reached and the case was withdrawn from the courts.

In 2021, Galanz completed its offer for Whirlpool (China) and became the controlling shareholder of it.

On the evening of May 29, 2021, the world's first aerospace microwave oven developed by Galanz was sent into space.
