= Shunde, Guangdong =

Shunde 顺德区 Shuntak; Shunte
- District
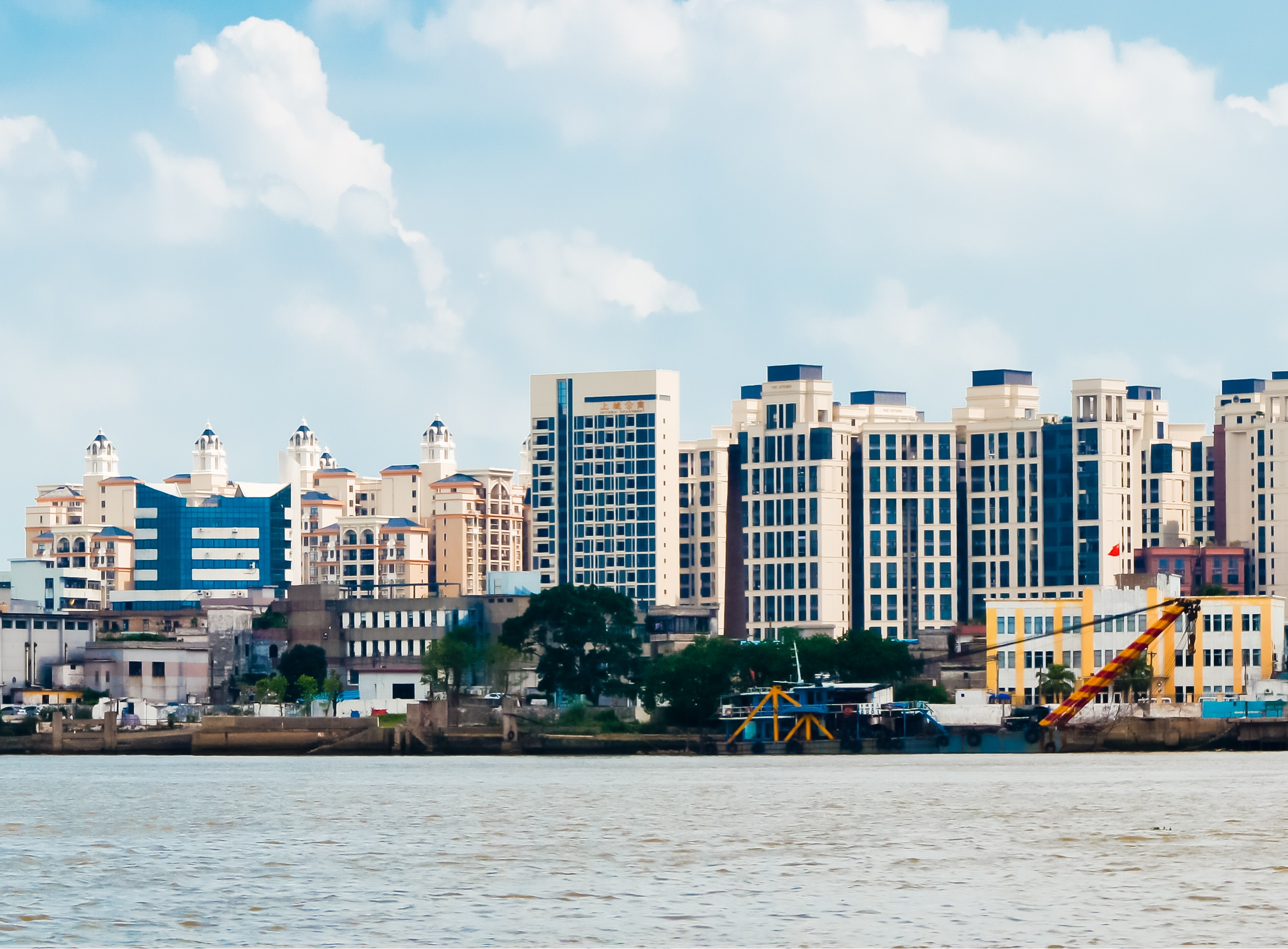
- Ronggui Subdistrict in Shunde
- Coordinates: 22°50′11″N 113°15′09″E
- Country: China
- Province: Guangdong
- Prefecture-level city: Foshan

Area
  - Total: 806 km^{2} (311 sq mi)

Population (2020)
  - Total: 3,229,090
  - Density: 4,010/km^{2} (10,400/sq mi)
- Time zone: UTC+8 (China Standard)
- Postal code: 528300
- Website: (in Chinese) www.shunde.gov.cn

Shunde, Guangdong
- Simplified Chinese: 顺德区
- Traditional Chinese: 順德區
- Jyutping: seon6 dak1 keoi1
- Cantonese Yale: Seuhndāk Kēui
- Hanyu Pinyin: Shùndé Qū
Transcriptions
Standard Mandarin
- Hanyu Pinyin: Shùndé Qū
- Wade–Giles: shun^{4}te^{2}qu^{1}
Yue: Cantonese
- Yale Romanization: Seuhndāk Kēui
- Jyutping: seon6 dak1 keoi1

Alternative Chinese name
- Simplified Chinese: 顺德
- Traditional Chinese: 順德
- Jyutping: seon6 dak1
- Cantonese Yale: Seuhndāk
- Hanyu Pinyin: Shùndé
- Postal: Shuntak
Transcriptions
Standard Mandarin
- Hanyu Pinyin: Shùndé
- Wade–Giles: shun^{4}te^{2}
Yue: Cantonese
- Yale Romanization: Seuhndāk
- Jyutping: seon6 dak1

Shunde or Shun Tak (from Cantonese) is a district in the city of Foshan, Guangdong, located in the Pearl River Delta of China. It had a population of 2,464,784 as of the 2010 census. Once a traditional agricultural county, it has become one of the most affluent counties in Guangdong and mainland China. Since 2009, Shunde has been administered independently of Foshan city. It is directly accountable to the Guangdong provincial government.

== History ==
According to archaeological discoveries, human settlements appeared during the Spring and Autumn period. In the third year of Jingtai era (1452 AD), after the Ming dynasty suppressed the rebellion led by Huang Xiao Yang (黃蕭養), Shunde county was formally established. Before that, this area was part of Nam Hoi county (Nanhai Xian) and Sun Hui county (Xinhui Xian).

The people of Daliang subdistrict of Shunde have a long history of consuming water buffalo cheese and milk products (particularly double skin milk dessert), which is why the township had begun promoting itself as the "Township of Milk and Honey".

Shunde was a center for the development of the mulberry and sericulture industry in Guangdong province during the late Ming dynasty and early Qing dynasty. It was at this time that the Comb Sister culture emerged from Shunde in opposition to the strict patriarchal feudal system, allowing unmarried women to live financially independent with the social pressure of marriage lifted. After the fall of the Qing dynasty in 1911, the feudal system and the silk production industry collapsed, ending the local Comb Sister custom.

The first outbreak of the 2002–2004 SARS outbreak was recorded in Shunde on 16 November 2002.

== Administration divisions ==
Shunde was a county-level city until 8 December 2002, when it became a district of Foshan prefecture-level city. Shunde has direct jurisdiction over four subdistricts and six towns:

Name	Chinese (S)	Hanyu Pinyin	Population (2010)	Area (km^{2})
Daliang Subdistrict	大良街道	Dàliáng Jiēdào	404,309	80.19
Ronggui Subdistrict	容桂街道	Róngguì Jiēdào	449,687	80.17
Leliu Subdistrict	勒流街道	Lēiliú Jiēdào	252,364	90.84
Lunjiao Subdistrict	伦教街道	Lúnjiào Jiēdào	184,479	59.21
Beijiao town	北滘镇	Běijiào Zhèn	270,310	92.41
Lecong town	乐从镇	Lècóng Zhèn	259,795	77.55
Jun'an town	均安镇	Jūn'ān Zhèn	141,736	79.36
Xingtan town	杏坛镇	Xìngtán Zhèn	144,537	122.07
Chencun town	陈村镇	Chéncūn Zhèn	135,686	50.92
Longjiang town	龙江镇	Lóngjiāng Zhèn	221,881	73.78

Unique as a district of any prefecture-level city in China, Shunde has been granted a degree of prefecture-level administrative autonomy over certain matters, notably economic development, independent of Foshan city, and has been answerable directly to the Guangdong Provincial government since 2009.

== Climate ==
Climate data for Shunde, elevation 21 m (69 ft), (1991–2020 normals, extremes 1958–2023)
Month	Jan	Feb	Mar	Apr	May	Jun	Jul	Aug	Sep	Oct	Nov	Dec	Year
Record high °C (°F)	29.3 (84.7)	30.6 (87.1)	32.0 (89.6)	34.1 (93.4)	39.5 (103.1)	37.9 (100.2)	38.7 (101.7)	39.2 (102.6)	37.2 (99.0)	36.3 (97.3)	33.2 (91.8)	30 (86)	39.5 (103.1)
Mean daily maximum °C (°F)	18.7 (65.7)	20.2 (68.4)	22.7 (72.9)	27.0 (80.6)	30.6 (87.1)	32.5 (90.5)	33.8 (92.8)	33.5 (92.3)	32.3 (90.1)	29.4 (84.9)	25.3 (77.5)	20.6 (69.1)	27.2 (81.0)
Daily mean °C (°F)	14.8 (58.6)	16.3 (61.3)	19.0 (66.2)	23.2 (73.8)	26.6 (79.9)	28.5 (83.3)	29.5 (85.1)	29.3 (84.7)	28.3 (82.9)	25.6 (78.1)	21.3 (70.3)	16.6 (61.9)	23.3 (73.8)
Mean daily minimum °C (°F)	12.1 (53.8)	13.7 (56.7)	16.5 (61.7)	20.6 (69.1)	23.9 (75.0)	25.9 (78.6)	26.6 (79.9)	26.5 (79.7)	25.5 (77.9)	22.8 (73.0)	18.5 (65.3)	13.8 (56.8)	20.5 (69.0)
Record low °C (°F)	1.1 (34.0)	2.7 (36.9)	6.1 (43.0)	8.6 (47.5)	16.1 (61.0)	17.8 (64.0)	22.1 (71.8)	21.6 (70.9)	16.5 (61.7)	13.4 (56.1)	7.1 (44.8)	1.6 (34.9)	1.1 (34.0)
Average precipitation mm (inches)	48.8 (1.92)	51.0 (2.01)	83.7 (3.30)	174.0 (6.85)	279.4 (11.00)	312.8 (12.31)	220.7 (8.69)	259.6 (10.22)	197.1 (7.76)	72.7 (2.86)	36.4 (1.43)	36.4 (1.43)	1,772.6 (69.78)
Average precipitation days (≥ 0.1 mm)	7.0	9.5	13.7	14.4	17.1	18.3	16.3	16.2	12.1	5.7	5.3	5.4	141
Average relative humidity (%)	70	75	79	80	80	81	78	78	74	66	66	63	74
Mean monthly sunshine hours	117.2	89.4	73.0	87.5	128.9	153.8	208.4	192.1	179.2	191.3	164.0	154.5	1,739.3
Percentage possible sunshine	35	28	20	23	31	38	51	48	49	54	50	47	40
Source: China Meteorological AdministrationPeriod of record startall-time record low

== Economy ==
Situated in the fertile Pearl River Delta, its economy was once dominated by agriculture, fisheries and silk farming. Since the implementation of policies related to reform and openness began in 1978, the people of this area were given full control over their geographical position and culture. This has allowed Shunde to gradually develop into a modern industrial boomtown, especially the manufacturing of furniture and electric appliances. Major mainland Chinese product brands are headquartered in Shunde with major production facilities. Recently a new technology industrial park has also been opened in this area, featuring car manufacturers such as Toyota.

Major Chinese companies such as Galanz, Kelon, Country Garden and Midea, has its headquarters in Shunde District.

Shunde was approved as a pilot city for the comprehensive reform of Guangdong in 1993, and also for taking the lead in accomplishing modernization in 1999. From 2000 to 2003, Shunde was ranked first among China's top 100 counties for Basic Economic Competitiveness for four consecutive years (released by National Bureau of Statistics of China). In 2005, Shunde's GDP was 2,170 billion yuan.

Today, this area has become one of the most affluent counties in Guangdong and mainland China (according to official information from the Chinese government and the United Nations). The GDP reached 127.5 billion yuan in 2007, an annual increase of 18%, and GDP per capita reached 107,991 yuan (ca. US$14,200).

== Tourism ==
Tourist attractions include the Qinghui Garden, which features fish ponds surrounded by osmanthus, bamboo and mulberry bushes, as well as the Bruce Lee Memorial Museum located in Jun'an. Shunfengshan Park was opened to the public in 2004 and has a memorial archway which is 88 metres (289 ft) wide and 38 metres (125 ft) high. Baolin Temple is accessible through the park.

Travelling from Shunde is easy with many different options. There are ferries and buses that go directly to Hong Kong, including an option to Hong Kong International Airport. Bus tickets can be purchased at the New World Centre Hotel. Macau is easily accessible by train, taking less than an hour. Guangzhou is accessible by train, taxi or bus.

== UNESCO Creative Cities ==
China's southern city of Shunde joined the UNESCO Creative Cities Network as the city of gastronomy on Monday. Another 27 cities from 19 countries were also added to the list.

Shunde has long been widely regarded as the basis for exquisite Cantonese cuisine and the cradle of Cantonese cuisine chefs. While the cuisine of Guangzhou has been historically very minimalist in terms of flavorings, food from Shunde is known for its liberal use of ingredients such as sun dried tangerine peel and dates, resulting in simple but powerful flavors.

Launched in 2004, the UNESCO Creative Cities Network is celebrating its 10th anniversary this year. The network aims to foster international cooperation between cities committed to investing in creativity as a driver for sustainable urban development, social inclusion and enhanced cultural influence in the world.

By joining the network, cities commit to collaborate and develop partnerships with a view to promoting creativity and cultural industries, to share best practices, to strengthen participation in cultural life and to integrate culture in economic and social development plans.

The network covers seven thematic areas: craft and folk arts, design, film, gastronomy, Literature, media arts and music. It aims to promote international cooperation and encourage the sharing of experiences and resources to promote local development through culture and creativity.

With these new designations, the number of UNESCO Creative Cities Network members now totals 69.

== Population ==
According to the Sixth National Population Census in 2010, Shunde District had a total population of 2,461,701, including 1,984,989 registered residents. There were 706,870 households, with an average of 2.81 people per household. The male population stood at 1,329,396, accounting for 54 percent of the total, with a sex ratio of 117.41.

In terms of age composition, people aged 14 and below numbered 296,391, making up 12.04 percent of the population; those aged between 15 and 64 reached 2,051,665, accounting for 83.34 percent; and people aged 65 and above were 113,645, taking up 4.62 percent.

In terms of educational attainment, there were 8,786 people with college education or above and 19,984 people with senior high school education or above per 100,000 residents, and the illiteracy rate was 1.54 percent.

Compared with the Fifth National Population Census in 2000, the total population rose by 45.31 percent with an average annual growth rate of 3.81 percent. The average household size decreased by 0.67 people, and the sex ratio went up by 5.79.

The proportion of people aged 14 and below dropped by 5.3 percentage points, that of people aged 15 to 64 increased by 5.6 percentage points, and that of people aged 65 and above fell by 0.3 percentage points.

The number of people with college education or above and senior high school education or above per 100,000 residents increased by 5,547 and 5,031 respectively, while the illiteracy rate decreased by 1.53 percentage points.

Based on the results of the Seventh National Population Census taken at zero hour on November 1, 2020, the basic permanent population data of Shunde District are as follows:

Permanent Population

The permanent population of the district reached 3,229,090.

Population Growth

Compared with the figure of 2,461,701 recorded in the Sixth National Population Census, the permanent population increased by 767,389 over the past decade, representing a growth of 31.17 percent and an average annual growth rate of 2.75 percent.

Household Population

There were 1,154,560 family households and 129,680 collective households in the district. The population of family households was 2,812,637, and that of collective households was 416,453. The average size of each family household was 2.44 people, a decrease of 0.37 people compared with 2.81 people recorded in the Sixth National Population Census in 2010.

== Famous residents and people from the area ==
Martial artist Bruce Lee's ancestral roots are traced to Gwan'on (Jun'an) in Seundak (Shunde). A street in the village is named after the actor, and his ancestral home is open to the public.

Other notable figures who are natives or trace their ancestry to Shunde include:

- Ou Shizi (區適子) (1234–1324), scholar of Southern Song dynasty
- John So, former Lord Mayor of Melbourne, Australia
- Lee Shau Kee, Real estate developer, and, as of January 2025, the 85th richest person in the world
- Yang Guoqiang, Real estate developer
- Law Kar Ying, Famous actor
- Eileen Yin-Fei Lo, Chinese-American cookbook writer
- Brandon Lee, Chinese-American film actor
- Lee Heung-kam (1932–2021), Hong Kong Cantonese opera and TV actress
