= Zumiao station =

Guangfo Metro station in Foshan

Coordinates: 23°01′37″N 113°06′44″E

Zumiao 祖庙
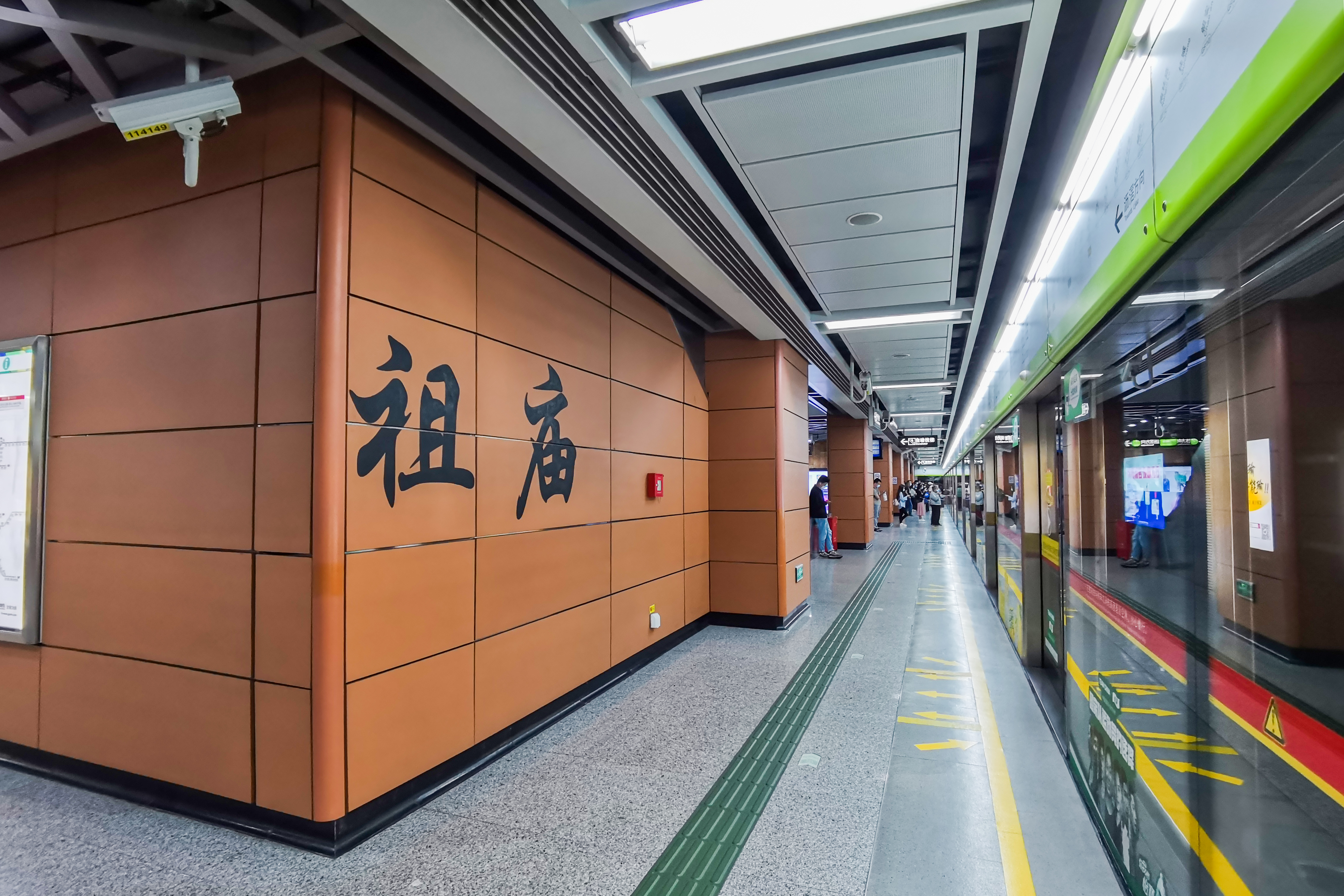

Chinese name
- Simplified Chinese: 祖庙站
- Traditional Chinese: 祖廟站
Transcriptions
Standard Mandarin
- Hanyu Pinyin: Zǔmiào Zhàn
Yue: Cantonese
- Jyutping: zou^{2}miu^{6} zaam^{6}

General information
- Location: Chancheng District, Foshan, Guangdong; China
- Operated by: Foshan Railway Investment Construction Group Co. Ltd. Guangzhou Metro Co. Ltd.
- Line(s): Guangfo line
- Platforms: 2 (1 island platform)

Construction
- Structure type: Underground

Other information
- Station code: GF08

History
- Opened: 3 November 2010; 14 years ago

Services
Preceding station	Foshan Metro	Following station
Tongji Lu towards Xincheng Dong	Guangfo Line	Pujun Beilu towards Lijiao

Zumiao Station (Chinese: 祖庙站; lit. 'Ancestral Temple Station'), is a metro station on Guangfo Line (FMetro Line 1), which will be the future interchange station between Guangfo Line and FMetro Line 5. It is located under Jianxin Road (建新路) east of its junction with Zumiao Road (祖庙路) in the Chancheng District of Foshan, near the Foshan Ancestral Temple. The station lies in the central business district of Foshan old city and was completed on 3 November 2010.

== Station layout ==
G	-	Exits
L1; Concourse	Lobby	Customer Service, Shops, Vending machines, ATMs
L2; Equipment Area	-	Station equipment
L3; Platforms	Platform 2	Guangfo towards Xincheng Dong (Tongji Lu)
L3; Platforms	Island platform, doors will open on the left
L3; Platforms	Platform 1	Guangfo towards Lijiao (Pujun Beilu)

== Exits ==
Exit number	Exit location
Exit A	Zumiao Lu
Exit B	Jianxin Lu
Exit C	Jianxin Lu
Exit D	Zumiao Lu
