= Jihua Park station =

Guangfo Metro station in Foshan

Coordinates: 23.0068°N 113.1088°E

Jihua Park 季华园
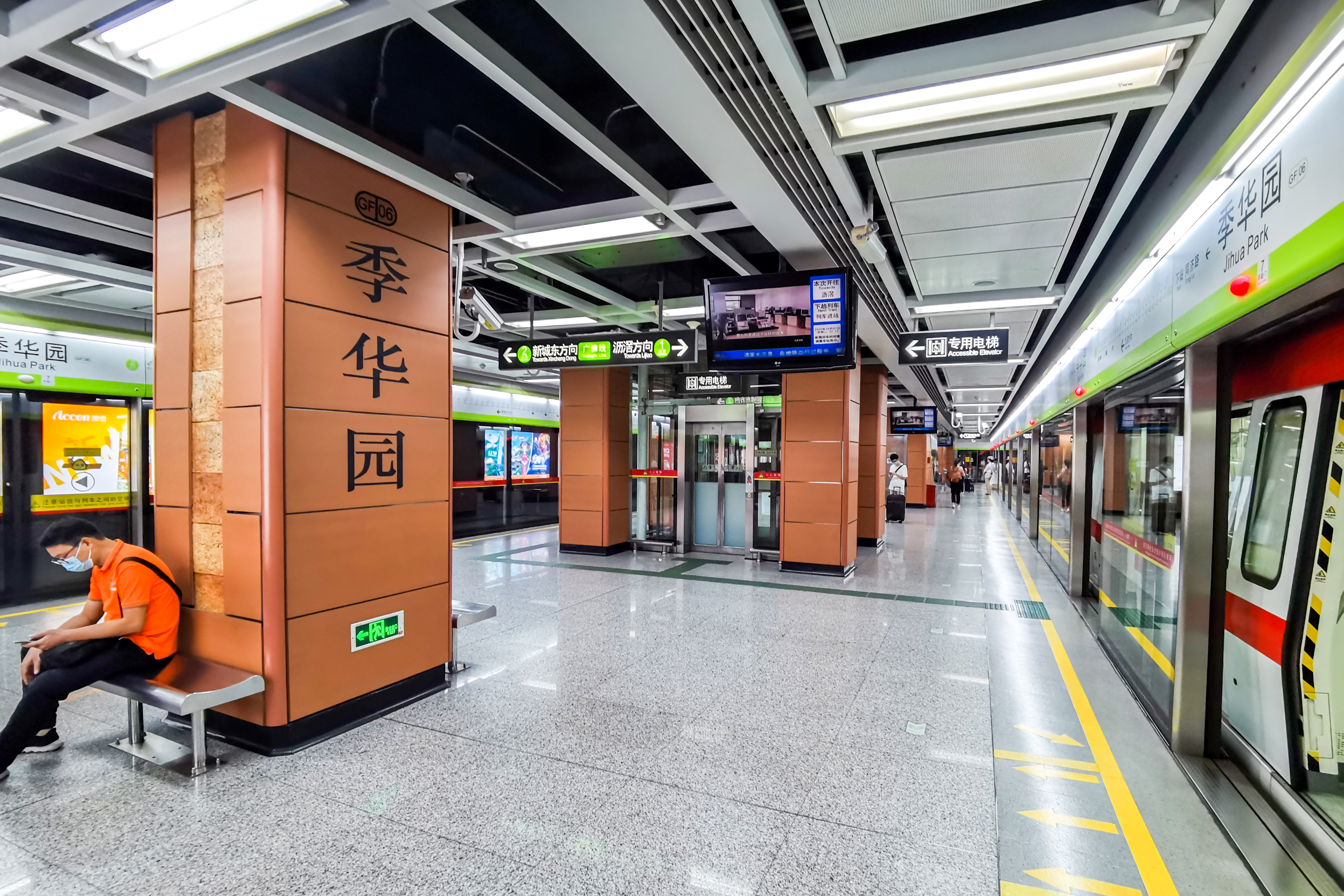

Chinese name
- Simplified Chinese: 季华园站
- Traditional Chinese: 季華園站
Transcriptions
Standard Mandarin
- Hanyu Pinyin: Jìhuá Yuán Zhàn
Yue: Cantonese
- Jyutping: gwai^{3}waa^{4} jyun^{4} zaam^{6}

General information
- Location: Chancheng District, Foshan, Guangdong; China
- Operated by: Foshan Railway Investment Construction Group Co. Ltd. Guangzhou Metro Co. Ltd.
- Line: Guangfo Line
- Platforms: 2 (1 island platform)

Construction
- Structure type: Underground

Other information
- Station code: GF06

History
- Opened: 3 November 2010; 15 years ago

Services
Preceding station	Foshan Metro	Following station
Kuiqi Lu towards Xincheng Dong	Guangfo Line	Tongji Lu towards Lijiao
Location

Jihua Park Station (Chinese: 季华园站), formerly Lujing Lu Station (绿景路站) during planning, is a metro station on the Guangfo Line (FMetro Line 1) of the Guangzhou Metro. It is also planned to be an interchange station between Guangfo Line (FMetro Line 1) and FMetro Line 4. It is located under Fenjiang South Road (汾江南路) south of its junction with Yingyin Road (影荫路) in the Chancheng District of Foshan, near Jihua Park (季华公园). The station is situated in the financial, and business centre of Foshan. It was completed on 3 November 2010.

== Station layout ==
G	-	Exits
L1; Concourse	Lobby	Customer Service, Shops, Vending machines, ATMs
L2; Platforms	Platform 2	Guangfo towards Xincheng Dong (Kuiqi Lu)
L2; Platforms	Island platform, doors will open on the left
L2; Platforms	Platform 1	Guangfo towards Lijiao (Tongji Lu)

== Exits ==
Exit number	Exit location
Exit C	Fenjiang Nanlu
Exit D	Fenjiang Nanlu
