= Pujun Beilu station =

Guangfo Metro station in Foshan

Coordinates: 23.02785°N 113.1225°E

Pujun Beilu 普君北路
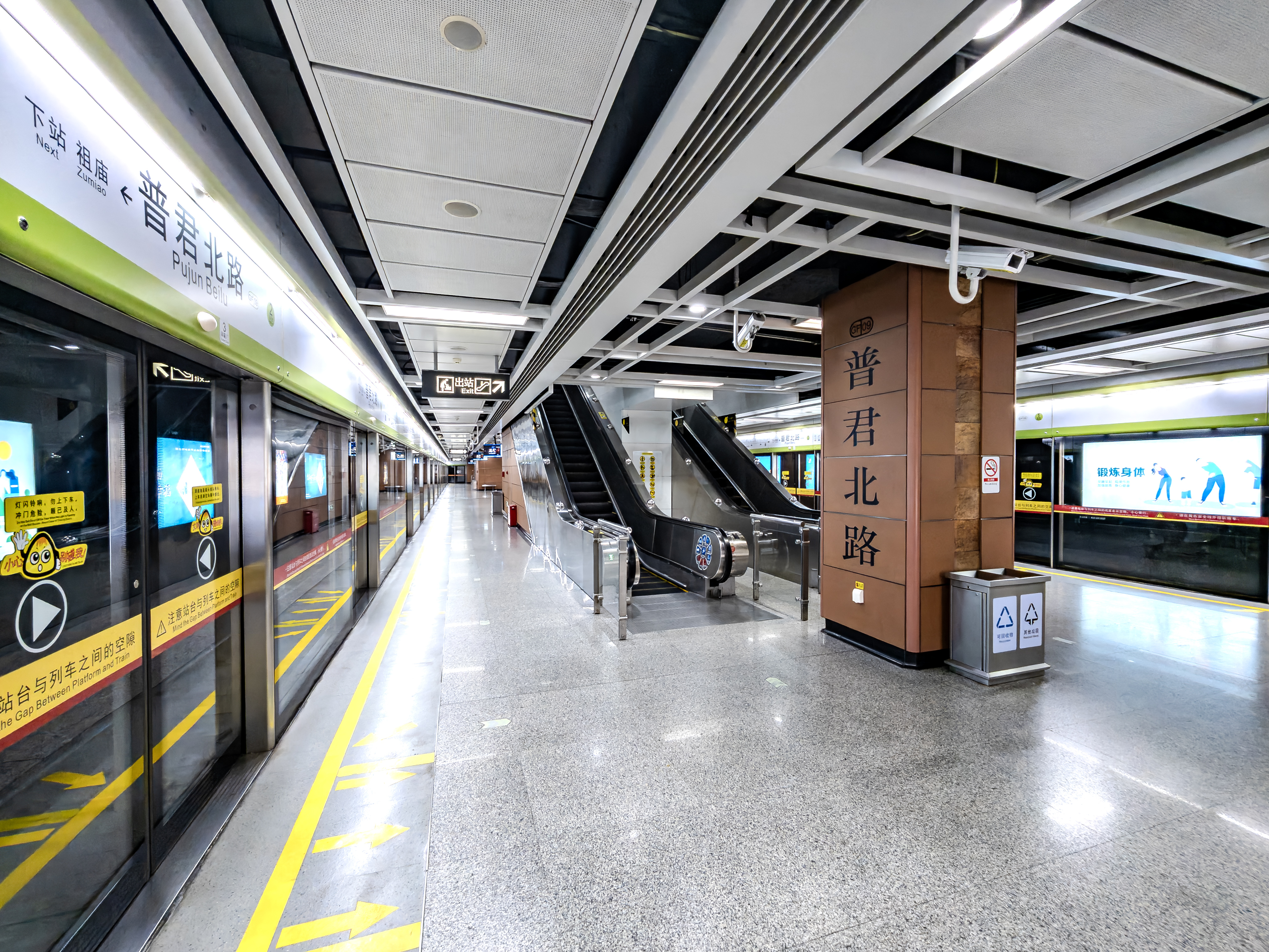

General information
- Location: Chancheng District, Foshan, Guangdong; China
- Operated by: Foshan Railway Investment Construction Group Co. Ltd. Guangzhou Metro Co. Ltd.
- Line: Guangfo line
- Platforms: 2 (1 island platform)

Construction
- Structure type: Underground

Other information
- Station code: GF09

History
- Opened: 3 November 2010; 15 years ago

Services
Preceding station	Foshan Metro	Following station
Zumiao towards Xincheng Dong	Guangfo Line	Chao'an towards Lijiao
Location

Pujun Beilu Station (Chinese: 普君北路站; pinyin: Pǔjūn Běilù Zhàn; Jyutping: pou^{2}gwan^{1} bak^{1}lou^{6} zaam^{6}; lit. 'Pujun North Road station') is a metro station on the Guangfo Line (FMetro Line 1). located under Zhaoxiang Road (兆祥路) just west of its junction Pujun North Road (普君北路) and Shidongxia Road (市东下路) in the Chancheng District of Foshan, near Zhaoxiang Park (兆祥公园) and the Guangdong Cantonese Opera Museum (广东粤剧博物馆). It was completed on 3 November 2010.

== Station layout ==
G	-	Exits
L1; Concourse	Lobby	Customer Service, Shops, Vending machines, ATMs
L2; Platforms	Platform 2	Guangfo towards Xincheng Dong (Zumiao)
L2; Platforms	Island platform, doors will open on the left
L2; Platforms	Platform 1	Guangfo towards Lijiao (Chao'an)

== Exits ==
Exit number	Exit location
Exit A	Zhaoxiang Lu
Exit B	Zhaoxiang Lu
Exit C	Shidong Xialu
Exit D	Zhaoxiang Lu
Exit E	Zhaoxiang Lu
