= Chao'an station =

Guangfo Metro station in Foshan

Coordinates: 23.0277°N 113.1333°E

Chao'an 朝安
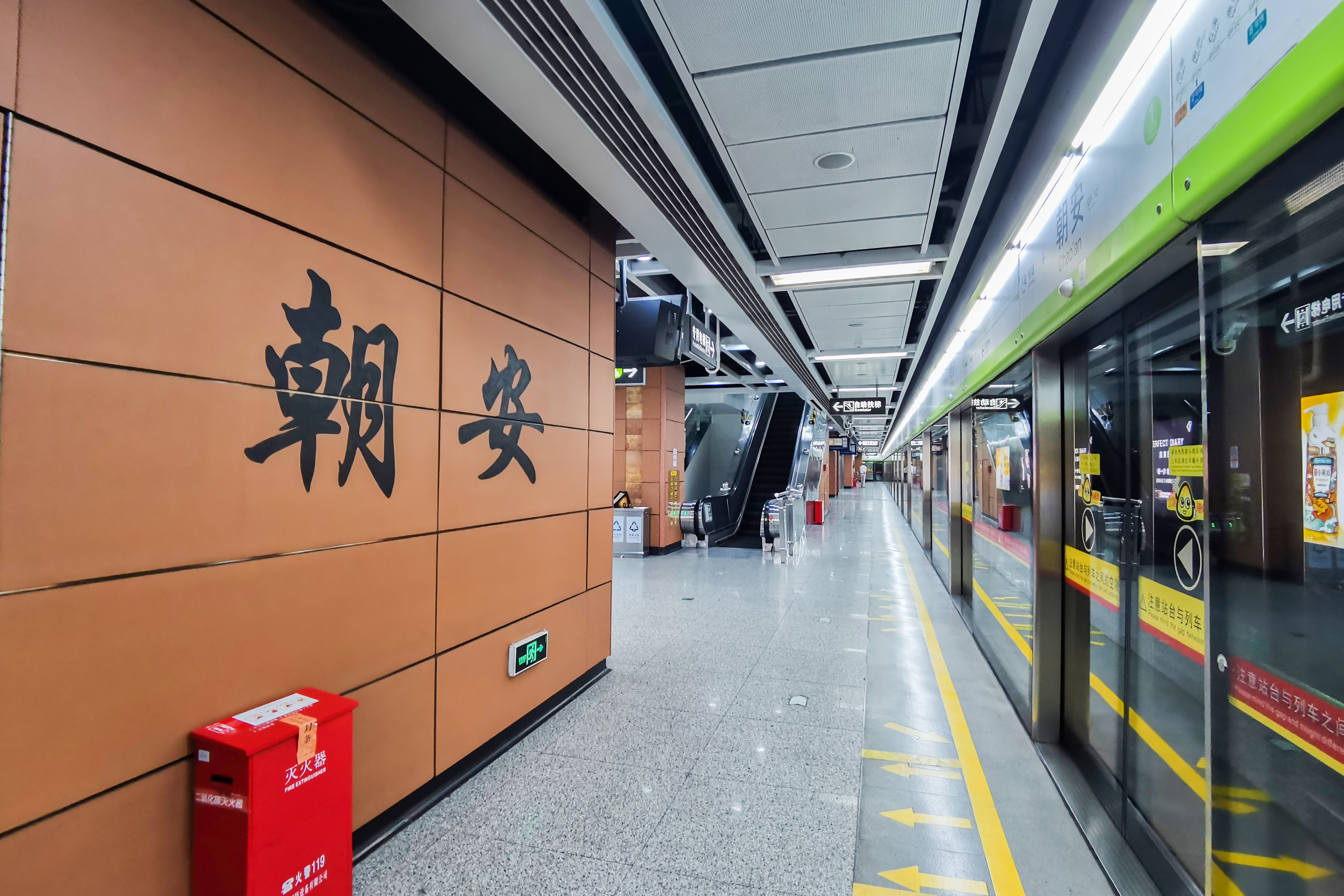

General information
- Location: Chancheng District, Foshan, Guangdong; China
- Operated by: Foshan Railway Investment Construction Group Co. Ltd. Guangzhou Metro Co. Ltd.
- Line: Guangfo line
- Platforms: 2 (1 island platform)

Construction
- Structure type: Underground

Other information
- Station code: GF10

History
- Opened: 3 November 2010; 15 years ago

Services
| Preceding station | Foshan Metro | Following station |
|---|---|---|
| Pujun Beilu towards Xincheng Dong | Guangfo Line | Guicheng towards Lijiao |

Chao'an Station (Chinese: 朝安站; pinyin: Cháo'ān Zhàn; Jyutping: Ciu^{4}on^{1} zaam^{6}) is a metro station on the Guangzhou Metro's Guangfo Line (FMetro Line 1). It is located underground at the junction of Zhaoxiang Road (兆祥路) and North Chao'an Road (朝安北路) in the Chancheng District of Foshan.

The station is surrounded by textile and cotton factories and is near the Huanshi Children's Garments Trade Centre (环市童装交易中心), China's largest children garment trade centre. It was completed on 3 November 2010.

== Station layout ==
| G | - | Exits |
| L1; Concourse | Lobby | Customer Service, Shops, Vending machines, ATMs |
| L2; Platforms | Platform 2 | Guangfo towards Xincheng Dong (Pujun Beilu) |
| L2; Platforms | Island platform, doors will open on the left |
| L2; Platforms | Platform 1 | Guangfo towards Lijiao (Guicheng) |

== Exits ==
| Exit number | Exit location |
|---|---|
| Exit A | Zhaoxiang Donglu |
| Exit B | Chao'an Beilu |
| Exit C | Zhaoxiang Donglu |
