= Tongji Lu station =

Guangfo Metro station in Foshan

Coordinates: 23.0191°N 113.1084°E

Tongji Lu 同济路
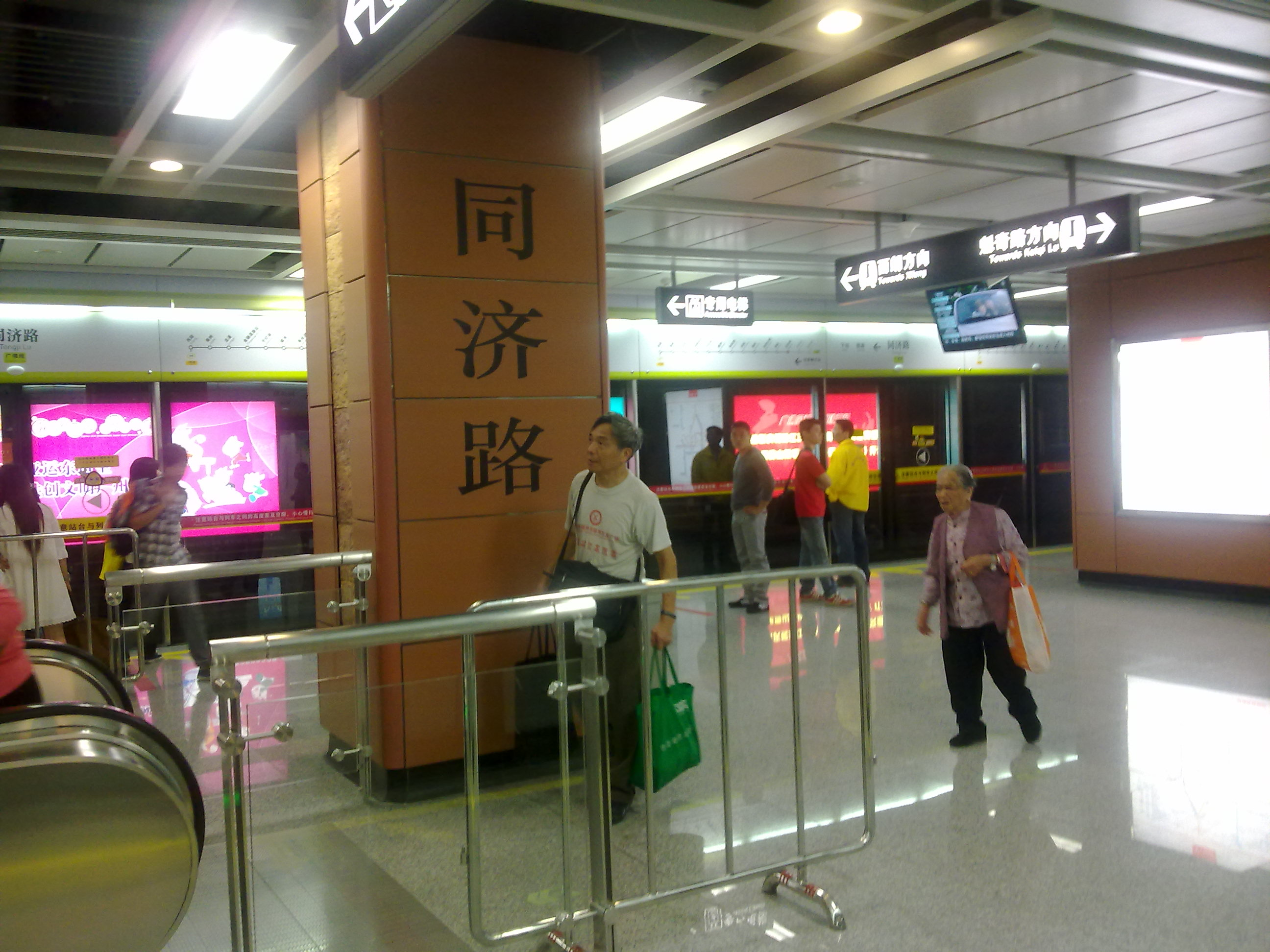

Chinese name
- Simplified Chinese: 同济路站
- Traditional Chinese: 同濟路站
- Literal meaning: Tongji Road Station
Transcriptions
Standard Mandarin
- Hanyu Pinyin: Tóngjì Lù Zhàn
Yue: Cantonese
- Jyutping: tung^{4}zai^{3} lou^{6} zaam^{6}

General information
- Location: Chancheng District, Foshan, Guangdong; China
- Operated by: Foshan Railway Investment Construction Group Co. Ltd. Guangzhou Metro Co. Ltd.
- Line(s): Guangfo Line
- Platforms: 2 (1 island platform)

Construction
- Structure type: Underground

Other information
- Station code: GF07

History
- Opened: 3 November 2010; 14 years ago

Services
Preceding station	Foshan Metro	Following station
Jihua Park towards Xincheng Dong	Guangfo Line	Zumiao towards Lijiao

Tongji Lu Station (Chinese: 同济路站; lit. 'Tongji Road Station') is a metro station on the Guangfo Line (FMetro Line 1). It is located under the junction of Fenjiang Middle Road (汾江中路) and Tongji Road (同济路) in the Chancheng District of Foshan. The station is near the business areas of Jihua Road (季华路) and the Foshan Ancestral Temple (佛山祖庙), and there are many leisure and entertainment facilities nearby. It was completed on 3 November 2010.

== Station layout ==
G	-	Exits
L1; Concourse	Lobby	Customer Service, Shops, Vending machines, ATMs
L2; Platforms	Platform 2	Guangfo towards Xincheng Dong (Jihua Park)
L2; Platforms	Island platform, doors will open on the left
L2; Platforms	Platform 1	Guangfo towards Lijiao (Zumiao)

== Exits ==
Exit number	Exit location
Exit A	Tongji Lu
Exit B	Fenjiang Zhonglu
Exit D	Fenjiang Zhonglu
