= Linyuebei station =

Nanhai Tram Line 1 (Foshan Metro) station

Linyuebei 林岳北
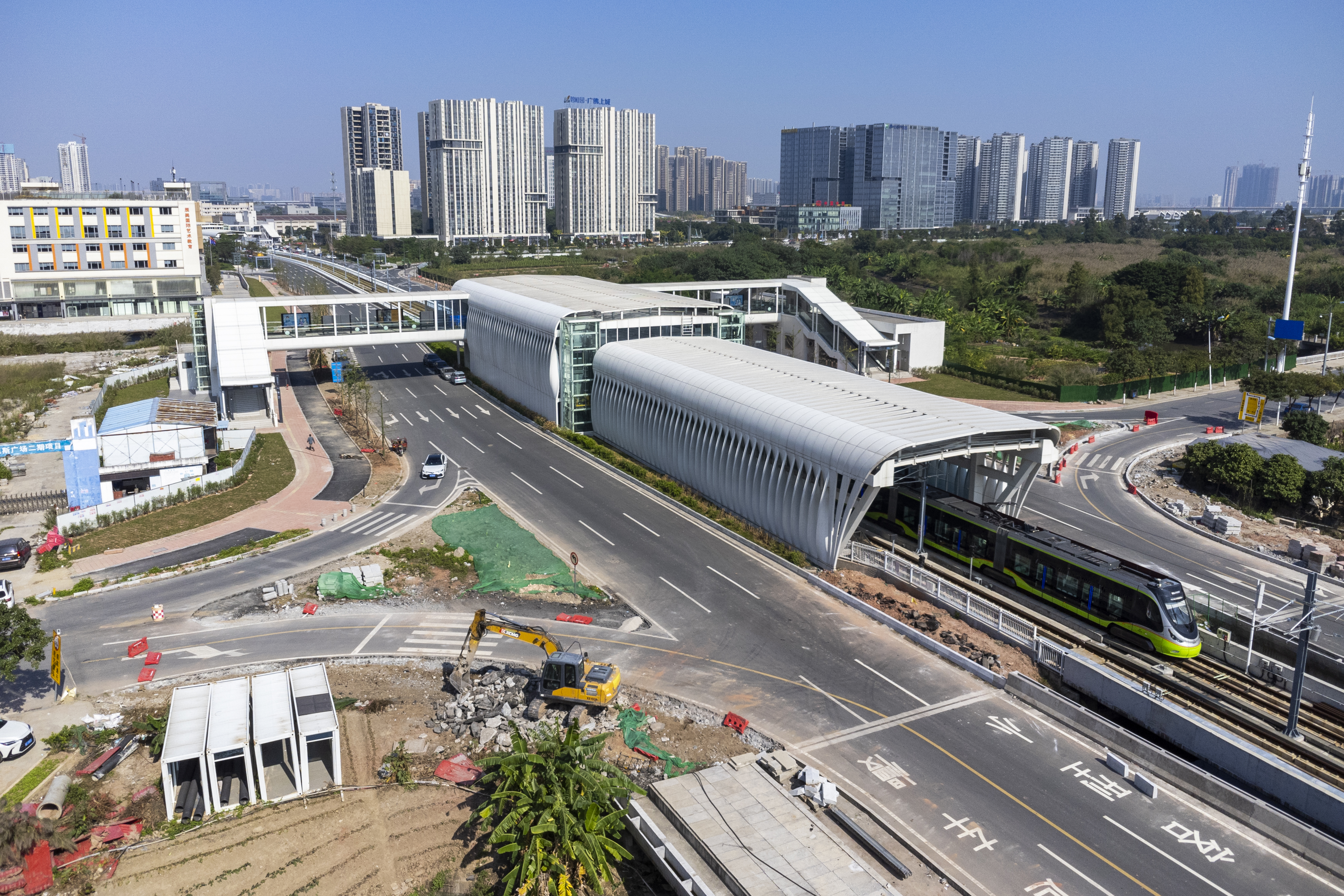
- Exterior

Chinese name
- Chinese: 林岳北站
Transcriptions
Standard Mandarin
- Hanyu Pinyin: Línyuè Běi Zhàn
Yue: Cantonese
- Yale Romanization: Làhmgohk Bāk Jaahm
- Jyutping: Lam^{4}ngok^{6} Bak^{1} Zaam^{6}

General information
- Location: North side of intersection of Taishan Road (泰山路) and Gangbei Road (岗北路), Guicheng Subdistrict; Nanhai District, Foshan, Guangdong; China
- Coordinates: 23°0′22.18″N 113°13′41.88″E
- Operator: Foshan Metro Operation Co., Ltd.
- Line: Nanhai Tram Line 1
- Platforms: 2 (2 side platforms)
- Tracks: 2

Construction
- Structure type: At-grade
- Accessible: Yes

Other information
- Station code: TNH113

History
- Opened: 29 November 2022 (3 years ago)

Services
Preceding station	Foshan Metro	Following station
Sanshanxinchengnan towards Leigang	Nanhai Tram Line 1	Linyue Xi towards Linyuedong
Location

Linyuebei station (Chinese: 林岳北站; pinyin: Línyuè Běi Zhàn; Cantonese Yale: Làhmgohk Bāk Jaahm) is a light metro station on Nanhai Tram Line 1 of Foshan Metro, located in Foshan's Nanhai District. It opened on 29 November 2022.

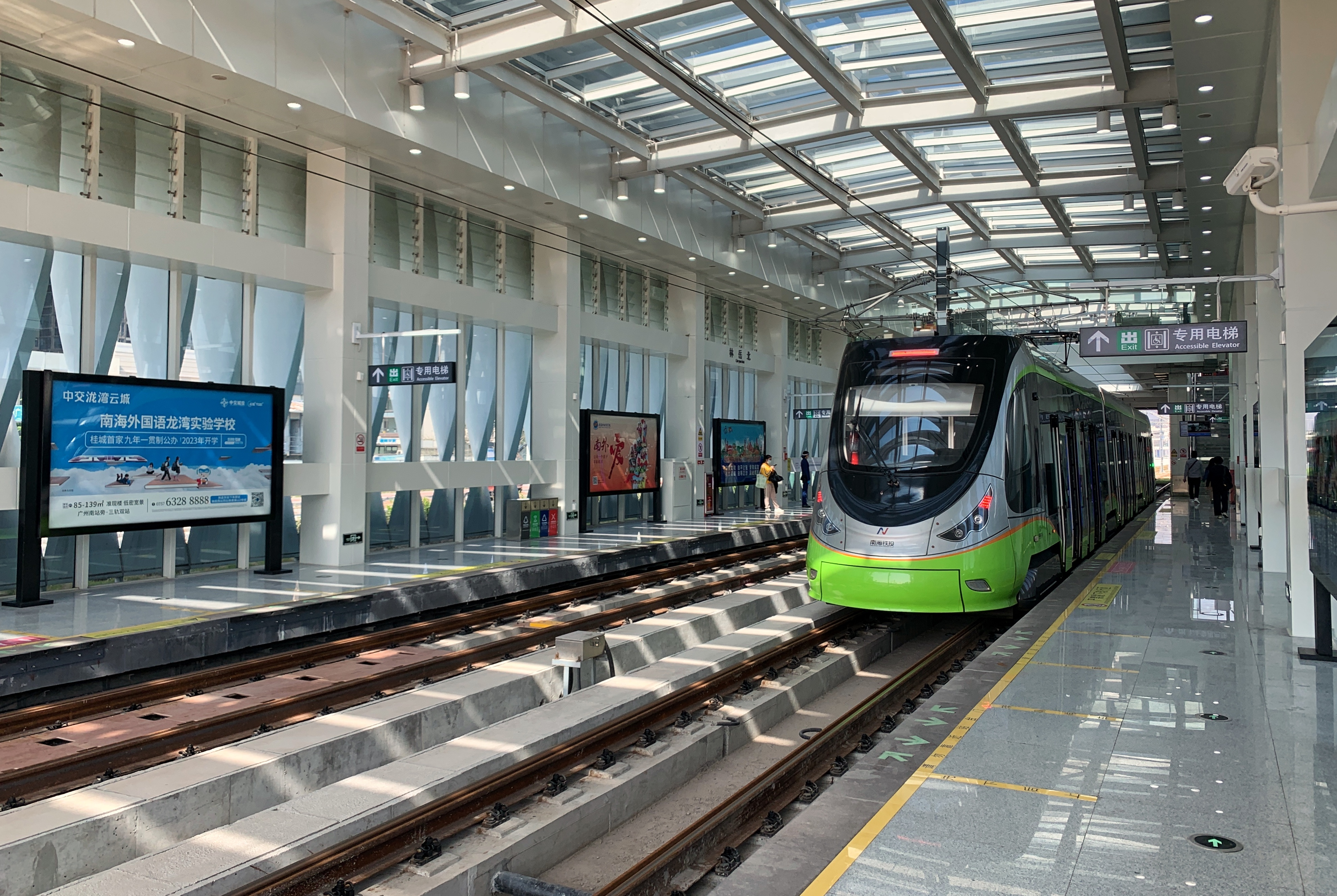
Platform

== Station layout ==
The station has two side platforms on Taishan Road.

F2; Concourse	Lobby	Ticket Machines, Customer Service, Police Station, Security Facilities, Exits A-D
G Platforms	Side platform, doors will open on the right
G Platforms	Platform 1	TNH1 towards Leigang (Sanshanxinchengnan)
G Platforms	Platform 2	TNH1 towards Linyuedong (Linyue Xi)
G Platforms	Side platform, doors will open on the right

=== Entrances/exits ===
The station has 4 points of entry/exit. All exits are equipped with elevators.

- A: Gangbei Road
- B: Gangbei Road
- C: Gangbei Road
- D: Gangbei Road
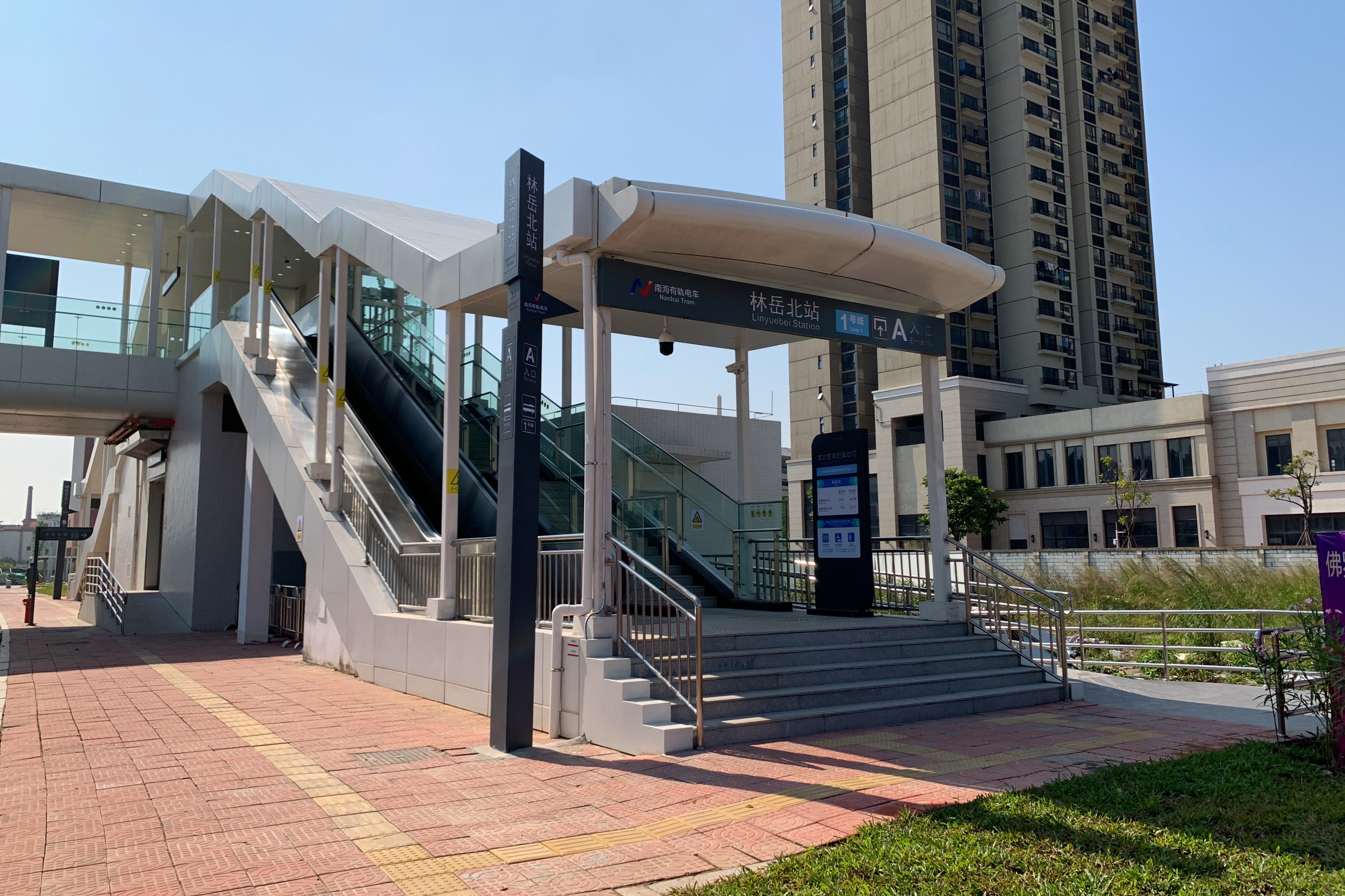
Entrance A

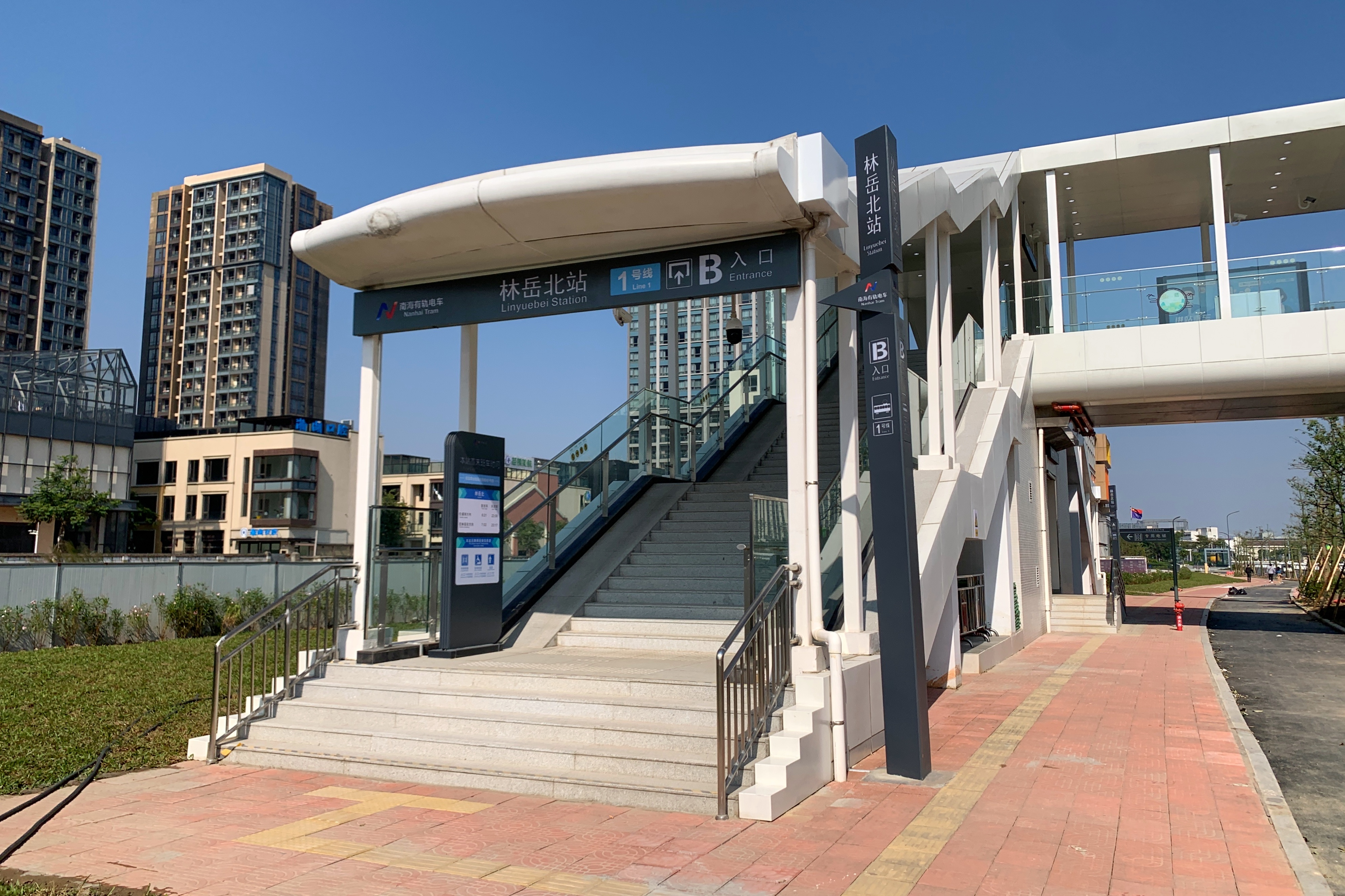
Entrance B

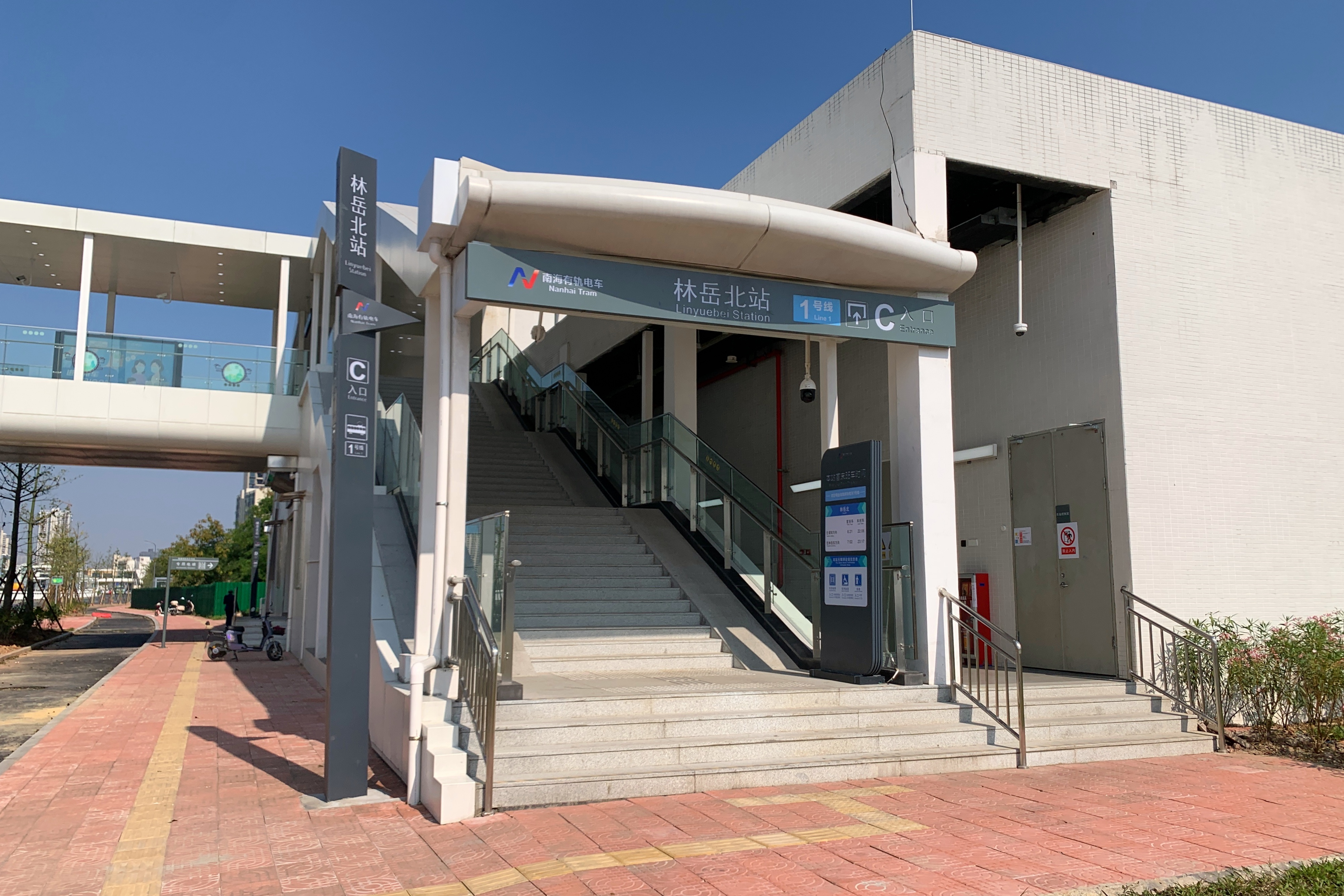
Entrance C

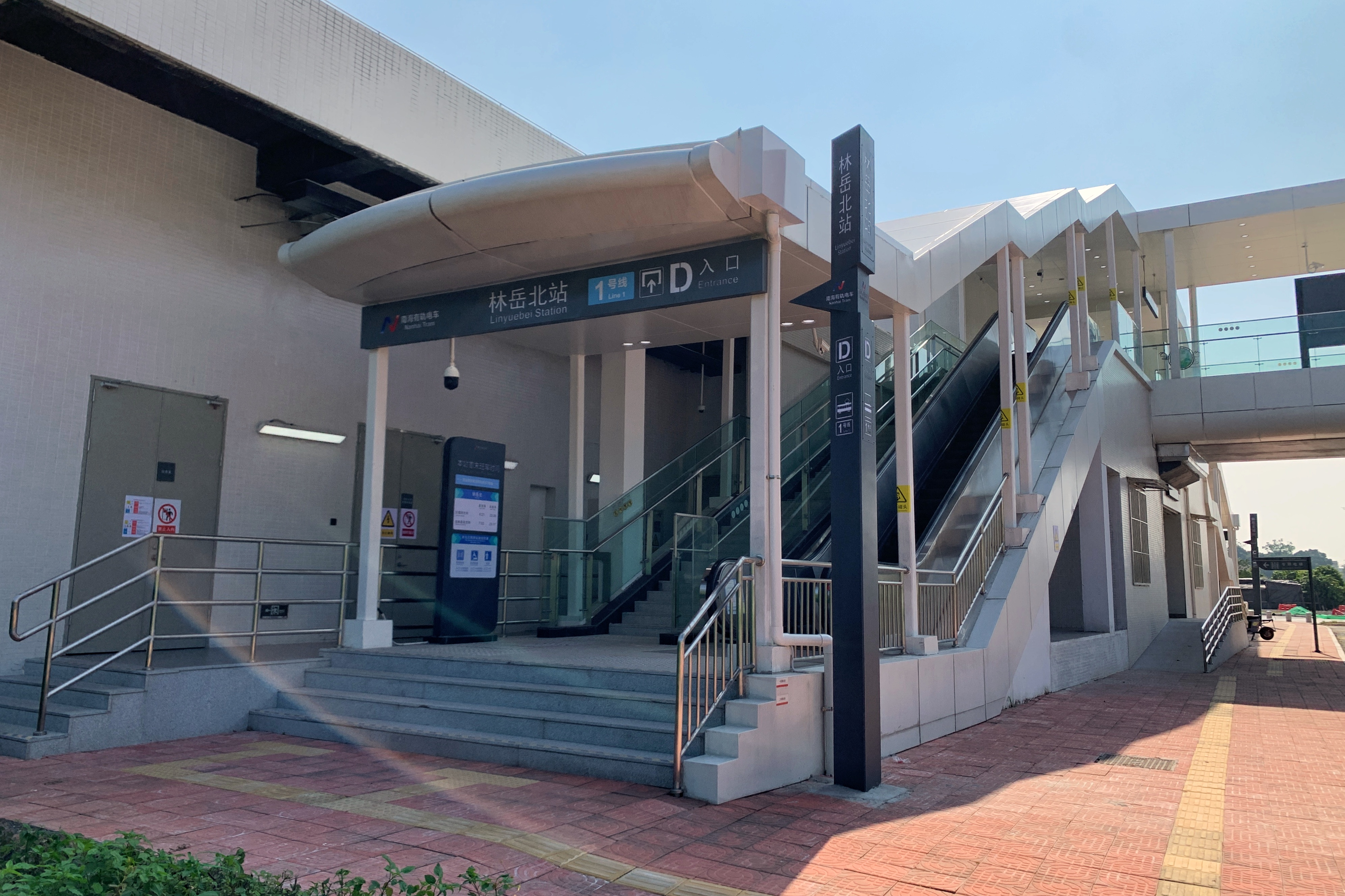
Entrance D

== History ==
This station was originally planned to be the southeastern terminus of the initial section, but it was later postponed to the remaining section due to the addition of Wenhanhu Park (Ji Hua Laboratory) station between Sanshanxinchengnan and Sanshanxinchengbei stations. The initial section has therefore also been shortened from this station to Sanshanxinchengbei. On 29 November 2022, the station was opened with the opening of the remaining section of Nanhai Tram Line 1.
