= Yayi Park station =

Foshan Metro Line 3 station

Yayi Park 亚艺公园
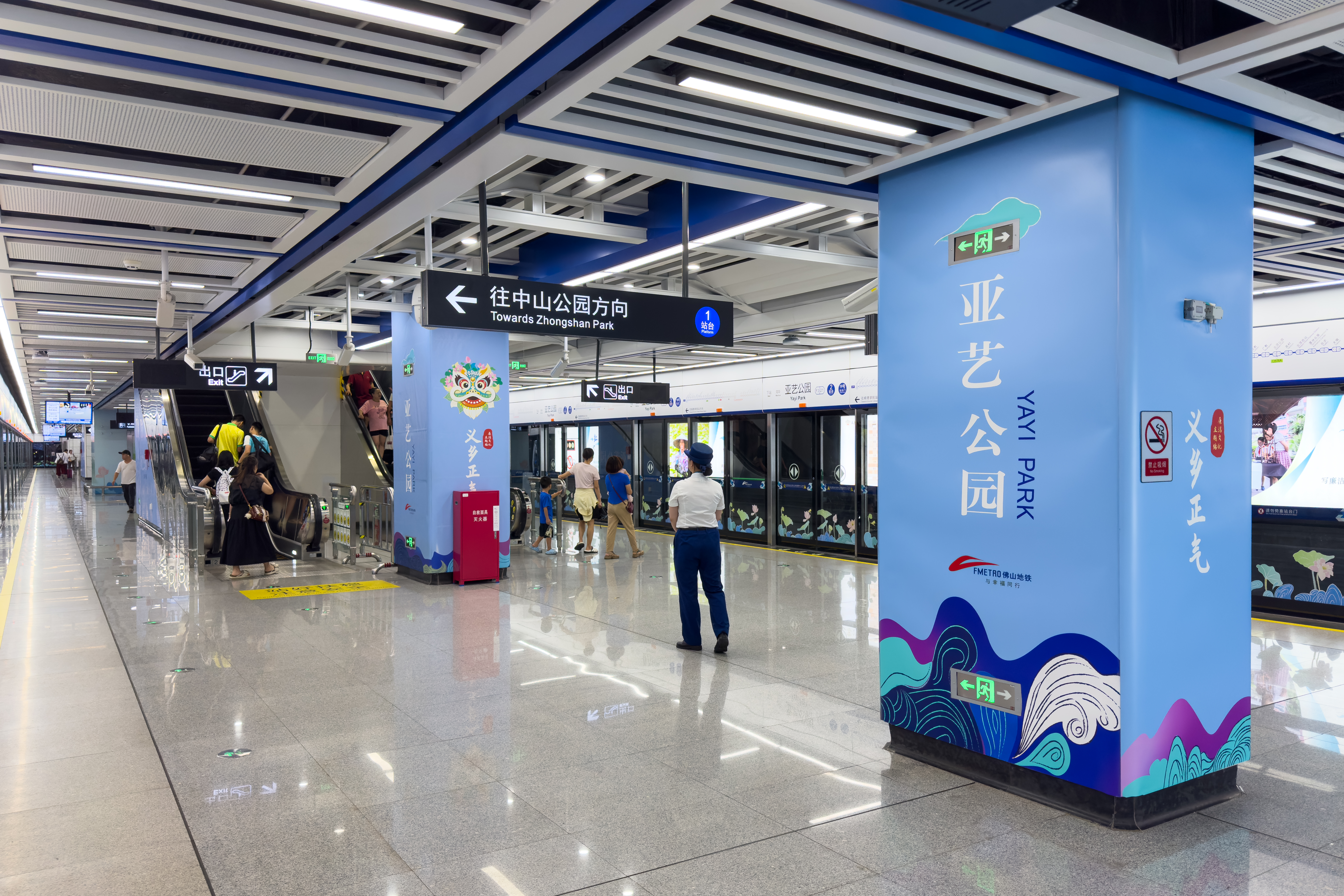
- Platform

Chinese name
- Simplified Chinese: 亚艺公园站
- Traditional Chinese: 亞藝公園站
Transcriptions
Standard Mandarin
- Hanyu Pinyin: Yàyì Gōngyuán Zhàn
Yue: Cantonese
- Yale Romanization: A'ngaih Gūng'yún Jaahm
- Jyutping: Aa^{3}ngai^{6} Gung^{1}jyun^{2} Zaam^{6}

General information
- Location: Intersection of Lvjing Road (绿景路) and Wenhua Road Middle (文华中路), Shiwanzhen Subdistrict; Chancheng District, Foshan, Guangdong; China
- Coordinates: 23°0′16.42″N 113°7′27.55″E
- Operator: Foshan Metro Operation Co., Ltd.
- Line: Line 3
- Platforms: 2 (1 island platform)
- Tracks: 2

Construction
- Structure type: Underground
- Accessible: Yes

Other information
- Station code: F321

History
- Opened: 28 December 2022 (3 years ago)
- Former names: Shencun (深村)

Services
Preceding station	Foshan Metro	Following station
Jihua Liulu towards Foshan University	Line 3	Wanhua towards Shunde College Railway Station
Location

Yayi Park station (simplified Chinese: 亚艺公园站; traditional Chinese: 亞藝公園站; pinyin: Yàyì Gōngyuán Zhàn; Cantonese Yale: A'ngaih Gūng'yún Jaahm; lit. 'Asian Art Park station') is a station on Line 3 of Foshan Metro, located in Foshan's Chancheng District. It opened on 28 December 2022.

== Station layout ==
The station has an island platform under Middle Wenhua Road.

G	-	Exits A-D
L1; Concourse	Lobby	Ticket Machines, Customer Service, Shops, Police Station, Security Facilities
L2; Platforms	Platform 1	3 towards Foshan University (Jihua Liulu)
L2; Platforms	Island platform, doors will open on the left
L2; Platforms	Platform 2	3 towards Shunde College Railway Station (Wanhua)

=== Platform ===
Although this station is not included in the themed stations of the first section of Line 3, it is also designated as a "clean culture theme station". The columns, elevators and some walls of the concourse and platform are decorated with a clean theme based on lion dance and lotus elements.

=== Entrances/exits ===
The station has 4 points of entry/exit, located on the north and south sides of Wenhua Road Middle. Exits A and C are equipped with elevators.

- A: Wenhua Road Middle
- B: Lüjing 3rd Road, Foshan Agile Garden
- C: Wenhua Road Middle, Asian Art Park
- D: Lüjing 3rd Road, Wenhua Park

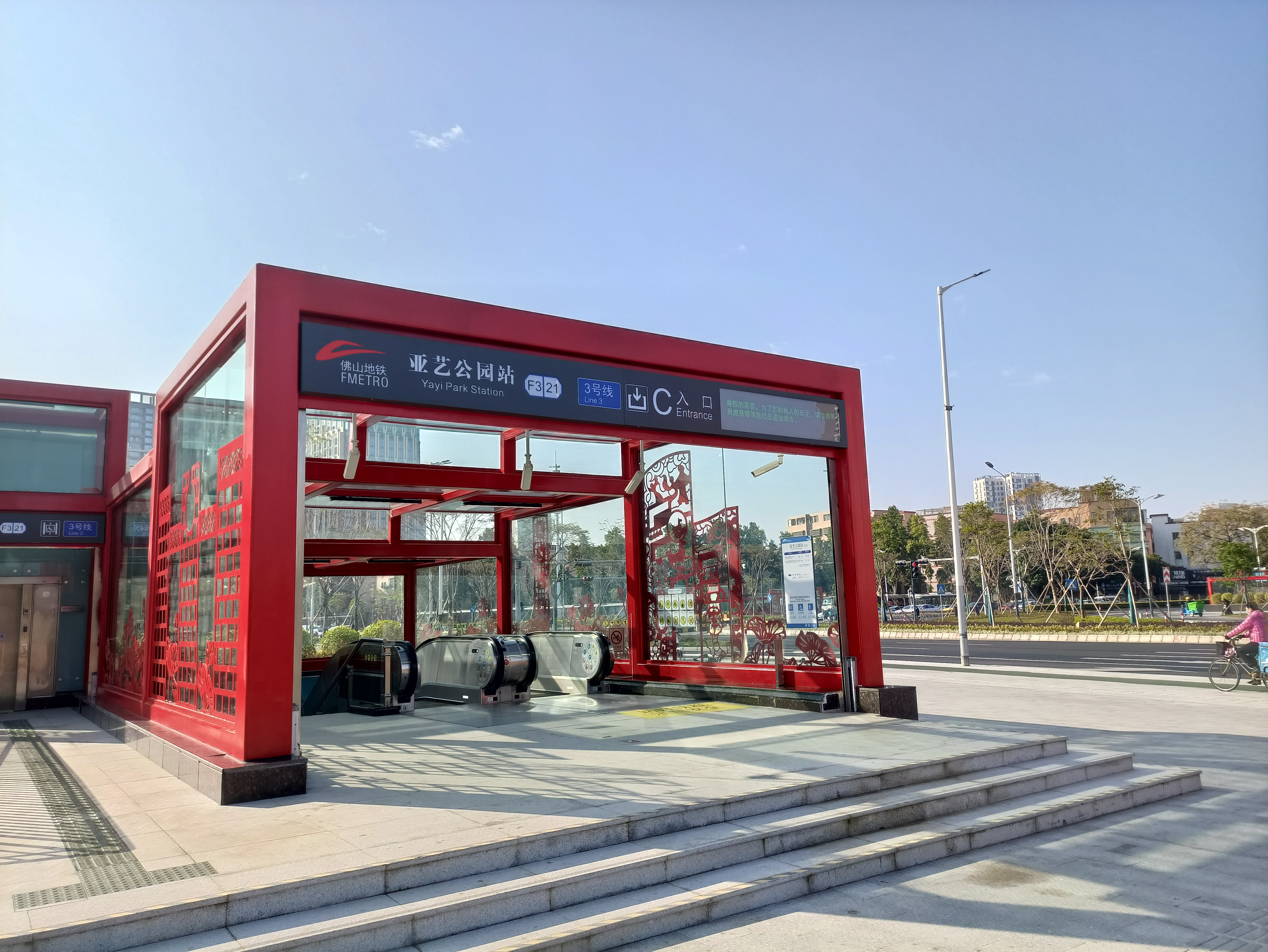
Entrance C

== History ==
The station was called Shencun station during the planning and construction phase, named after Shencun Village west of the station. In 2022, the station was renamed to Yayi Park station after the Asia Art Park where the station is located.

On 13 October 2017, the first diaphragm wall reinforcement cage of the main envelope structure of the station was successfully hoisted into the station pit. On 17 November 2017, the station began enclosure construction. On 17 June 2020, the main station structure was successfully topped out. On 3 September 2020, the double line tunnel between this station and Wanhua successfully broke through. On 25 May 2021, the double line tunnel between this station and TV Tower station (now Jihua Liulu) successfully broke through.

On 29 June 2022, the sub-unit project of the station passed acceptance. On 15 July 2022, the station successfully completed the fourth phase of traffic diversion and reform and realized the enclosure construction of the remaining projects.
