= Wenhanhu Park (Ji Hua Laboratory) station =

Nanhai Tram Line 1 (Foshan Metro) station

Wenhanhu Park (Ji Hua Laboratory) 文翰湖公园（季华实验室）
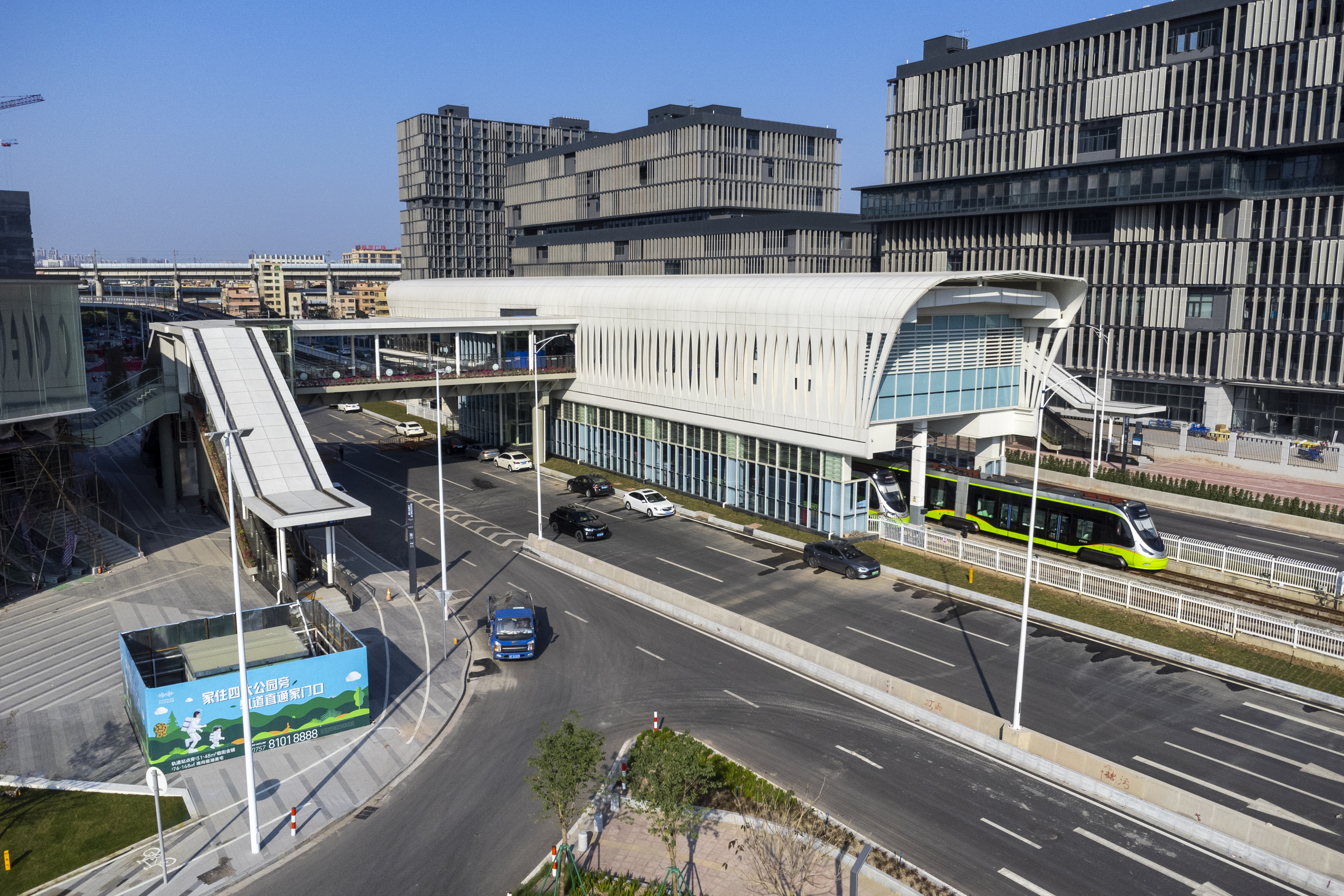
- Exterior

Chinese name
- Simplified Chinese: 文翰湖公园（季华实验室）站
- Traditional Chinese: 文翰湖公園（季華實驗室）站
Transcriptions
Standard Mandarin
- Hanyu Pinyin: Wénhànhú Gōngyuán (Jì Huá Shíyànshì) Zhàn
Yue: Cantonese
- Yale Romanization: Màhnhonwù Gūng'yún (Gwaiwǎ Sahtyim Sāht) Jaahm
- Jyutping: Man^{4}hon^{6}wu^{4} Gung^{1}jyun^{4} (Gwai^{3} Waa^{4} Sat^{6}jim^{6}sat^{1}) Zaam^{6}

General information
- Location: North side of intersection of Taishan Road (泰山路) and Huandao South Road (環島南路), Guicheng Subdistrict; Nanhai District, Foshan, Guangdong; China
- Coordinates: 23°1′19.74″N 113°13′49.37″E
- Operator: Foshan Metro Operation Co., Ltd.
- Line: Nanhai Tram Line 1
- Platforms: 2 (2 side platforms)
- Tracks: 2

Construction
- Structure type: At-grade
- Accessible: Yes

Other information
- Station code: TNH111

History
- Opened: 29 November 2022 (3 years ago)

Services
Preceding station	Foshan Metro	Following station
Sanshanxinchengbei towards Leigang	Nanhai Tram Line 1	Sanshanxinchengnan towards Linyuedong
Location

Wenhanhu Park (Ji Hua Laboratory) station (simplified Chinese: 文翰湖公园（季华实验室）站; traditional Chinese: 文翰湖公園（季華實驗室）站; pinyin: Wénhànhú Gōngyuán (Jì Huá Shíyànshì) Zhàn; Cantonese Yale: Màhnhonwù Gūng'yún (Gwaiwǎ Sahtyim Sāht) Jaahm) is a light metro station on Nanhai Tram Line 1 of Foshan Metro, located in Foshan's Nanhai District. It opened on 29 November 2022.

The station name of this station is composed of the two names of Wenhanhu Park at the south of the station and the Ji Hua Laboratory in the east as the main and auxiliary station names respectively, excluding punctuation marks. With a total of ten Chinese characters, it has the longest station name of any rail transit station in the Guangzhou-Foshan area at present.

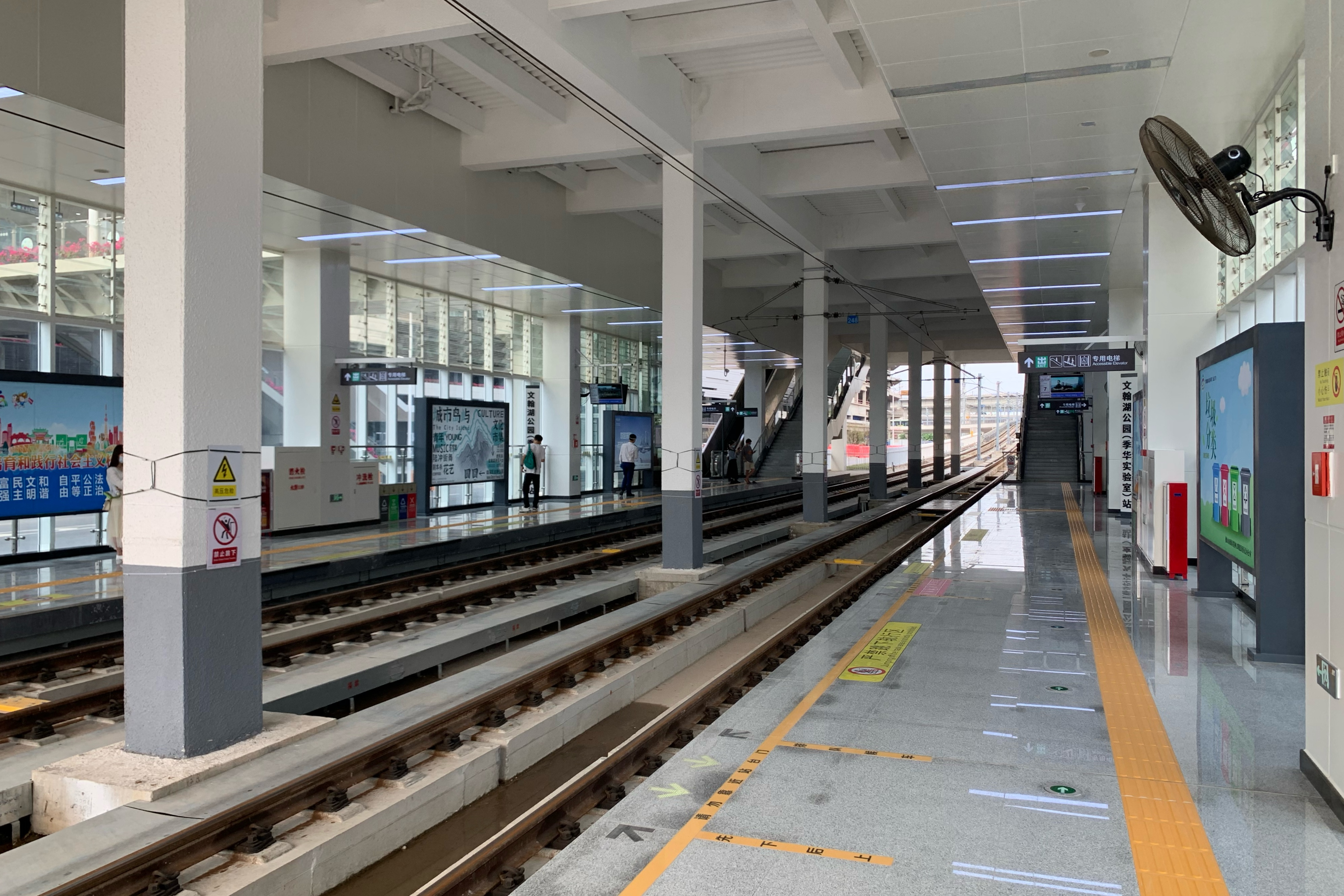
Platform

== Station layout ==
The station has two side platforms on Taishan Road.

F2; Concourse	Lobby	Ticket Machines, Customer Service, Police Station, Security Facilities, Exits A-D
G Platforms	Side platform, doors will open on the right
G Platforms	Platform 1	TNH1 towards Leigang (Sanshanxinchengbei)
G Platforms	Platform 2	TNH1 towards Linyuedong (Sanshanxinchengnan)
G Platforms	Side platform, doors will open on the right

=== Entrances/exits ===
Other than the 4 points of entry/exit that opened with the station, an extra passageway to the Ji Hua Laboratory was opened on 17 October 2023. All exits are equipped with elevators.

- A: Taishan Road
- B: Huandao South Road
- C: Huandao South Road
- D: Taishan Road, Ji Hua Laboratory
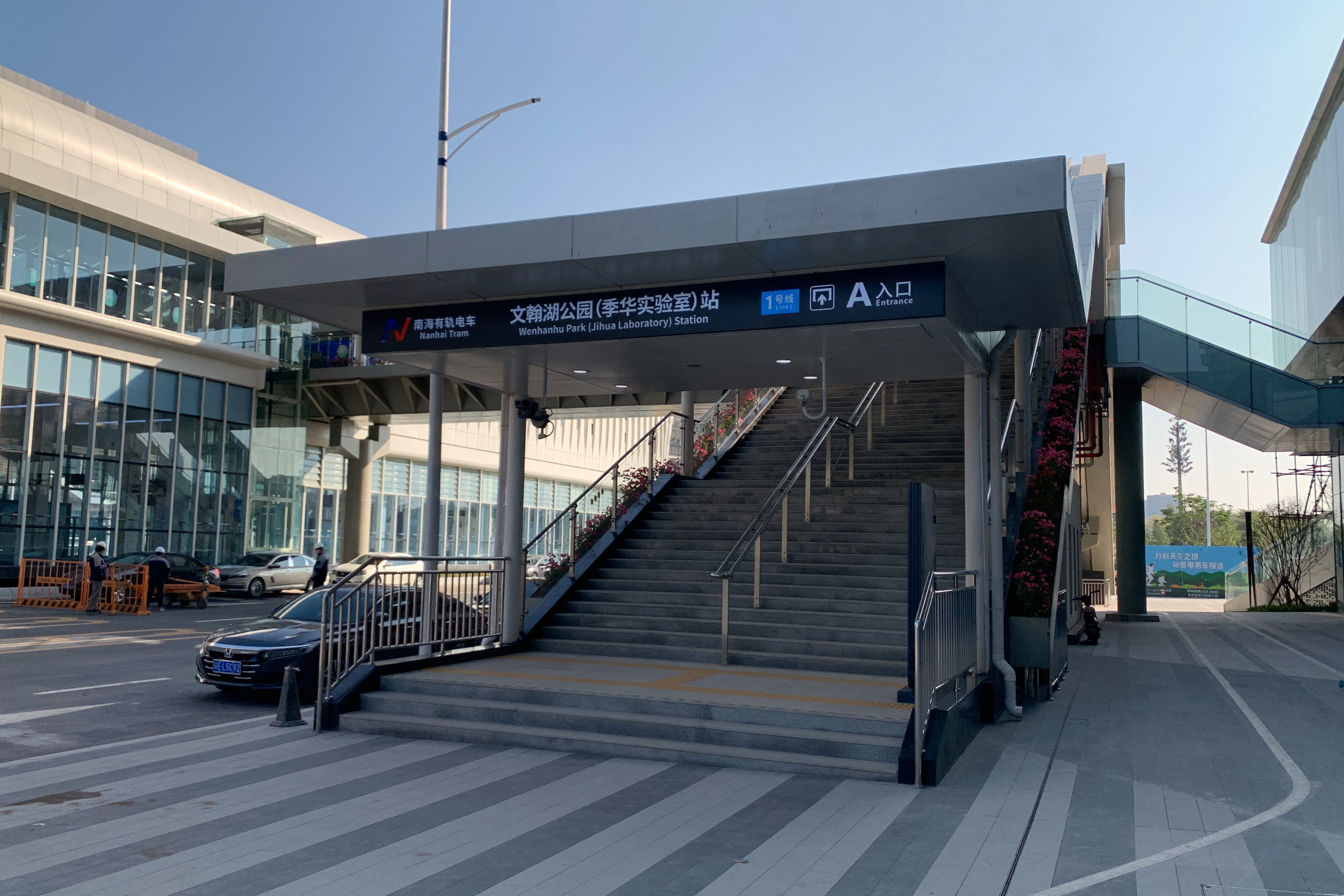
Entrance A

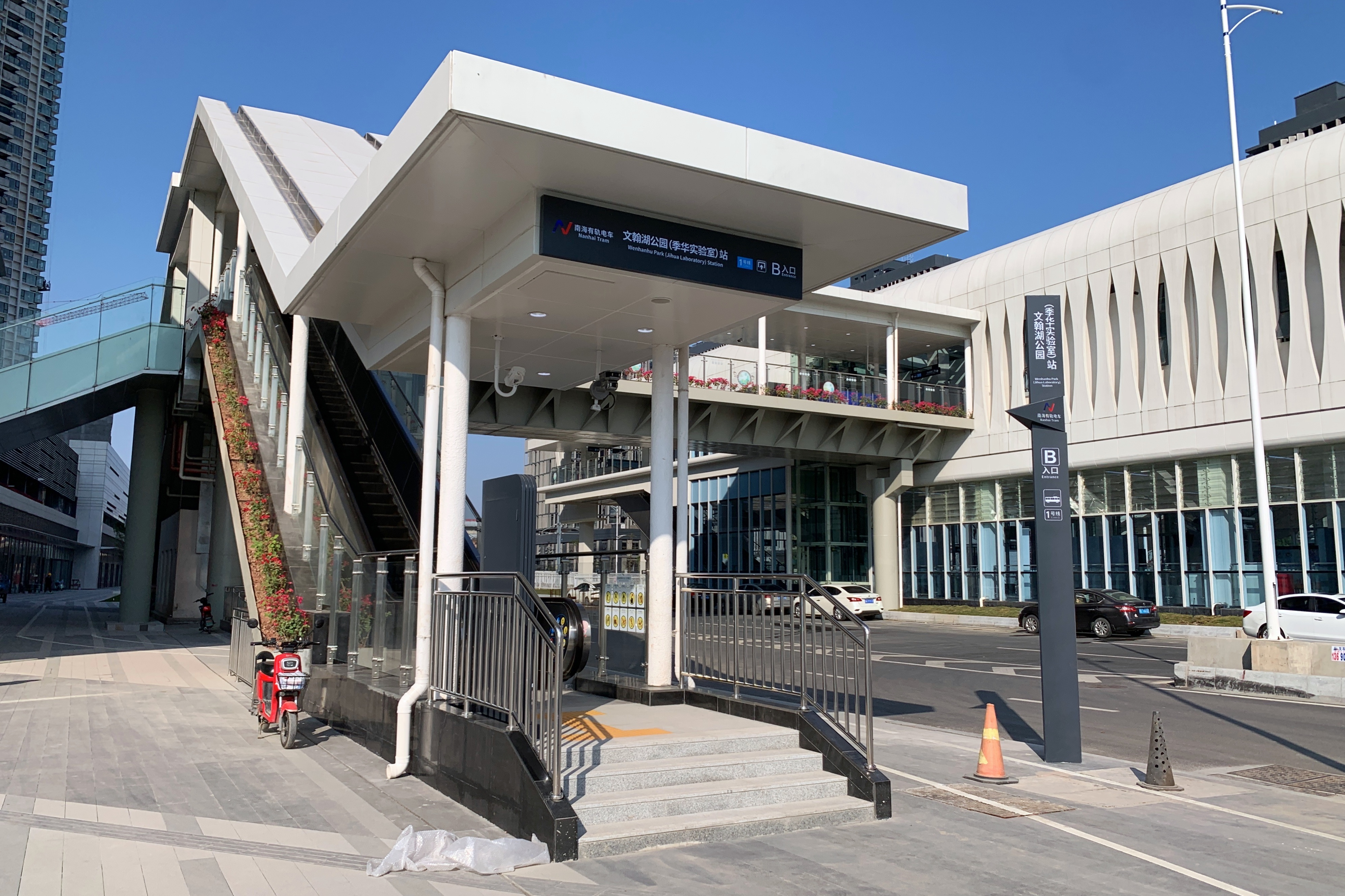
Entrance B

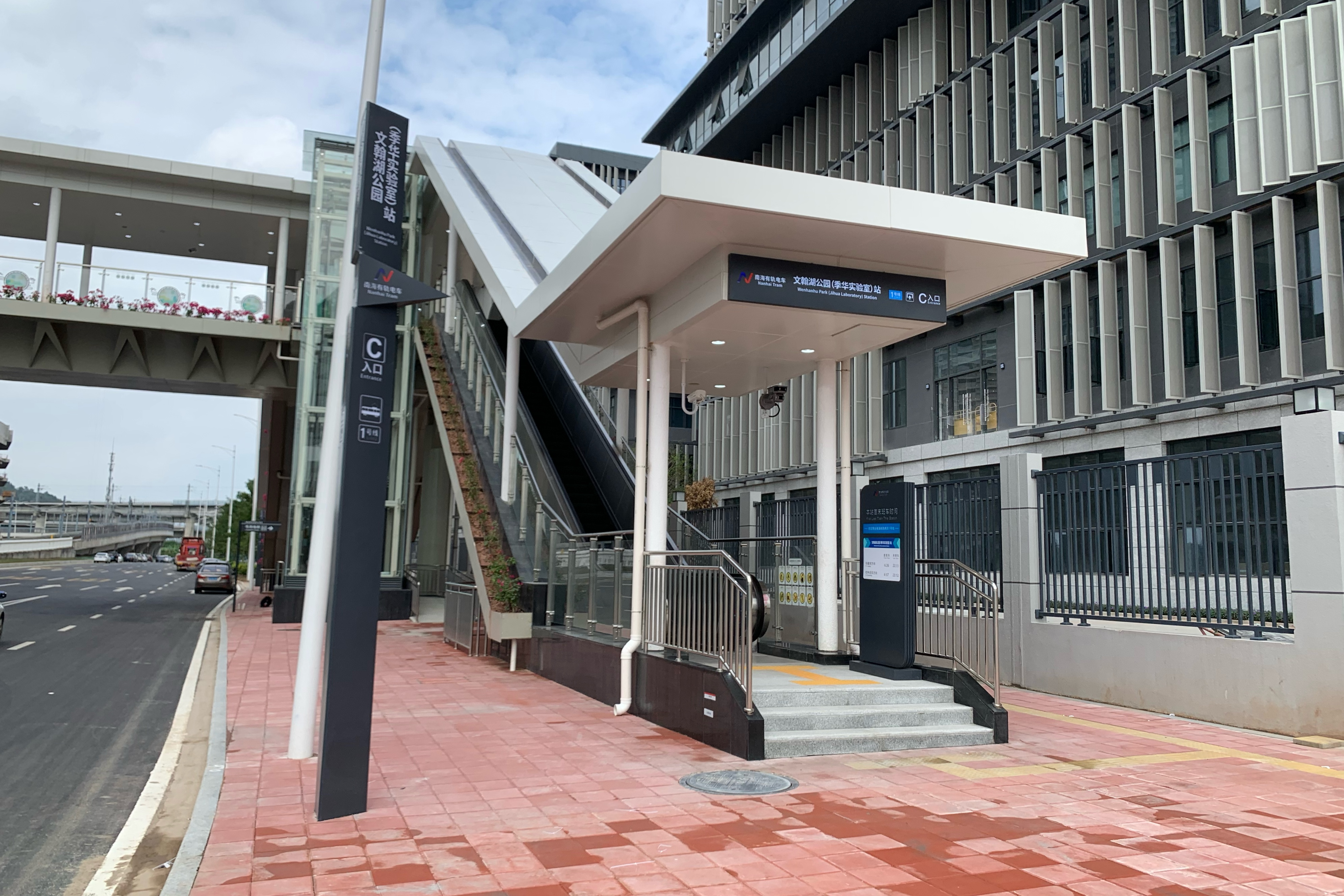
Entrance C

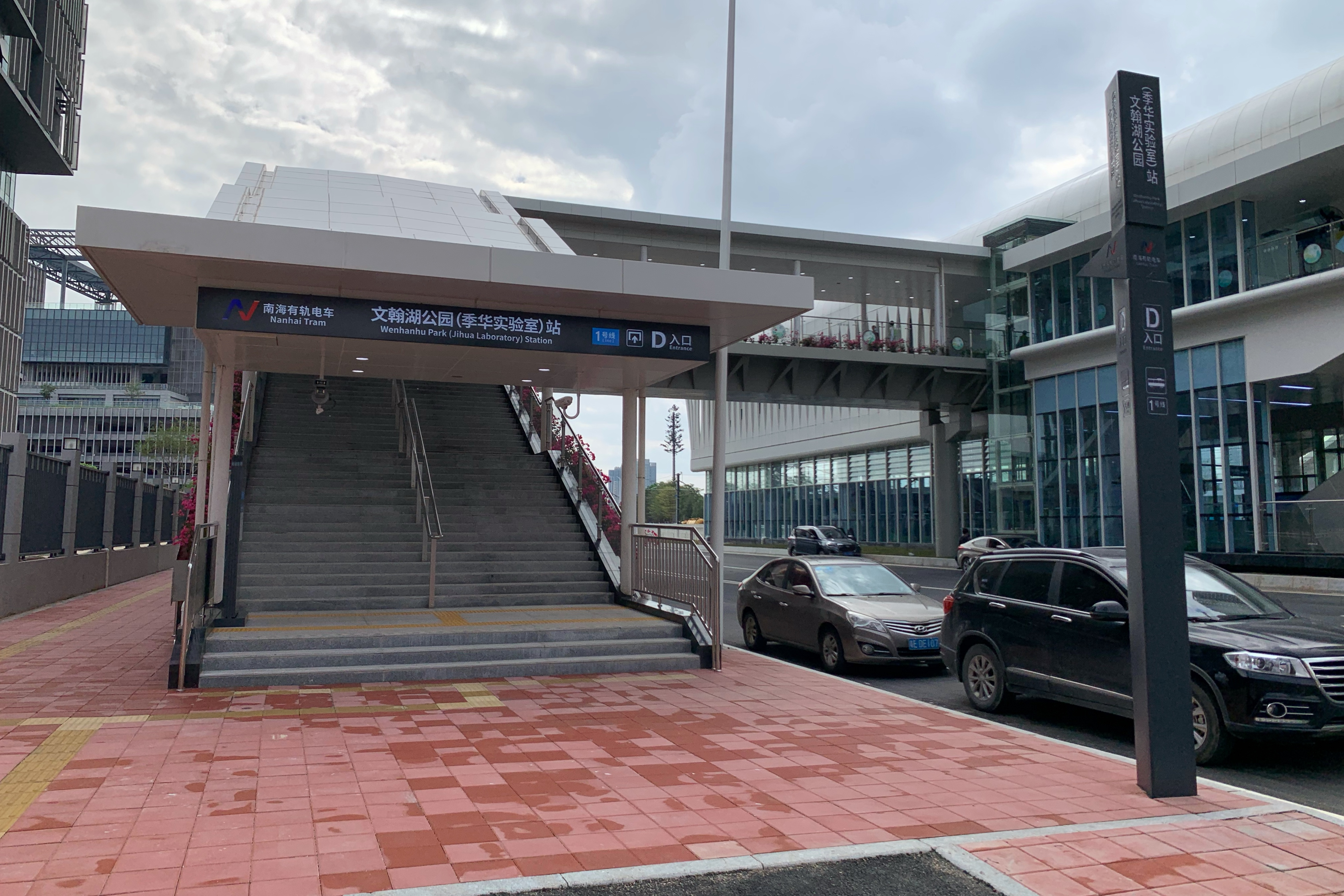
Entrance D

== History ==
When the Nanhai New Transit (now known as Nanhai Tram Line 1) was originally planned, this station was not included. In early 2021, before the construction of the line was about to complete, Nanhai District mentioned that a station called Wenhanhu would be added between Sanshanxinchengbei and Sanshanxinchengnan stations when bidding for the initial pre-operation safety assessment project of the line. As the construction of the new station will take longer in the later stage, the initial section of the line opening will also be shortened from Linyuebei to Sanshanxinchengbei station.

On the eve of the opening of the initial section, it was confirmed that the station was renamed Wenhanhu Park Station. On the eve of the opening of the remaining section, the sub-station name of Ji Hua Laboratory was added, making the station name of this station: Wenhanhu Park (Ji Hua Laboratory) station. On 29 November 2022, the station was opened with the opening of the remaining section of Nanhai Tram Line 1.
