= Jihua Liulu station =

Foshan Metro Line 3 station

Jihua Liulu 季华六路
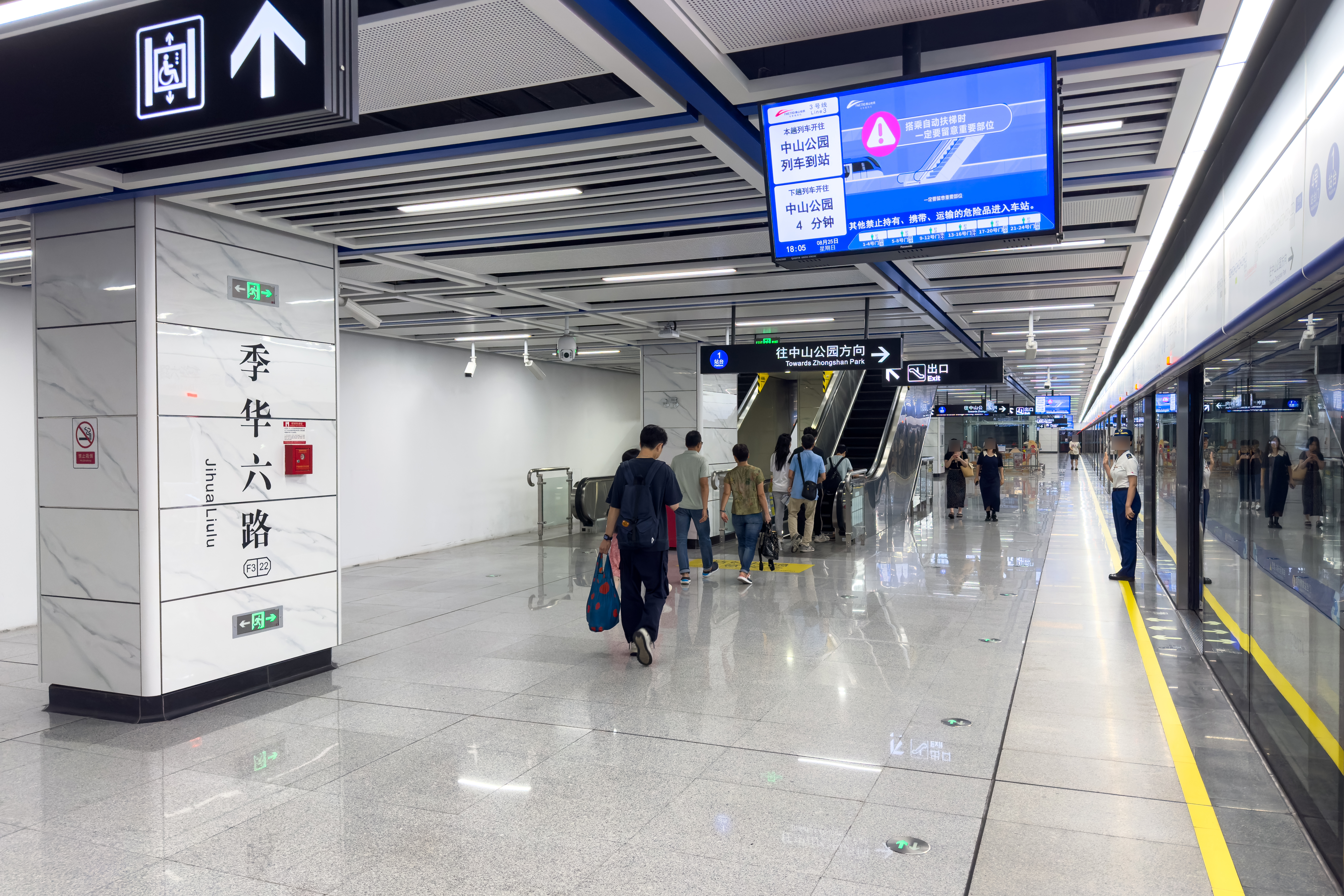
- Platform 1 (towards Foshan University)

Chinese name
- Simplified Chinese: 季华六路站
- Traditional Chinese: 季華六路站
Transcriptions
Standard Mandarin
- Hanyu Pinyin: Jìhuá Liùlù Zhàn
Yue: Cantonese
- Yale Romanization: Gwaiwàh Luhklouh Jaahm
- Jyutping: Gwai^{3}waa^{4} Luk^{6}lou^{6} Zaam^{6}

General information
- Location: Intersection of Jihua 6th Road (季华六路) and South Chao'an Road (朝安南路), Boundary of Shiwanzhen Subdistrict and Zumiao Subdistrict; Chancheng District, Foshan, Guangdong; China
- Coordinates: 23°0′52.78″N 113°7′53.15″E
- Operator: Foshan Metro Operation Co., Ltd.
- Lines: Line 3 Line 4 (future)
- Platforms: 4 (2 island platforms)
- Tracks: 2

Construction
- Structure type: Underground
- Accessible: Yes

Other information
- Station code: F322

History
- Opened: 28 December 2022 (3 years ago)

Services
| Preceding station | Foshan Metro | Following station |
|---|---|---|
| Zhen'an towards Foshan University | Line 3 | Yayi Park towards Shunde College Railway Station |
Location

Jihua Liulu station (simplified Chinese: 季华六路站; traditional Chinese: 季華六路站; pinyin: Jìhuá Liùlù Zhàn; Cantonese Yale: Gwaiwàh Luhklouh Jaahm; lit. 'Jihua Sixth Road station') is a station on Line 3 of Foshan Metro, located in Foshan's Chancheng District. It opened on 28 December 2022.

== Station layout ==
The station has 2 island platforms under Middle Wenhua Road, the inner tracks for Line 3, the outer tracks reserved for a future cross-platform interchange with Line 4.

| G | - | Exits A-D |
| L1; Concourse | Lobby | Ticket Machines, Customer Service, Shops, Police Station, Security Facilities |
| L2; Platforms | | 4 reserved platform |
| L2; Platforms | Island platform, doors will open on the right |
| L2; Platforms | Platform 2 | 3 towards Shunde College Railway Station (Yayi Park) |
| L2; Platforms | Platform 1 | 3 towards Foshan University (Zhen'an) |
| L2; Platforms | Island platform, doors will open on the right |
| L2; Platforms | | 4 reserved platform |

=== Entrances/exits ===
The station has 4 points of entry/exit. Exit C is equipped with an elevator.

- A: Jihua 6th Road
- B: Jihua 6th Road
- C: Jihua 6th Road
- D: Jihua 6th Road

== History ==
During the early "eight-line planning" stage for Foshan Metro, this station has appeared as an interchange station for Lines 3 and 4. Line 3 was approved in November 2012, and the station was earmarked to be built as an intermediate station of Line 3.

On 30 December 2017, the intersection of Jihua 6th Road and Chao'an South Road, where the station is located, began to be enclosed for station construction. In January 2020, the base slab was sealed. In April 2021, the double line tunnel between this station and Zhen'an broke through. In May the same year, the double line tunnel between this station and Shencun station (now Yayi Park) broke through. On 7 June 2022, the road restoration work at the intersection of Chao'an South Road with Jihua 6th Road was completed and the intersection was reopened, which meant that the main construction of the station was completed.

The station was called TV Tower station during the planning and construction phase, but the station is about a kilometer away from the Foshan TV Tower in Wenhua Park, and the Line 4 station was planned to set up on the west side of the TV tower. Later, in 2022, the station name was proposed to be changed to Jihua Liulu station, named after Jihua Sixth Road where the station is located.
