= Sanshanxinchengnan station =

Nanhai Tram Line 1 (Foshan Metro) station

Sanshanxinchengnan 三山新城南
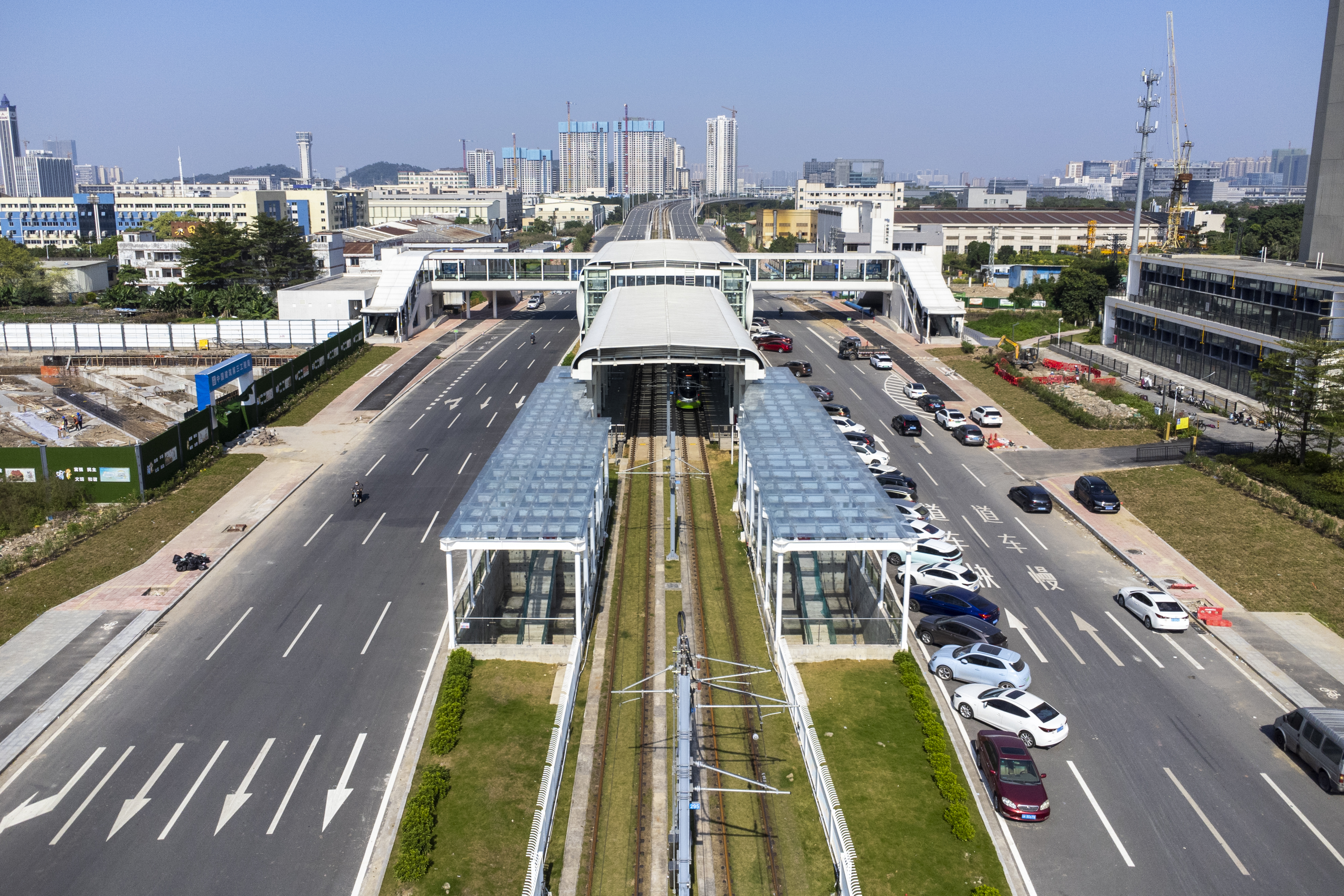
- Exterior

Chinese name
- Chinese: 三山新城南站
Transcriptions
Standard Mandarin
- Hanyu Pinyin: Sānshān Xīnchéng Nán Zhàn
Yue: Cantonese
- Yale Romanization: Sāamsāan Sānsìhng Nàahm Jaahm
- Jyutping: Saam^{1}saan^{1} San^{1}sing^{4} Naam^{4} Zaam^{6}

General information
- Location: North side of intersection of Taishan Road (泰山路) and Sanlongwan Avenue (三龙湾大道), Guicheng Subdistrict; Nanhai District, Foshan, Guangdong; China
- Coordinates: 23°0′39.02″N 113°13′44.04″E
- Operator: Foshan Metro Operation Co., Ltd.
- Lines: Nanhai Tram Line 1 Line 4 (future)
- Platforms: 2 (2 side platforms)
- Tracks: 2

Construction
- Structure type: At-grade
- Accessible: Yes

Other information
- Station code: TNH112

History
- Opened: 29 November 2022 (3 years ago)

Services
Preceding station	Foshan Metro	Following station
Wenhanhu Park (Ji Hua Laboratory) towards Leigang	Nanhai Tram Line 1	Linyuebei towards Linyuedong
Location

Sanshanxinchengnan station (Chinese: 三山新城南站; pinyin: Sānshān Xīnchéng Nán Zhàn; Cantonese Yale: Sāamsāan Sānsìhng Nàahm Jaahm; lit. 'Three Hills New Town South station') is a light metro station on Nanhai Tram Line 1 of Foshan Metro, located in Foshan's Nanhai District. It opened on 29 November 2022.

== Station layout ==
The station has two side platforms on Taishan Road.

F2; Concourse	Lobby	Ticket Machines, Customer Service, Police Station, Security Facilities, Exits A-D
G Platforms	Side platform, doors will open on the right, reserved transfer node
G Platforms	Platform 1	TNH1 towards Leigang (Wenhanhu Park (Ji Hua Laboratory))
G Platforms	Platform 2	TNH1 towards Linyuedong (Linyuebei)
G Platforms	Side platform, doors will open on the right, reserved transfer node
L1	Reserved concourse	4 reserved station structure
L2; Reserved Platforms		4 reserved track area
L2; Reserved Platforms	Reserved Island platform
L2; Reserved Platforms		4 reserved track area

=== Entrances/exits ===
The station has 4 points of entry/exit. All exits are equipped with elevators.

- A: Taishan Road
- B: Taishan Road
- C: Taishan Road
- D: Taishan Road
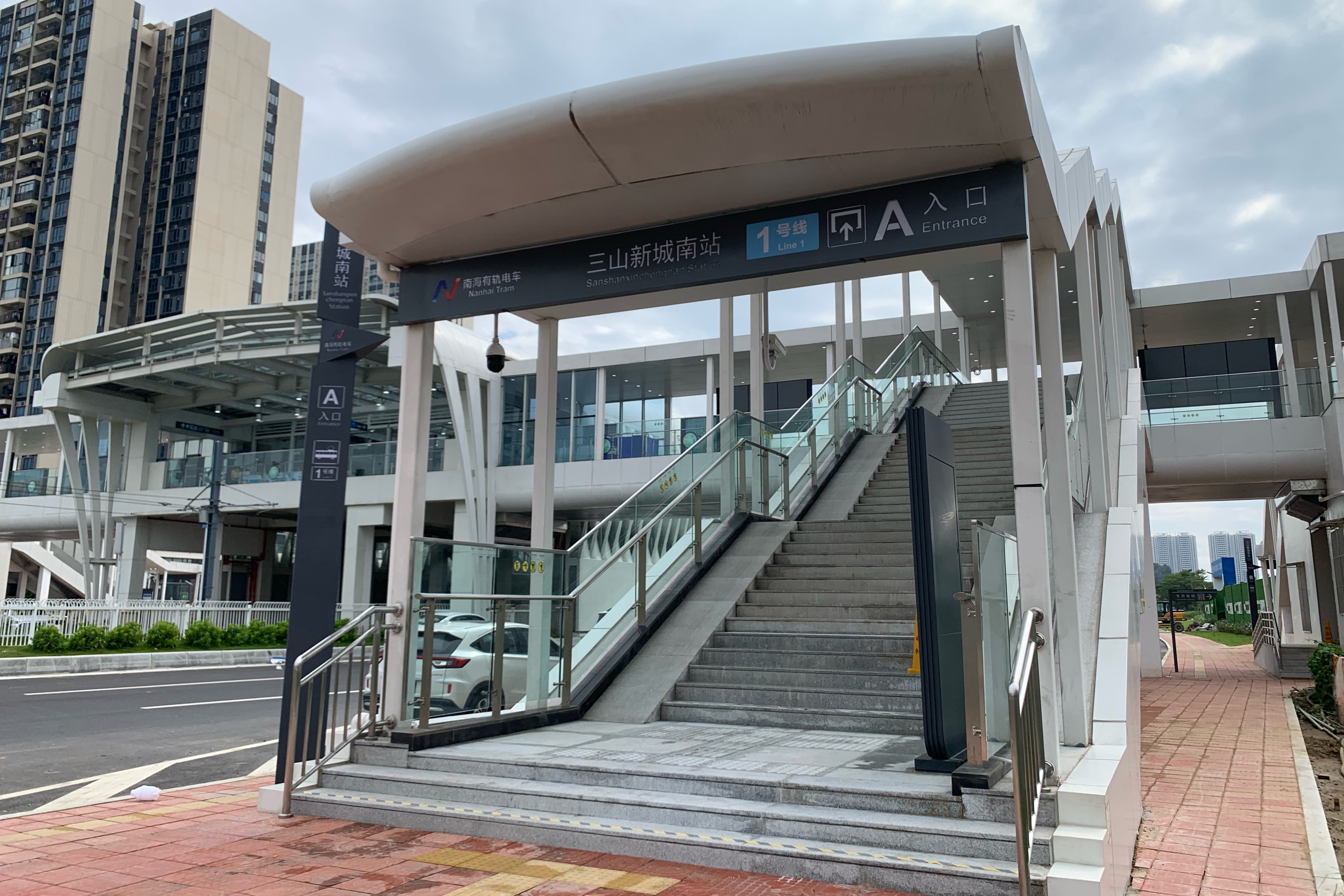
Entrance A

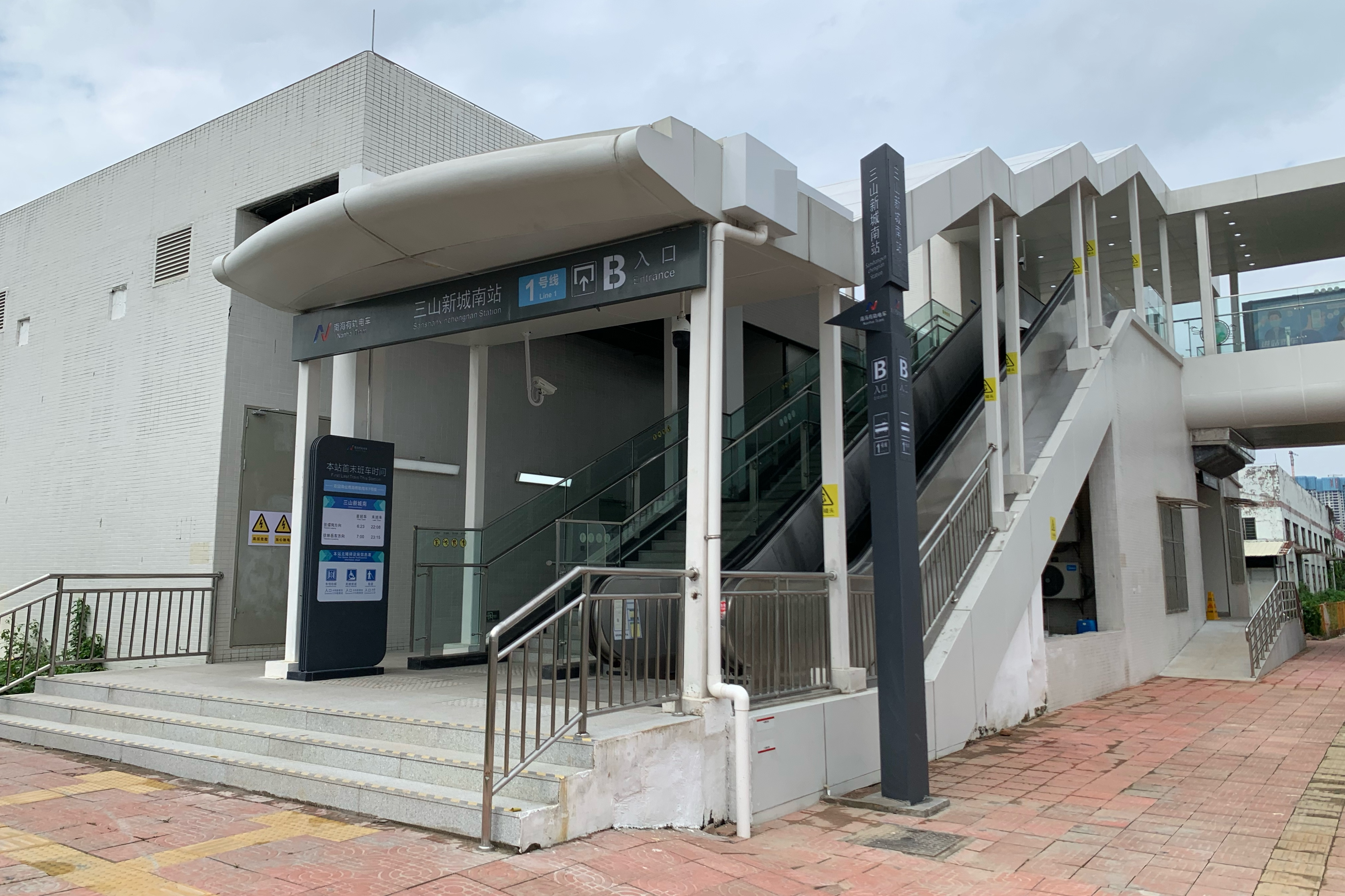
Entrance B

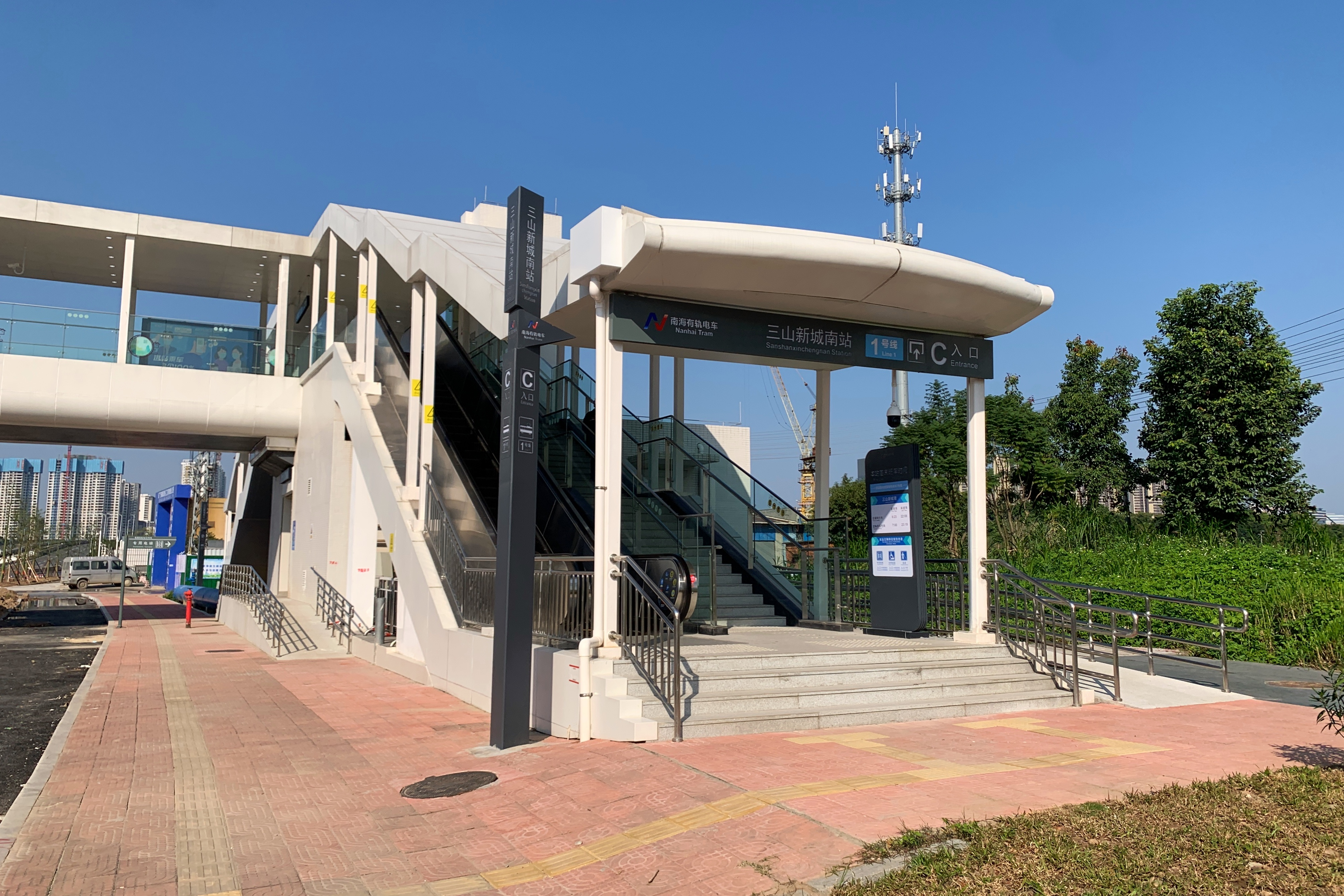
Entrance C

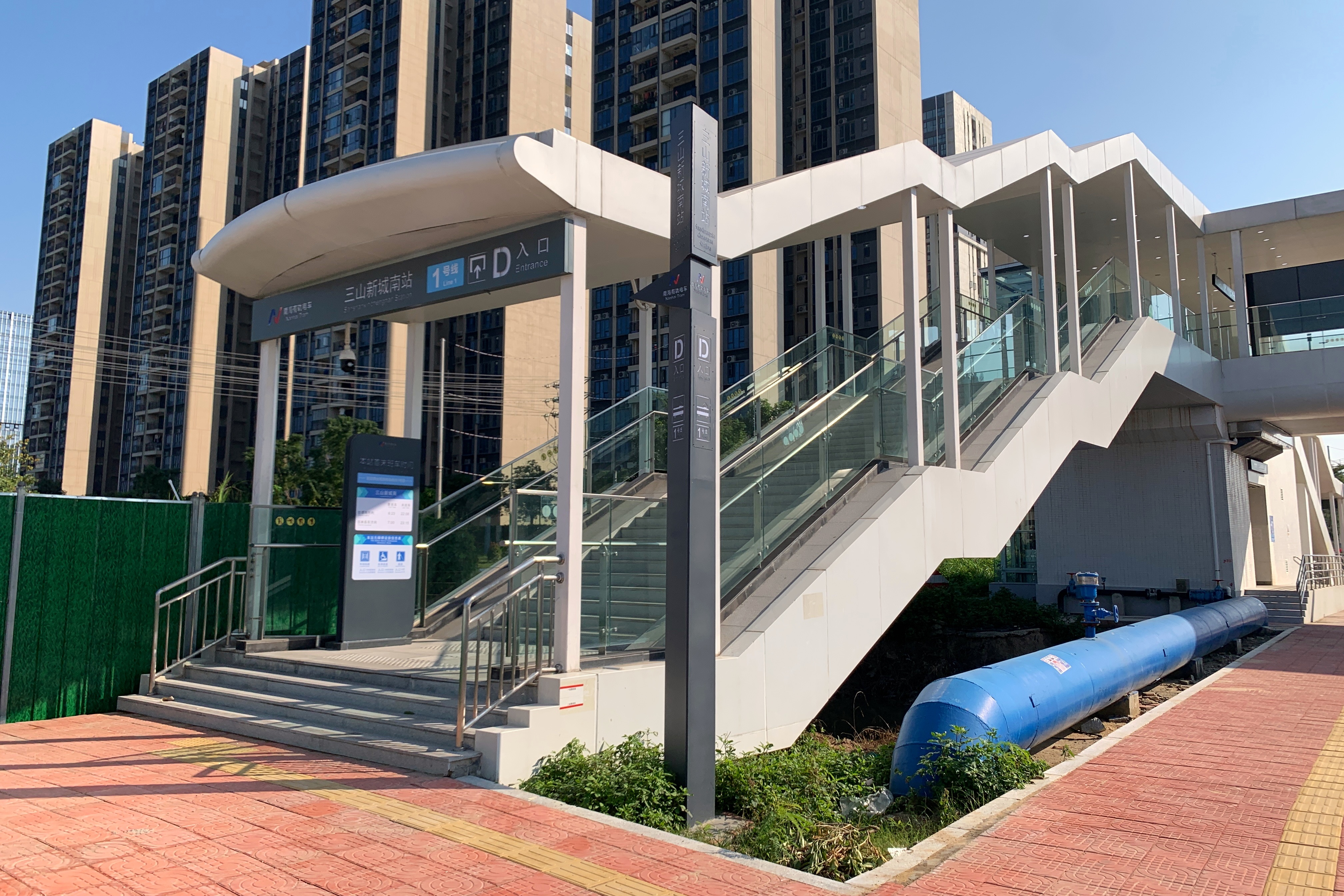
Entrance D

== Gallery ==
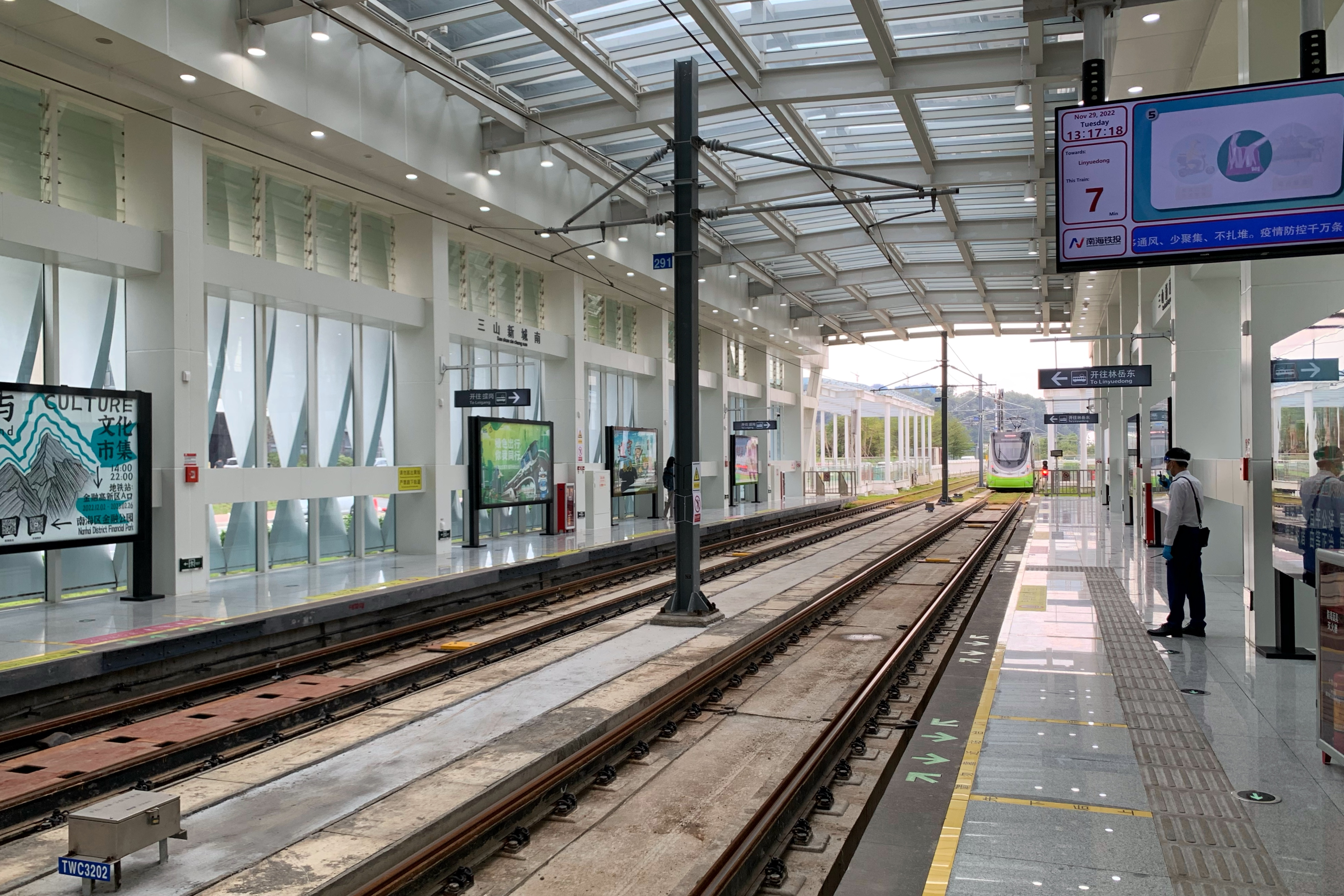
Platform

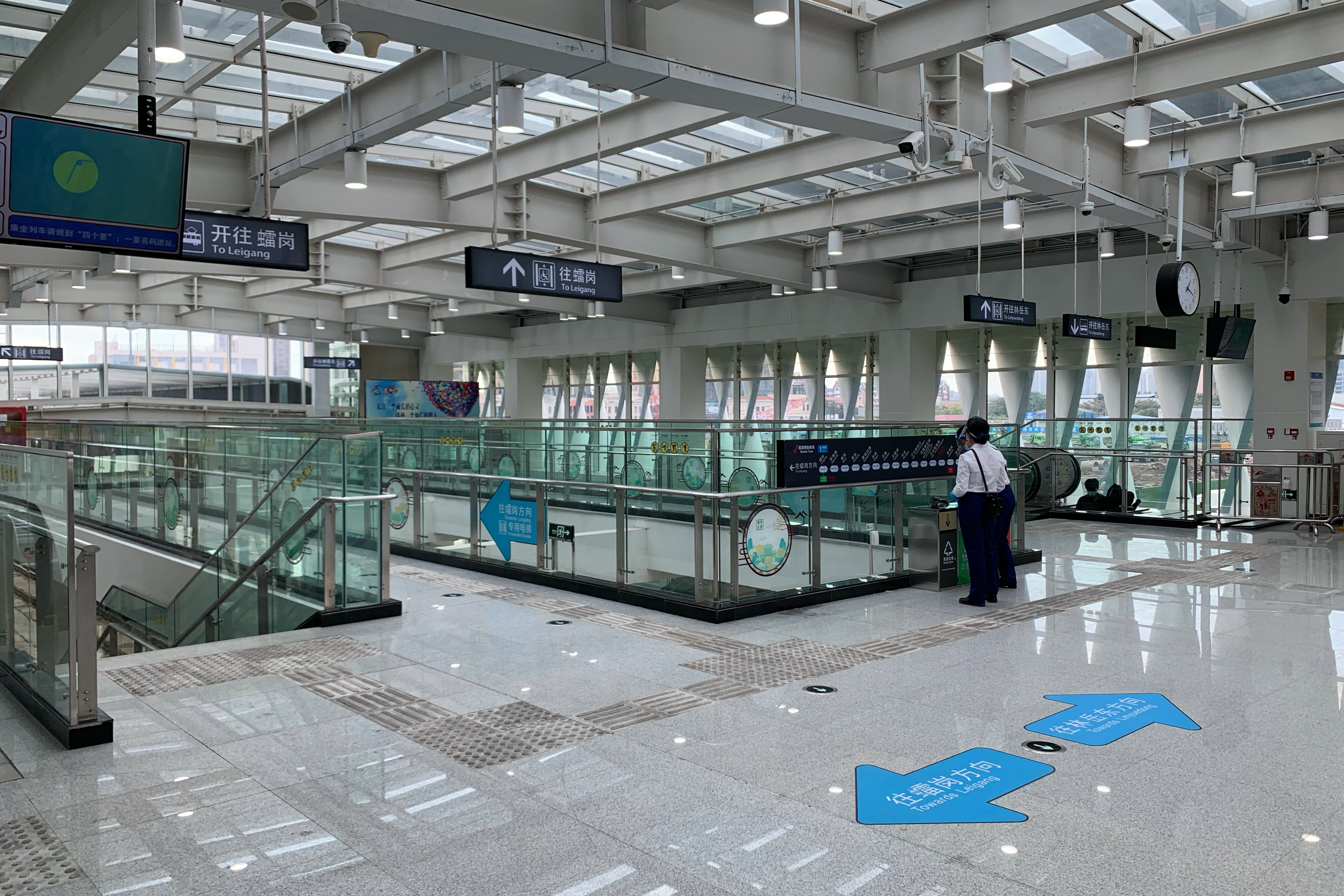
Concourse

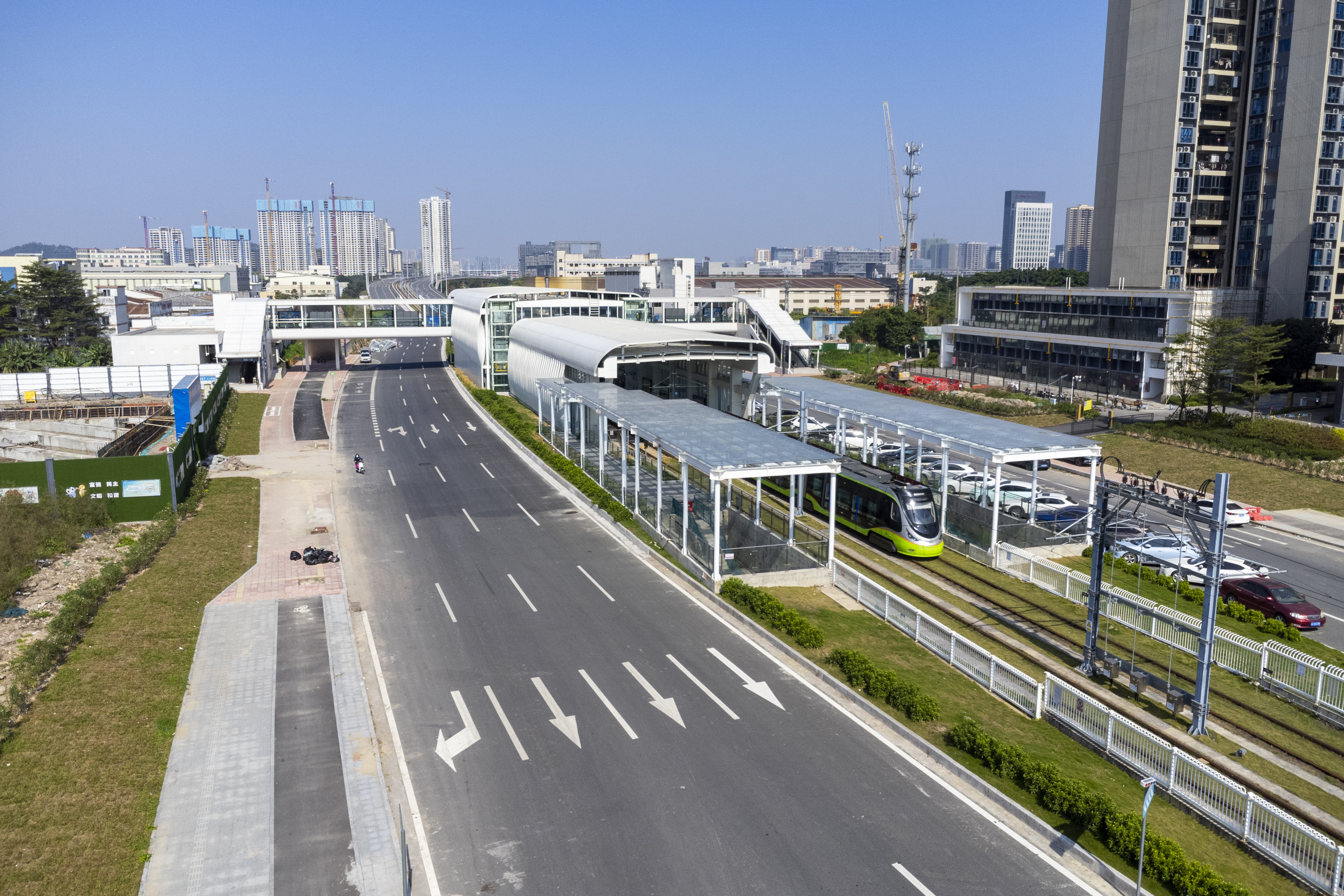
Platform exterior featuring Line 4 reserved transfer node (middle right)

== History ==
This station was originally planned to be a station on the initial section of Nanhai Tram Line 1, but it was later postponed to the remaining section due to the addition of Wenhanhu Park (Ji Hua Laboratory) station between here and Sanshanxinchengbei station. The initial section has therefore also been shortened from this station to Sanshanxinchengbei. On 29 November 2022, the station was opened with the opening of the remaining section of Nanhai Tram Line 1.

== Future development ==
The station is planned to have an interchange with Foshan Metro Line 4, and there are reserved transfer nodes visible on the platforms of Nanhai Tram Line 1.
