= Line 4 (Foshan Metro) =

Rapid transit line under construction in China

- 4

Overview
- Status: Under Construction
- Owner: Foshan Metro Group
- Locale: Foshan (Nanhai, Sanshui and Chancheng districts); Guangdong
- Termini: Beijiang Dadao (Phase 1); Gangkou Lu (Phase 1)
- Stations: 33

Service
- Type: Rapid transit
- System: Foshan Metro (FMetro)
- Services: 1

Technical
- Line length: 55.2 km (34.3 mi) (Phase 1)
- Number of tracks: 2
- Character: Underground and elevated
- Track gauge: 1,435 mm (4 ft 8 1/2 in)
- Operating speed: 100 km/h (62 mph)

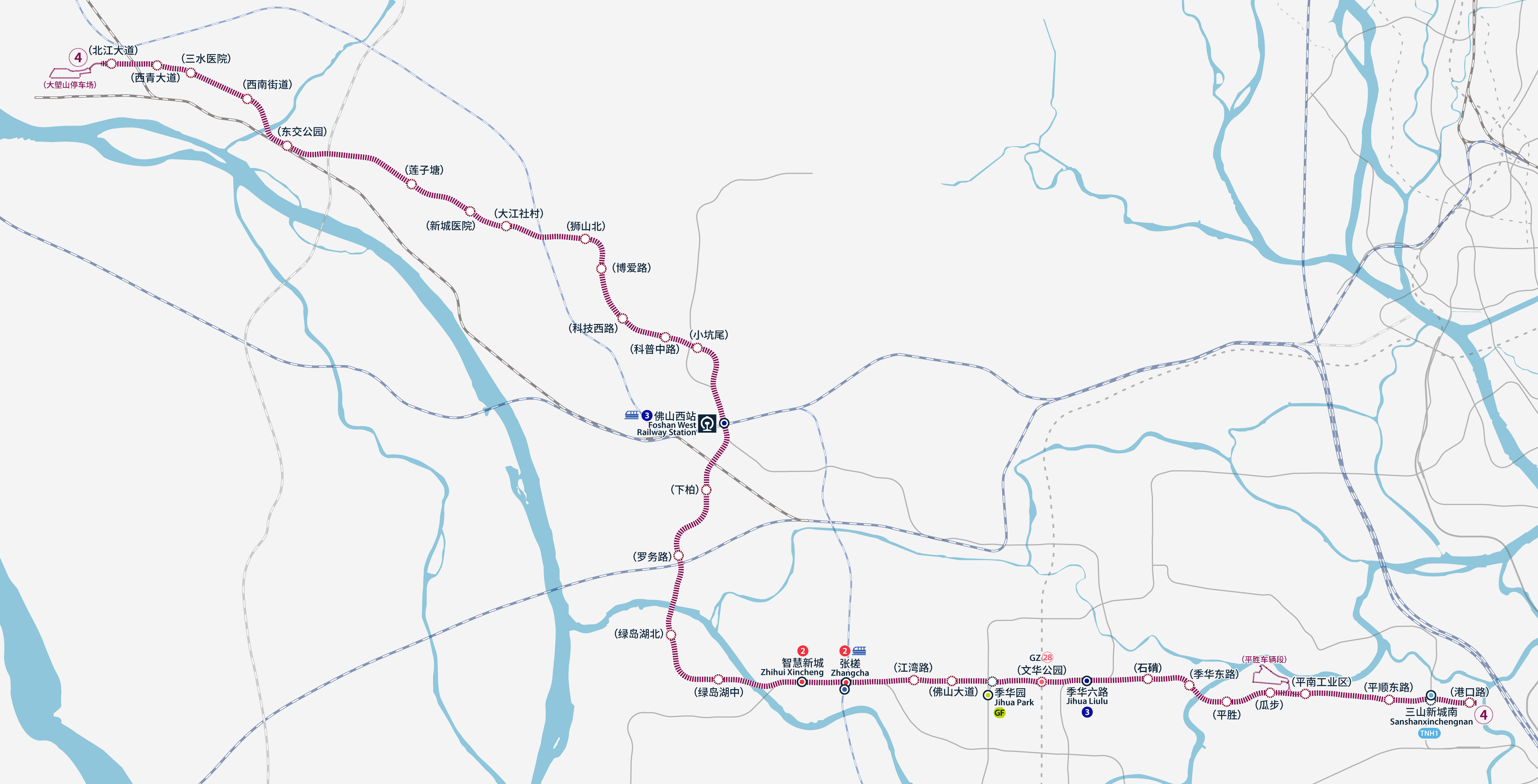
Map of Line 4 drawn to scale.

Line 4 of Foshan Metro (FMetro) (Chinese: 佛山地铁4号线; pinyin: Fóshān Dìtiě Sì Hào Xiàn) is a line under construction in Foshan. The first phase of the line will run in an L-shaped northwest-east direction, connecting Beijiang Dadao in Sanshui District with Gangkou Lu in Nanhai District, with 33 stations and 55.2 km (34.3 mi) kilometers of track. Construction started on 15 January 2022.

The line is expected to operate 6 car type B trains with a maximum speed of 100km/h, and will be fully automated and driverless.

== Stations (Phase 1) ==
Station name		Connections	Future Connections	Location
English	Chinese	Connections	Future Connections	Location
Beijiang Dadao	北江大道			Sanshui
Xiqing Dadao	西青大道			Sanshui
Sanshui Hospital	三水医院			Sanshui
Xinan Jiedao	西南街道			Sanshui
Dongjiao Park	东交公园			Sanshui
Lianzitang	莲子塘			Nanhai
Xincheng Hospital	新城医院			Nanhai
Dajiangshe Village	大江社村			Nanhai
Shishan Bei	狮山北			Nanhai
Bo'ai Lu	博爱路			Nanhai
Keji Xilu	科技西路			Nanhai
Kepu Zhonglu	科普中路			Nanhai
Xiaokengwei	小坑尾			Nanhai
Foshan West Railway Station	佛山西站	3 FOQ GZ		Nanhai
Xiabo	下柏			Nanhai
Luowu Lu	罗务路			Nanhai
Lvdao Lake North	绿岛湖北			Chancheng
Lvdao Lake Central	绿岛湖中			Chancheng
Zhihui Xincheng	智慧新城	2		Chancheng
Zhangcha	张槎	2		Chancheng
Jiangwan Lu	江湾路			Chancheng
Foshan Dadao	佛山大道			Chancheng
Jihua Park	季华园	Guangfo (Note: Will require an out-of-system interchange.)		Chancheng
Wenhua Park	文华公园		28	Chancheng
Jihua Liulu	季华六路	3		Chancheng
Shiken	石肯			Chancheng
Jihua Donglu	季华东路			Chancheng
Pingsheng	平胜			Nanhai
Guabu	瓜步			Nanhai
Pingnan Industrial Area	平南工业区			Nanhai
Pingsheng Donglu	平胜东路			Nanhai
Sanshanxinchengnan	三山新城南	TNH1		Nanhai
Gangkou Lu	港口路		11	Nanhai
