= Sanshanxinchengbei station =

Nanhai Tram Line 1 (Foshan Metro) station

Sanshanxinchengbei 三山新城北
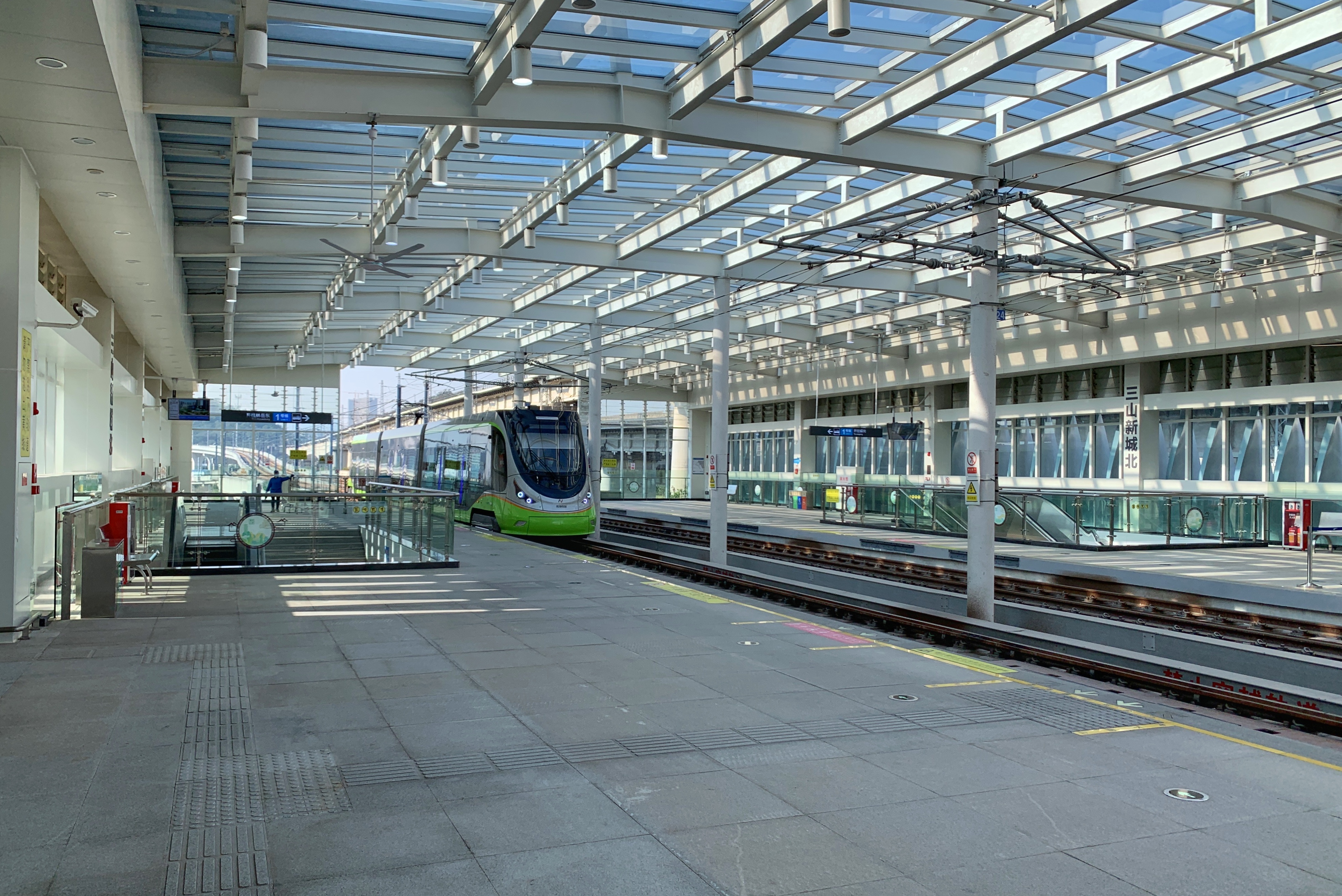
- Platform

Chinese name
- Chinese: 三山新城北站
Transcriptions
Standard Mandarin
- Hanyu Pinyin: Sānshān Xīnchéng Běi Zhàn
Yue: Cantonese
- Yale Romanization: Sāamsāan Sānsìhng Bāk Jaahm
- Jyutping: Saam^{1}saan^{1} San^{1}sing^{4} Bak^{1} Zaam^{6}

General information
- Location: South side of intersection of Taishan Road (泰山路) and Changjiang Road (长江路), Guicheng Subdistrict; Nanhai District, Foshan, Guangdong; China
- Coordinates: 23°1′32.84″N 113°13′45.88″E
- Operator: Foshan Metro Operation Co., Ltd.
- Line: Nanhai Tram Line 1
- Platforms: 2 (2 side platforms)
- Tracks: 2

Construction
- Structure type: Elevated
- Accessible: Yes

Other information
- Station code: TNH110

History
- Opened: 18 August 2021 (4 years ago)

Services
Preceding station	Foshan Metro	Following station
Zhongqu towards Leigang	Nanhai Tram Line 1	Wenhanhu Park (Ji Hua Laboratory) towards Linyuedong
Location

Sanshanxinchengbei station (Chinese: 三山新城北站; pinyin: Sānshān Xīnchéng Běi Zhàn; Cantonese Yale: Sāamsāan Sānsìhng Bāk Jaahm; lit. 'Three Hills New Town North station') is a light metro station on Nanhai Tram Line 1 of Foshan Metro, located in Foshan's Nanhai District. It opened on 18 August 2021, and served as the initial eastern terminus of the line until the remaining section to Linyuedong opened on 29 November 2022.

== Station layout ==
The station has two side platforms, located above the south side of the tracks of the Guiguang and Nanguang high-speed railways.

F2; Platforms	Side platform, doors will open on the right
F2; Platforms	Platform 1	TNH1 towards Leigang (Zhongqu)
F2; Platforms	Platform 2	TNH1 towards Linyuedong (Wenhanhu Park (Ji Hua Laboratory))
F2; Platforms	Side platform, doors will open on the right
F2; Platforms	Exit C	Ticket Machines, Customer Service, Security Facilities
G Concourse	Lobby	Ticket Machines, Customer Service, Security Facilities, Toilets, Exits A & B

=== Entrances/exits ===
The station has 3 points of entry/exit, of which Exits A and B are located on surface level, whilst Exit C is on the second floor connecting with platform 2. Exit C is accessible.

- A: Changjiang Road
- B: Changjiang Road
- C: Vanke Sky City
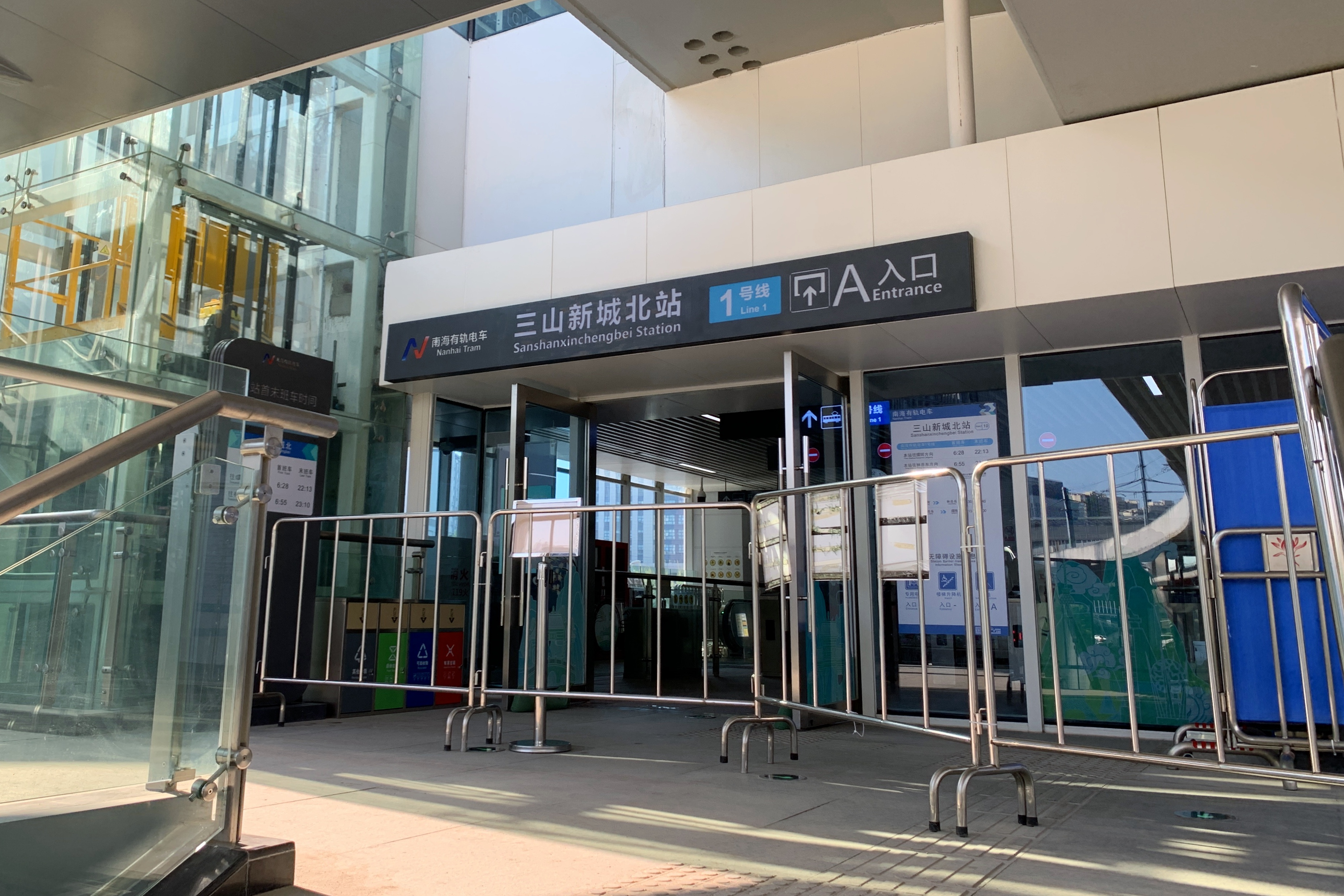
Entrance A

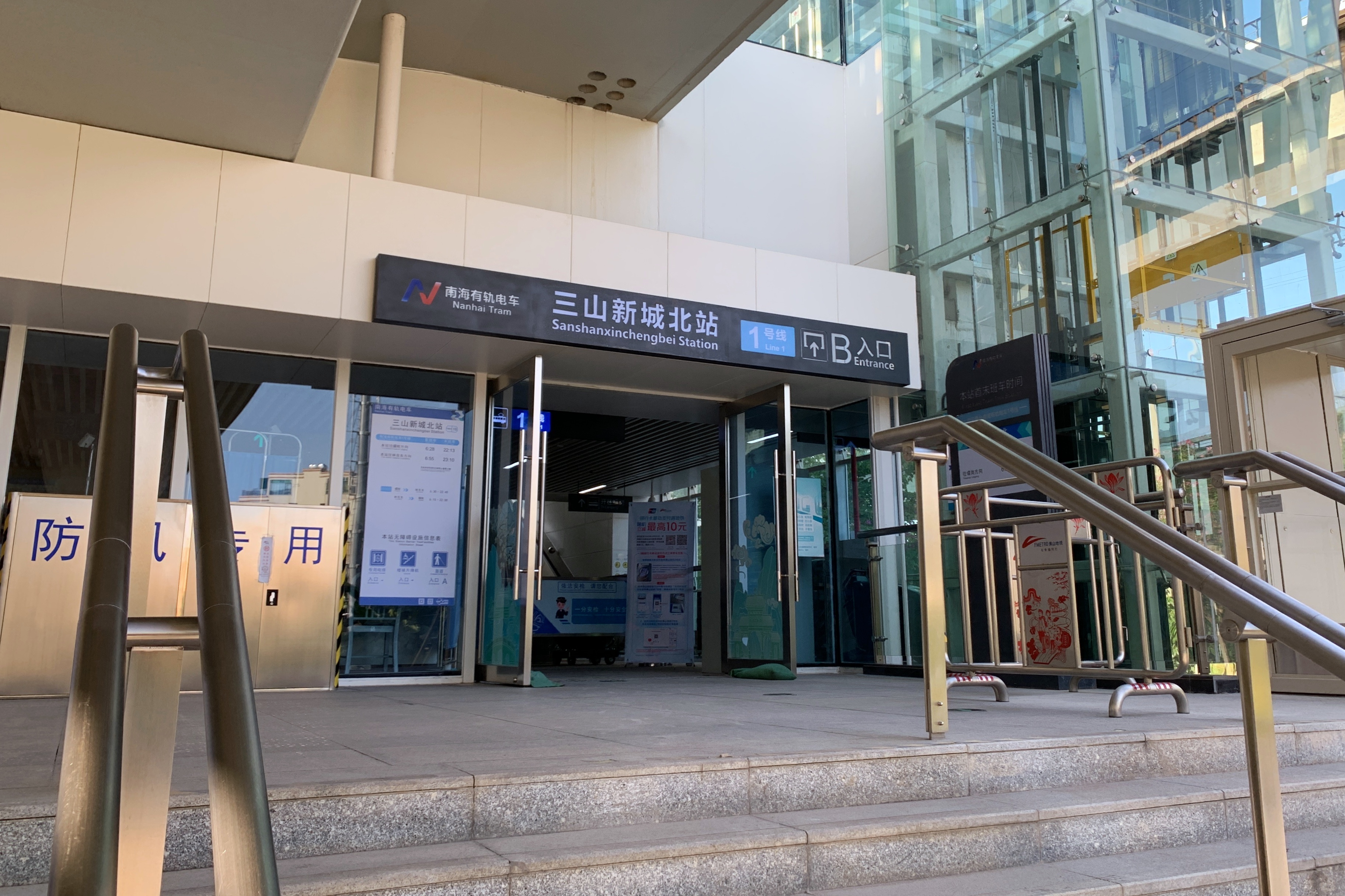
Entrance B

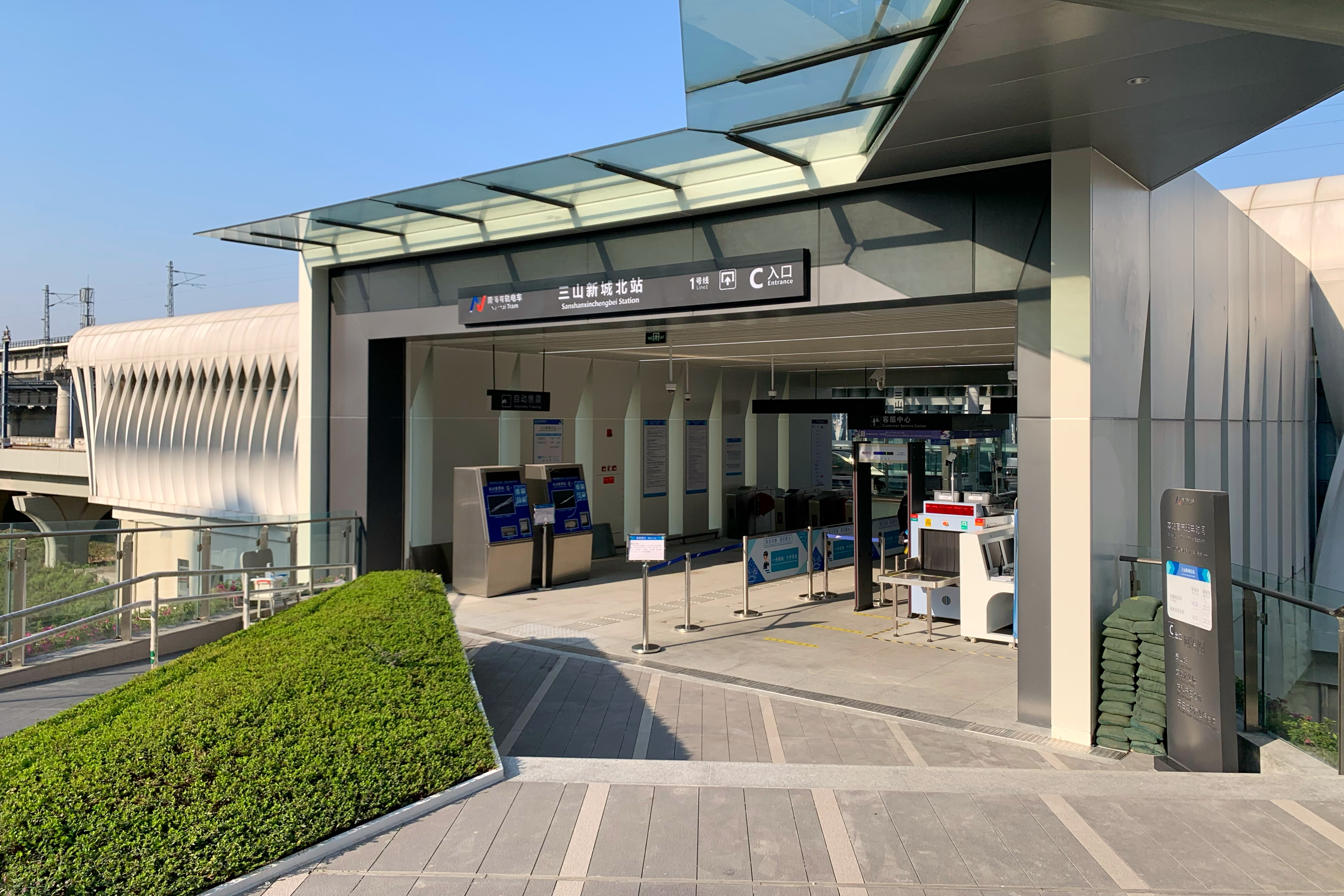
Entrance C

== History ==
This station was originally planned to be a through station on the initial section of Nanhai Tram Line 1, but it became the southeastern terminus of the initial section due to the addition of Wenhanhu Park (Ji Hua Laboratory) station between here and Sanshanxinchengnan station.

The station opened on 18 August 2021. On 29 November 2022, the remaining section opened, which meant this station became a through station. At the same time, Exit C for Vanke Sky City, the property estate above Huandao Depot (depot for Nanhai Tram Line 1), was opened.
