= Foshan Metro =

Metro system of the city of Foshan in Guangdong Province, China

Foshan Metro (FMetro)

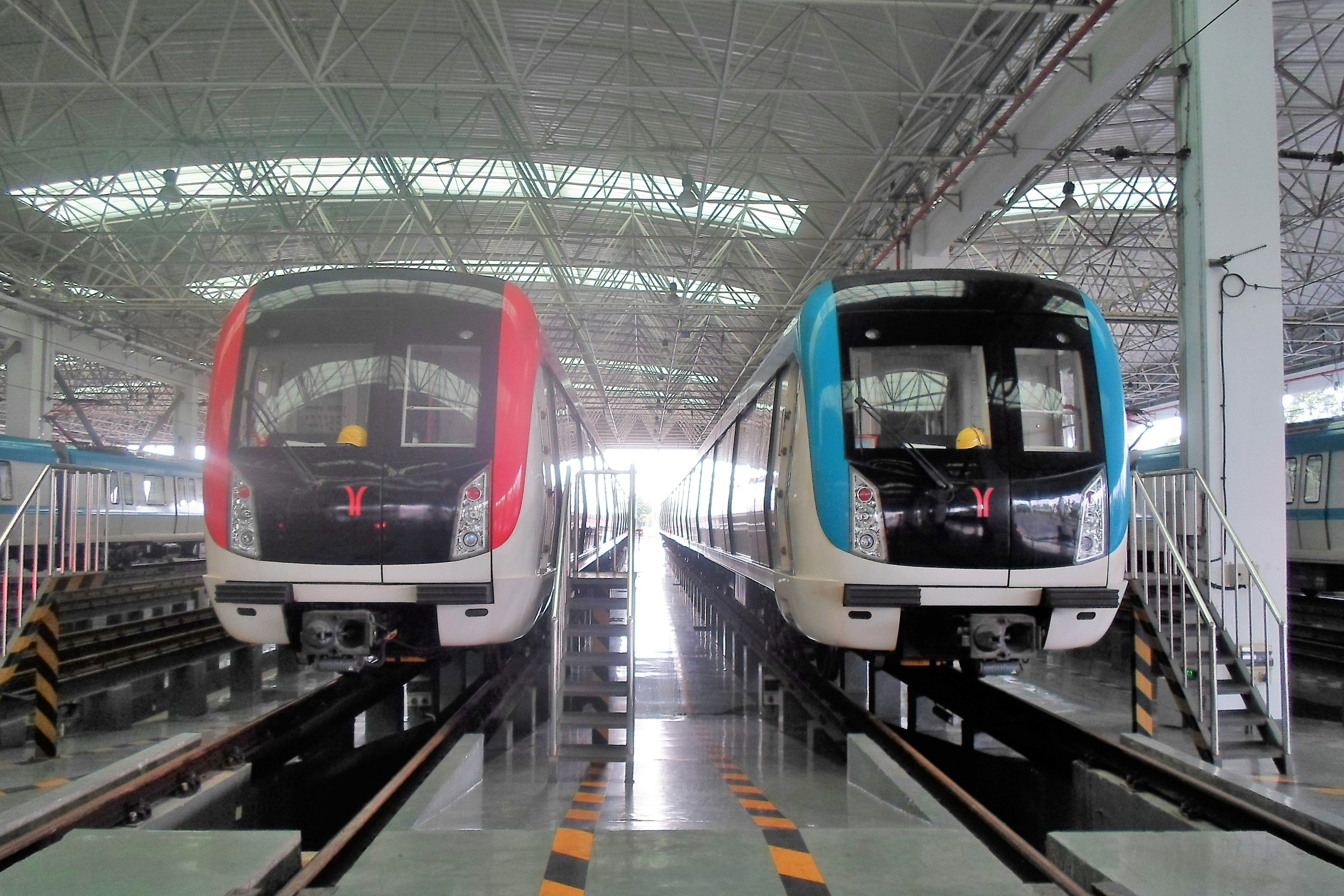
- A Guangfo line trains at depot

Overview
- Owner: City of Foshan
- Locale: Foshan & Guangzhou
- Transit type: Rapid transit
- Number of lines: 3
- Number of stations: 76
- Website: www.fmetro.net

Operation
- Began operation: 3 November 2010; 16 years ago
- Operator: Foshan Metro Group

Technical
- System length: 138.1 km (85.8 mi)
- Track gauge: 1,435 mm (4 ft 8 1/2 in)
- Electrification: Overhead lines

Foshan Metro
- Traditional Chinese: 佛山地鐵
- Simplified Chinese: 佛山地铁
Transcriptions
Standard Mandarin
- Hanyu Pinyin: Fóshān Dìtiě
Yue: Cantonese
- Yale Romanization: Fahtsāan Deihtit
- Jyutping: Fat^{6}saan^{1} Dei^{6}tit^{3}

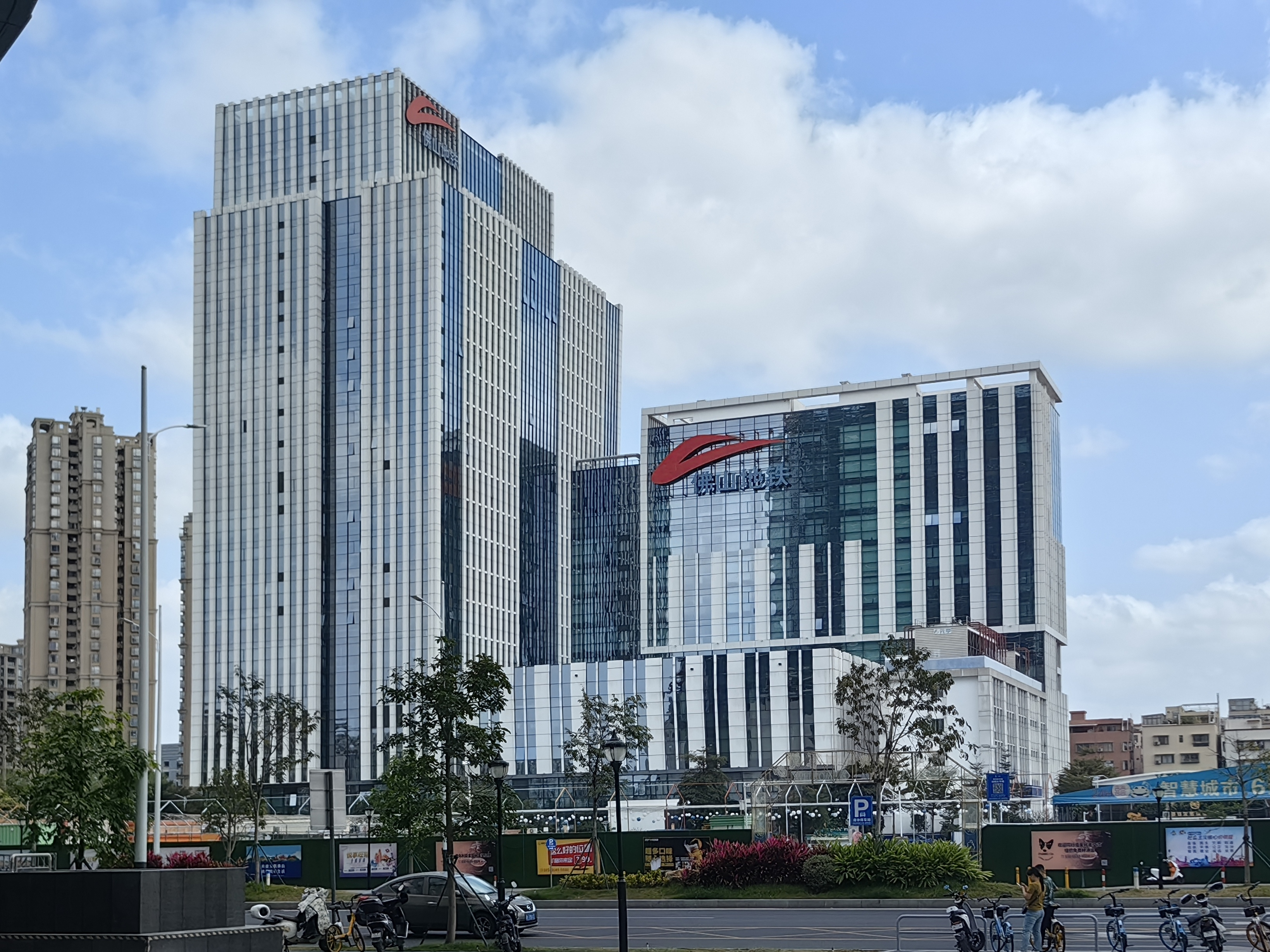
Foshan Metro Headquarters

The Foshan Metro (Chinese: 佛山地铁; branded as FMetro) is the rapid transit system of the city of Foshan in Guangdong, China. Guangfo line is operated by Guangzhou Metro Corporation, and all other lines are operated by the state-owned Foshan Metro Group. It is the tenth metro system to be built in mainland China. Construction began in 2002 and the first line opened on 3 November 2010. The metro system has two new lines, and Line 4 is under construction. Line 11 and the western extension of Line 2 are under planning.

== Lines in operation ==
The current urban rail transit network map of Guangzhou and Foshan
Line	Terminals (District)		Commencement	Newest Extension	Length km	Stations	Depots/ Stabling Sidings
Guangfo ( 1 )	Xincheng Dong (Shunde)	Lijiao (Haizhu, Guangzhou)	November 3, 2010	December 28, 2018	39.6	25	Xianan
2	Nanzhuang (Chancheng)	Guangzhou South Railway Station (Panyu, Guangzhou)	December 28, 2021	—	32.4	17	Huchong; Linyue
3	Shunde College Railway Station (Shunde)	Foshan University (Nanhai)	December 28, 2022	June 18, 2026	66.1	37	Fengsha; Beijiao
Total					138.1	76	

=== Guangfo Line (Line 1) ===
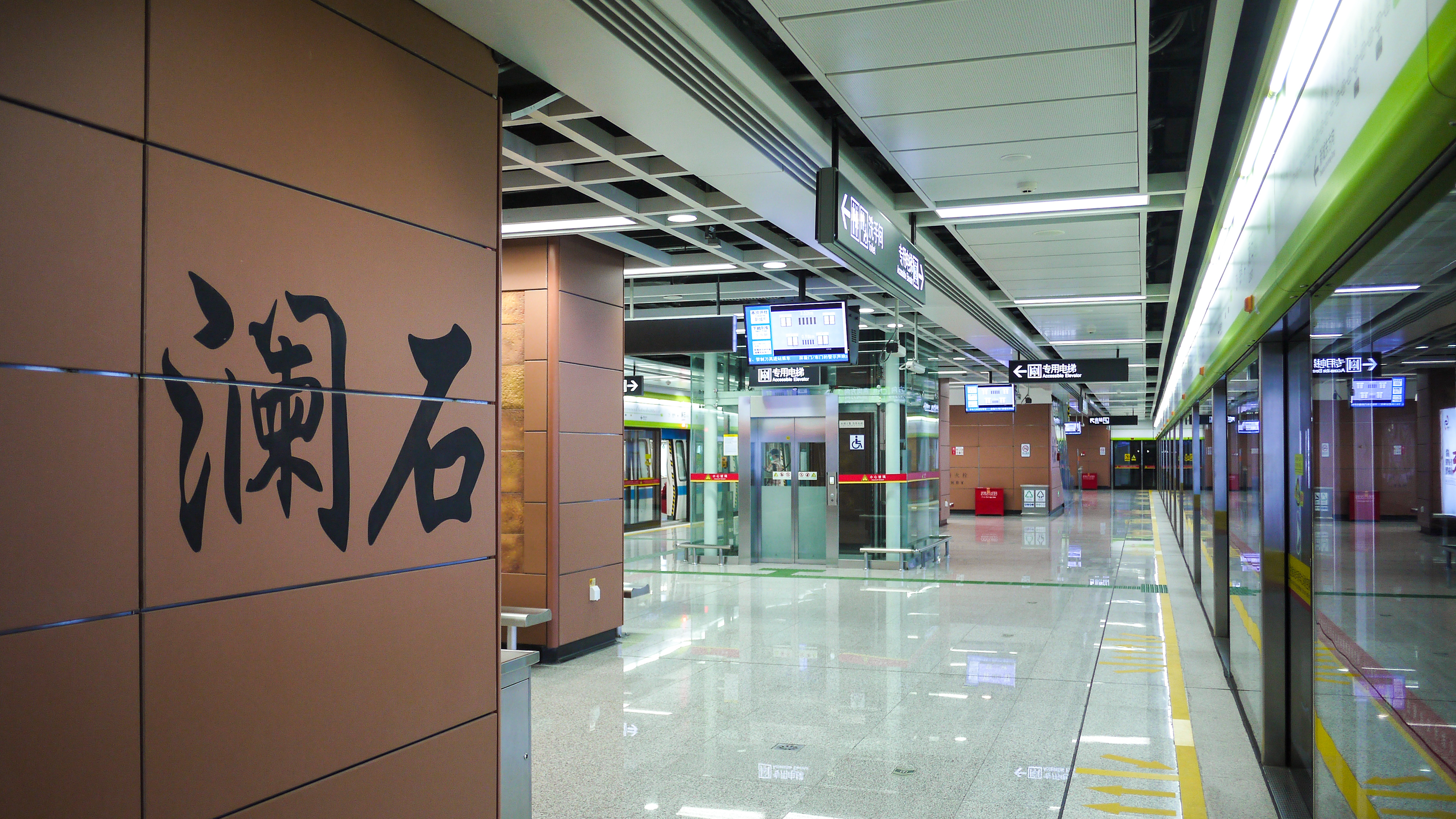
Platform 2 of Lanshi station, for Guangfo Line.

Line 1, also known as the Guangfo line, is a fully underground 39.6 km (24.6 mi) long intercity metro line that connects Guangzhou and Foshan. The line is owned by Guangdong Guangfo Inter-City Co., Ltd., a subsidiary co-owned by Guangzhou Metro (51%) and FMetro (49%), and currently operated by Guangzhou Metro Corporation. The first section of the line, from Xilang to Kuiqi Lu in Foshan, opened for operation in November 2010. The most recent extension from Yangang to Lijiao was opened on 28 December 2018. The Guangfo Line's color is yellowish green.

=== Line 2 ===
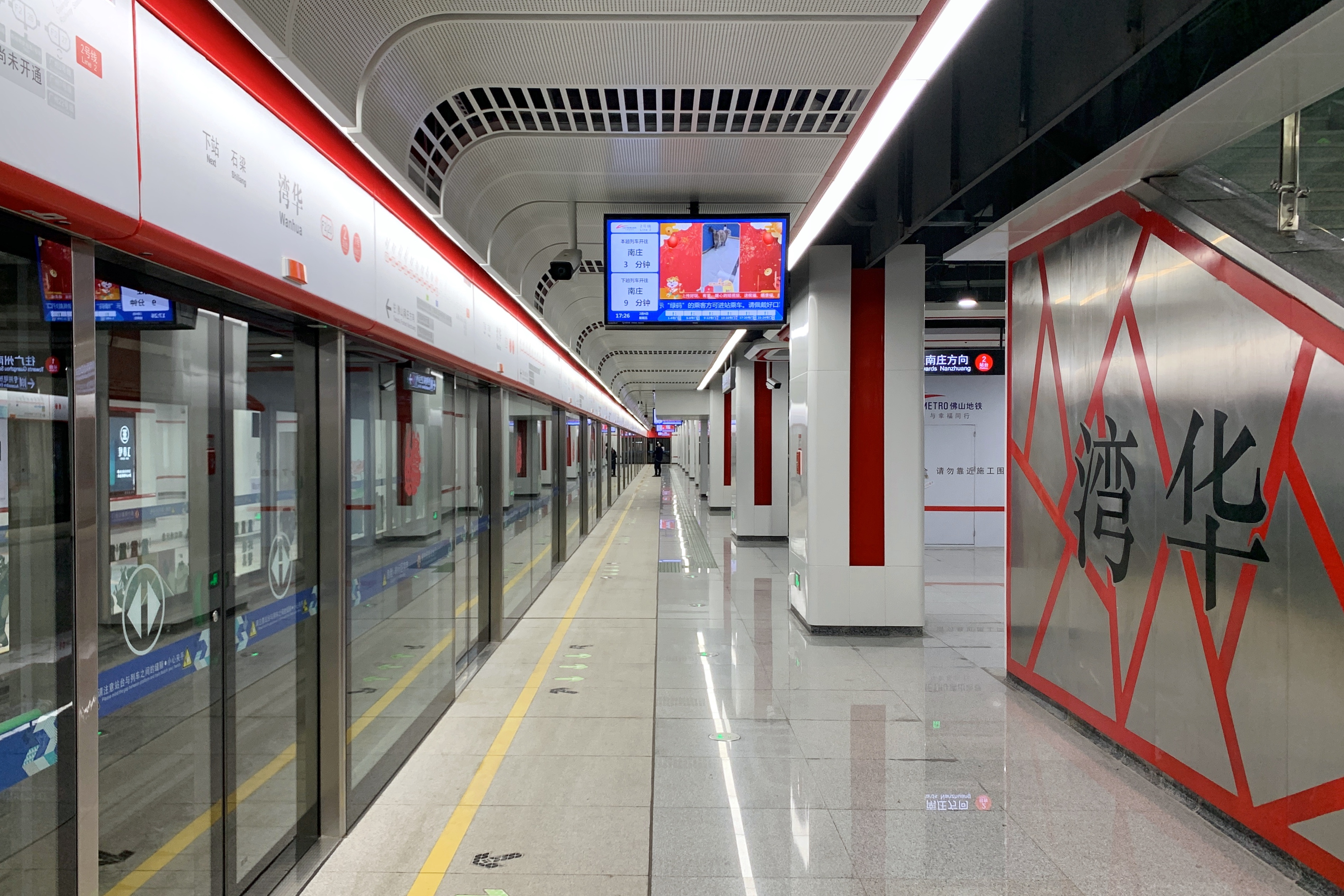
Platform 2 of Wanhua station, for Line 2.

Line 2 is a 32.4 km (20.1 mi) long line that runs from Guangzhou South railway station to its current western terminus, Nanzhuang. Line 2 was independently invested, constructed and operated by FMetro. The first and currently open phase of Line 2 began construction in 2014 and was opened on 28 December 2021. The second phase, a 23.5 km (14.6 mi) westerly extension into Gaoming District has been approved by the NDRC for construction. Line 2's color is red.

=== Line 3 ===
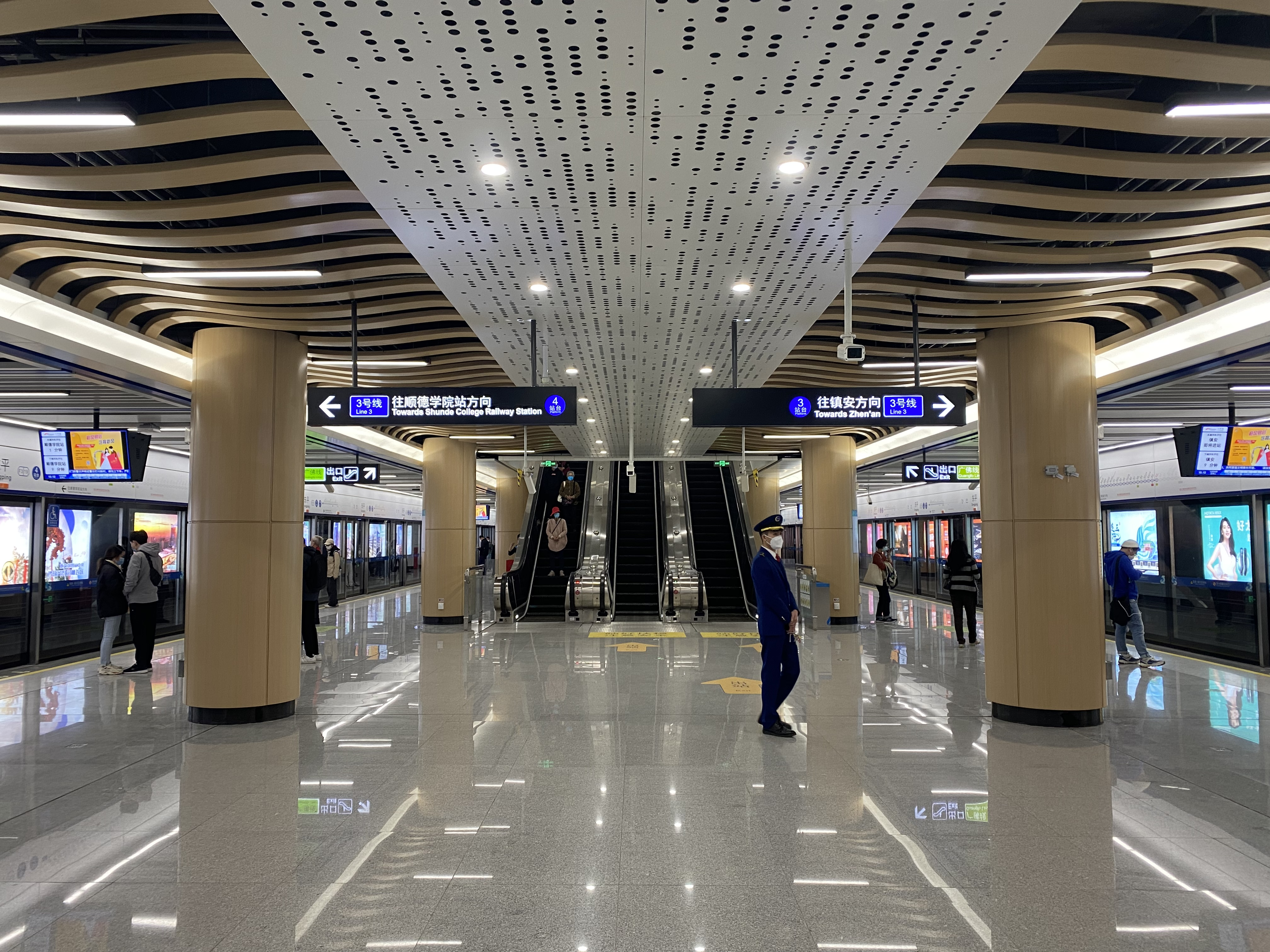
Platforms 3 and 4 of Dongping station, for Line 3.

Line 3 currently runs 66.1 km (41.1 mi) km from Shunde College Railway Station in Shunde District north to Foshan University in Nanhai District. Most of its 36 stations are underground, with 2 stations elevated. The initial section of Line 3's first phase opened on 28 December 2022. The rest of the first phase extending the line to Foshan University station opened on 23 August 2024 without a small section at Foshan railway station between Zhongshan Park and Lianhe, which opened later on 18 June 2026. Line 3's color is deep blue.

== Lines under construction and future expansions ==
=== Expansion plans ===
The planned urban rail transit network map of Guangzhou and Foshan in the future
Expansion plans
Opening	Line		Terminals		Length (km)	Stations	Status
TBD	Line 3	Remaining section	Shunde College Railway Station	Shunde Port	2.88	1	Pending
TBD	Line 4	Phase 1	Beijiang Dadao	Gangkou Lu	55.2	33	Under construction
TBD	Line 11		Xijiao	Hedong East	36.3	18	Approved by the NDRC
TBD	Line 2	Phase II	Xi'an	Nanzhuang	23.5	10	Approved by the NDRC

== Finances ==
=== Fares ===
There was a debate between Foshan and Guangzhou over fares of Guangfo Metro. The debate has since been settled as Foshan accepted Guangzhou's fare proposal. FMetro gave out 16,000 tickets for free when it first began operating in November 2010.

Distance (km)	Fares (RMB)
0~4	2 RMB for first 4 km (2.5 mi)
4~12	+1 RMB for each 4 km (2.5 mi)
12~24	+1 RMB for each 8 km (5.0 mi)
over 24	+1 RMB for each 8 km (5.0 mi)

=== Issues ===
Low ridership and a lack of alternative revenue (over 75% of 2024 income came from fares, while other cities in China have greater revenue shares from real estate and commercial operations around stations) have led to the system running continual losses despite government subsidies. This led to Foshan Metro group cutting operating hours and train frequencies on Line 2 in March 2025, which were later extended to all lines in May along with powering off some escalators and lights as well as setting air-conditioning to "energy-saving mode".

== Supplementary tram lines ==
=== Nanhai Tram Line 1 ===
Nanhai Tram Line 1 (Chinese: 南海有轨电车1号线) or Nanhai New Transit (Chinese: 南海新交通) is a light metro line in Nanhai District, Foshan. The line uses light rail vehicles but has a completely grade-separated right-of-way and large, metro-style stations with platform screen doors when underground. Construction started in January 2014. The section from Leigang to Sanshanxinchengbei opened on 18 August 2021, and the section from Sanshanxinchengbei to Linyuedong opened on 29 November 2022.

== See also ==
- Guangzhou Metro
- Dongguan Rail Transit
- Shenzhen Metro
- Hong Kong MTR
- List of rapid transit systems
- List of metro systems
- Urban rail transit in China
- Metro systems by annual passenger rides
