= Shizhou station =

Foshan Metro Line 2 station

Shizhou 石洲
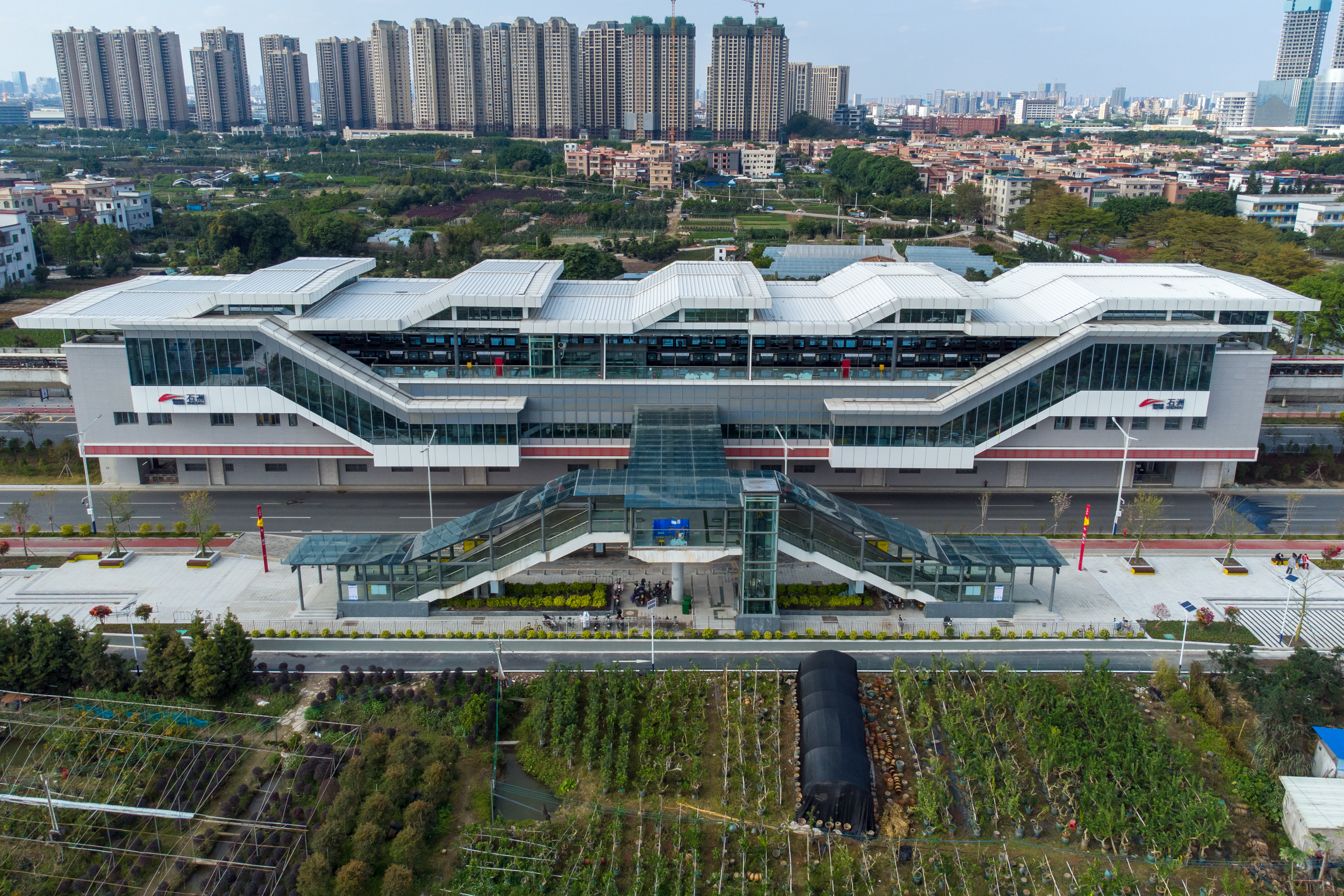
- Exterior

Chinese name
- Chinese: 石洲站
Transcriptions
Standard Mandarin
- Hanyu Pinyin: Shízhōu Zhàn
Yue: Cantonese
- Yale Romanization: Sehkjāu Jaahm
- Jyutping: Sek^{6}zau^{1} Zaam^{6}

General information
- Location: Wendeng Road (文登路) near Shizhou School (石洲学校), Chencun; Shunde District, Foshan, Guangdong; China
- Coordinates: 22°59′35.97″N 113°12′38.86″E
- Operator: Foshan Metro Operation Co., Ltd.
- Line: Line 2
- Platforms: 2 (2 side platforms)
- Tracks: 2

Construction
- Structure type: Elevated
- Accessible: Yes

Other information
- Station code: F224

History
- Opened: 28 December 2021 (4 years ago)

Services
| Preceding station | Foshan Metro | Following station |
|---|---|---|
| Xianchong towards Nanzhuang | Line 2 | Linyue Xi towards Guangzhou South Railway Station |
Location

Shizhou station (Chinese: 石洲站; pinyin: Shízhōu Zhàn; Cantonese Yale: Sehkjāu Jaahm) is an elevated station on Line 2 of Foshan Metro, located in Foshan's Shunde District. It opened on 28 December 2021.

== Station layout ==
The station has two side platforms above Wendeng Road. East of the station are connecting lines to Linyue Depot.

| F3; Platforms | Side platform, doors will open on the right |
| F3; Platforms | Platform 2 | 2 towards Nanzhuang (Xianchong) |
| F3; Platforms | Platform 1 | 2 towards Guangzhou South Railway Station (Linyue Xi) |
| F3; Platforms | Side platform, doors will open on the right |
| F2; Concourse | Lobby | Ticket Machines, Customer Service, Police Station, Security Facilities |
| G | - | Exits A & B |

=== Entrances/exits ===
The station has 4 points of entry/exit. Exit A2 is equipped with an elevator.

- A1: Wendeng Road
- A2: Wendeng Road
- B1, B2: Wendeng Road
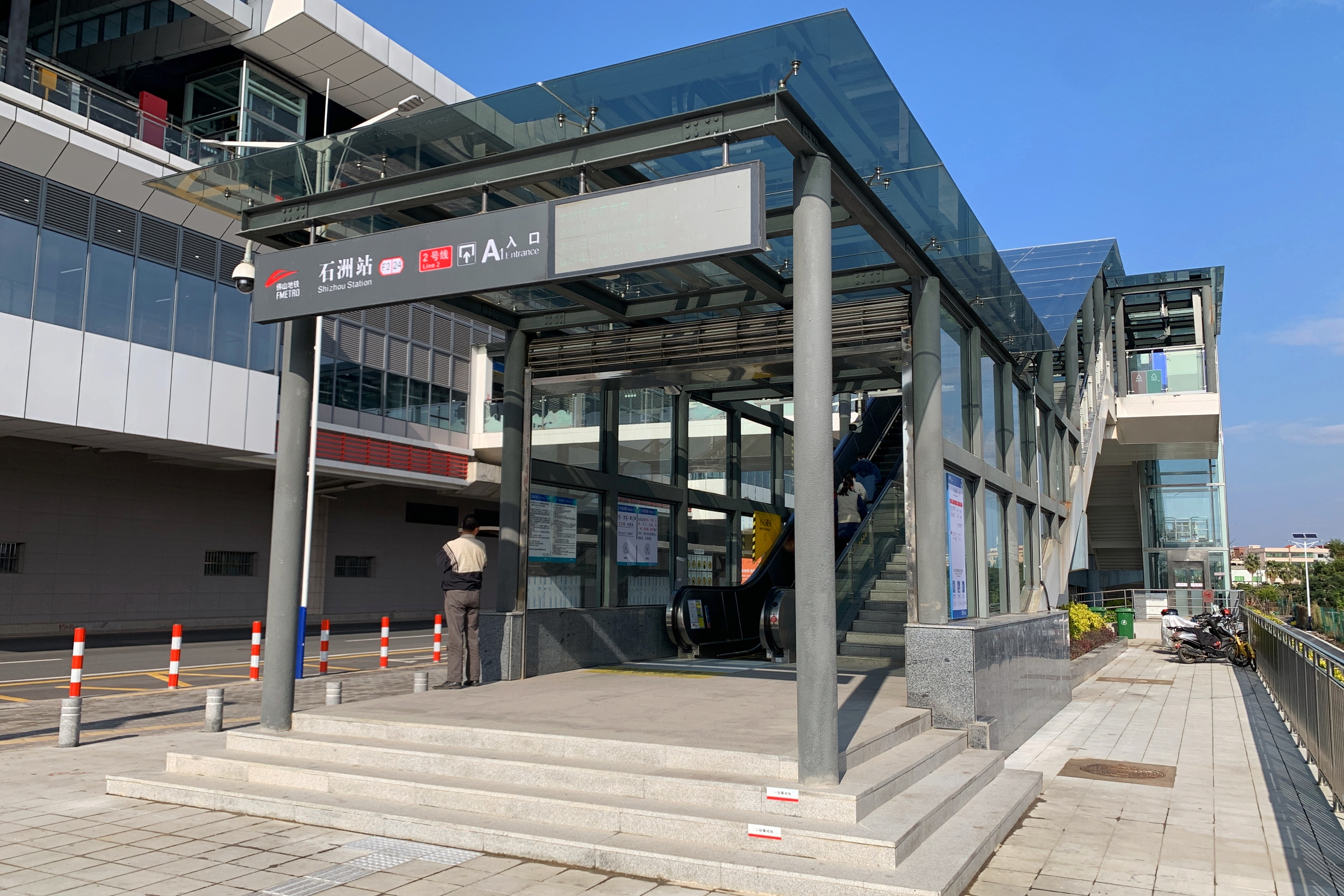
Entrance A1

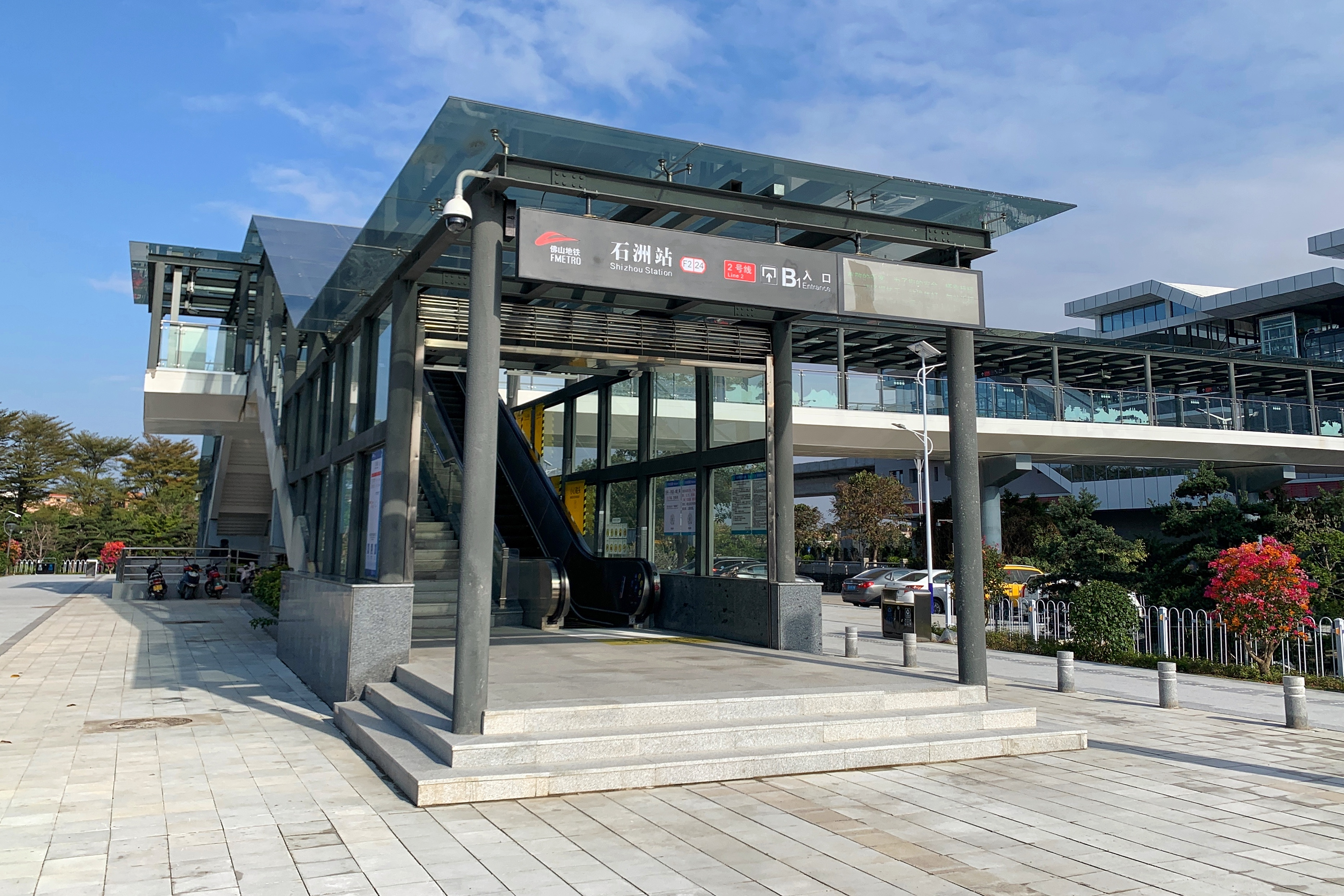
Entrance B1

== Gallery ==
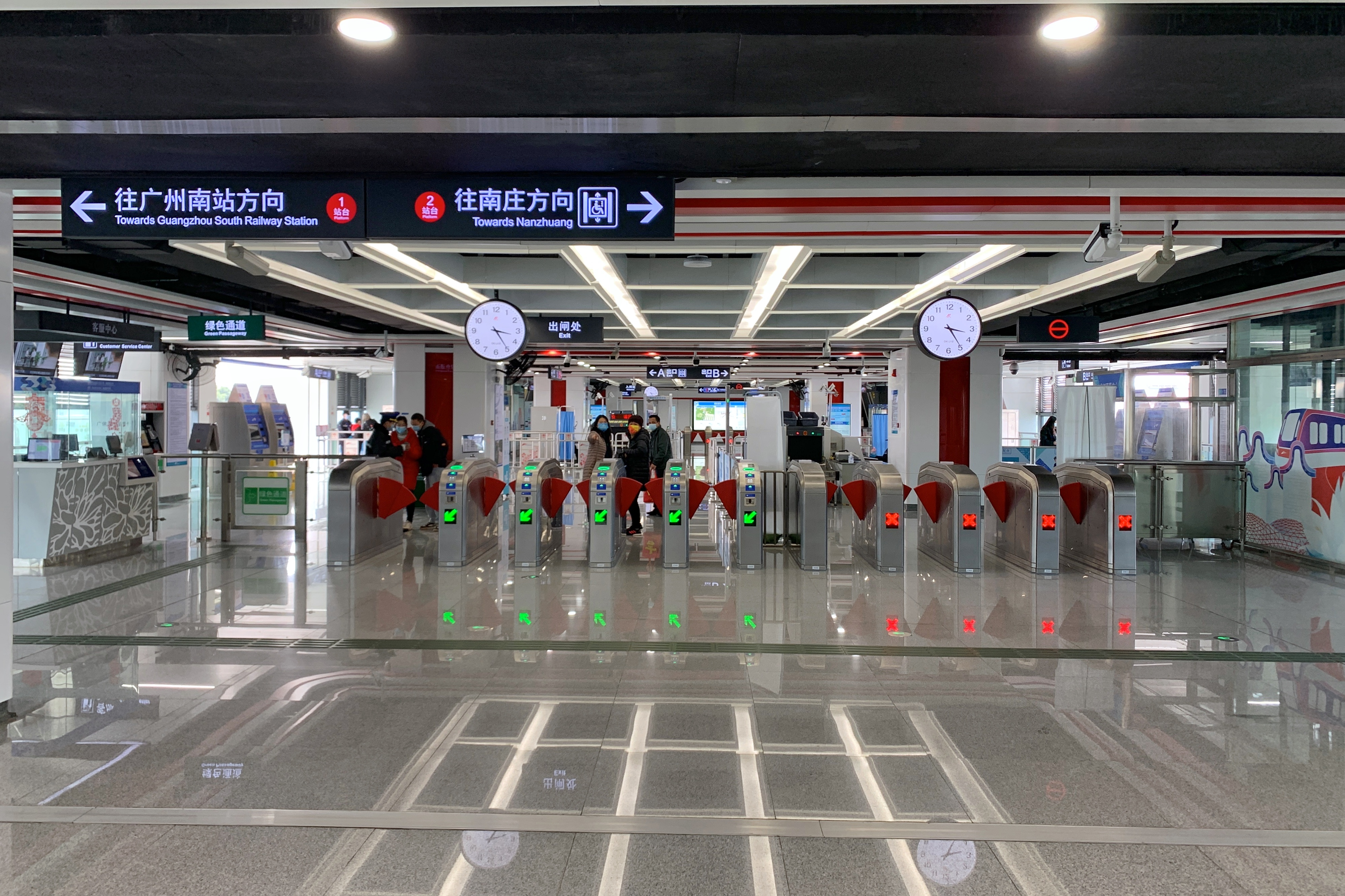
Concourse

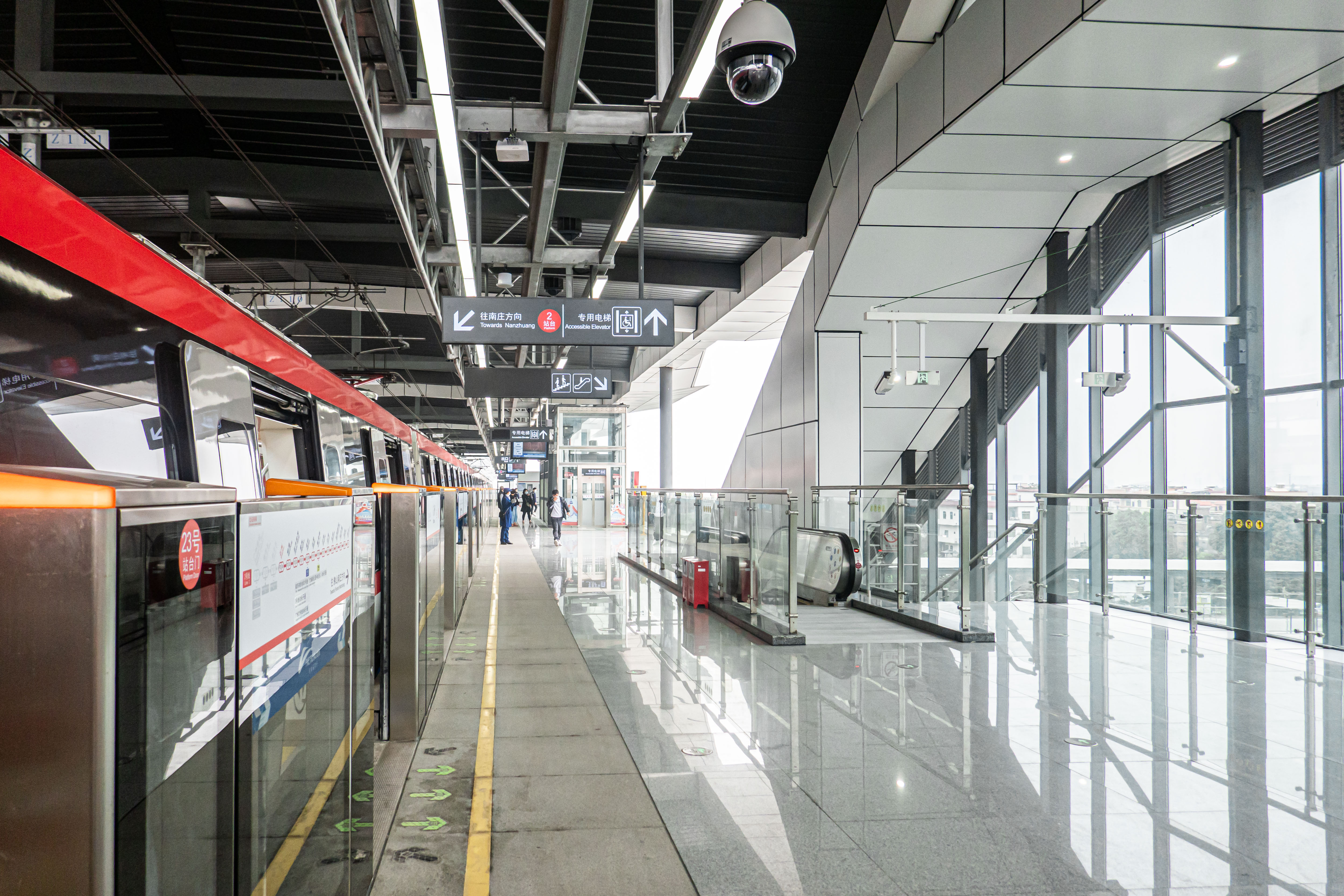
Platform 2 (towards Nanzhuang)
