= Xianchong station =

Foshan Metro Line 2 station

Xianchong 仙涌
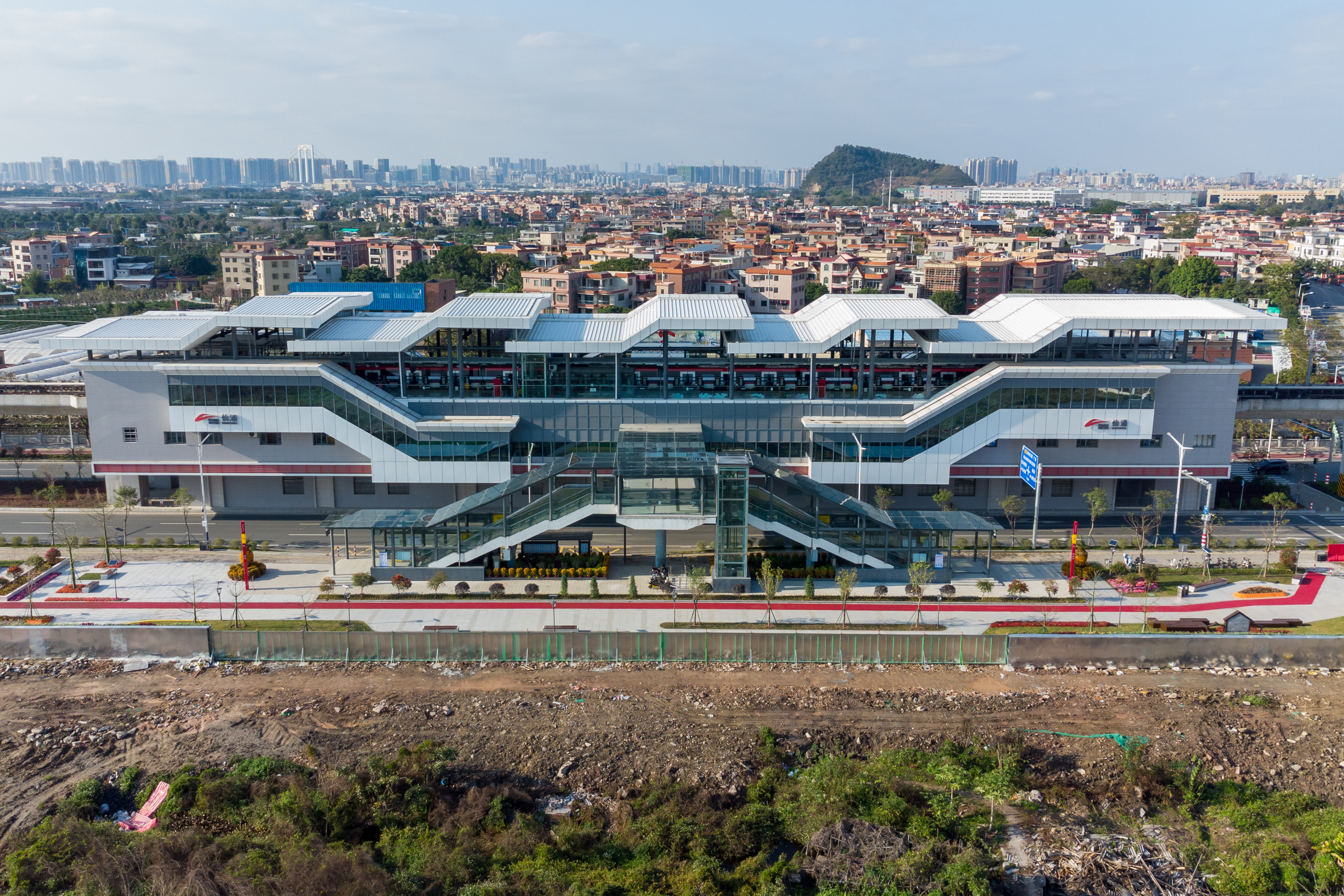
- Exterior

Chinese name
- Chinese: 仙涌站
Transcriptions
Standard Mandarin
- Hanyu Pinyin: Xiānchōng Zhàn
Yue: Cantonese
- Yale Romanization: Sīnchūng Jaahm
- Jyutping: Sin^{1}cung^{1} Zaam^{6}

General information
- Location: Southwest side of the intersection of Wendeng Road (文登路) and Market Road 1st Lane (市场路一巷), Chencun; Shunde District, Foshan, Guangdong; China
- Coordinates: 22°59′8.55″N 113°11′34.03″E
- Operator: Foshan Metro Operation Co., Ltd.
- Line: Line 2
- Platforms: 2 (2 side platforms)
- Tracks: 2

Construction
- Structure type: Elevated
- Accessible: Yes

Other information
- Station code: F223

History
- Opened: 28 December 2021 (4 years ago)

Services
Preceding station	Foshan Metro	Following station
Flower World towards Nanzhuang	Line 2	Shizhou towards Guangzhou South Railway Station
Location

Xianchong station (Chinese: 仙涌站; pinyin: Xiānchōng Zhàn; Cantonese Yale: Sīnchūng Jaahm) is an elevated station on Line 2 of Foshan Metro, located in Foshan's Shunde District. It opened on 28 December 2021.

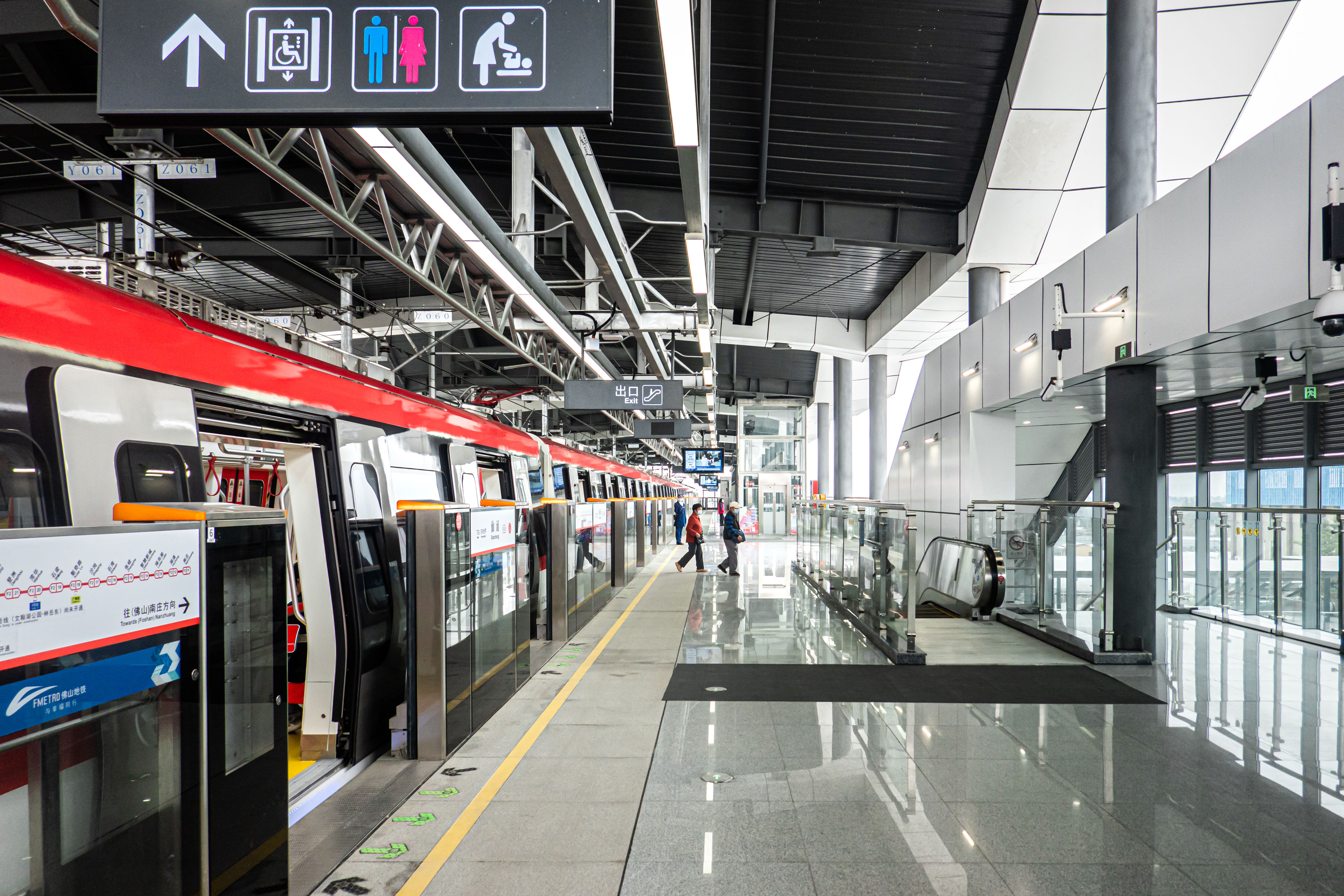
Platform 2 (towards Nanzhuang)

== Station layout ==
The station has two side platforms above Wendeng Road.

F3; Platforms	Side platform, doors will open on the right
F3; Platforms	Platform 2	2 towards Nanzhuang (Flower World)
F3; Platforms	Platform 1	2 towards Guangzhou South Railway Station (Shizhou)
F3; Platforms	Side platform, doors will open on the right
F2; Concourse	Lobby	Ticket Machines, Customer Service, Police Station, Security Facilities
G	-	Exits A & B

=== Entrances/exits ===
The station has 4 points of entry/exit. Exit A2 is equipped with an elevator.

- A1: Wendeng Road
- A2: Wendeng Road
- B1, B2: Wendeng Road
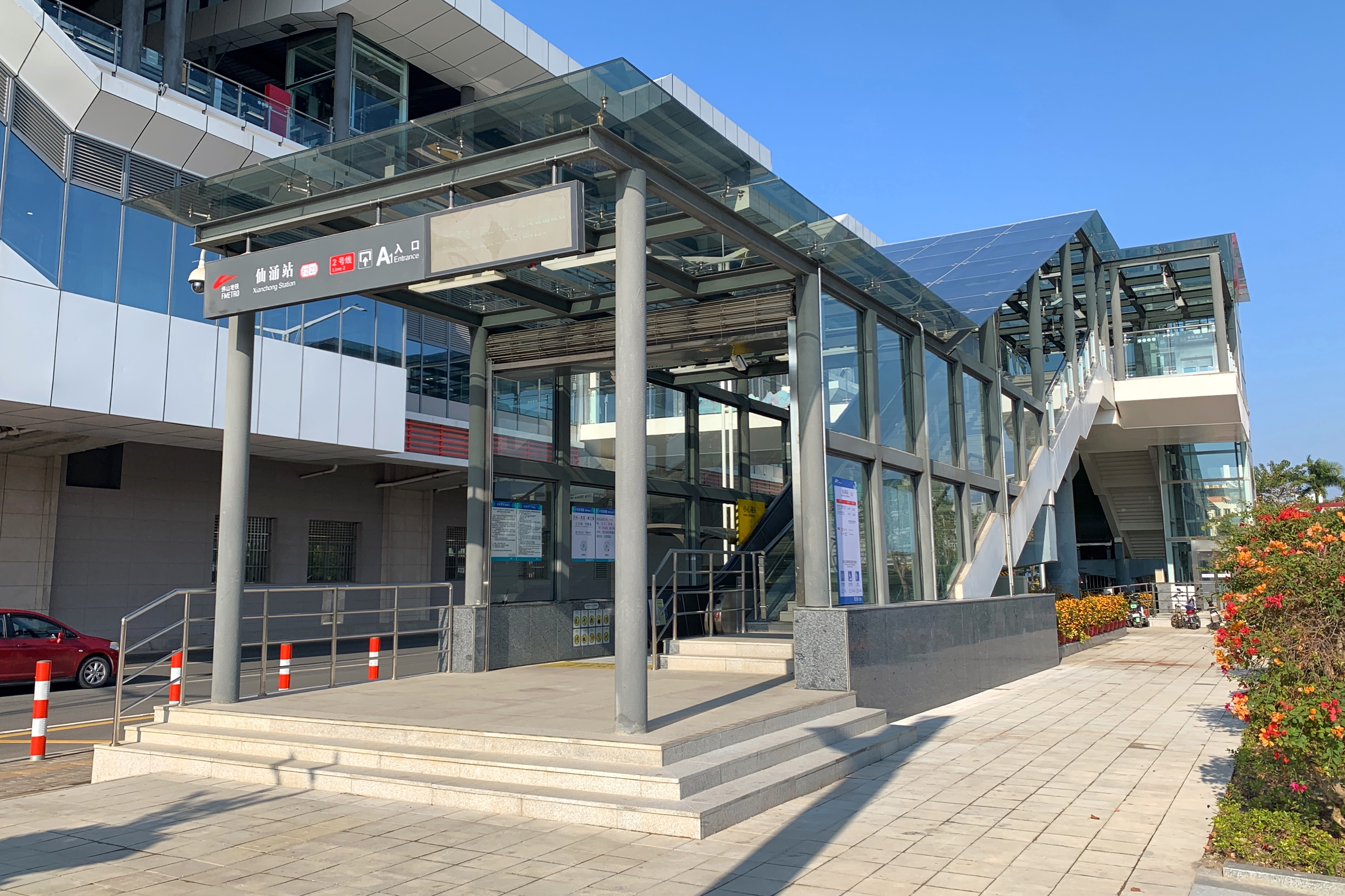
Entrance A1

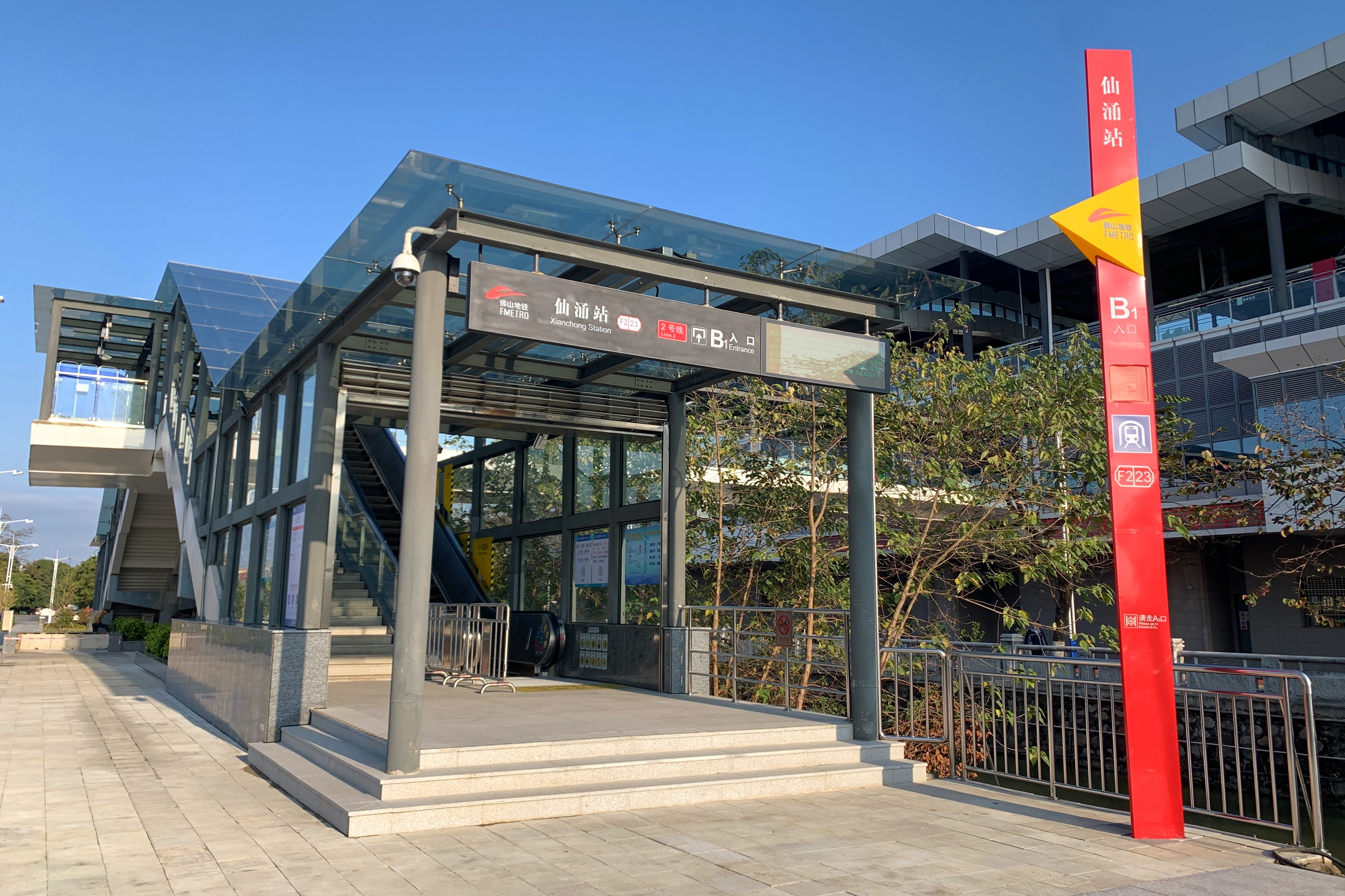
Entrance B1

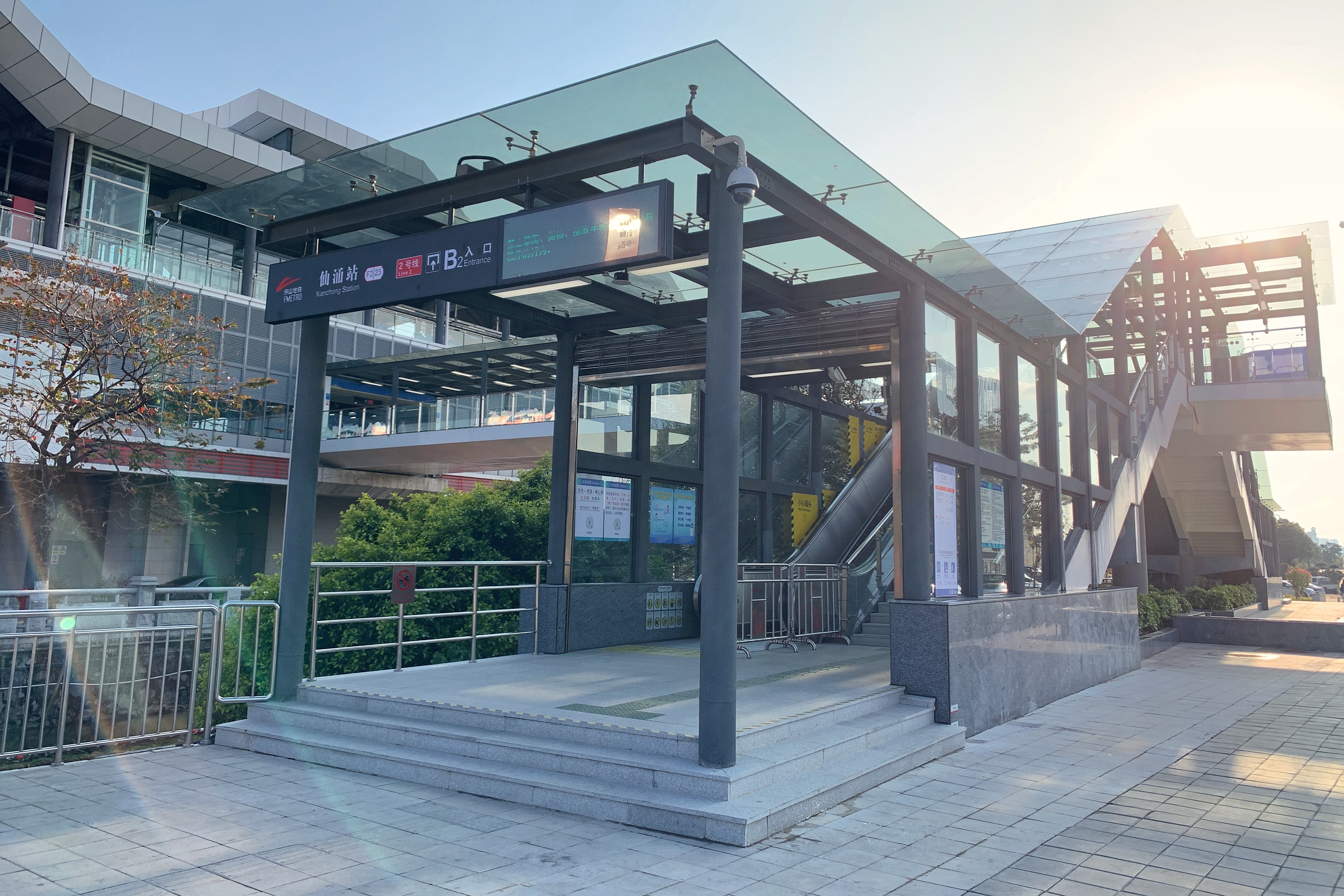
Entrance B2
