= Linyue Dong station =

Foshan Metro Line 2 and Nanhai Tram Line 1 station

Linyue Dong / Linyuedong (Note: The station name for Line 2 is spelt 'Linyue Dong' with a space in between, whilst the station name for Nanhai Tram Line 1 is spelt 'Linyuedong', which does not have a space in between) 林岳东
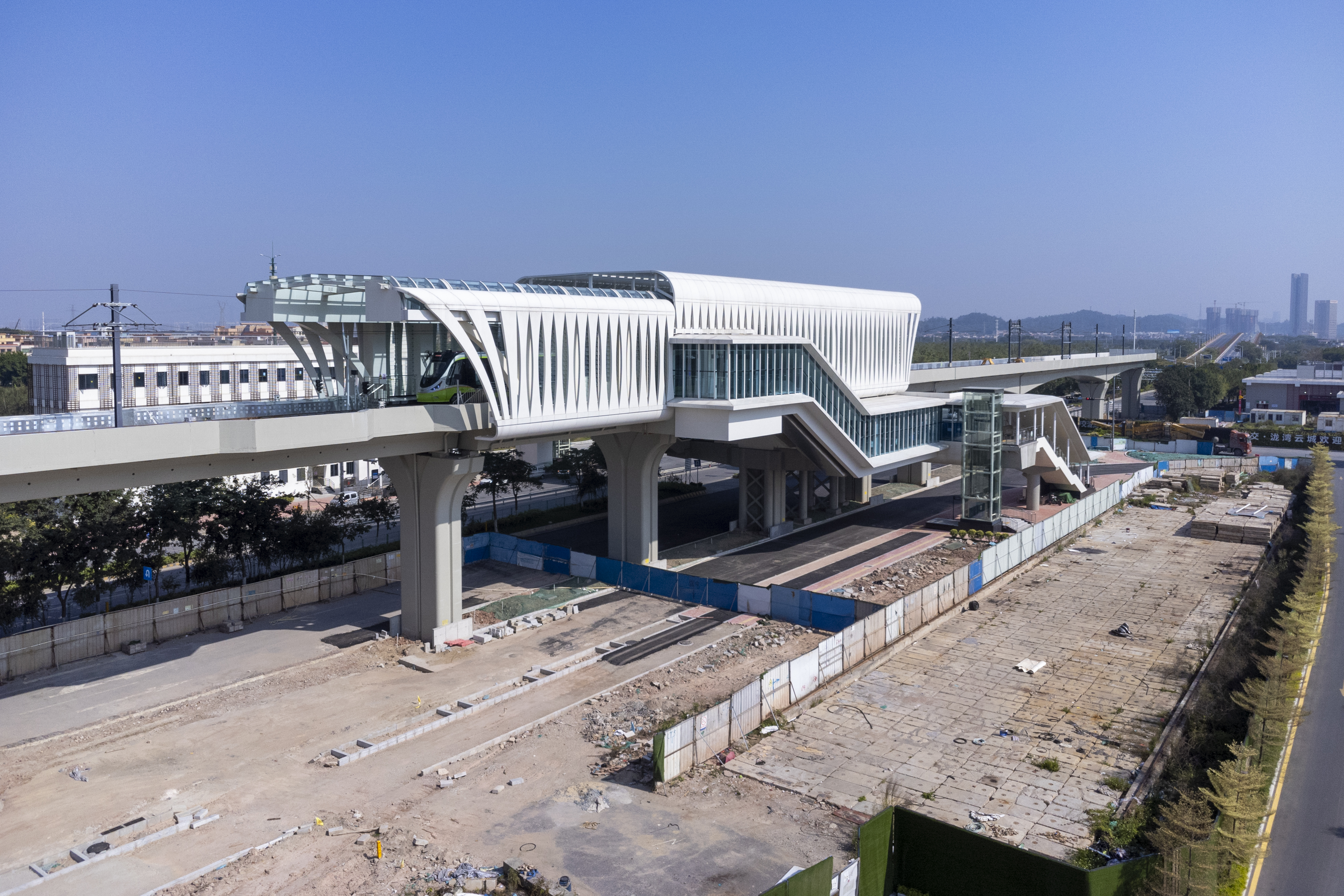
- Nanhai Tram Line 1 station exterior

Chinese name
- Simplified Chinese: 林岳东站
- Traditional Chinese: 林岳東站
Transcriptions
Standard Mandarin
- Hanyu Pinyin: Línyuè Dōng Zhàn
Yue: Cantonese
- Yale Romanization: Làhmgohk Dōng Jaahm
- Jyutping: Lam^{4}ngok^{6} Dung^{1} Zaam^{6}

General information
- Location: Intersection of Linyue Boulevard (林岳大道) and Gangkou South Road (港口南路), Guicheng Subdistrict; Nanhai District, Foshan, Guangdong; China
- Coordinates: 22°59′47.84″N 113°14′40.53″E
- Operator: Foshan Metro Operation Co., Ltd.
- Lines: Line 2 Nanhai Tram Line 1 Line 11 (future)
- Platforms: 4 (1 island platform (Line 2) and 2 side platforms (Nanhai Tram Line 1))
- Tracks: 4

Construction
- Structure type: Underground (Line 2) and Elevated (Nanhai Tram Line 1)
- Platform levels: 2
- Accessible: Yes

Other information
- Station code: F226 TNH115

History
- Opened: Line 2: 28 December 2021 (4 years ago); Nanhai Tram Line 1: 29 November 2022 (3 years ago)

Services
Preceding station	Foshan Metro	Following station
Linyue Xi towards Nanzhuang	Line 2	Guangzhou South Railway Station Terminus
Linyue Xi towards Leigang	Nanhai Tram Line 1	Terminus
Location

Linyue Dong / Linyuedong station (simplified Chinese: 林岳东站; traditional Chinese: 林岳東站; pinyin: Línyuè Dōng Zhàn; Cantonese Yale: Làhmgohk Dōng Jaahm) is an underground station on Line 2 of Foshan Metro and an elevated station on Nanhai Tram Line 1, located in Foshan's Nanhai District. Line 2 opened on 28 December 2021, whilst Nanhai Tram Line 1 opened on 29 November 2022. It is the southeastern terminus of Nanhai Tram Line 1.

At present, the Line 2 and Nanhai Tram Line 1 stations are two independent stations, about 500m apart. In addition, the adjacent Linyue Xi Station has a transfer between Line 2 and Nanhai Tram Line 1, so the current operator does not regard Linyue Dong Station as a transfer station. Linyue Dong Station of the two lines on the online network map is marked as two different stations, and the English station names of the two stations are also spelled differently.

== Station layout (Line 2) ==
The Line 2 station has an underground island platform on the south side of Linyue Avenue. West of the station are connecting lines to Linyue Depot, and the station also has reserved partial structures and part of the platform for Line 11.

G Concourse	Lobby ( 2 )	Ticket Machines, Customer Service, Shops, Police Station, Security Facilities, Exits A & B
L1; Platforms	Platform 2	2 towards Nanzhuang (Linyue Xi)
L1; Platforms	Island platform, doors will open on the left
L1; Platforms	Platform 1	2 towards Guangzhou South Railway Station (terminus)
L2	-	Line 11 reserved level
L3; Reserved Platforms		11 reserved track area
L3; Reserved Platforms	Reserved Island platform
L3; Reserved Platforms		11 reserved track area

=== Entrances/exits ===
There are 2 points of entry/exit for Line 2. Both exits are equipped with ramps.

- A: Linyue Avenue
- B: Linyue Avenue
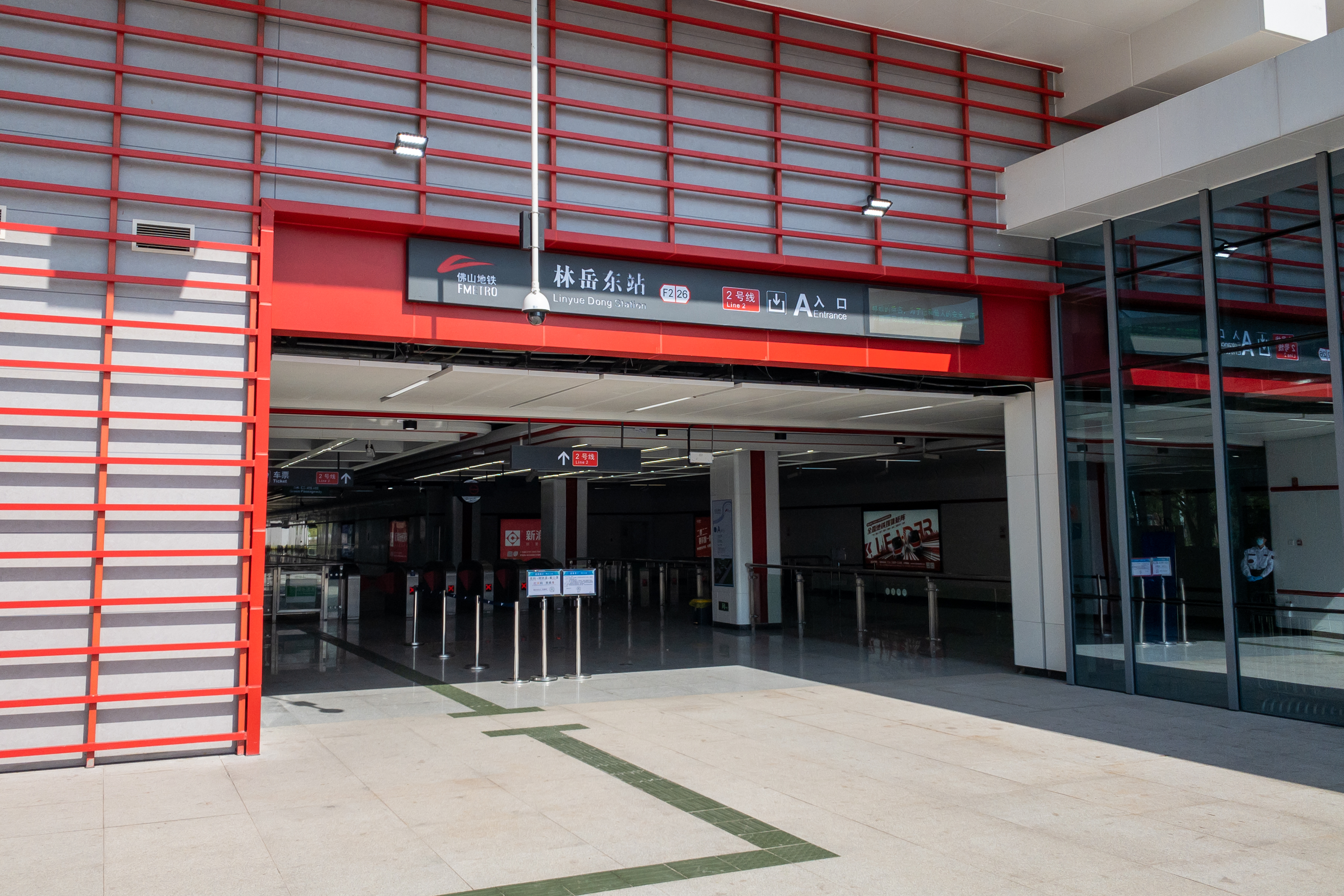
Entrance A

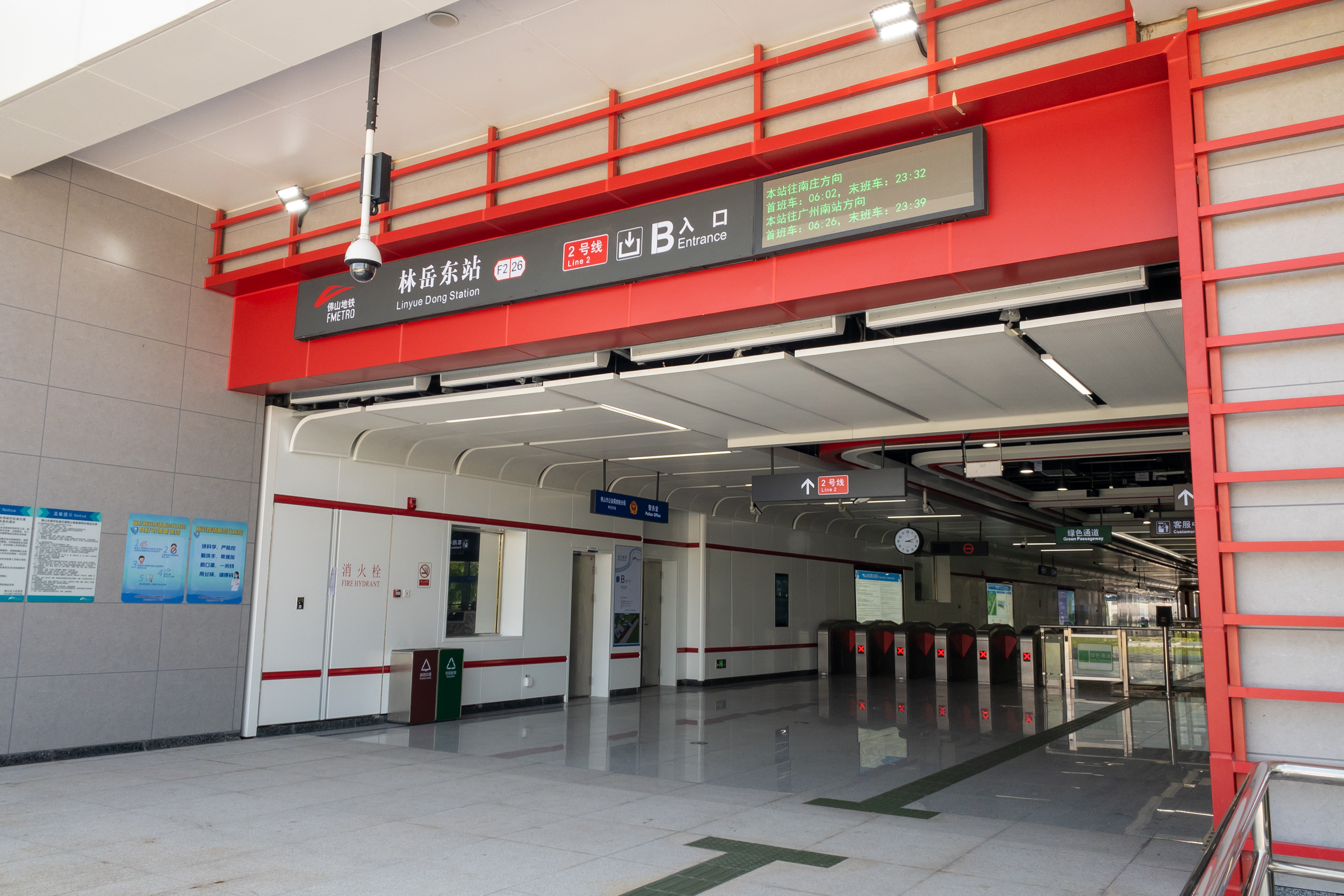
Entrance B

== Station layout (Nanhai Tram Line 1) ==
The Nanhai Tram Line 1 station has 2 elevated side platforms on Linyue Avenue, about 500m west of the Line 2 station.

F3; Platforms	Side platform, doors will open on the left
F3; Platforms	Platform 1	TNH1 towards Leigang (Linyue Xi)
F3; Platforms	Platform 2	TNH1 towards Leigang (Linyue Xi)
F3; Platforms	Side platform, doors will open on the right
F2; Concourse	Lobby ( TNH1 )	Ticket Machines, Customer Service, Police Station, Security Facilities
G	-	Exits A & B

=== Entrances/exits ===
There are 2 points of entry/exit for Nanhai Tram Line 1. Both exits are equipped with elevators.

- A: Linyue Avenue
- B: Linyue Avenue
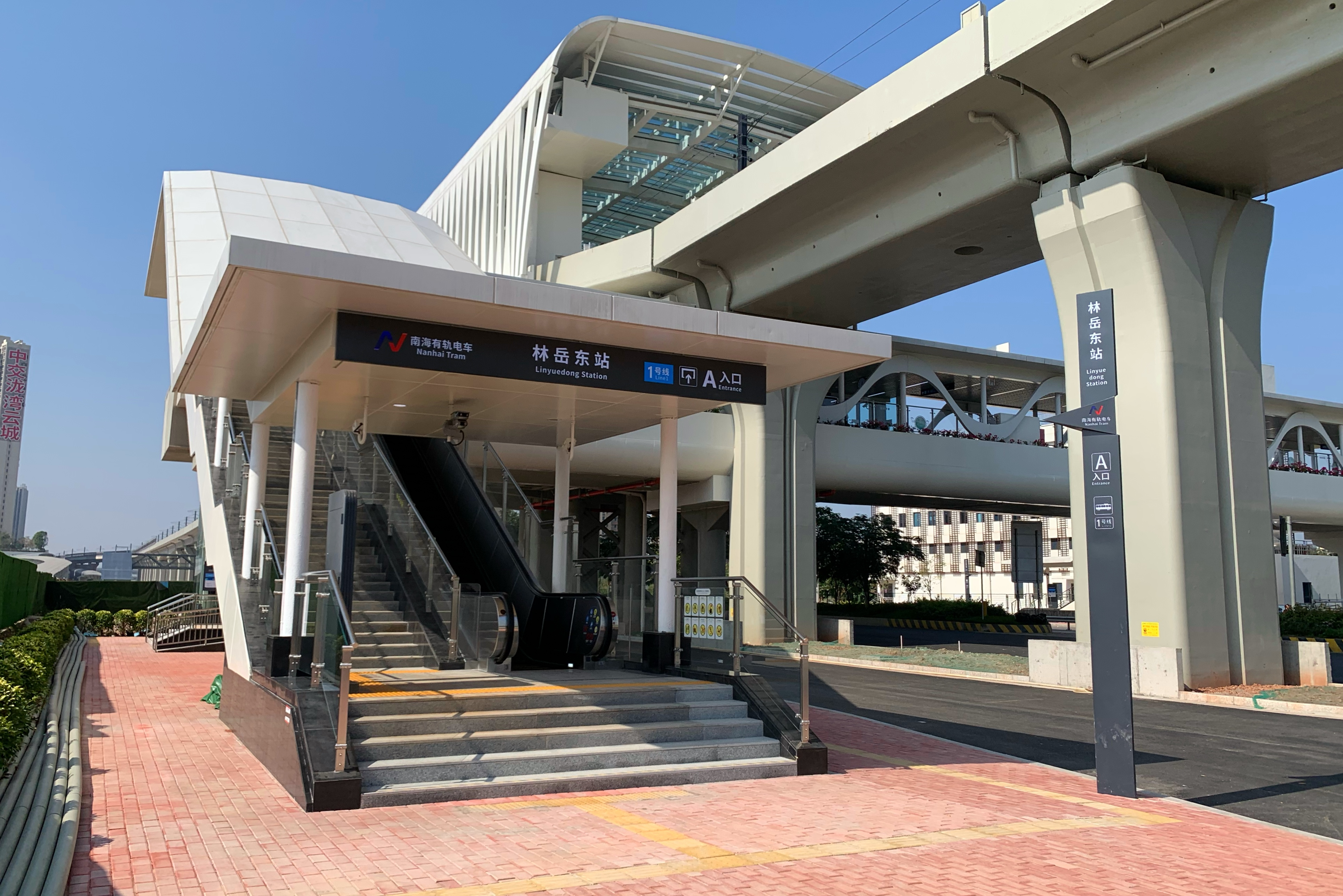
Entrance A

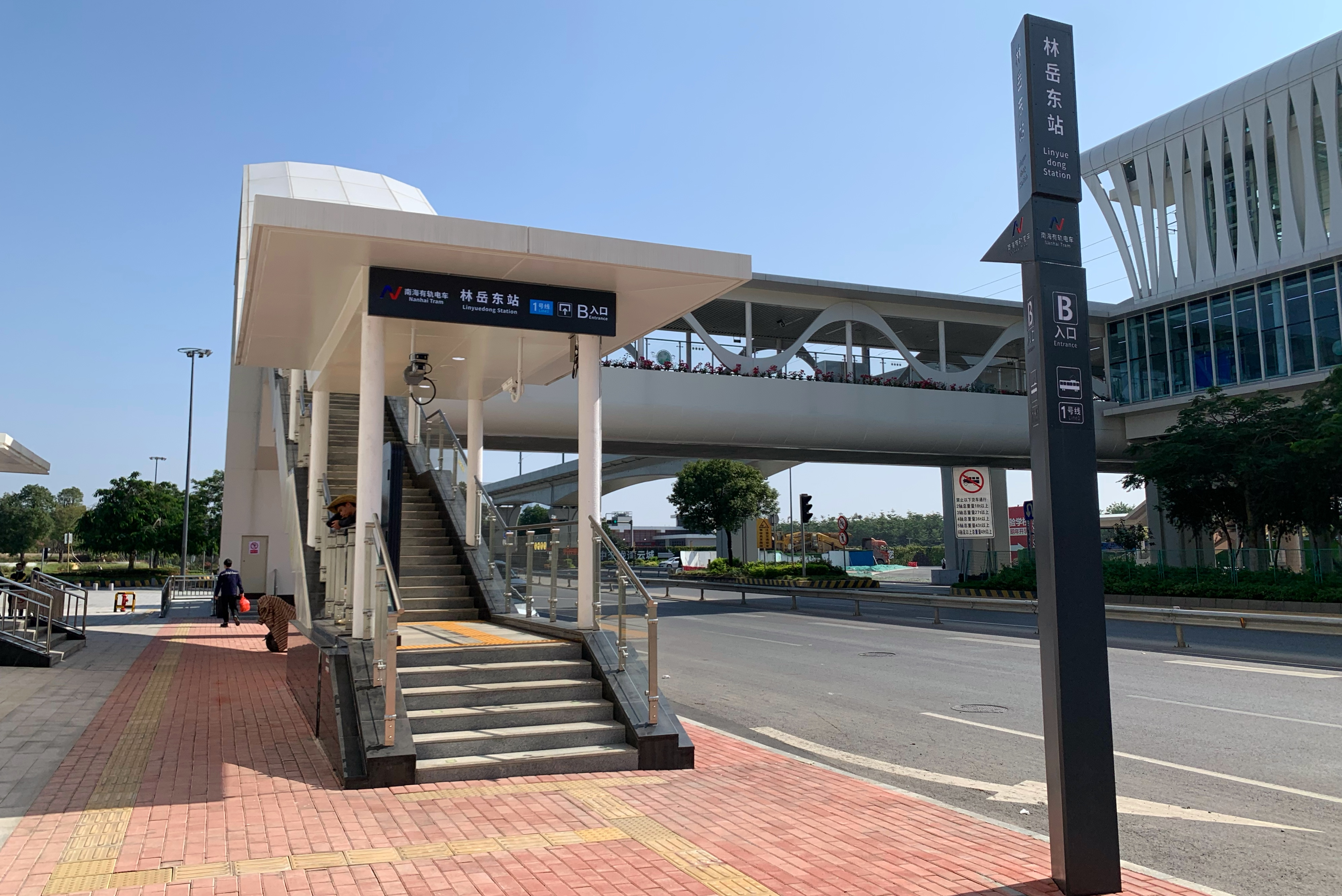
Entrance B

== Gallery ==
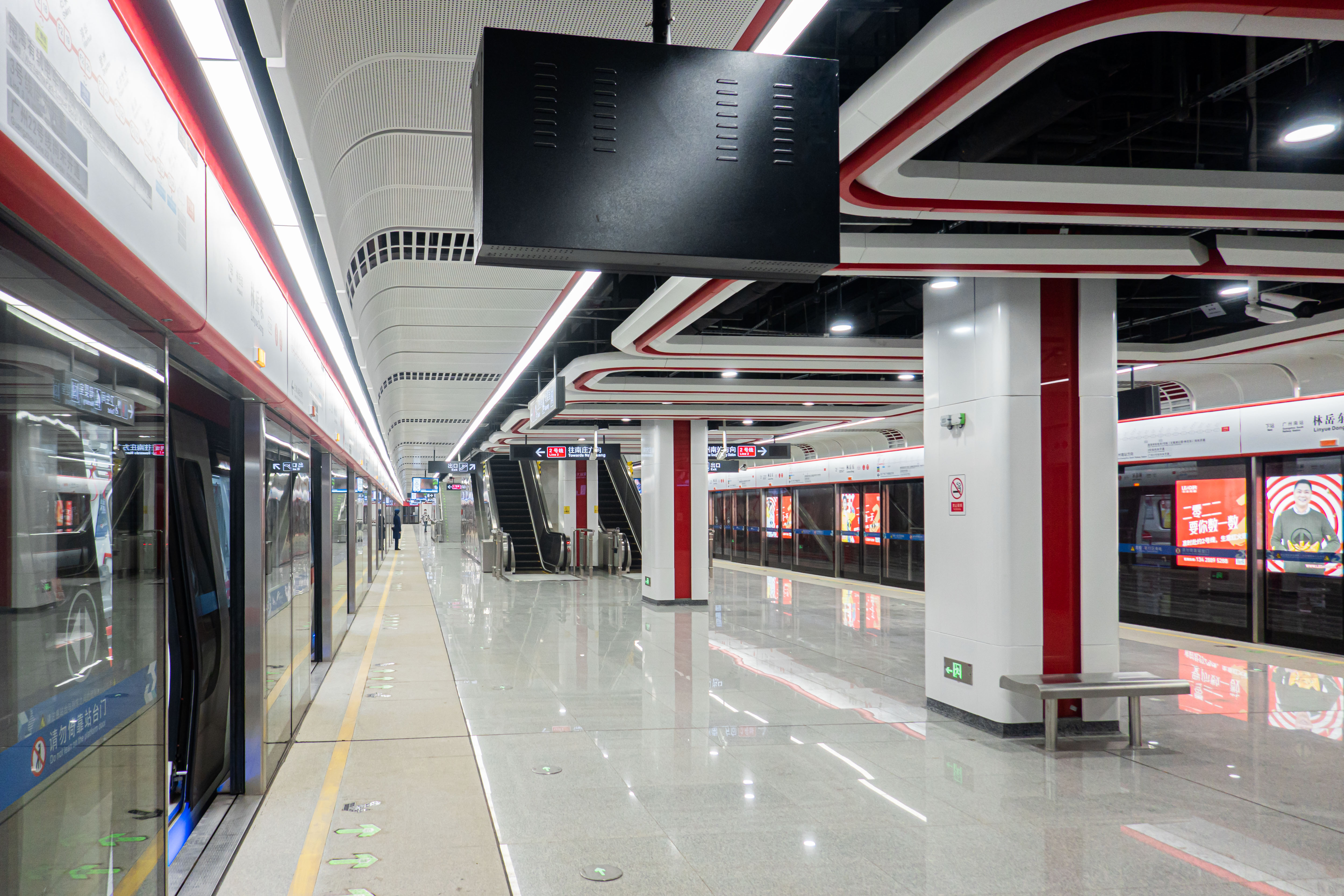
Line 2 platform

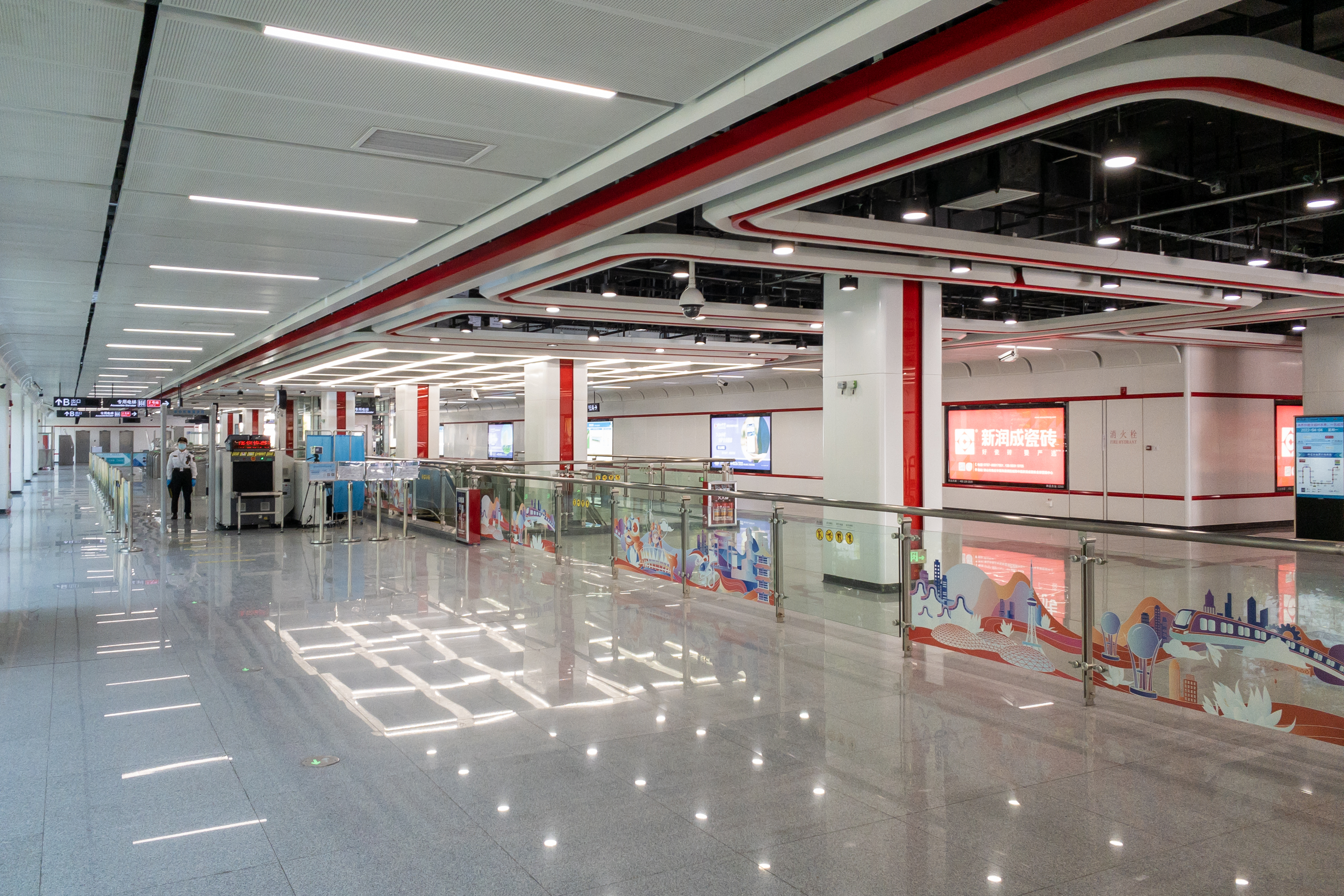
Line 2 concourse

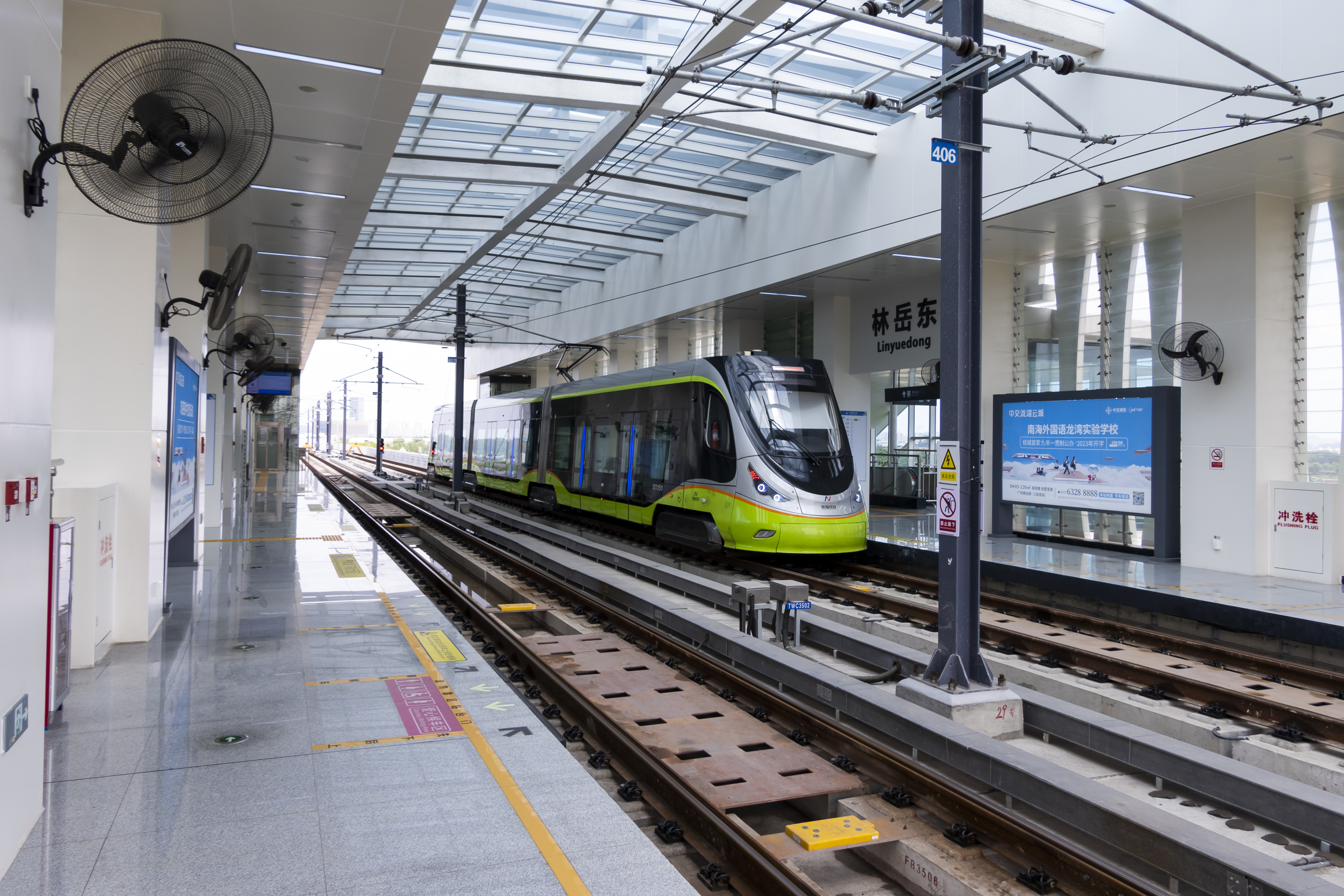
Nanhai Tram Line 1 platforms

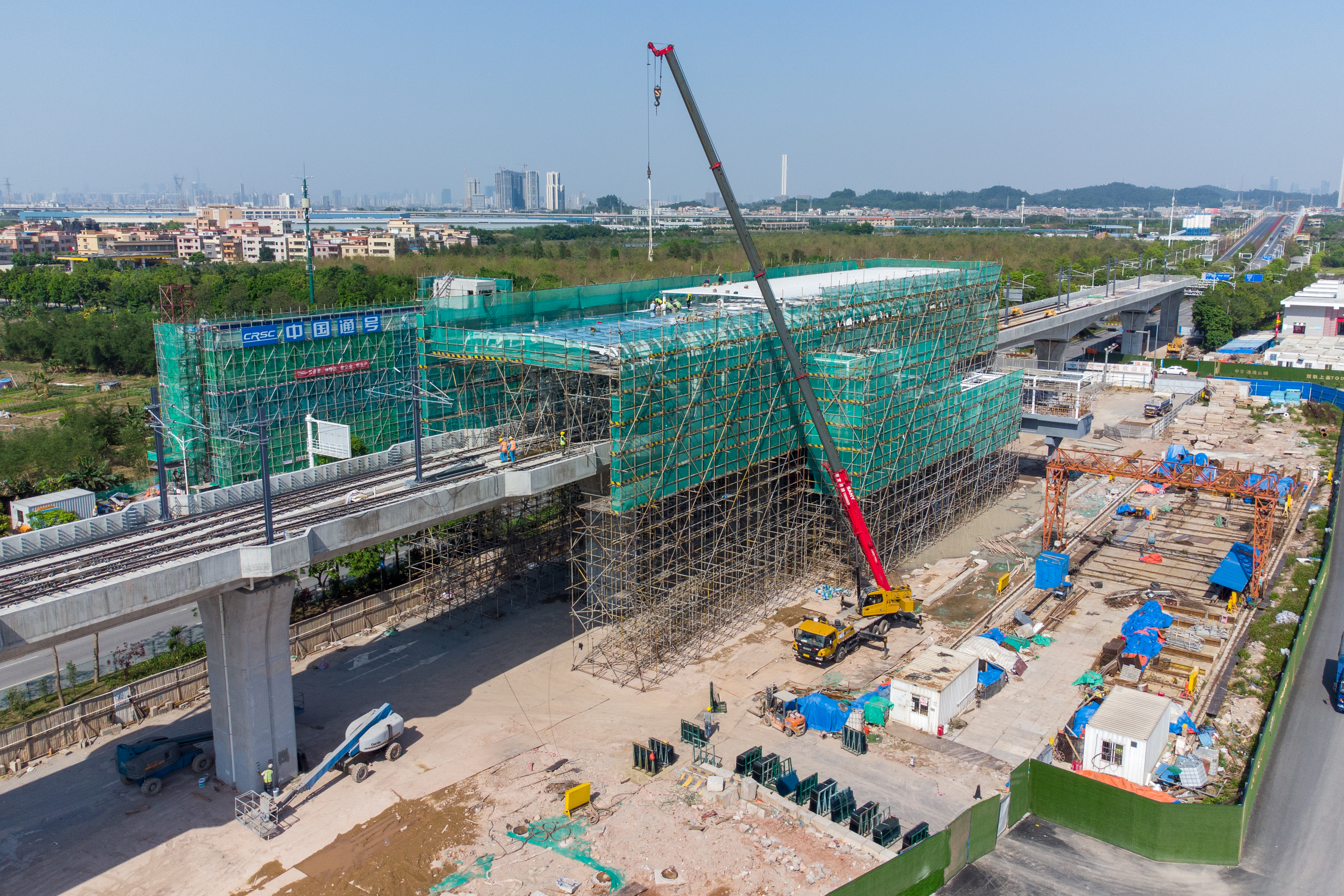
Nanhai Tram Line 1 station under construction (April 2022)

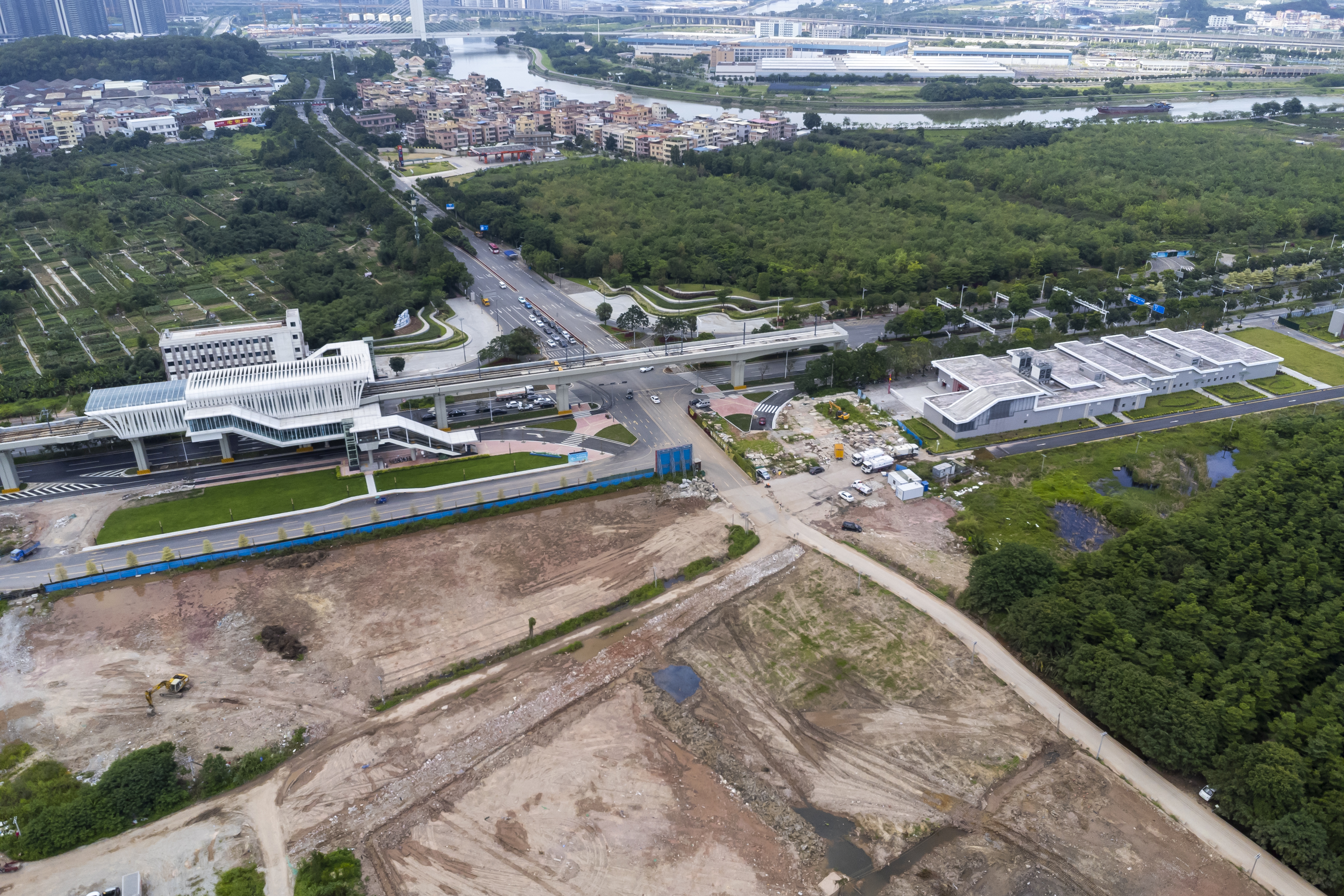
Station exterior of Line 2 and Nanhai Tram Line 1. Line 11 construction area will be in the middle-lower part of the image

== Future development ==
The station is planned to have an interchange with Line 11. There are also plans to extend Nanhai Tram Line 1 from this station to Guangzhou South Railway Station for 3 km, and preliminary studies are currently underway.
