= Flower World station =

Foshan Metro Line 2 station

Flower World 花卉世界
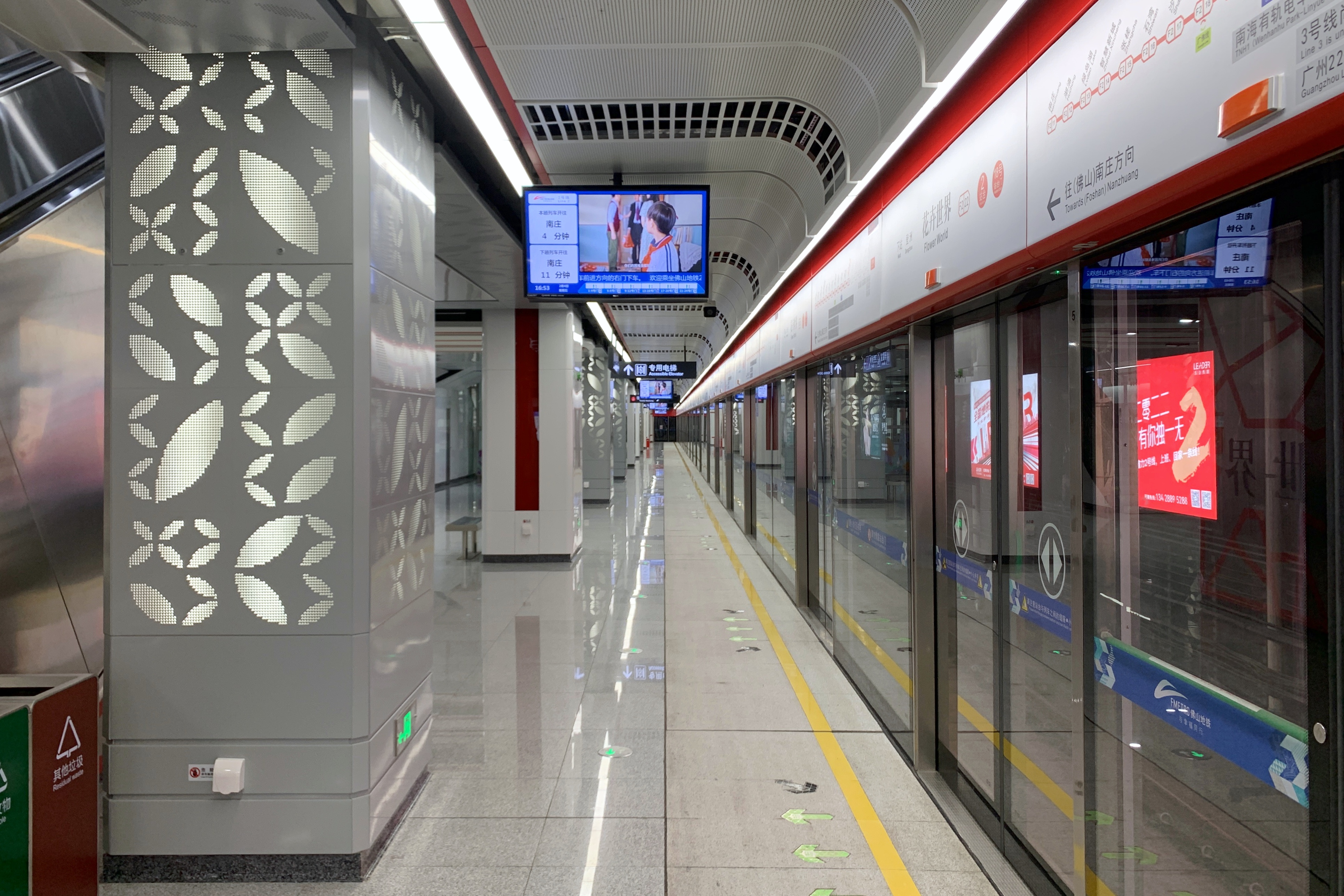
- Platform

Chinese name
- Chinese: 花卉世界站
Transcriptions
Standard Mandarin
- Hanyu Pinyin: Huāhuì Shìjiè Zhàn
Yue: Cantonese
- Yale Romanization: Fāwaíh Sáigaíh Jaahm
- Jyutping: Faa^{1}wai^{2} Sai^{3}gaai^{3} Zaam^{6}

General information
- Location: Intersection of Fochen Road (佛陈路) and Fanghua Avenue (芳华大道), Chencun; Shunde District, Foshan, Guangdong; China
- Coordinates: 22°58′34″N 113°09′21″E
- Operator: Foshan Metro Operation Co., Ltd.
- Line: Line 2
- Platforms: 2 (1 island platform)
- Tracks: 2

Construction
- Structure type: Underground
- Accessible: Yes

Other information
- Station code: F222

History
- Opened: 28 December 2021 (4 years ago)

Services
Preceding station	Foshan Metro	Following station
Dengzhou towards Nanzhuang	Line 2	Xianchong towards Guangzhou South Railway Station
Location

Flower World station (Chinese: 花卉世界站; pinyin: Huāhuì Shìjiè Zhàn; Cantonese Yale: Fāwaíh Sáigaíh Jaahm) is a station on Line 2 of Foshan Metro, located in Foshan's Shunde District. It opened on 28 December 2021.

== Station theme ==
Flower World Station is one of the featured stations on Line 2. The station incorporates the petals and blooming shapes of the white orchid-tree, the flower of Foshan, into the pillars and ceilings, allowing passengers to experience the fragrance of the Chencun Flower World in advance.

== Station layout ==
The station has an island platform under Fochen Road. It also has pre-built reserved structures for a future interchange with Line 6.

G	-	Exits A-C
L1; Concourse	Lobby	Ticket Machines, Customer Service, Shops, Police Station, Security Facilities
L2; Platforms	Platform 2	2 towards Nanzhuang (Dengzhou)
L2; Platforms	Island platform, doors will open on the left
L2; Platforms	Platform 1	2 towards Guangzhou South Railway Station (Xianchong)
L3; Reserved Platforms		6 reserved track area
L3; Reserved Platforms	Reserved Island platform
L3; Reserved Platforms		6 reserved track area

=== Entrances/exits ===
The station has 3 points of entry/exit. Exit B is equipped with an elevator.

- A: Fochen Road
- B: Fochen Road
- C: Fochen Road
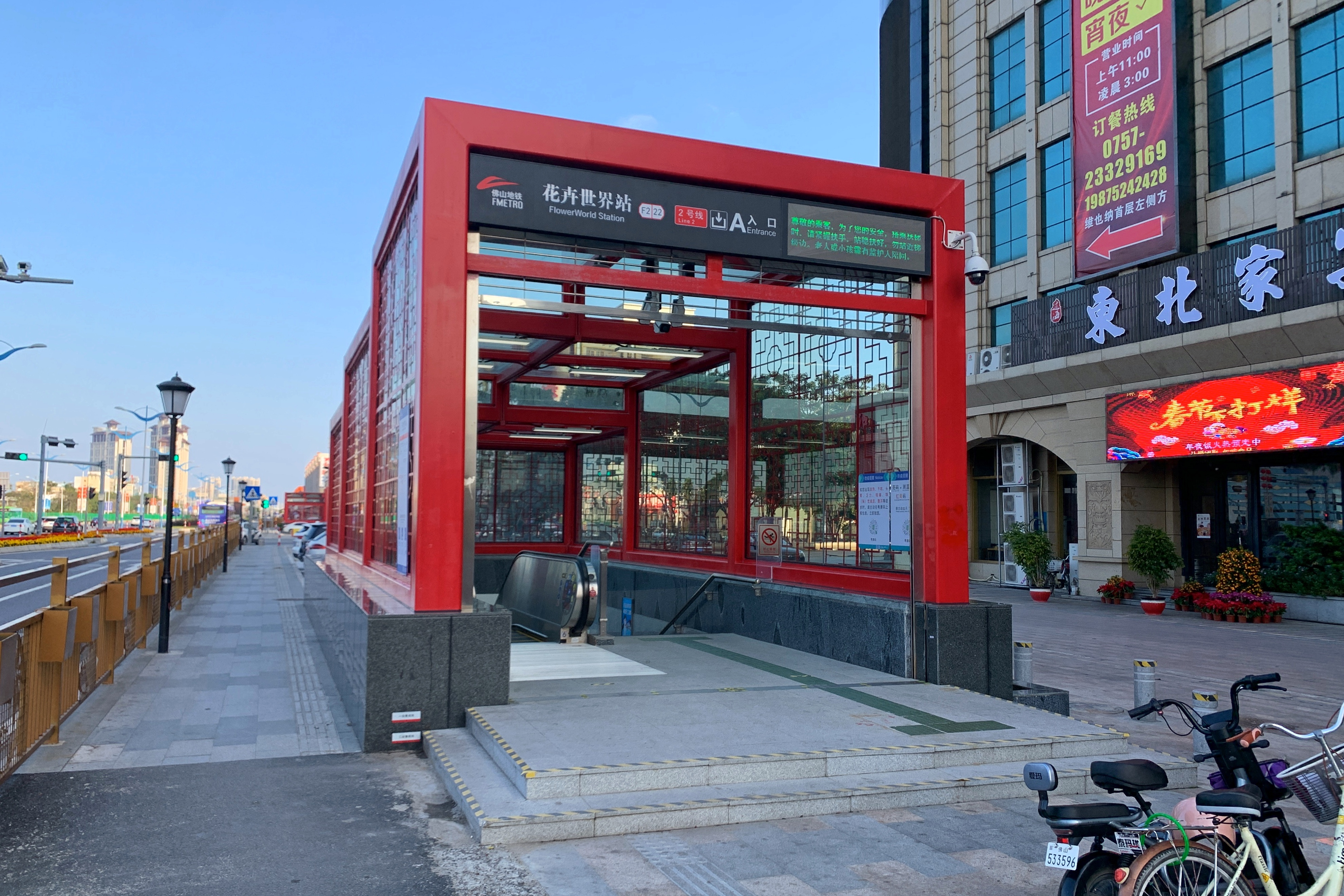
Entrance A

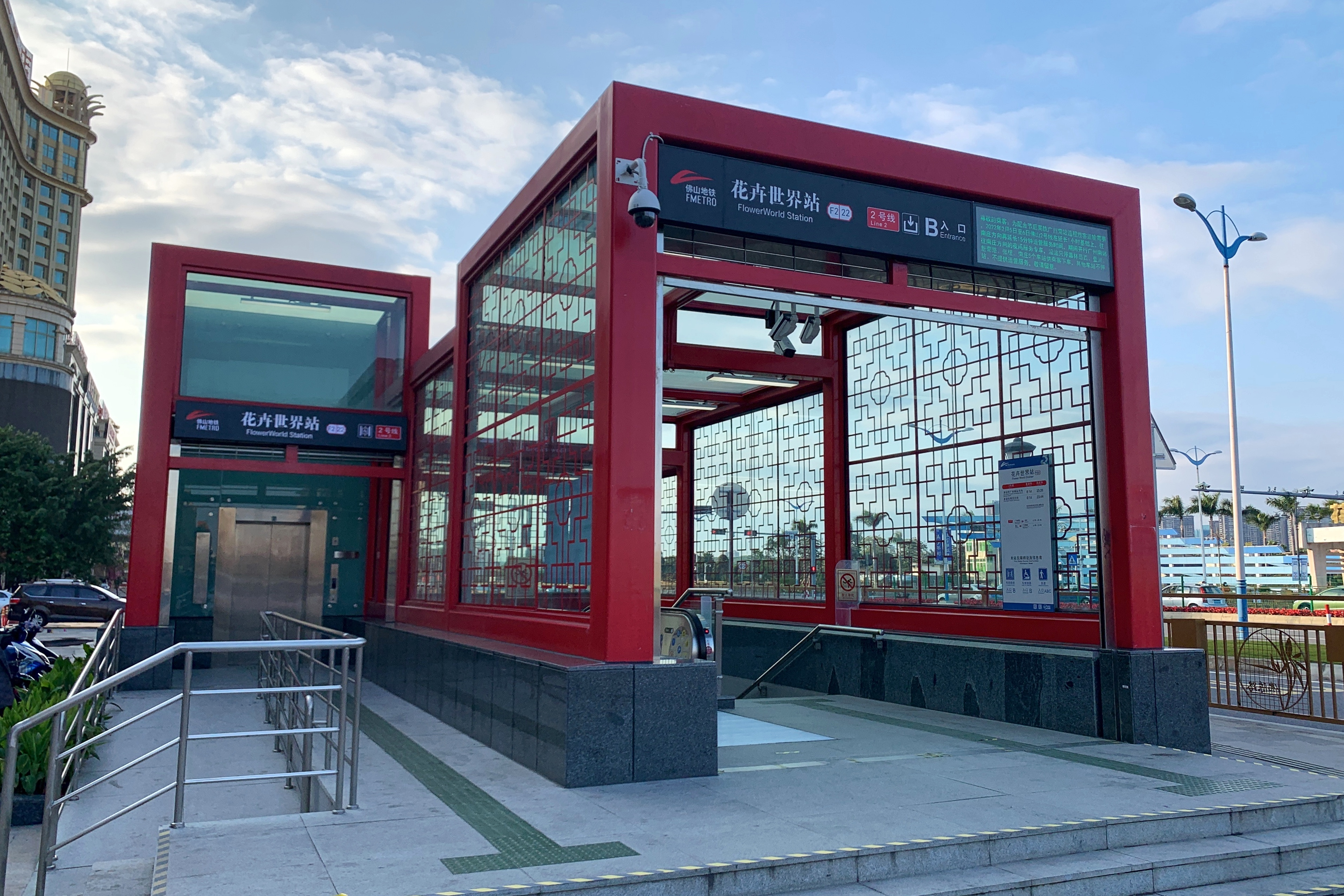
Entrance B

== Gallery ==
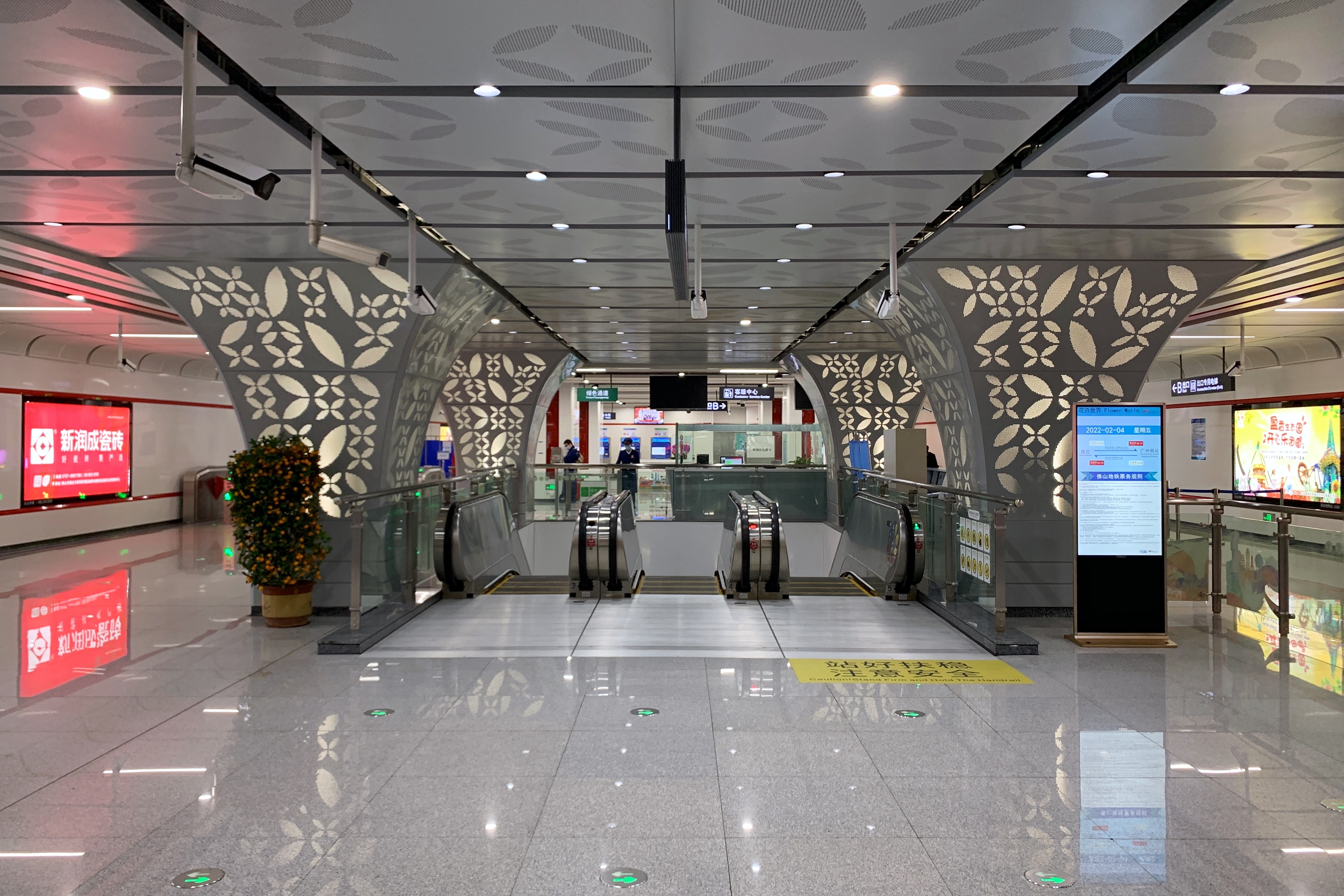
Concourse

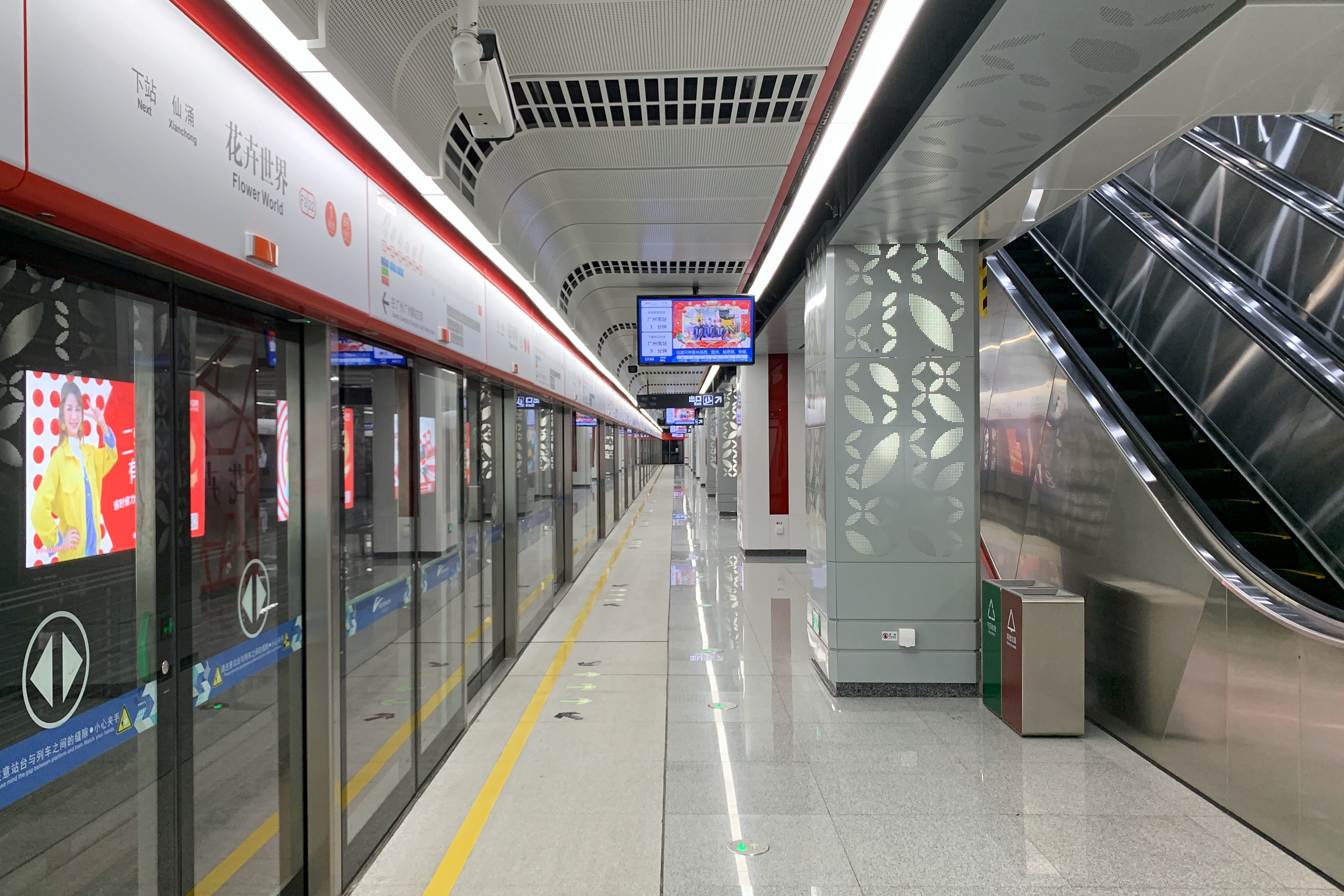
Platform 1 (towards Guangzhou South Railway Station)
