= Linyue Xi station =

Foshan Metro Line 2 and Nanhai Tram Line 1 station

Linyue Xi 林岳西
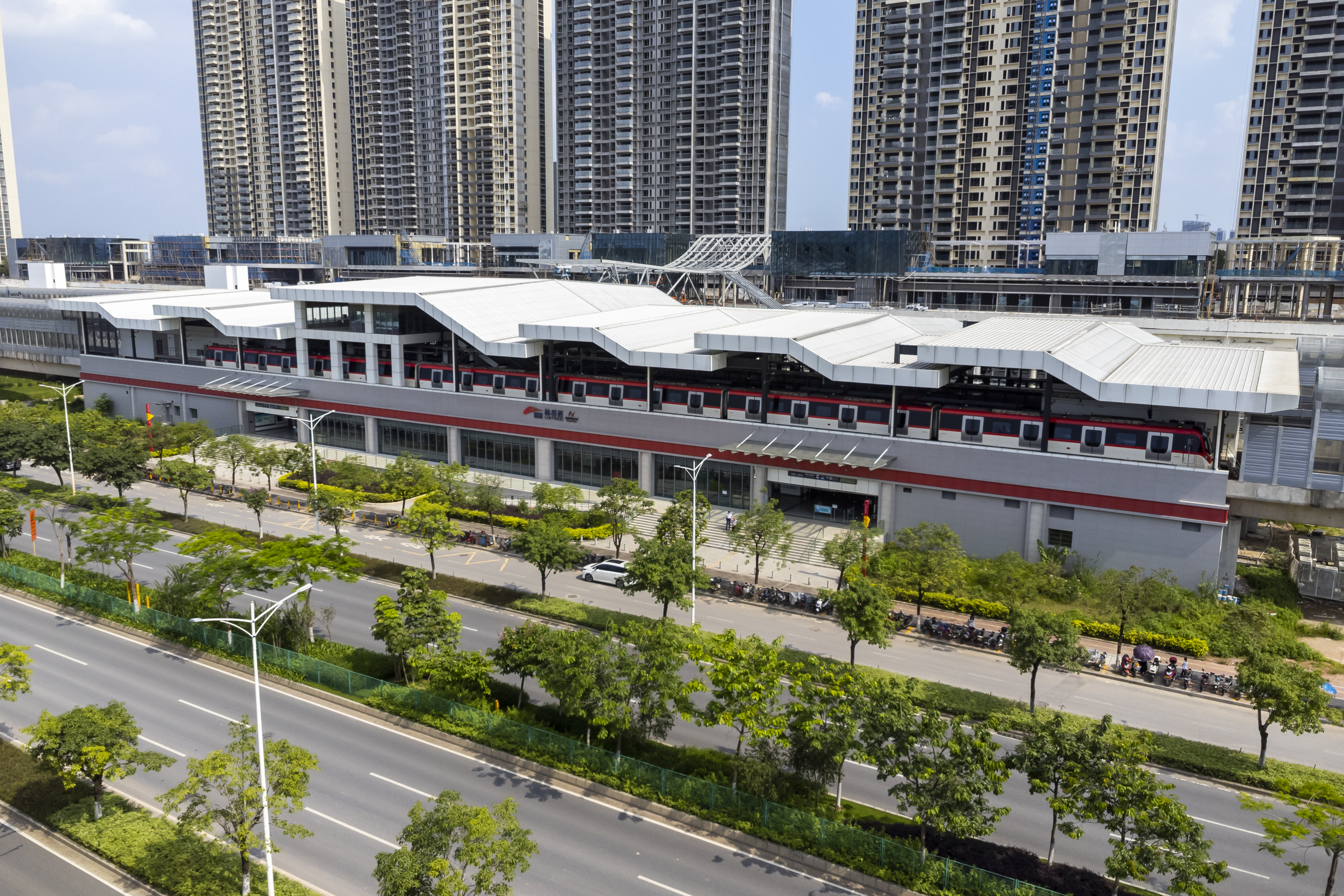
- Exterior

Chinese name
- Chinese: 林岳西站
Transcriptions
Standard Mandarin
- Hanyu Pinyin: Línyuè Xī Zhàn
Yue: Cantonese
- Yale Romanization: Làhmgohk Sāi Jaahm
- Jyutping: Lam^{4}ngok^{6} Sai^{1} Zaam^{6}

General information
- Location: East side of intersection of Taishan Road (泰山路) and Linyue Avenue (林岳大道), Guicheng Subdistrict; Nanhai District, Foshan, Guangdong; China
- Coordinates: 22°59′47.56″N 113°13′54.90″E
- Operator: Foshan Metro Operation Co., Ltd.
- Lines: Line 2 Nanhai Tram Line 1
- Platforms: 4 (2 island platforms)
- Tracks: 4

Construction
- Structure type: Elevated
- Accessible: Yes

Other information
- Station code: F225 TNH114

History
- Opened: Line 2: 28 December 2021 (4 years ago); Nanhai Tram Line 1: 29 November 2022 (3 years ago)

Services
Preceding station	Foshan Metro	Following station
Shizhou towards Nanzhuang	Line 2	Linyue Dong towards Guangzhou South Railway Station
Linyuebei towards Leigang	Nanhai Tram Line 1	Linyuedong Terminus
Location

Linyue Xi station (Chinese: 林岳西站; pinyin: Línyuè Xī Zhàn; Cantonese Yale: Làhmgohk Sāi Jaahm) is an elevated station on Line 2 and Nanhai Tram Line 1 of Foshan Metro, located in Foshan's Nanhai District. Line 2 opened on 28 December 2021, whilst Nanhai Tram Line 1 opened on 29 November 2022.

On the south side of the station is the Linyue Comprehensive Maintenance Base of Line 2 (also known as the "Linyue Depot"), which has a supporting Linyue West TOD project, and was the largest TOD project in Foshan when it was completed.

== Station layout ==
The station has two island platforms above an area near Linyue Boulevard. Passengers in the direction of Nanzhuang of Line 2 can transfer to the direction of Nanhai Tram Line 1 in the same direction at this station; Passengers from the direction of Linyuedong Station of Nanhai Tram Line 1 can also transfer to Line 2 to Guangzhou South Railway Station.

F3; Upper Concourse	Lobby	Ticket Machines, Customer Service, Police Station, Security Facilities, Exits E & F, Linyue Comprehensive Maintenance Base Properties
F2; Platforms	Platform 2	2 towards Nanzhuang (Shizhou)
F2; Platforms	Island platform, doors will open on the left for 2 and right for TNH1
F2; Platforms	Platform 3	TNH1 towards Leigang (Linyuebei)
F2; Platforms	Platform 4	TNH1 towards Linyuedong (terminus)
F2; Platforms	Island platform, doors will open on the left for 2 and right for TNH1
F2; Platforms	Platform 1	2 towards Guangzhou South Railway Station (Linyue Dong)
G Lower Concourse	Lobby	Ticket Machines, Customer Service, Police Station, Security Facilities, Exits A-D

=== Entrances/exits ===
There are currently 5 points of entry/exit of the station that are officially open. Exits C and D on the north side were opened when Line 2 opened. Exits A and B on the south side were built when Nanhai Tram Line 1 opened, but because the properties above the Linyue Comprehensive Maintenance Base had not yet been completed, Exits A and B were only opened for employees and station staff until they were officially opened on 19 January 2024. Exit E located in the upper concourse on the third floor was officially opened on 31 August 2023, in tandem with the upper concourse. In addition, Exit F in the upper concourse on the third floor has not yet been opened.

- A: Longwan Cloud City, Longwan Experimental School
- B: Longwan Cloud City, Longwan Experimental School
- C: Linyue Avenue
- D: Linyue Avenue
- E: Longwan Cloud City, Longwan Experimental School
- ~~F~~: (Unopened)

All exits are equipped with ramps.

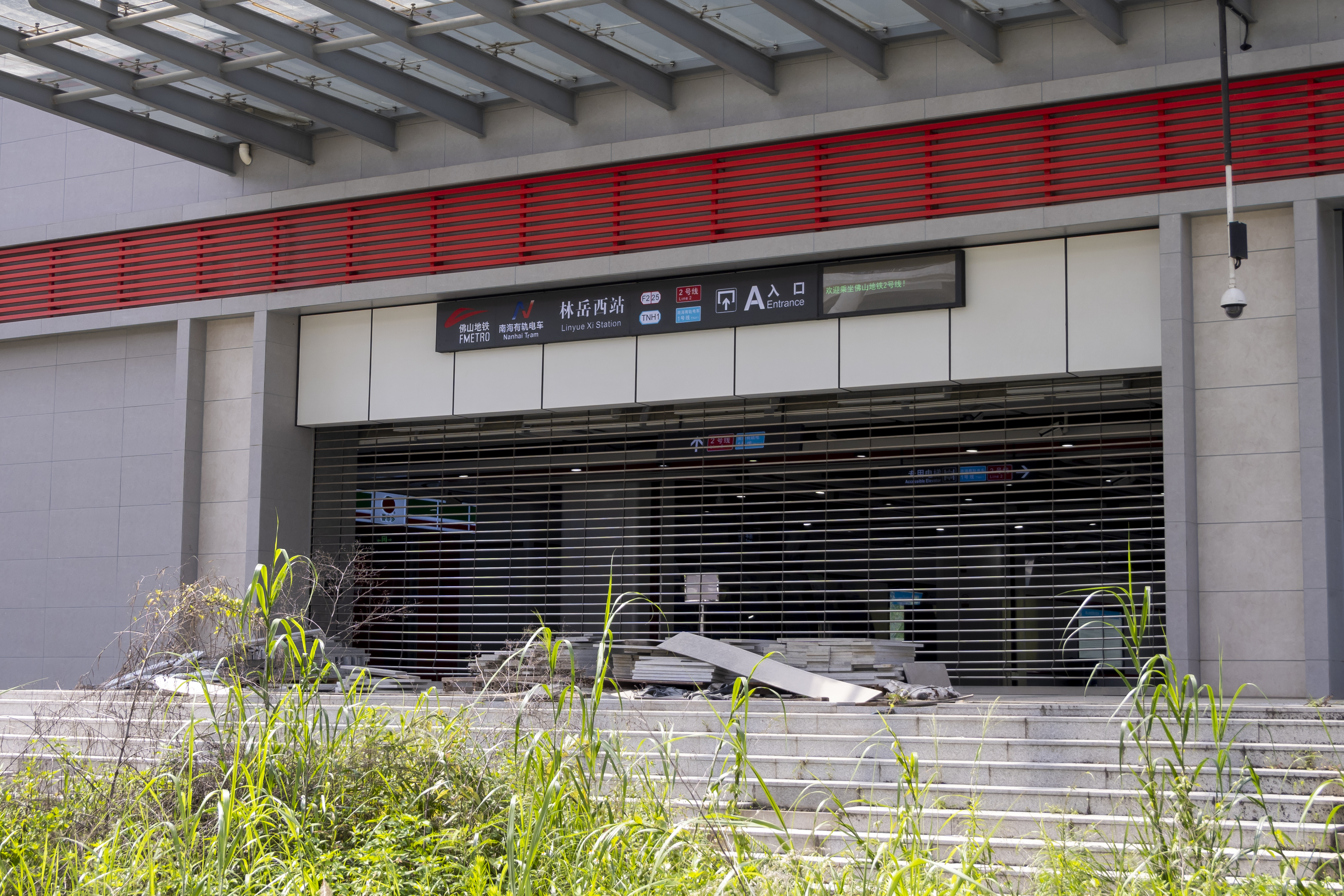
Entrance A

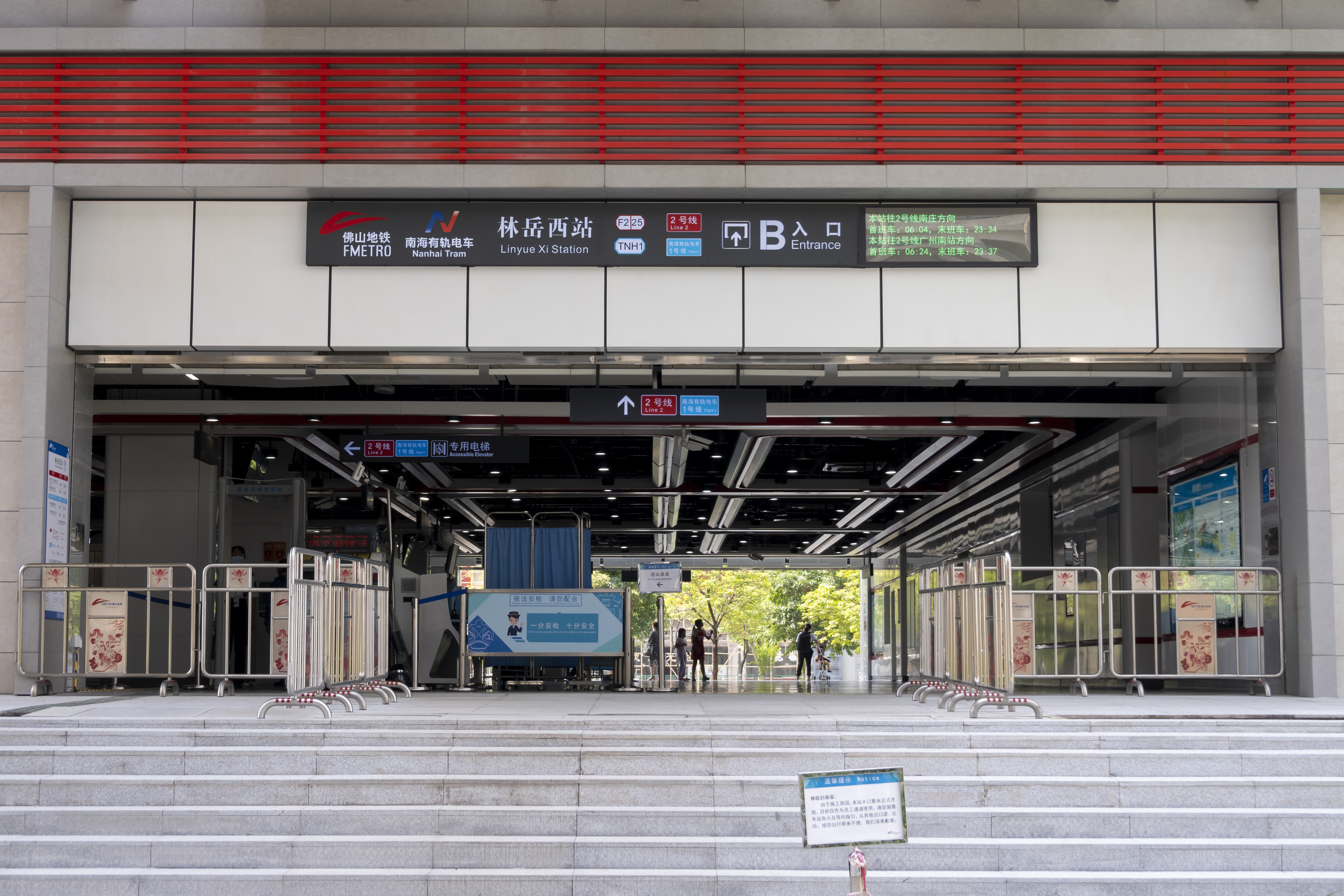
Entrance B

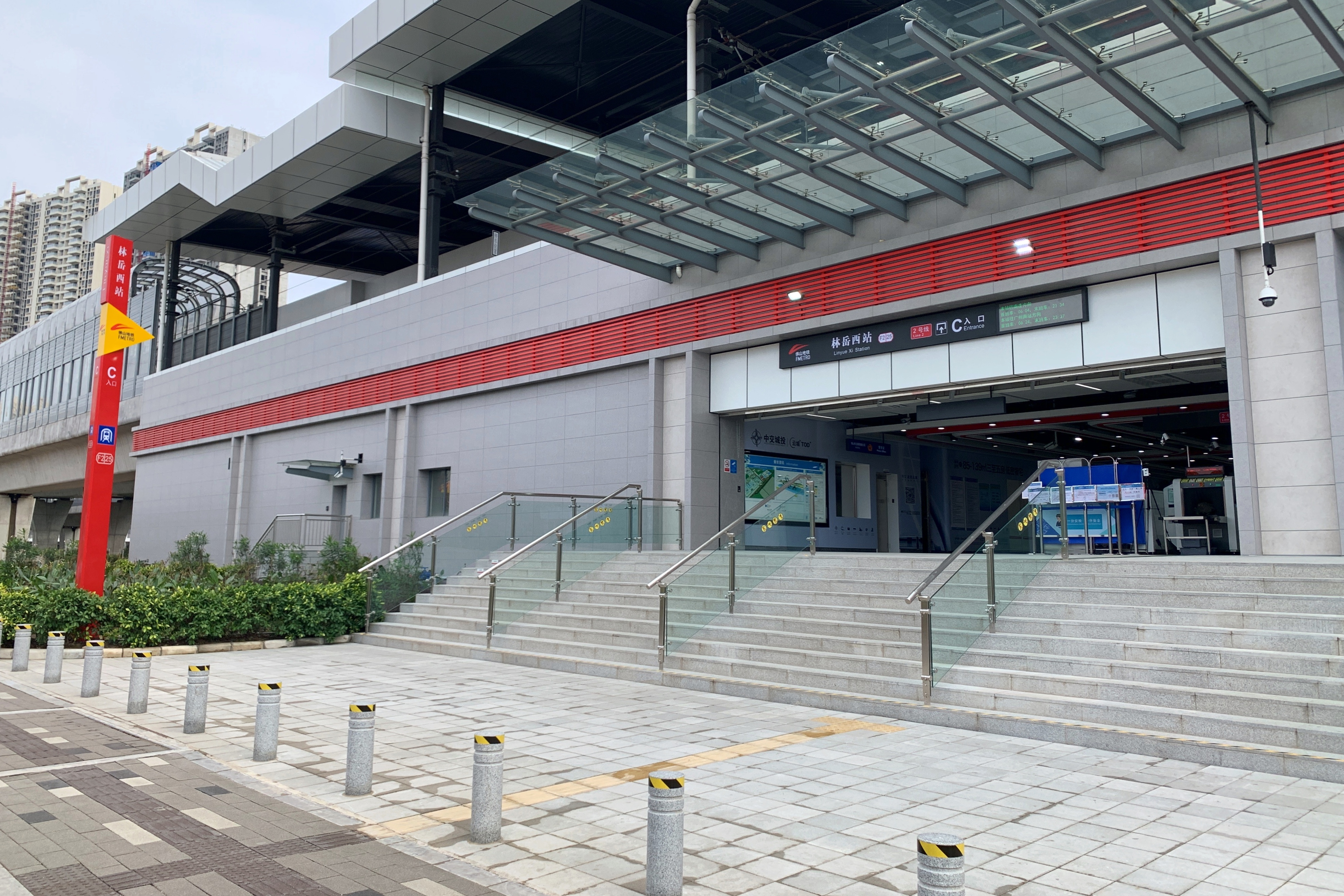
Entrance C

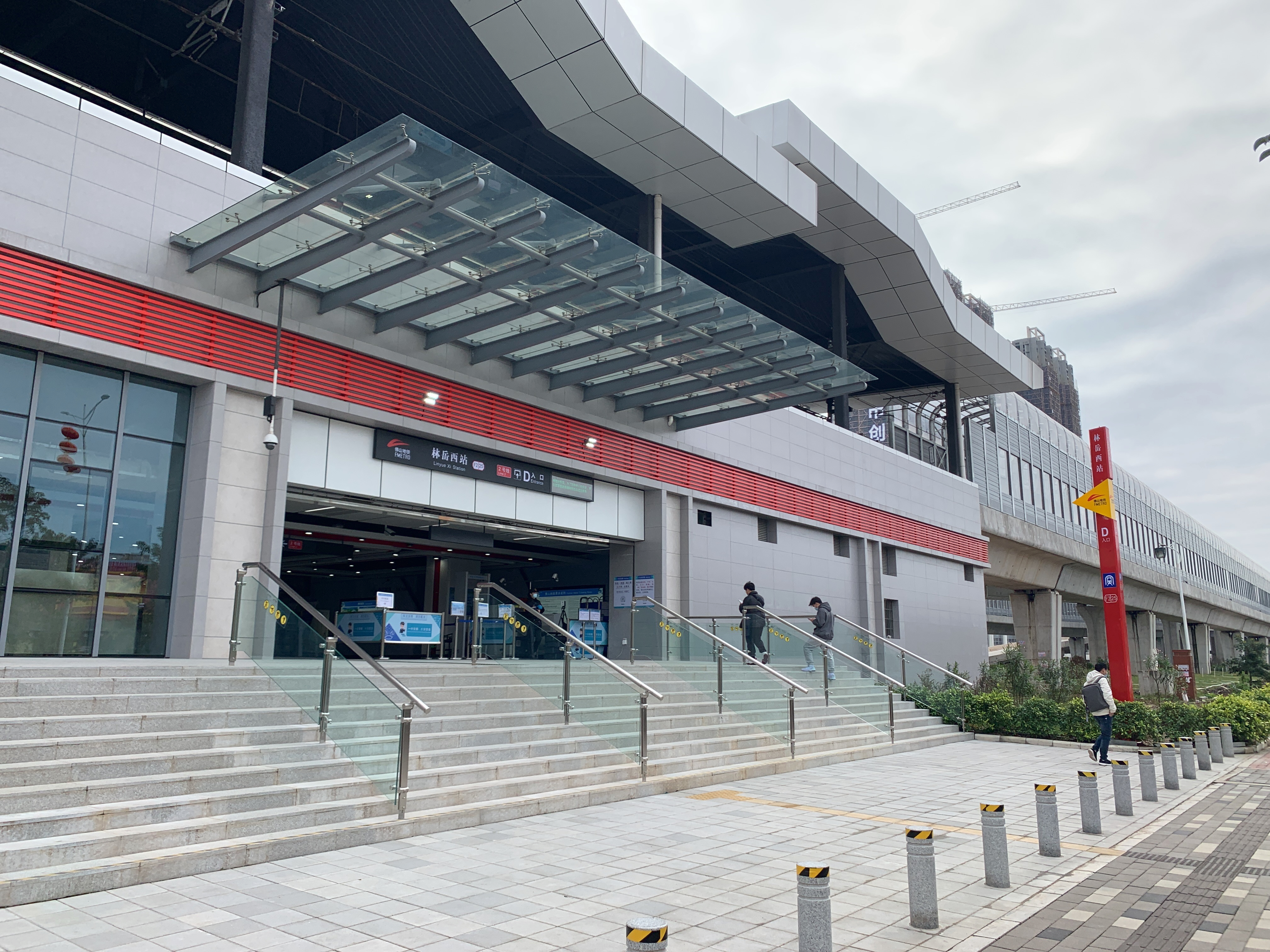
Entrance D

== Gallery ==
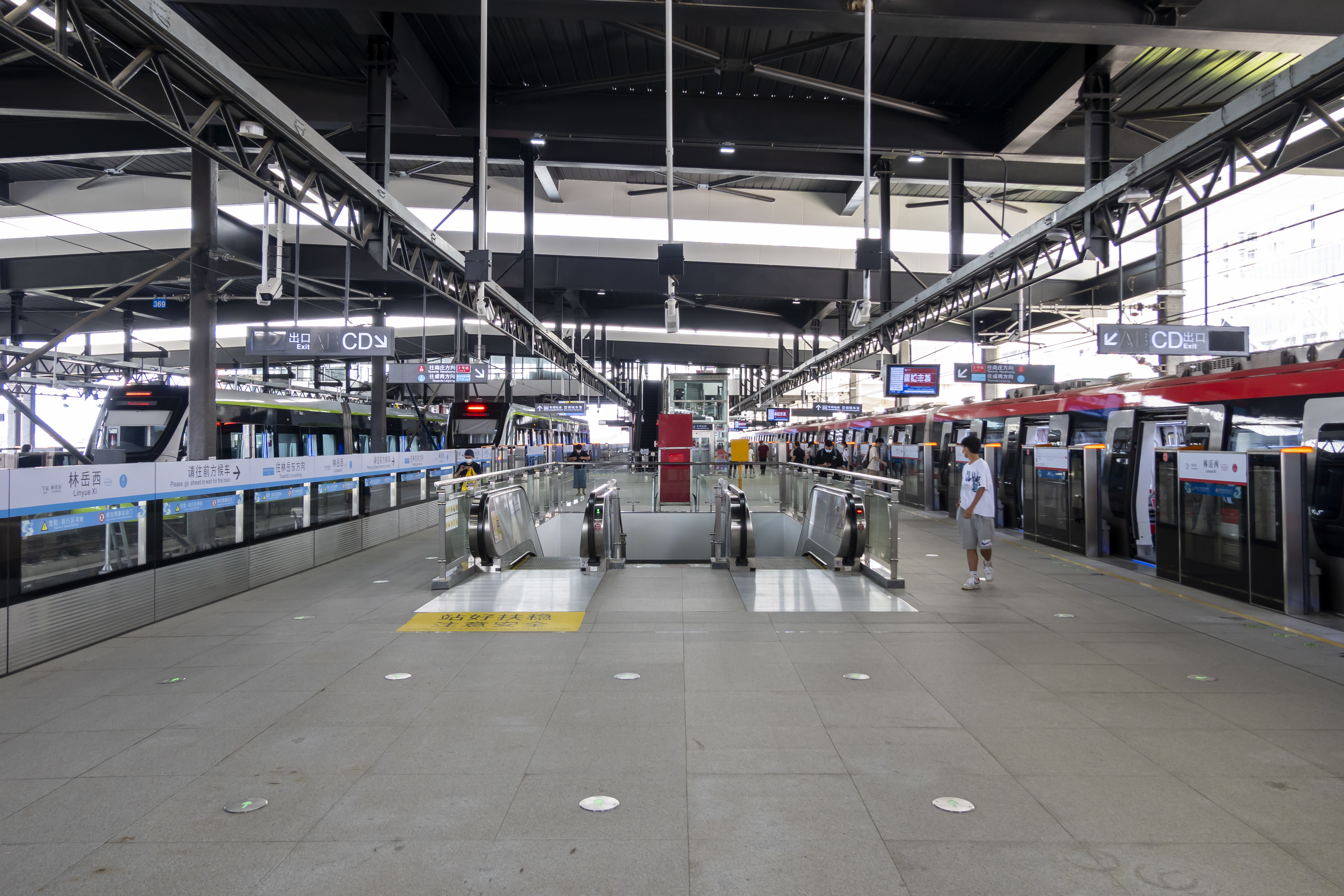
Platforms 1 & 4 (eastbound)

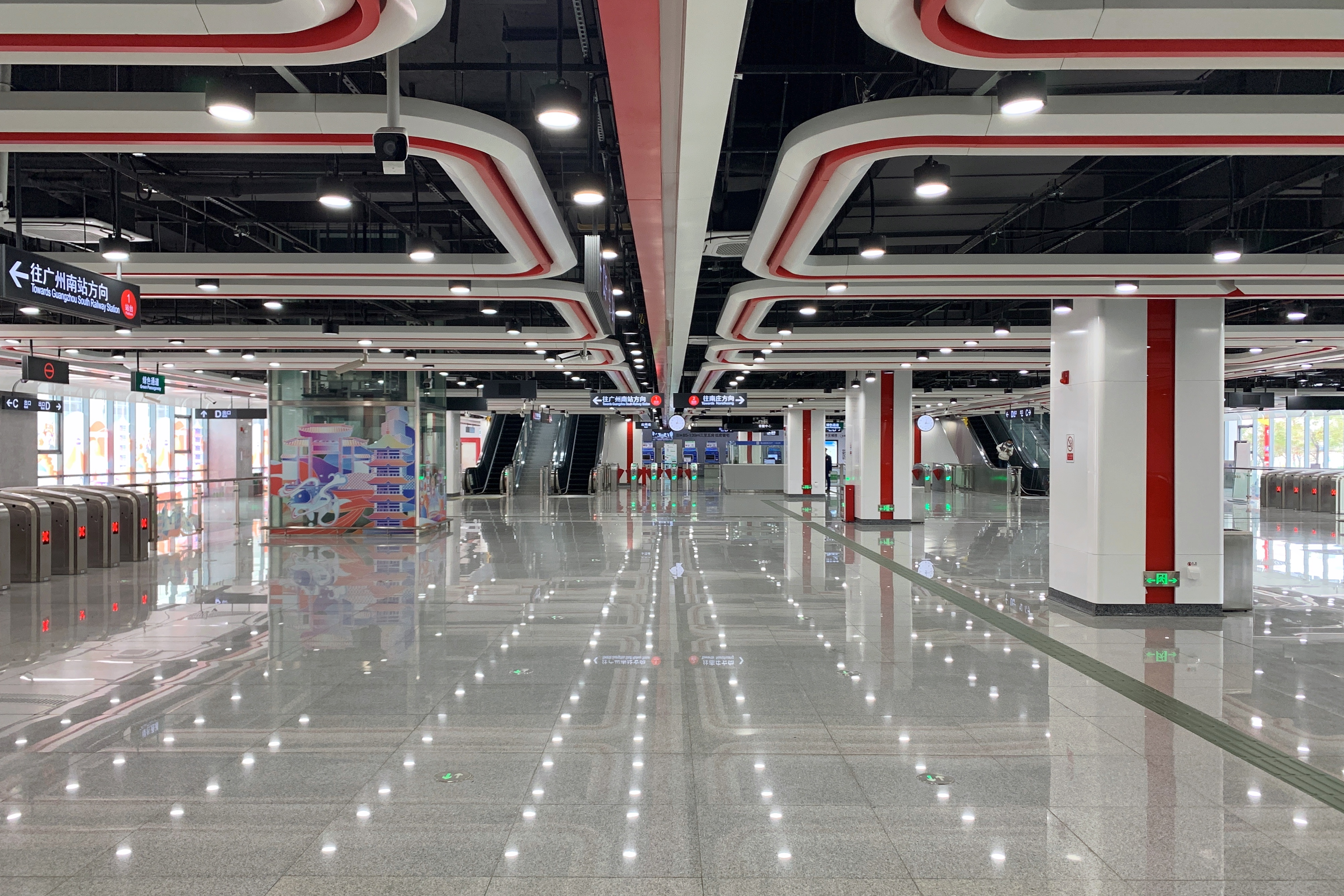
Concourse

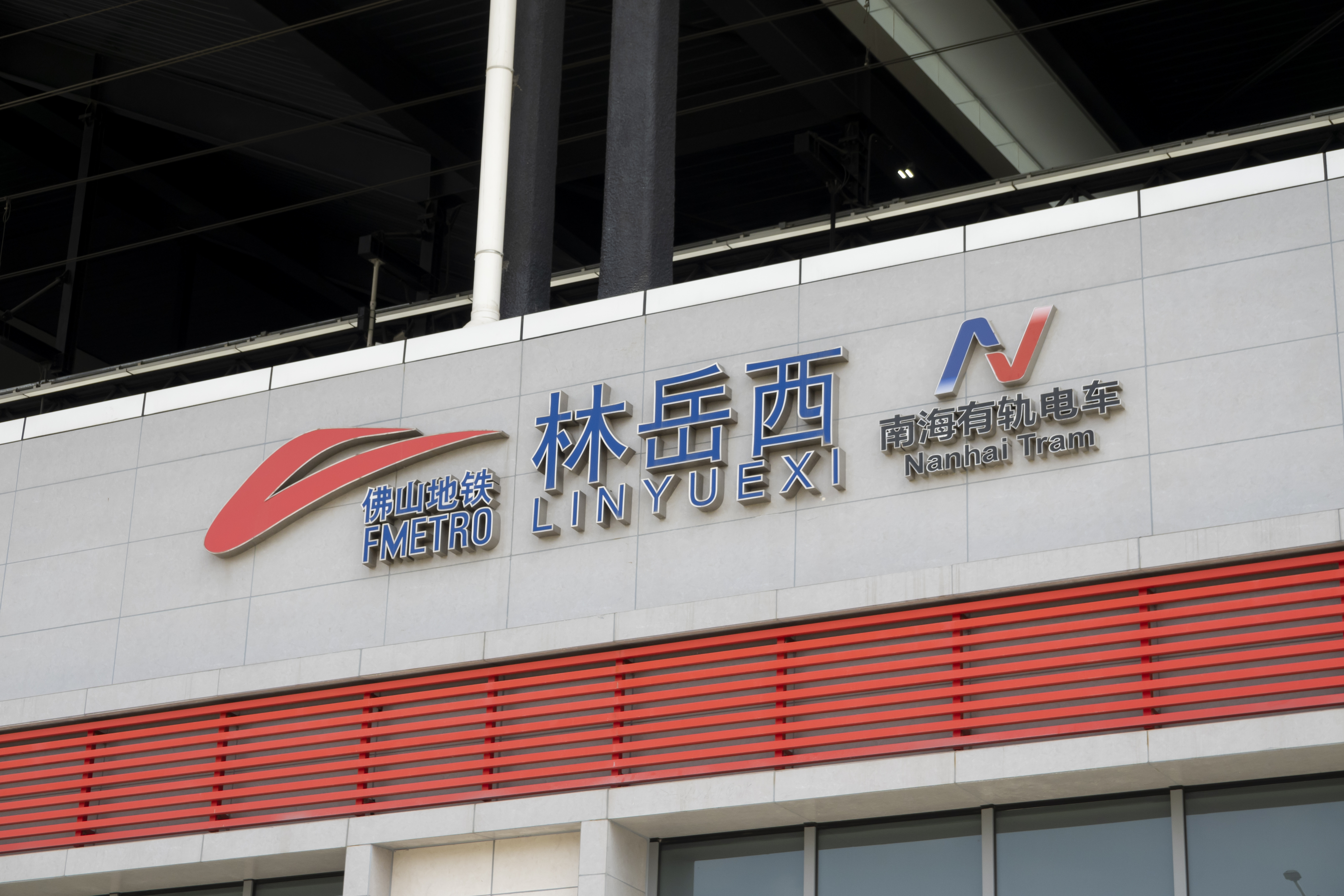
Station logo

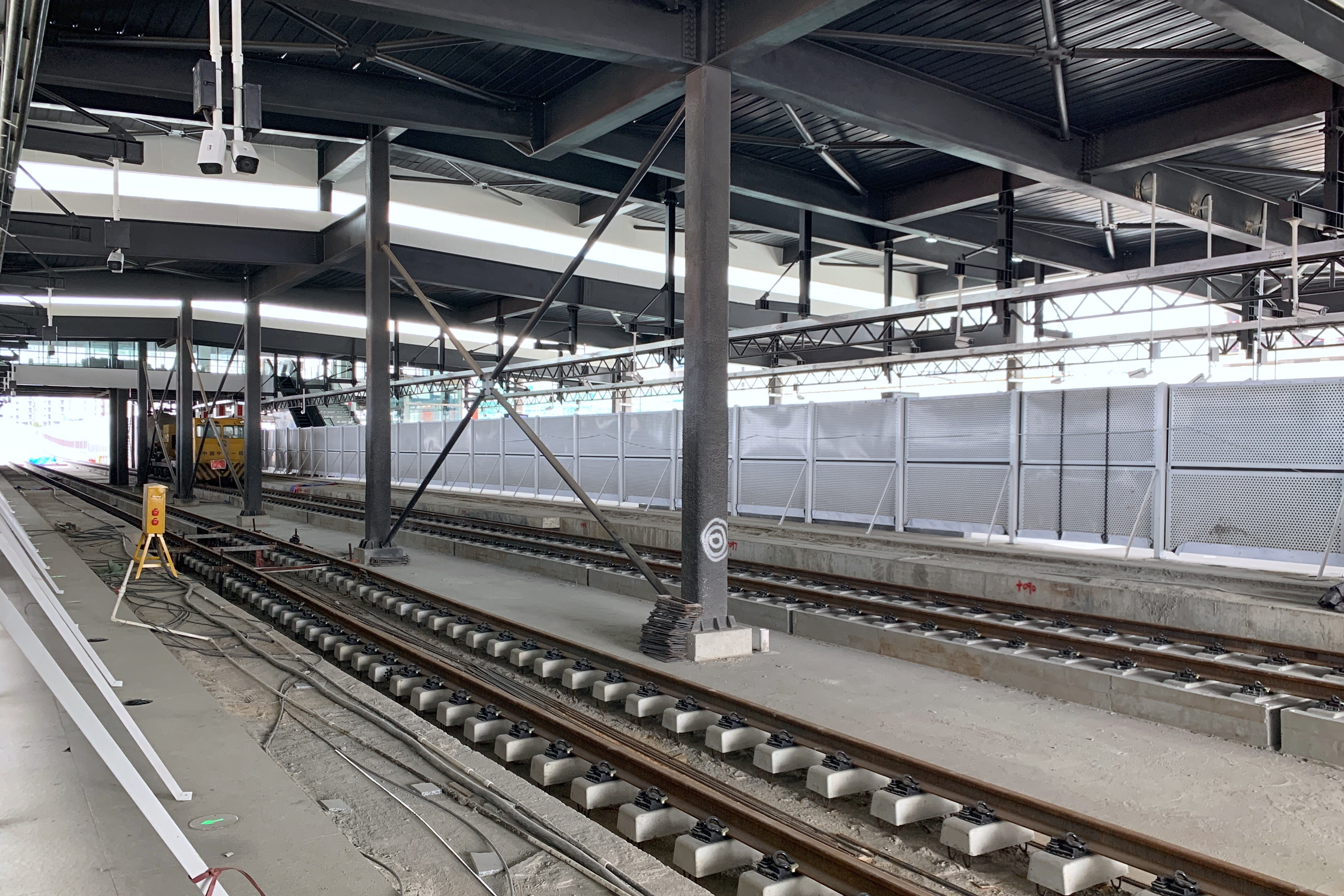
Nanhai Tram Line 1 track area (February 2022)
