= Dengzhou station =

Foshan Metro Line 2 station

Dengzhou 登洲
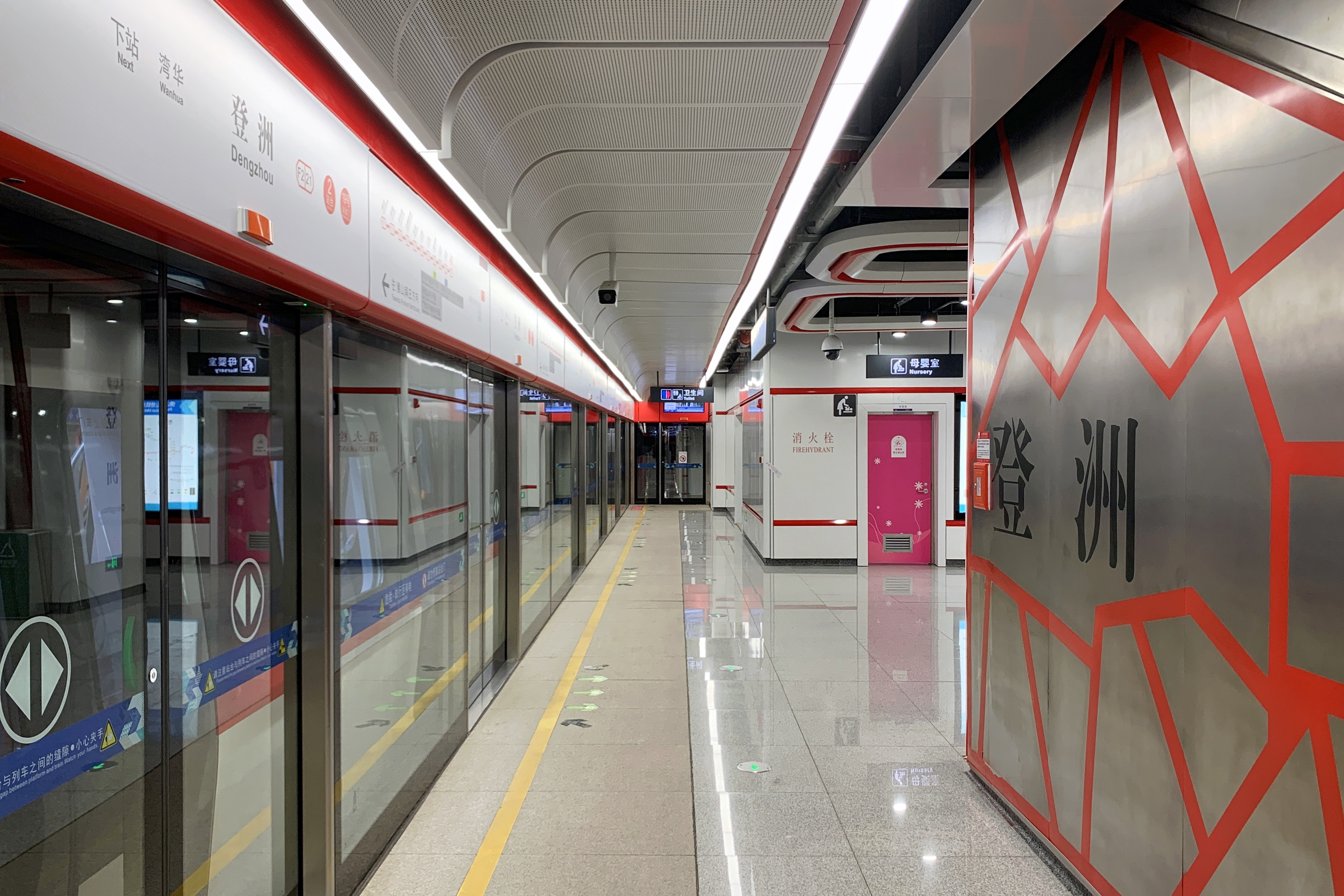
- Platform

Chinese name
- Chinese: 登洲站
Transcriptions
Standard Mandarin
- Hanyu Pinyin: Dēngzhōu Zhàn
Yue: Cantonese
- Yale Romanization: Dāngjāu Jaahm
- Jyutping: Dang^{1}zau^{1} Zaam^{6}

General information
- Location: North side of the intersection of Fochen Road (佛陈路) and Huayang South Road (华阳南路), Chencun; Shunde District, Foshan, Guangdong; China
- Coordinates: 22°58′54.30″N 113°8′37.03″E
- Operator: Foshan Metro Operation Co., Ltd.
- Line: Line 2
- Platforms: 2 (1 island platform)
- Tracks: 2

Construction
- Structure type: Underground
- Accessible: Yes

Other information
- Station code: F221

History
- Opened: 28 December 2021 (4 years ago)

Services
Preceding station	Foshan Metro	Following station
Wanhua towards Nanzhuang	Line 2	Flower World towards Guangzhou South Railway Station
Location

Dengzhou station (Chinese: 登洲站; pinyin: Dēngzhōu Zhàn; Cantonese Yale: Dāngjāu Jaahm) is a station on Line 2 of Foshan Metro, located in Foshan's Shunde District. It opened on 28 December 2021.

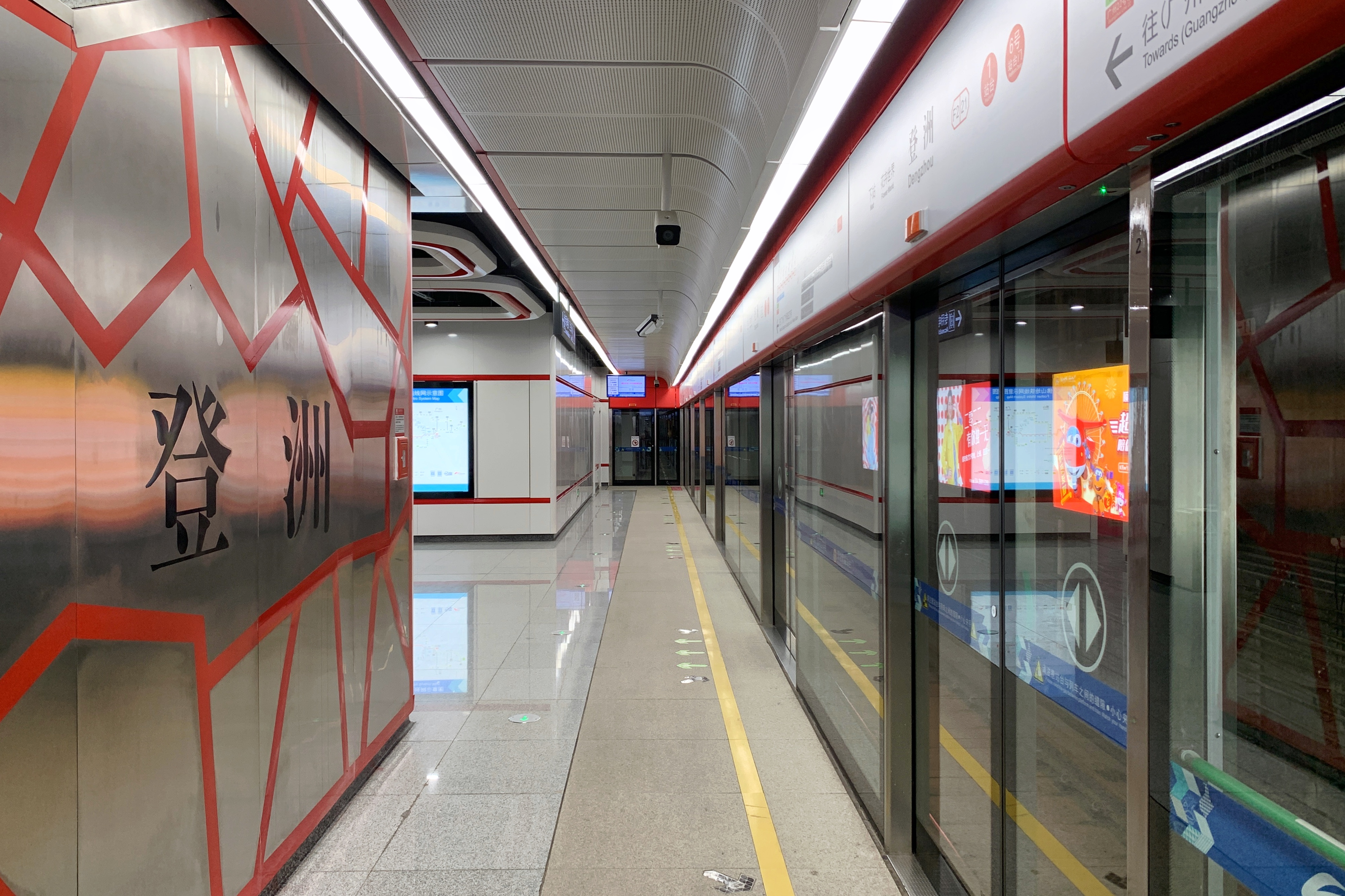
Platform 1 (towards Guangzhou South Railway Station)

== Station layout ==
The station has an island platform under Fochen Road.

G	-	Exits A & B
L1; Concourse	Lobby	Ticket Machines, Customer Service, Shops, Police Station, Security Facilities
L2; Platforms	Platform 2	2 towards Nanzhuang (Wanhua)
L2; Platforms	Island platform, doors will open on the left
L2; Platforms	Platform 1	2 towards Guangzhou South Railway Station (Flower World)

=== Entrances/exits ===
The station has 3 points of entry/exit. All exits are equipped with elevators.

- A: Fochen Road
- B1: Fochen Road
- B2: Fochen Road, Three Character Classic Cultural Park

== History ==
The station was the earliest to start construction on the initial phase of Line 2. It began construction in February 2015 and topped out in September 2016. On 28 December 2021, the station opened with the opening of Line 2.
