= Zhihui Xincheng station =

Foshan Metro Line 2 station

Zhihui Xincheng 智慧新城
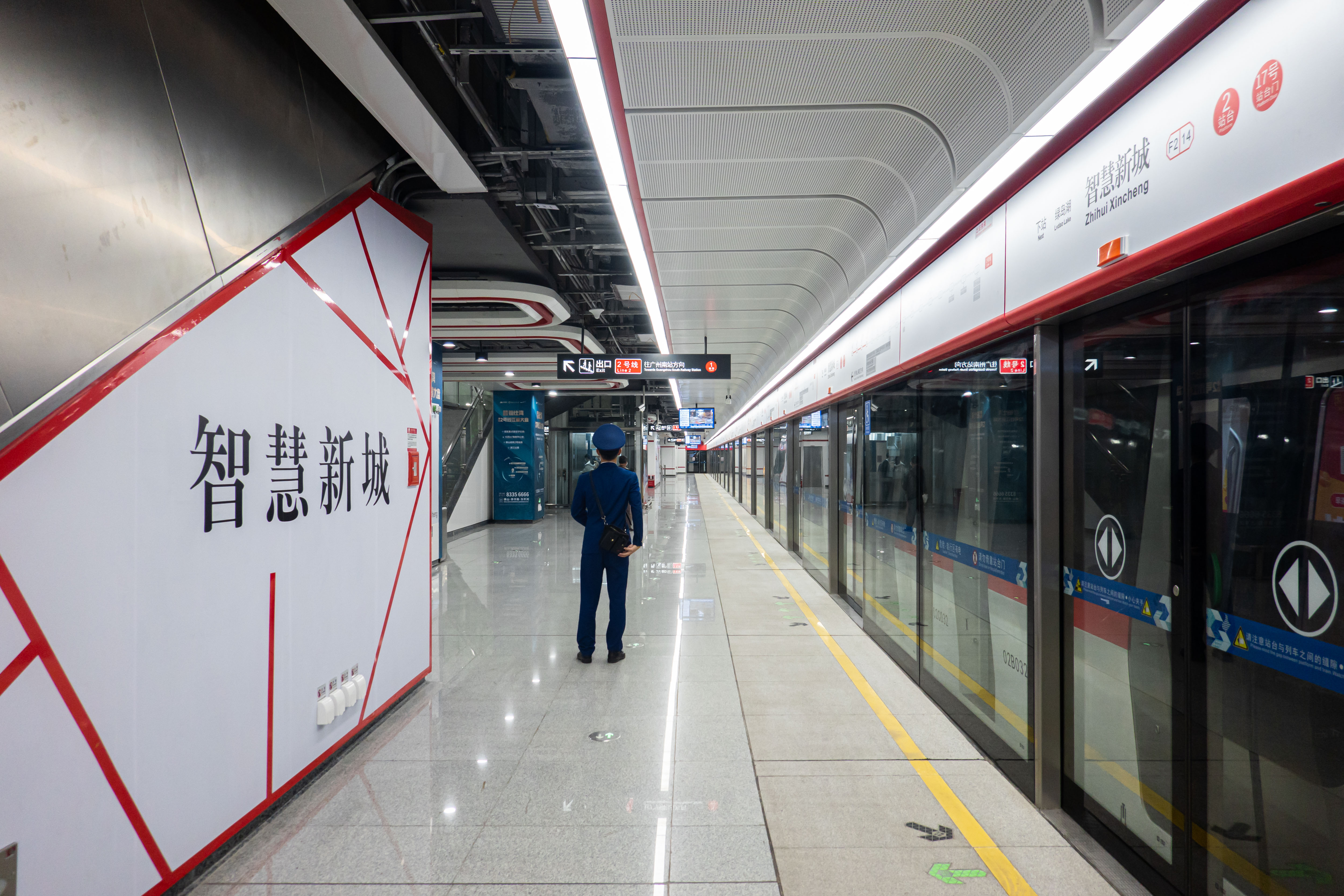
- Platform 2 (towards Nanzhuang)

Chinese name
- Chinese: 智慧新城站
Transcriptions
Standard Mandarin
- Hanyu Pinyin: Zhìhuì Xīnchéng Zhàn
Yue: Cantonese
- Yale Romanization: Jiwaih Sānsìhng Jaahm
- Jyutping: Zi^{3}wai^{6} San^{1}sing^{4} Zaam^{6}

General information
- Location: West side of the boundary of the intersection of Jihua 2nd Road (季华二路) and Guangfo Expressway (广佛高速), Zhangcha Subdistrict; Chancheng District, Foshan, Guangdong; China
- Coordinates: 23°0′49.26″N 113°2′57.24″E
- Operator: Foshan Metro Operation Co., Ltd.
- Line: Line 2
- Platforms: 4 (2 island platforms)
- Tracks: 2

Construction
- Structure type: Underground
- Accessible: Yes

Other information
- Station code: F214

History
- Opened: 28 December 2021 (4 years ago)
- Former names: Liantang (莲塘)

Services
Preceding station	Foshan Metro	Following station
Lvdao Lake towards Nanzhuang	Line 2	Zhangcha towards Guangzhou South Railway Station
Location

Zhihui Xincheng station (Chinese: 智慧新城站; pinyin: Zhìhuì Xīnchéng Zhàn; Cantonese Yale: Jiwaih Sānsìhng Jaahm; lit. 'Smart New Town station') is a station on Line 2 of Foshan Metro, located in Foshan's Chancheng District. It opened on 28 December 2021.

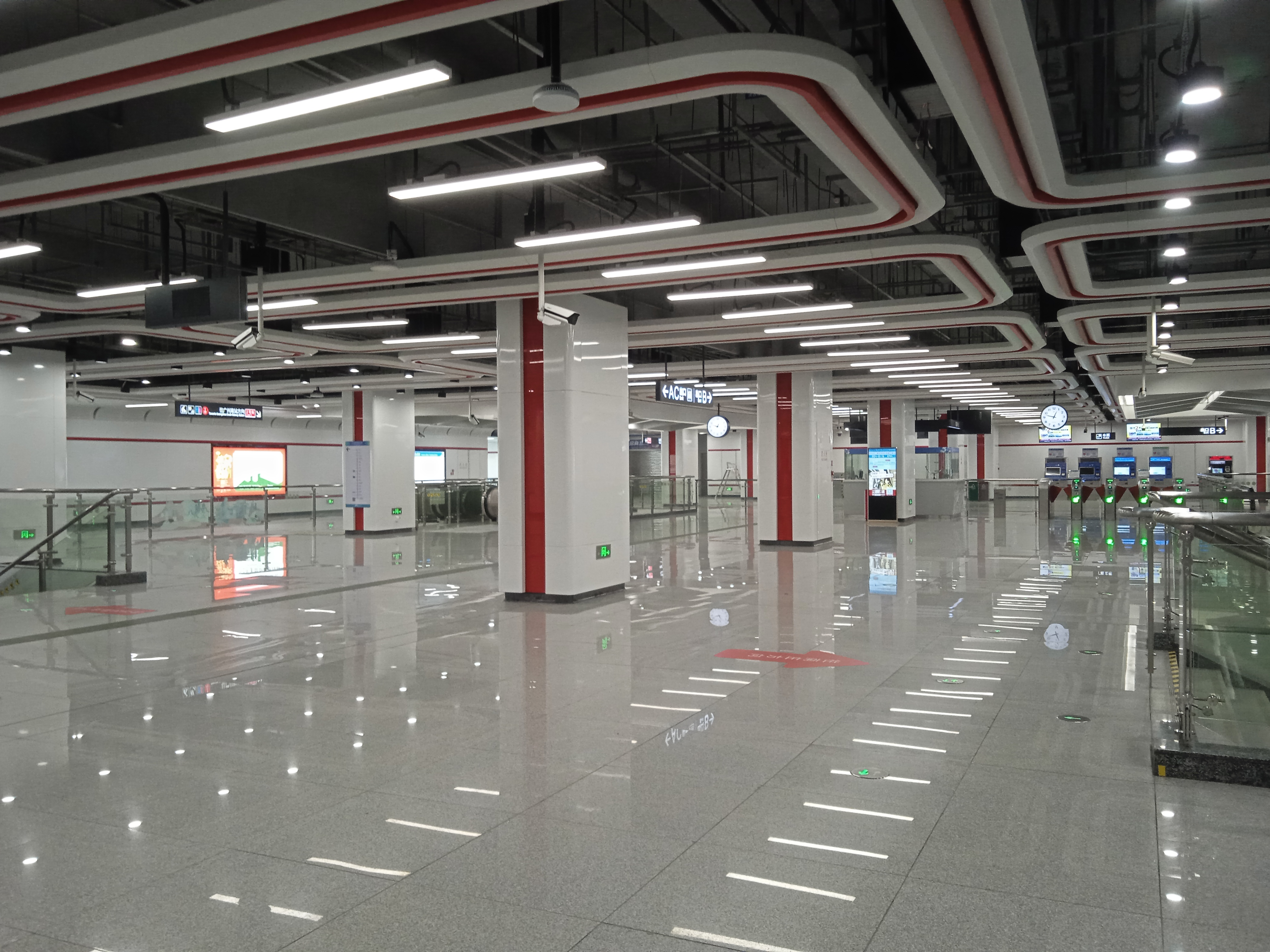
Concourse

== Station layout ==
The station has 2 island platforms under Jihua 2nd Road, the inner tracks for Line 2, the outer tracks reserved for a future cross-platform interchange with Line 4.

G	-	Exits A-D
L1; Concourse	Lobby	Ticket Machines, Customer Service, Shops, Police Station, Security Facilities
L2; Platforms		4 reserved platform
L2; Platforms	Island platform, doors will open on the left
L2; Platforms	Platform 1	2 towards Guangzhou South Railway Station (Zhangcha)
L2; Platforms	Platform 2	2 towards Nanzhuang (Lvdao Lake)
L2; Platforms	Island platform, doors will open on the left
L2; Platforms		4 reserved platform

=== Entrances/exits ===
The station has 4 points of entry/exit at the time of opening. On 28 December 2024, the passage next to Exit C of the station connecting to the superstructure property "Dongji Chanxi-Huanyu City" officially opened. Exit C2 is equipped with an elevator.

- A: Jihua 2nd Road
- B: Jihua 2nd Road, Chancheng District Administrative Service Center Smart New Town Hall
- C1: Jihua 2nd Road
- C2: Jihua 2nd Road
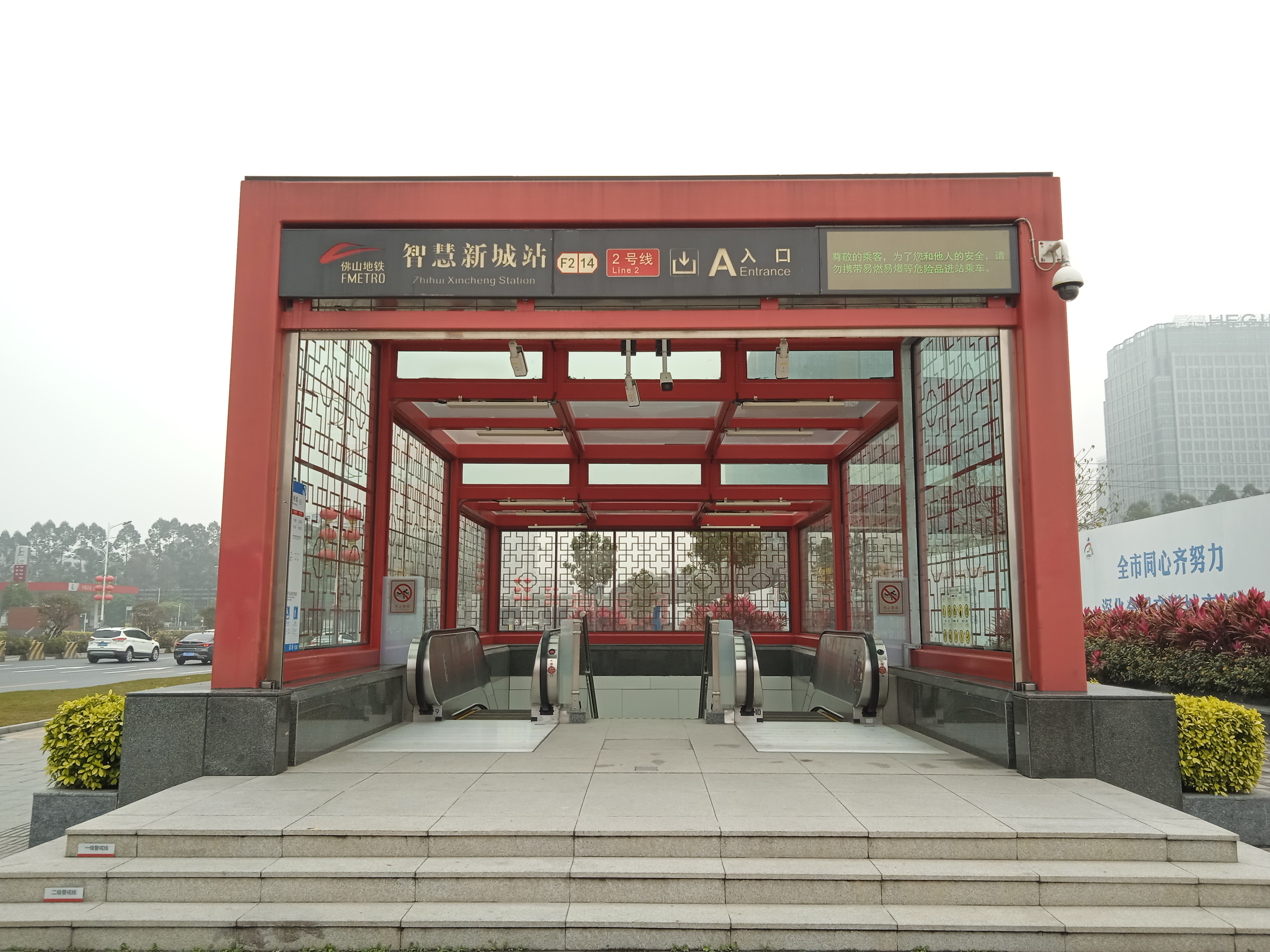
Entrance A

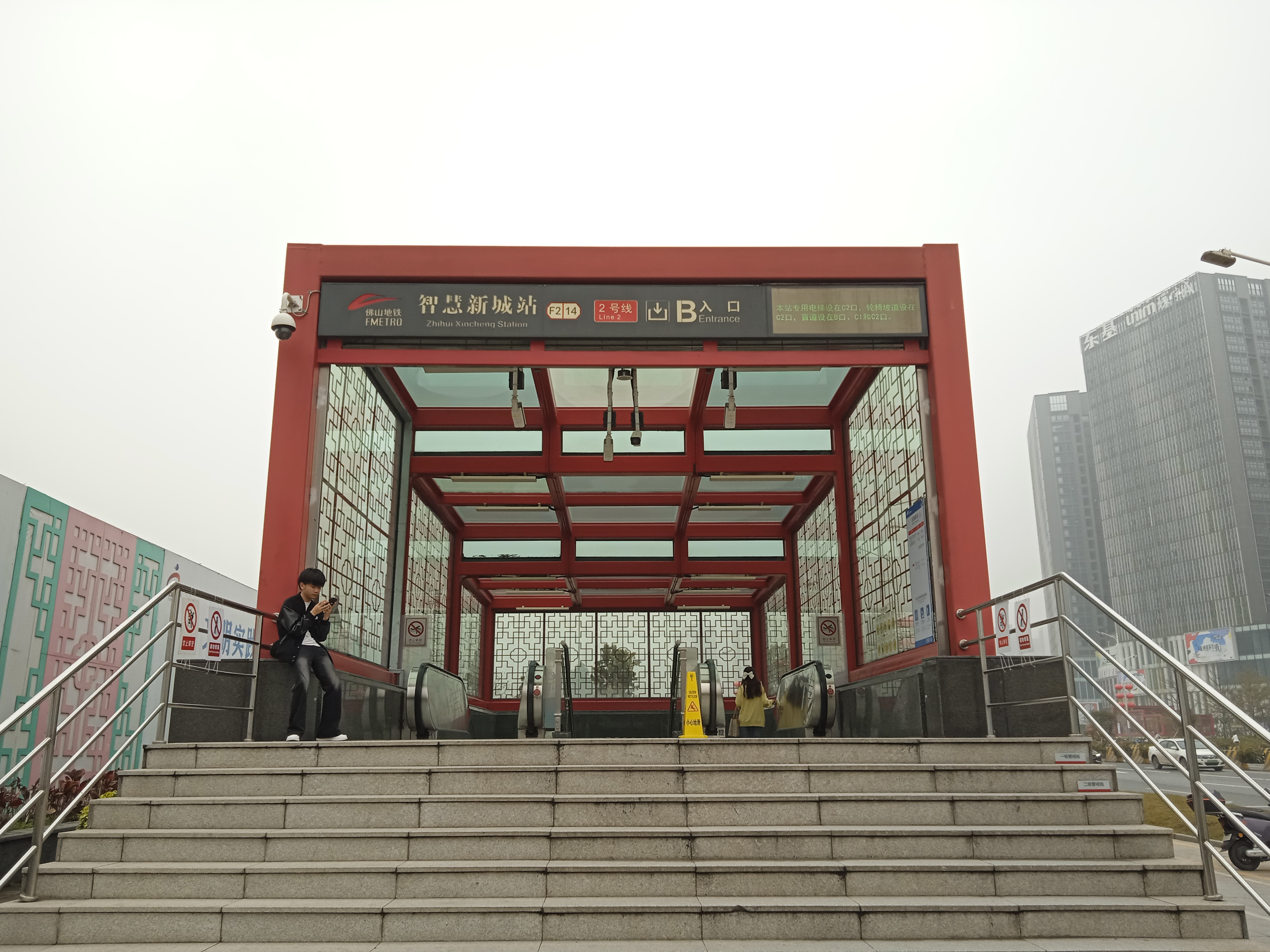
Entrance B

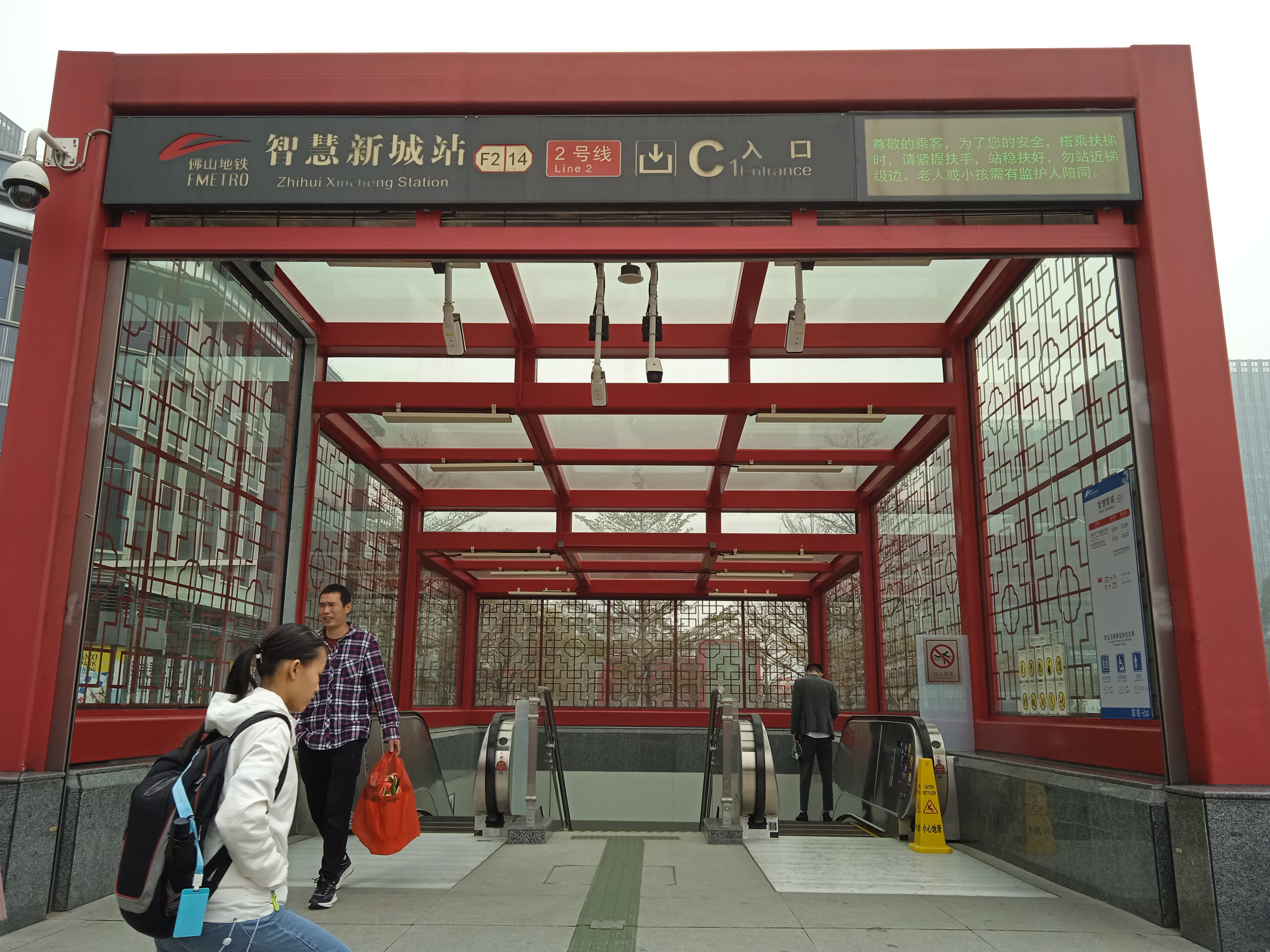
Entrance C1

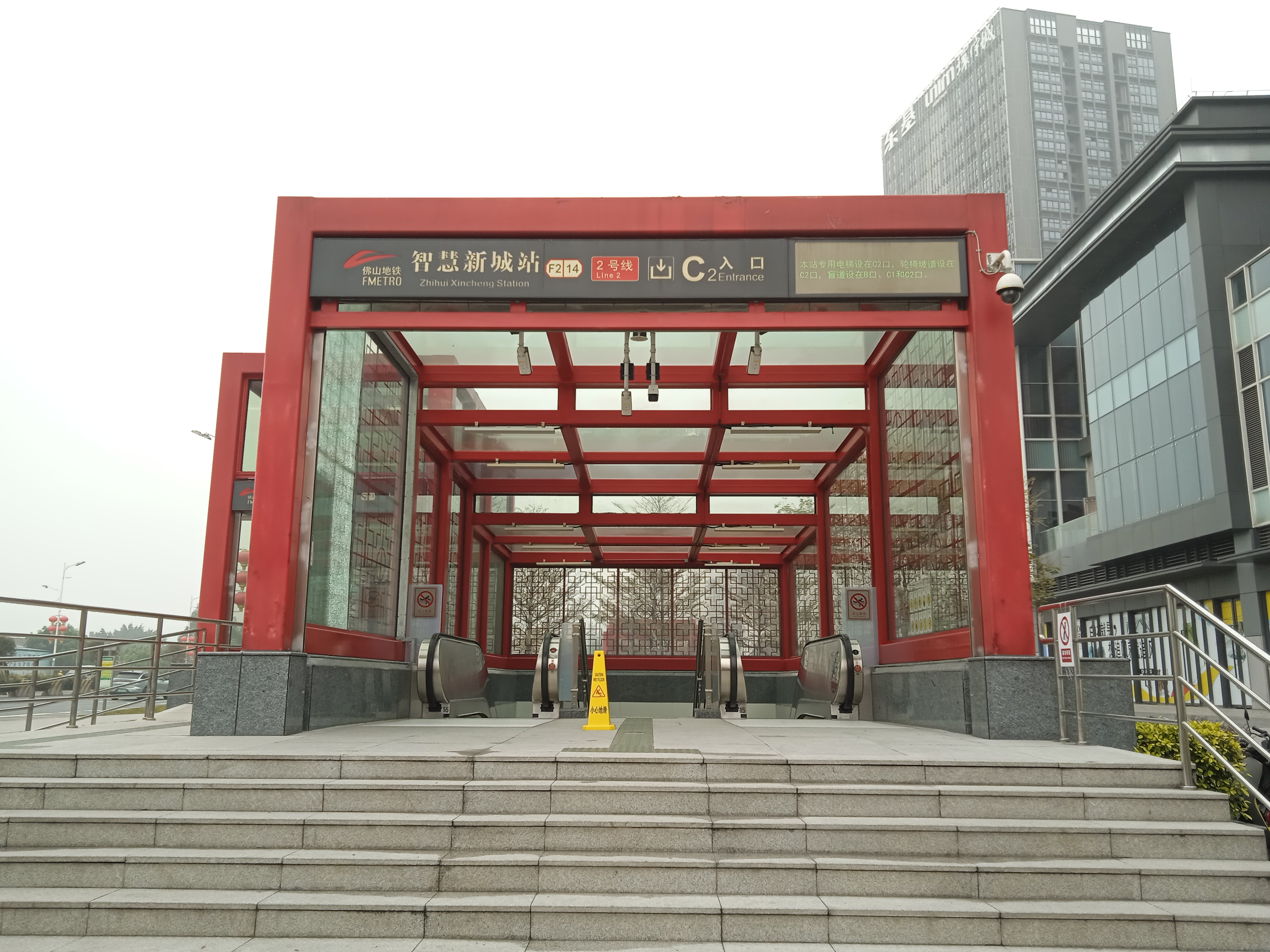
Entrance C2

== History ==
During the planning and construction phase of the station, it was named Liantang Station, which was named after the nearby village of Liantang. Due to the doubling up of the name of this station and the station of the same name on Guangzhou Metro Line 9, this station was officially renamed as Zhihui Xincheng Station in early December 2021, becoming the second station in the Guangfo Line network to be renamed due to the double up names after Baiyun Dongping. The name of the new station is taken from the nearby Smart New Town Park.
