= Lvdao Lake station =

Foshan Metro Line 2 station

Lvdao Lake 绿岛湖
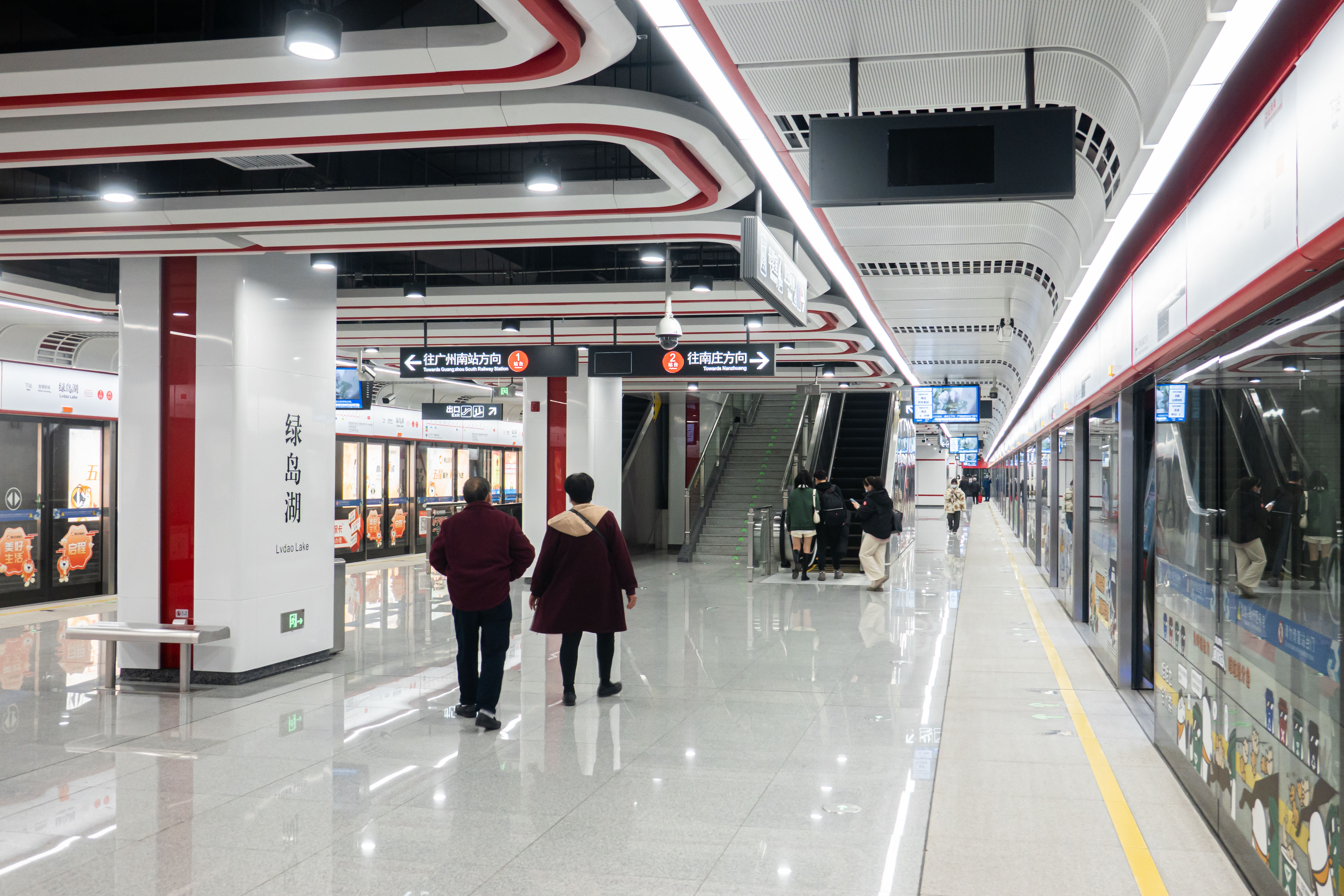
- Platform

Chinese name
- Simplified Chinese: 绿岛湖站
- Traditional Chinese: 綠島湖站
Transcriptions
Standard Mandarin
- Hanyu Pinyin: Lǜdǎo Hú Zhàn
Yue: Cantonese
- Yale Romanization: Luhkdóu Wù Jaahm
- Jyutping: Luk^{6}dou^{2} Wu^{4} Zaam^{6}

General information
- Location: West side of the intersection of Jihua West Road (季华西路) and Changang Road (禅港路), Nanzhuang; Chancheng District, Foshan, Guangdong; China
- Coordinates: 23°0′16.65″N 113°1′42.76″E
- Operator: Foshan Metro Operation Co., Ltd.
- Line: Line 2
- Platforms: 2 (1 island platform)
- Tracks: 2

Construction
- Structure type: Underground
- Accessible: Yes

Other information
- Station code: F213

History
- Opened: 28 December 2021 (4 years ago)

Services
Preceding station	Foshan Metro	Following station
Huchong towards Nanzhuang	Line 2	Zhihui Xincheng towards Guangzhou South Railway Station
Location

Lvdao Lake station (simplified Chinese: 绿岛湖站; traditional Chinese: 綠島湖站; pinyin: Lǜdǎo Hú Zhàn; Cantonese Yale: Luhkdóu Wù Jaahm; lit. 'Green Island Lake station') is a station on Line 2 of Foshan Metro, located in Foshan's Chancheng District. It opened on 28 December 2021.

The ⟨v⟩ in the station's name is a vowel letter, representing the close front rounded vowel [y]. The standard pinyin spelling would've been to use the letter ⟨ü⟩ instead, as in Lüdao Lake.

== Station layout ==
The station has an island platform under West Jihua Road.

G	-	Exits A-D
L1; Concourse	Lobby	Ticket Machines, Customer Service, Shops, Police Station, Security Facilities
L2; Platforms	Platform 2	2 towards Nanzhuang (Huchong)
L2; Platforms	Island platform, doors will open on the left
L2; Platforms	Platform 1	2 towards Guangzhou South Railway Station (Zhihui Xincheng)

=== Entrances/exits ===
The station has 4 points of entry/exit. Exit A is equipped with an elevator.

- A: Jihua West Road
- B: Jihua West Road
- C: Jihua West Road, Chancheng District Government Administrative Service Center
- D: Jihua West Road

== Construction accident ==
At about 19:00 on the evening of 7 February 2018, the tail of the shield machine at 1.35 km from the right line of Ludao Lake to Huchong suddenly permeated, and the workers tried to plug the leak unsuccessfully. At around 20:40, the permeable area of the site expanded, resulting in the deformation and damage of the tunnel segments, causing the collapse of more than 30 meters of West Jihua Road on the ground, resulting in 11 deaths, 1 missing, 8 injuries, and a direct economic loss of about 53.238 million yuan. The construction unit of this section of the project is CCCC Foshan Investment and Development Co., Ltd., the general contractor is CCCC Second Harbor Engineering Bureau Co., Ltd., and the supervision unit is Guangzhou Rail Transit Construction Supervision Co., Ltd.

The Guangdong Provincial Government later set up an investigation team to investigate the accident, and the investigation report was officially released on 30 July 2018. The investigation team determined that the immediate cause of the accident was as follows:

"First, there is a deep water-rich silt layer in the accident section and is close to a strong permeable medium and coarse sand layer, the groundwater is confined, and the risk of permeable sand and mud collapse is high when the shield machine passes through the section; Second, the sealing performance of the shield tail sealing device decreases during use, and the shield tail seal is broken down by external water and soil pressure, resulting in a permeable sand gushing channel; Third, under the serious condition of mud and sand, the rescue operation was continued in the tunnel, and the evacuation was not timely; Fourth, after the tunnel structure is damaged, a large amount of sediment quickly pours into the tunnel, forming a strong sediment flow and air waves in the narrow space to impact the direction of the tunnel entrance, resulting in the failure of some personnel to escape, resulting in serious consequences of casualties."

The investigation team put forward suggestions on the handling of the 33 responsible personnel. Among them, 1 person who died in the accident was exempted from accountability, 2 enterprise personnel have been investigated by the public security organs and compulsory measures have been taken, 1 person has been handled in a separate case, and the rest of the enterprise and government officials have been recommended to be given corresponding party discipline and government sanctions and accountability.

In the early morning of 16 June 2019, water leakage occurred in the tunnel during the freezing operation of the connecting channel in the Hulu section, and no casualties were caused at the scene. The accident resulted in the temporary closure of West Jihua Road (Chanxiu Road to the bottom of the First Ring Bridge) to two-way traffic.
