= Huchong station =

Foshan Metro Line 2 station

Huchong 湖涌
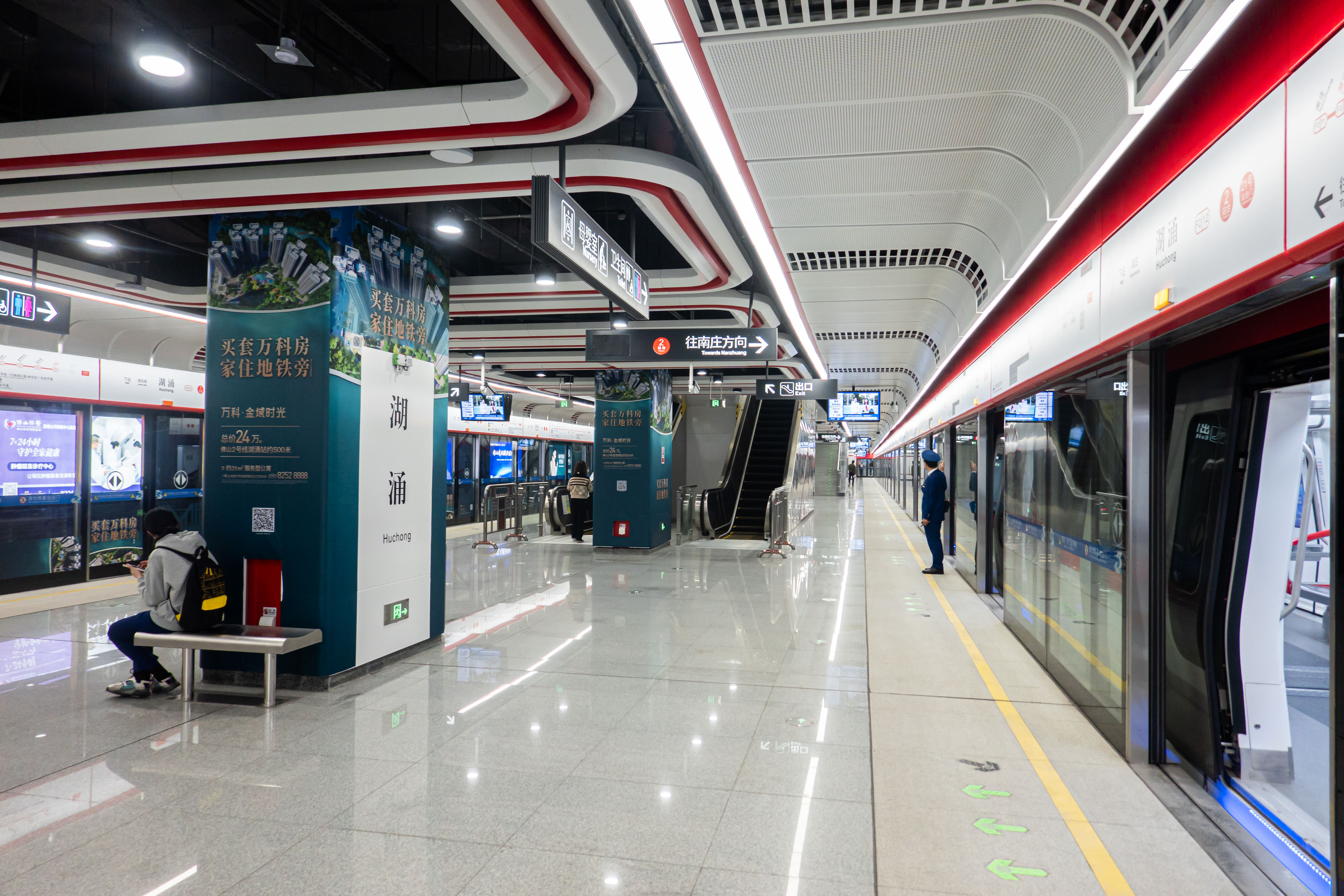
- Platform

Chinese name
- Chinese: 湖涌站
Transcriptions
Standard Mandarin
- Hanyu Pinyin: Húchōng Zhàn
Yue: Cantonese
- Yale Romanization: Wùchūng Jaahm
- Jyutping: Wu^{4}cung^{1} Zaam^{6}

General information
- Location: North of Jihua West Road (季华西路), south of Aobianchong (澳边涌), Nanzhuang; Chancheng District, Foshan, Guangdong; China
- Coordinates: 23°0′20.58″N 113°0′21.80″E
- Operator: Foshan Metro Operation Co., Ltd.
- Line: Line 2
- Platforms: 2 (1 island platform)
- Tracks: 2

Construction
- Structure type: Underground
- Accessible: Yes

Other information
- Station code: F212

History
- Opened: 28 December 2021 (4 years ago)

Services
Preceding station	Foshan Metro	Following station
Nanzhuang Terminus	Line 2	Lvdao Lake towards Guangzhou South Railway Station
Location

Huchong station (Chinese: 湖涌站; pinyin: Húchōng Zhàn; Cantonese Yale: Wùchūng Jaahm) is a station on Line 2 of Foshan Metro, located in Foshan's Chancheng District. It opened on 28 December 2021.

On the north side of the station is the Huchong Stabling Yard, and there is a supporting TOD project built on top of it.

== Station layout ==
The station has an island platform under an area north of West Jihua Road and south of Aobianchong.

G	-	Exits A & B
L1; Concourse	Lobby	Ticket Machines, Customer Service, Shops, Police Station, Security Facilities
L2; Platforms	Platform 2	2 towards Nanzhuang (terminus)
L2; Platforms	Island platform, doors will open on the left
L2; Platforms	Platform 1	2 towards Guangzhou South Railway Station (Lvdao Lake)

=== Entrances/exits ===
The station has 4 points of entry/exit, of which Exits A2 and A3 were not opened at the initial stage of opening, and instead they were opened on 1 March 2023. Exit B is equipped with an elevator.

- A1, A2, A3: Jihua West Road
- B: Jihua West Road
