= Line 2 (Foshan Metro) =

Metro line in Foshan, China

- 2
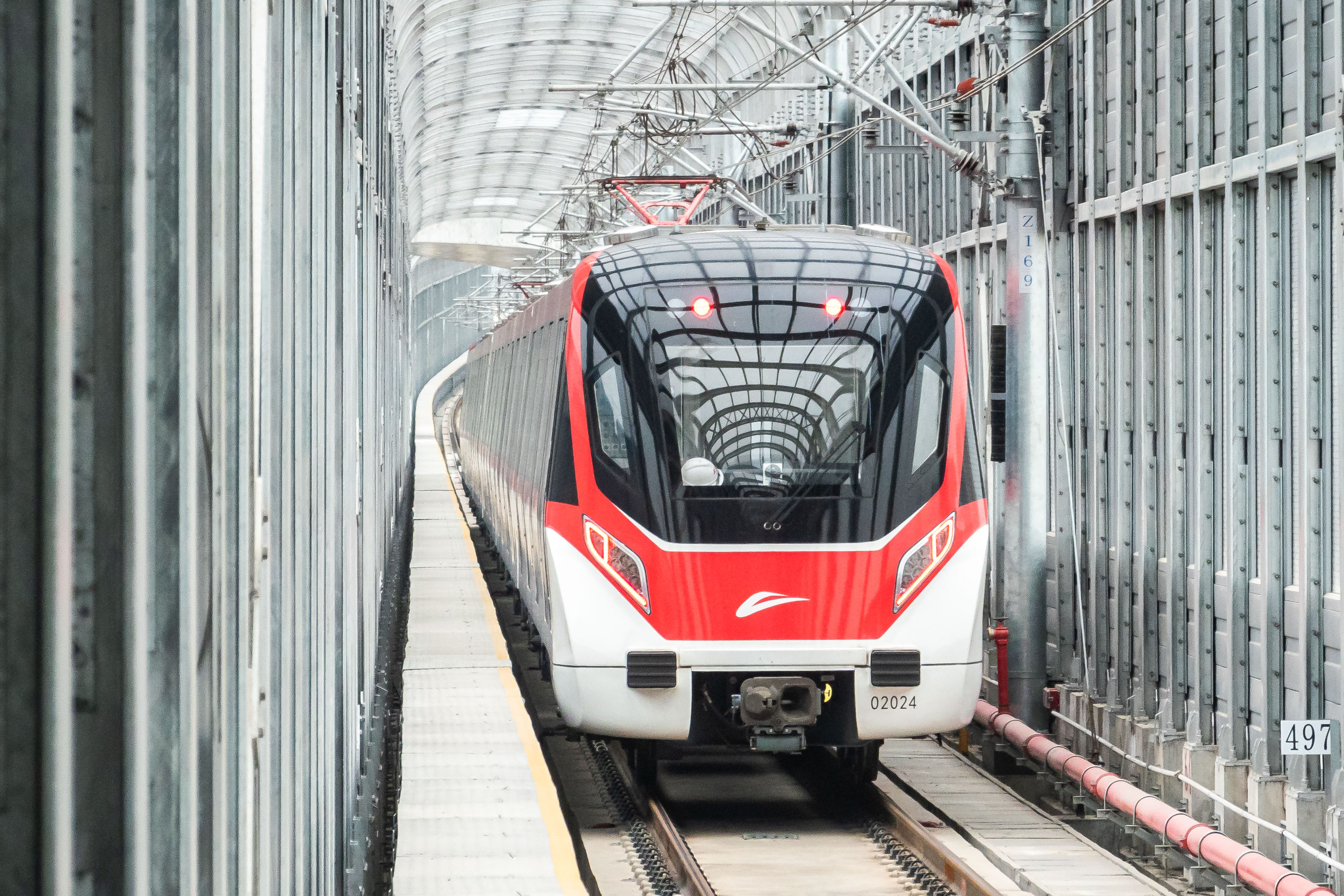
- Line 2 train near Linyue Xi

Overview
- Other name(s): M2 (FS 2011 plan name); South-West line (Chinese: 西南线)
- Status: In operation
- Owner: CCCC-Foshan Investment Development Co., Ltd.
- Locale: Guangzhou (Panyu district) and Foshan (Nanhai, Shunde and Chancheng districts); Guangdong
- Termini: Nanzhuang; Guangzhou South Railway Station
- Stations: 17

Service
- Type: Rapid transit
- System: Foshan Metro
- Services: 1
- Operator: Foshan Metro Operation Co., Ltd.

History
- Opened: 28 December 2021; 4 years ago

Technical
- Line length: 32.4 km (20.1 mi)
- Number of tracks: 2
- Character: Underground and elevated
- Track gauge: 1,435 mm (4 ft 8 1/2 in)
- Electrification: 1,500 V DC (Overhead lines)
- Operating speed: 90 km/h (56 mph)

Line 2 of Foshan Metro (FMetro) (Chinese: 佛山地铁2号线; pinyin: Fóshān Dìtiě Èr Hào Xiàn) is a metro line in Foshan. It runs in a south-west direction, connecting Guangzhou South Railway Station and Nanzhuang. It opened on 28 December 2021.

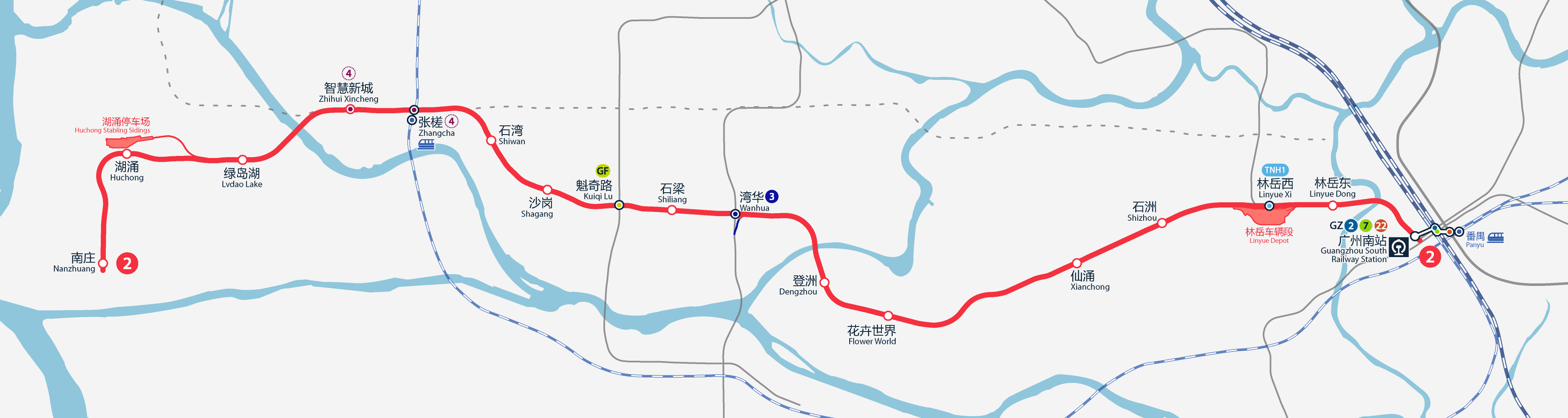
Map of Line 2 drawn to scale.

== Stations ==
Station № (Note: Stations 1-10 are on Phase 2, which is currently under planning.)	Station name		Connections	Future Connections	Location	
Station №	English	Chinese	Connections	Future Connections	Location	
F211	Nanzhuang	南庄			Chancheng	Foshan
F212	Huchong	湖涌			Chancheng	Foshan
F213	Lvdao Lake	绿岛湖			Chancheng	Foshan
F214	Zhihui Xincheng	智慧新城		4	Chancheng	Foshan
F215	Zhangcha	张槎	ZAA GZ	4	Chancheng	Foshan
F216	Shiwan	石湾			Chancheng	Foshan
F217	Shagang	沙岗			Chancheng	Foshan
F218	Kuiqi Lu	魁奇路	Guangfo GF05		Chancheng	Foshan
F219	Shiliang	石梁			Chancheng	Foshan
F220	Wanhua	湾华	3 F320		Chancheng	Foshan
F221	Dengzhou	登洲			Shunde	Foshan
F222	Flower World	花卉世界			Shunde	Foshan
F223	Xianchong	仙涌			Shunde	Foshan
F224	Shizhou	石洲			Shunde	Foshan
F225	Linyue Xi	林岳西	TNH1 TNH114		Nanhai	Foshan
F226	Linyue Dong	林岳东	TNH1 TNH115 (OSI)	11	Nanhai	Foshan
F227	Guangzhou South Railway Station	广州南站	2 201 7 701 22 2203; IZQ Guangzhu GSH; PYA Guangzhao GH ER		Panyu	Guangzhou

=== Phase 2 ===
Station	Station name		Connections	Future Connections	Location	
Station	English	Chinese	Connections	Future Connections	Location	
F201	Xi'an	西安			Gaoming	Foshan
F202	Gaoming	高明			Gaoming	Foshan
F203	Hecheng	荷城		TGM1	Gaoming	Foshan
F204	Pingsha Island	平沙岛			Nanhai	Foshan
F205	Guantai Lu	官太路			Nanhai	Foshan
F206	Xiqiao	西樵			Nanhai	Foshan
F207	Xiqiao Mountain	西樵山			Nanhai	Foshan
F208	Qiaodan Lu	樵丹路			Nanhai	Foshan
F209	Xiqiao Coach Terminal	西樵客运站			Nanhai	Foshan
F210	Jili	吉利			Chancheng	Foshan
