= Wangjiegang Park =

Park in Chacheng, China

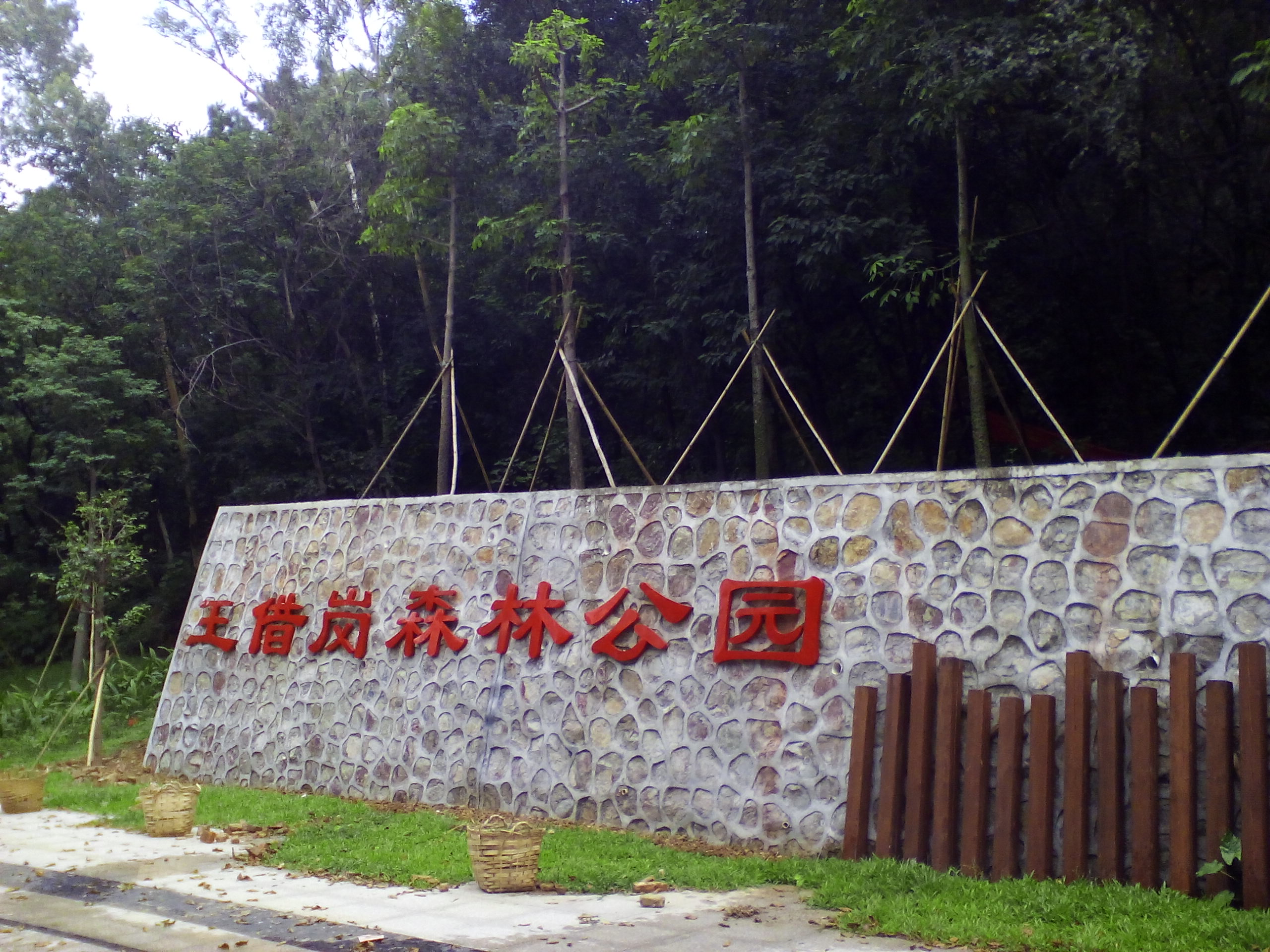
Wangjiegang Park

Wangjiegang Park located in Chancheng District, Foshan City, Guangdong Province, is a public park centering on a small volcano measuring about 60 meters in height. The volcanic hill is some 52 million years old. According to geologists, its basalt prismatic joint is unusual in China. The park opened in September, 2015 and is free to the public.

== Historical origin ==
According to the volume of 《佛山忠义乡志》, Wangjiegang was a famous ancient volcano in Foshan. Until the Qing dynasty, it had been regarded as an important place of interest in the city, attracting many visitors due to its unique geographical features. Another volume of 《南海县志》 recorded the mountain as “高三十余丈，当浈（北江）、郁（西江）二水之衡，孤峙河岸，大富环其麓，山产石如剑戟，然开采则盗频兴，明御史屠应坤奏封之”.

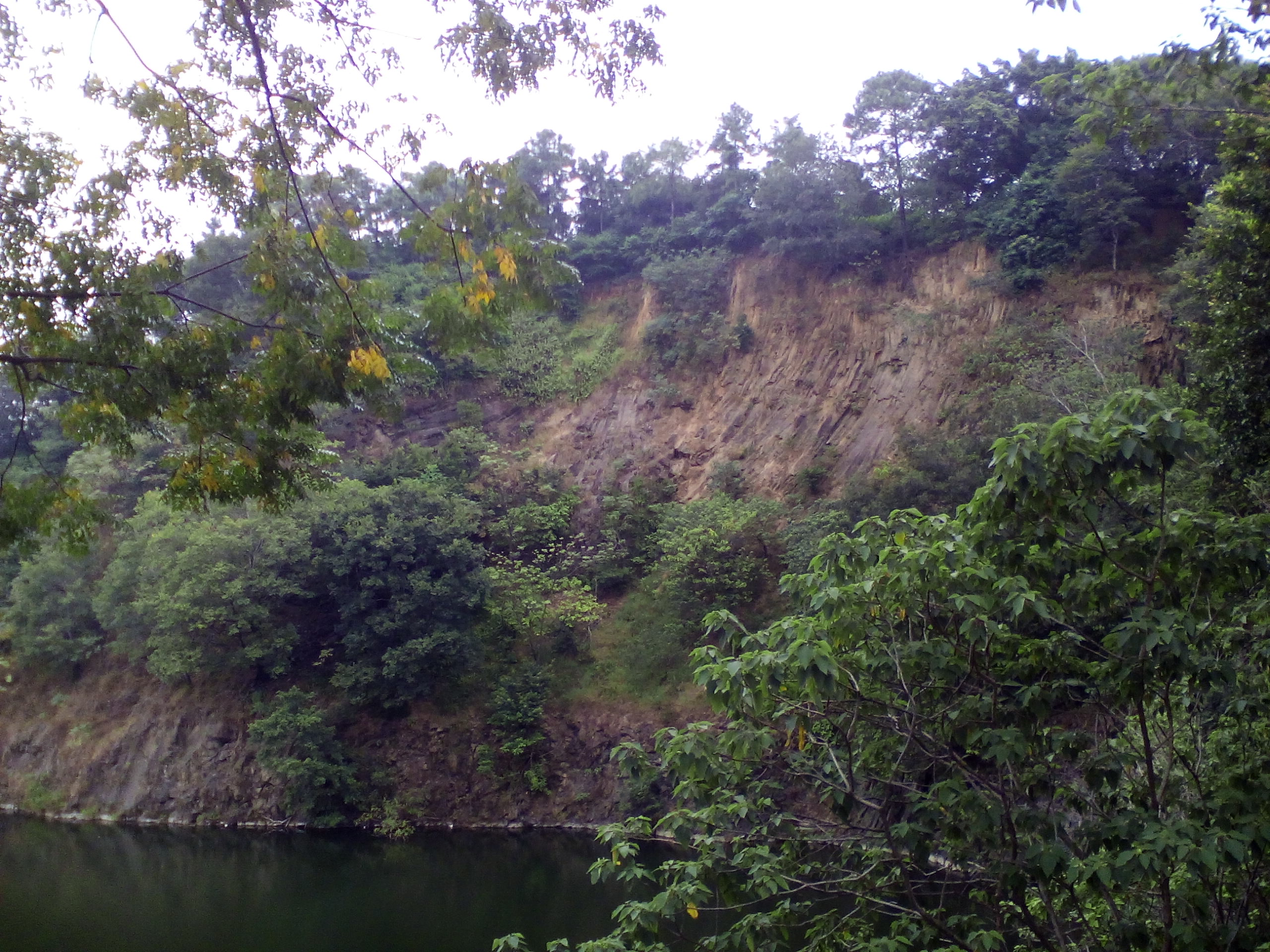
Wangjiegang Hill

In 1984, Du Xuecheng, an expert in the Department of Geology in Foshan University, re-discovered Wangjiegang while in the field doing extracurricular practice with his students. Du and his students explored the mountain and were amazed by the geological textures on its upper portion. Professor Du was particularly excited to discover the mountain's basalt prismatic joint, a feature he'd previously encountered only in books. Because of the special value of the sites, he convinced other geologists to immediately begin a survey of the mountain. It has since attracted the attention of many visitors and experts. Due principally to Wangjiegang's volcanic character, the government of Foshan closed the quarry near it and in 1985 declared the area a nature preserve. Today, Wangjiegang is a beautiful park encompassing hills and surrounding regions and provides people green trees, clear water, and nice air. Other, adjacent areas of interest include the Shakou ecology garden, Dongping river wetland park and the Shakou ravine park.

== Geography features ==
Wangjiegang is a small hill made of basalt. It is an important geological structure for the study of the ancient geographical environment of the Pearl River Delta.

== Main attractions ==
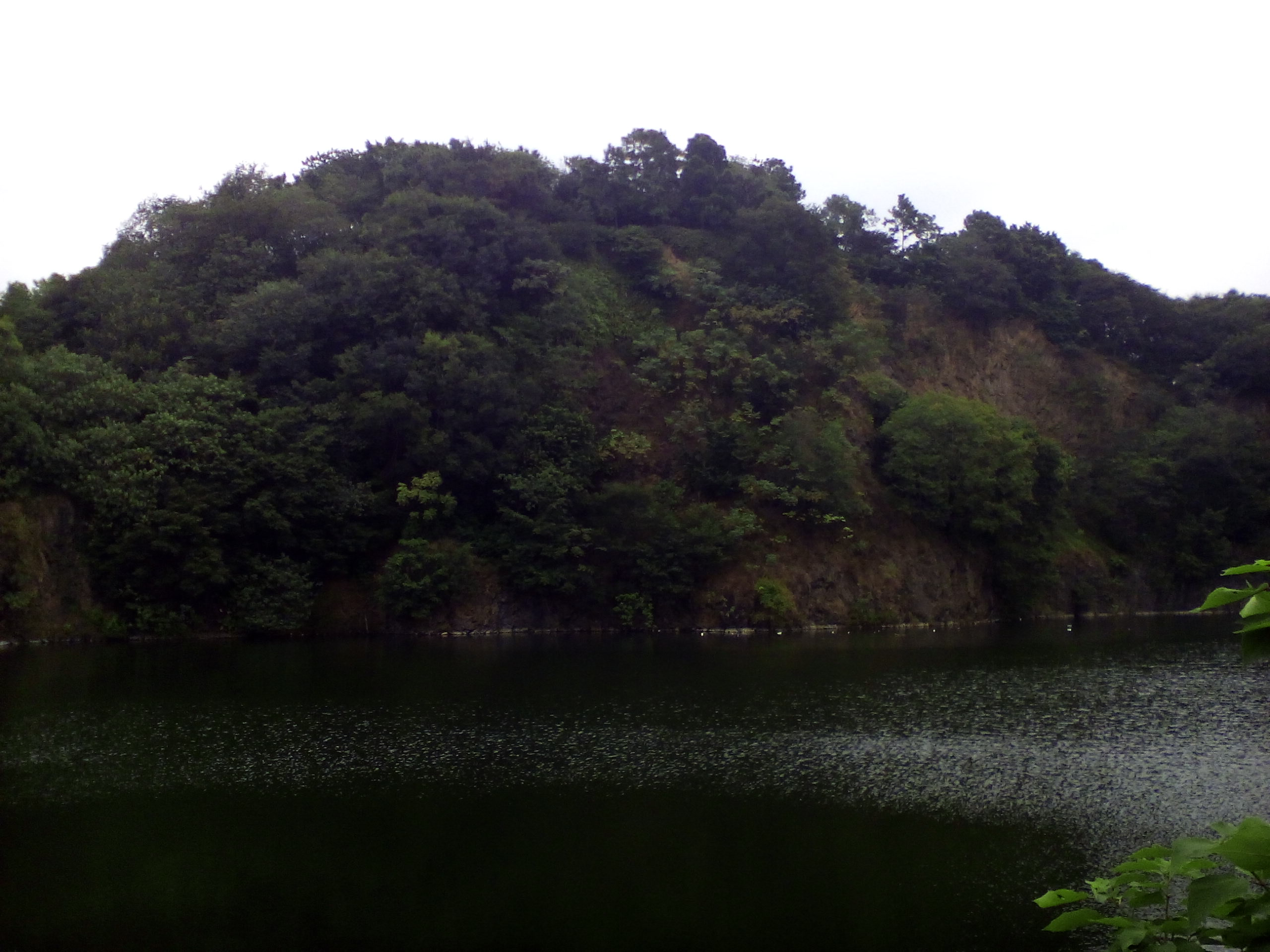
Central Lake

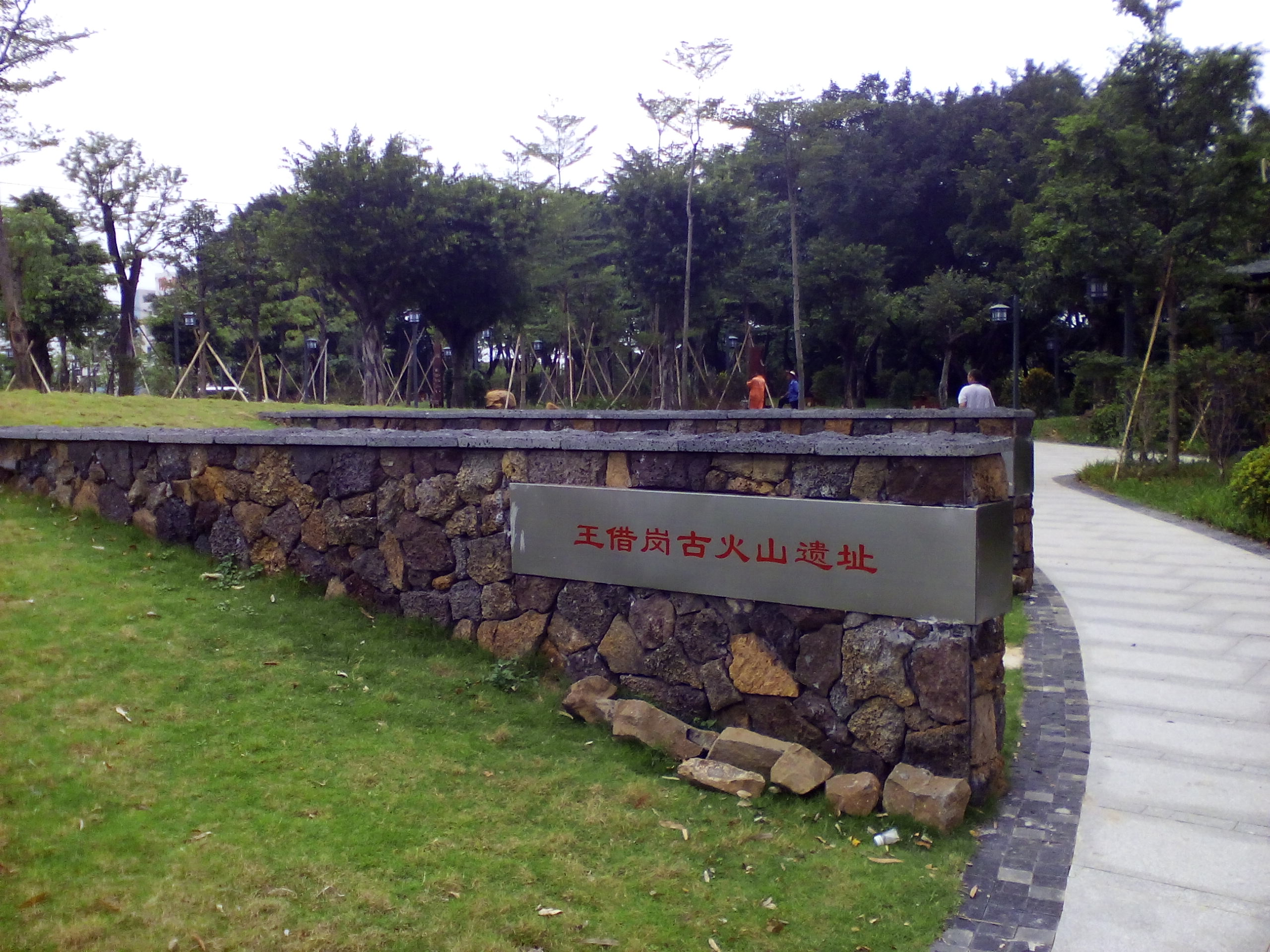
Scientific Activities Area

The design of Wangjiegang Park was inspired by volcanic eruption and magma flow. The park is divided into 3 functional areas and has 3 entrances.

=== Central Lake ===
With a volcanic lake about 11000 square meters, Wangjiegang is well known for its two kilometers of walkable shoreline, which affords the public close views of the ancient volcanic landscape.

=== Viewing Platform ===
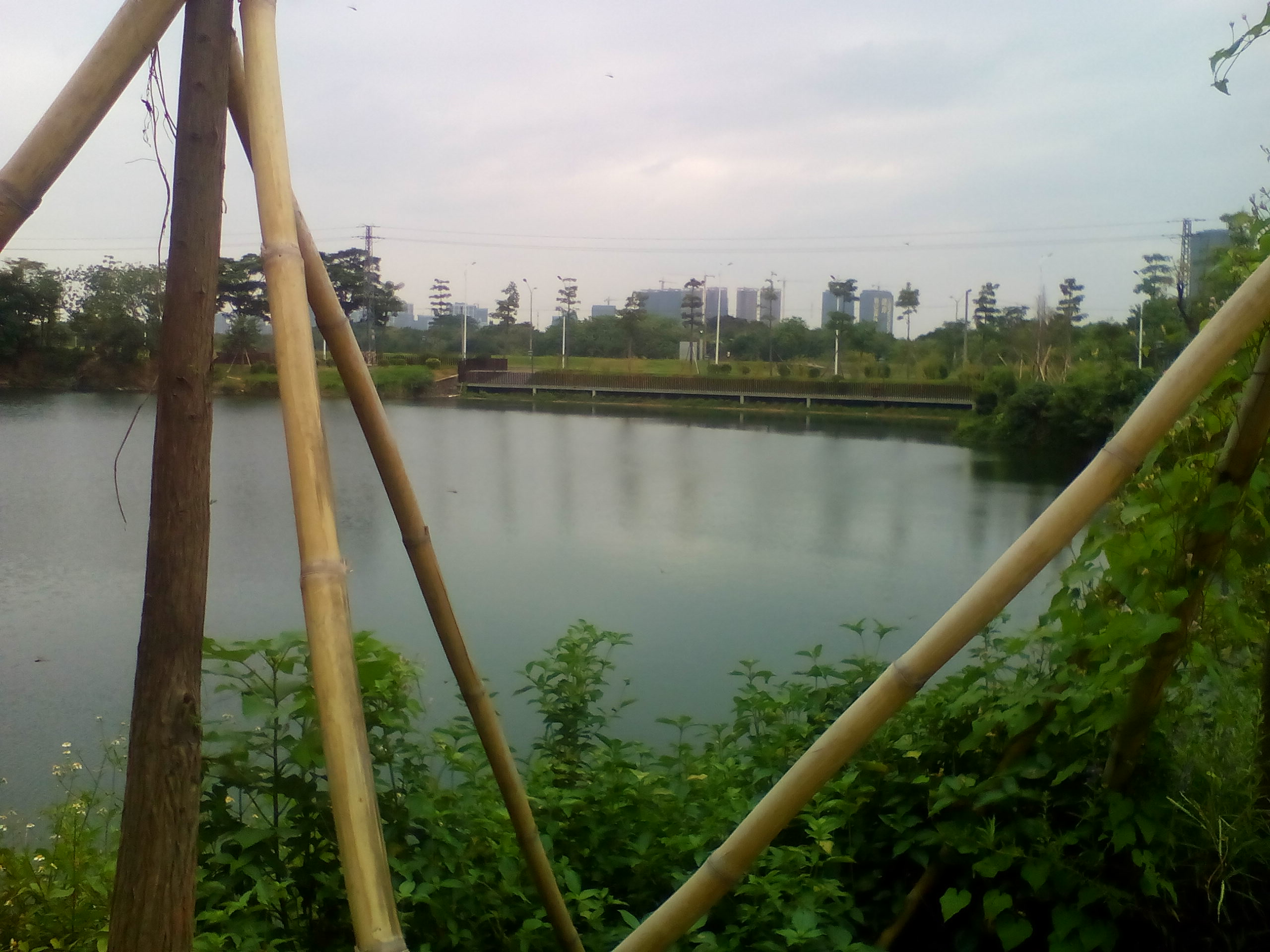
A footway along the central lake

A viewing platform is located in Wangjiegang Park along the waterfront path, and functions as an urban open space.

=== Scientific Activities Area ===
The Scientific Activities Area in Wangjiegang Park is an area for leisure and relaxation, public recreation, and science education.

== Further development ==
A plan for further park development was advanced by XieRichu, a designer in the City Building Department in Foshan at the end of the 20th century. It proposed expanding the developed park area to the nearby ravine and rural areas. The plan also called for an international meeting center, villas, hot springs, skiing area, gymnasium and amusement areas. The ravine was to serve as a water feature and an open public space. Public access to a lighthouse and tidal areas was also envisioned, connecting the park's pond to the Chong and Jiang rivers via a walkway.

Road and infrastructure development inside Wangjiegang Park is largely complete. The Foshan Government and its Building Department are fostering expert discussions regarding the further development of the park, including a long-term development plan.
