= Gaoming Tram =

Suspended tram line in Foshan, China

- TGM1
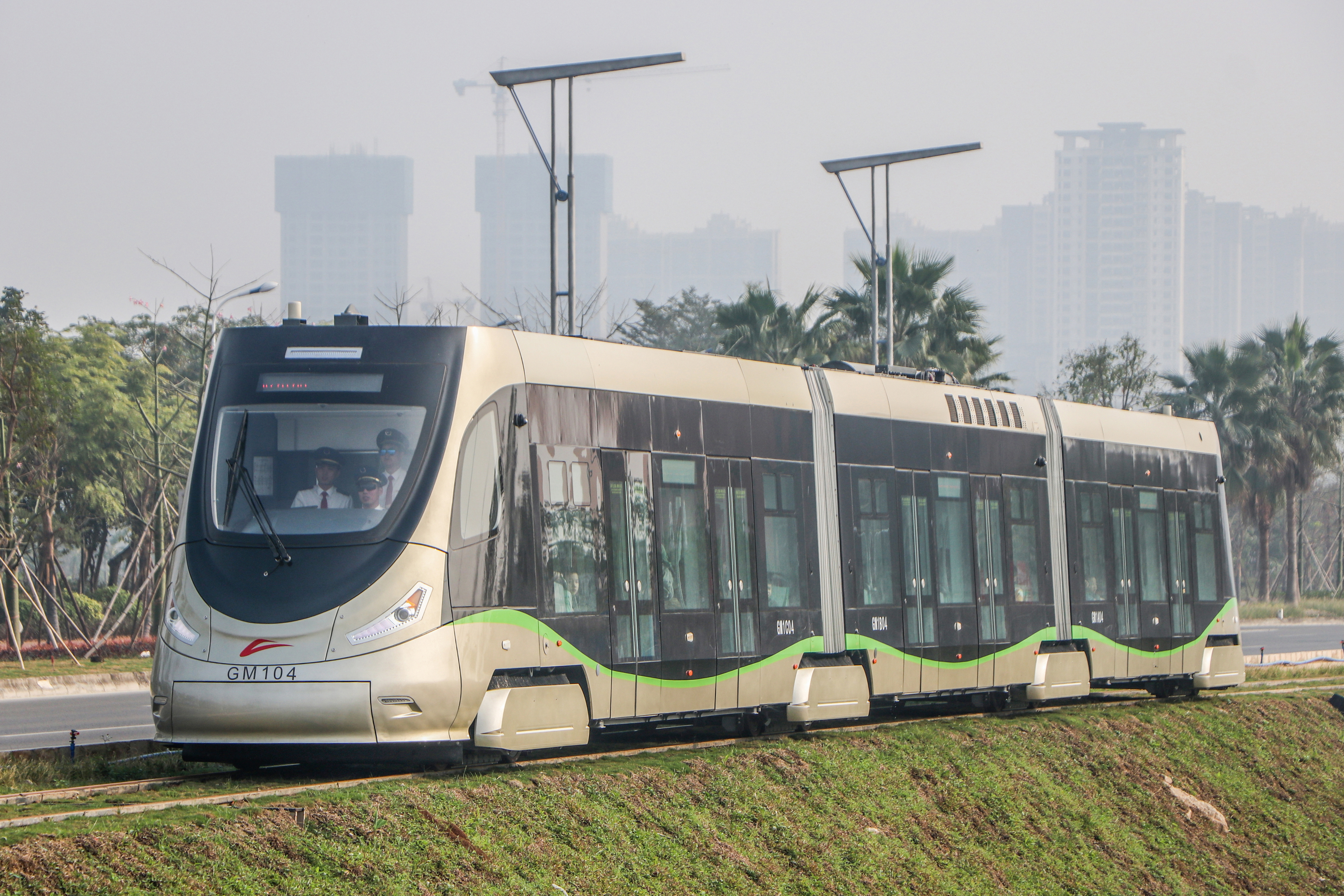

Overview
- Other name: Gaoming Modern Tram Demonstration Line
- Native name: 高明区现代有轨电车示范线
- Status: Suspended operation
- Owner: Foshan Gaoming Modern Rail Transit Construction Investment Co., Ltd
- Locale: Gaoming District, Foshan, Guangdong, China
- Termini: Cangjiang Road; Zhihu
- Stations: 10

Service
- Type: Tram
- System: Foshan Tram
- Services: 1
- Operator(s): Foshan Gaoming Modern Rail Transit Construction Investment Co., Ltd
- Depot(s): Zhihu Depot
- Rolling stock: 5 CRRC Qingdao Sifang 3-car hydrogen fuel cell trams under license from Skoda
- Daily ridership: 578 (2021 average); 1,101 (2020 average)

History
- Opened: 30 December 2019 (Commenced operation); 28 May 2020 (Resume operation)
- Closed: 1 February 2020 (Due to COVID-19 pandemic); 6 August 2024 (Maintenance)

Technical
- Line length: 6.5 km (4.0 mi)
- Number of tracks: 2
- Track gauge: 1,435 mm (4 ft 8 1/2 in)
- Electrification: Hydrogen fuel cell
- Operating speed: 70 km/h (43 mph) (design max)
Route map
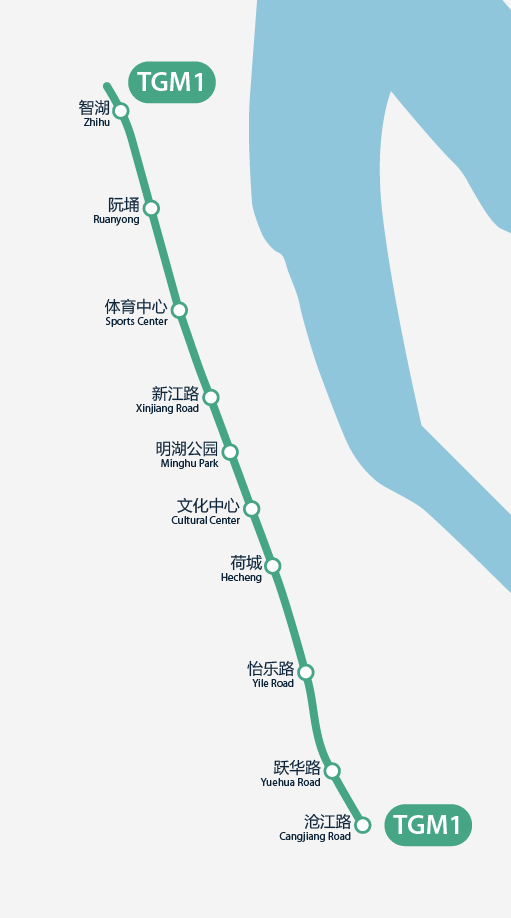

Gaoming Tram (Chinese: 高明区现代有轨电车示范线) also known as Gaoming Modern Tram Demonstration Line, is a tram line serving the Gaoming District of Foshan, operated by Foshan Gaoming Modern Rail Transit Construction Investment Co., Ltd.

== Overview ==
The project is planned to have a total length of 17.4 kilometers and 20 stations. The project operates a 100% low-floor, articulated modern tram powered by hydrogen energy, with a 3-car formation, a spacious interior, 60 seats, and a cab at both ends of the vehicle, which can drive in both directions and reach a maximum speed of 70 kilometers per hour. This is the first tram line in China and also in the world using hydrogen energy.

The total investment of the first phase of the Gaoming tram project is 838 million RMB (118 million USD), while operating costs are 143 million RMB per year. Single journey tickets for the tram cost 2 RMB, while daily passenger numbers fell to just 578 in 2021 from 1,101 the prior year, according to official figures. Based on this, the line's revenue can be estimated to be just 550,000 RMB (77,480 USD) in 2020 and if calculated according to the fare revenue in 2020, it will need to be operated continuously for 1,523 years to recover the investment. According to official data, the annual operating passenger flow of Gaoming trams in 2020 was 275,300, with an average daily passenger flow of 1,101, and in 2021, the average daily passenger flow was 578.

== History ==
On 12 November 2019, Gaoming Tram was officially put into trial operation. On 30 December 2019, it's officially opened for passenger service. Due to COVID-19 pandemic, the line temporarily closed from February 1 to May 27, 2020. The entire line resumed operation on 28 May 2020. However, on 6 August 2024, it's suspended operation again due to maintenance.

== Fares ==
Like any tram lines in China, the line uses fixed independent fare. Single journey costs 2 RMB regardless of the distance, effective from 1 December 2019.

The specific fare and preferential information are as follows:

- The fare for the whole journey is 2 yuan per person each time, and you can enjoy a 9.5% discount on Lingnan Pass, Guangfo Pass and Yangcheng Pass card.
- Children over 1.2 meters tall (including 1.2 meters) must purchase a ticket. Each adult passenger can bring one child under 1.2 meters in height on the bus for free, and more than one person can purchase tickets according to the number of people.
- Free for the elderly in Foshan City aged 65 and above
- For the elderly in Foshan who are over 60 years old and under 65 years old, 50% off the basic fare is applied.
- The first phase is also free of charge for severely disabled people, preferential care recipients enjoying pension subsidies, conscripts, revolutionary disabled soldiers, people's police disabled in the line of duty, and blind people.
- 50% discount on basic fares for people with disabilities in the third and fourth grades.

== Stations ==
All stations located in Gaoming District, Foshan.

Station No.	Station name		Connections	Distance km		Location
Station No.	English	Chinese	Connections	Distance km		Location
TGM104	Cangjiang Road	沧江路		0.00	0.00	Gaoming
TGM105	Yuehua Road	跃华路				Gaoming
TGM106	Yile Road	怡乐路				Gaoming
TGM107	Hecheng	荷城	2 (Planned)			Gaoming
TGM108	Cultural Center	文化中心				Gaoming
TGM109	Minghu Park	明湖公园				Gaoming
TGM110	Xinjiang Road	新江路				Gaoming
TGM111	Sports Center	体育中心				Gaoming
TGM112	Ruanhong	阮埇				Gaoming
TGM113	Zhihu	智湖		6.50		Gaoming
