= Nanzhuang station =

Foshan Metro Line 2 station

Nanzhuang 南庄
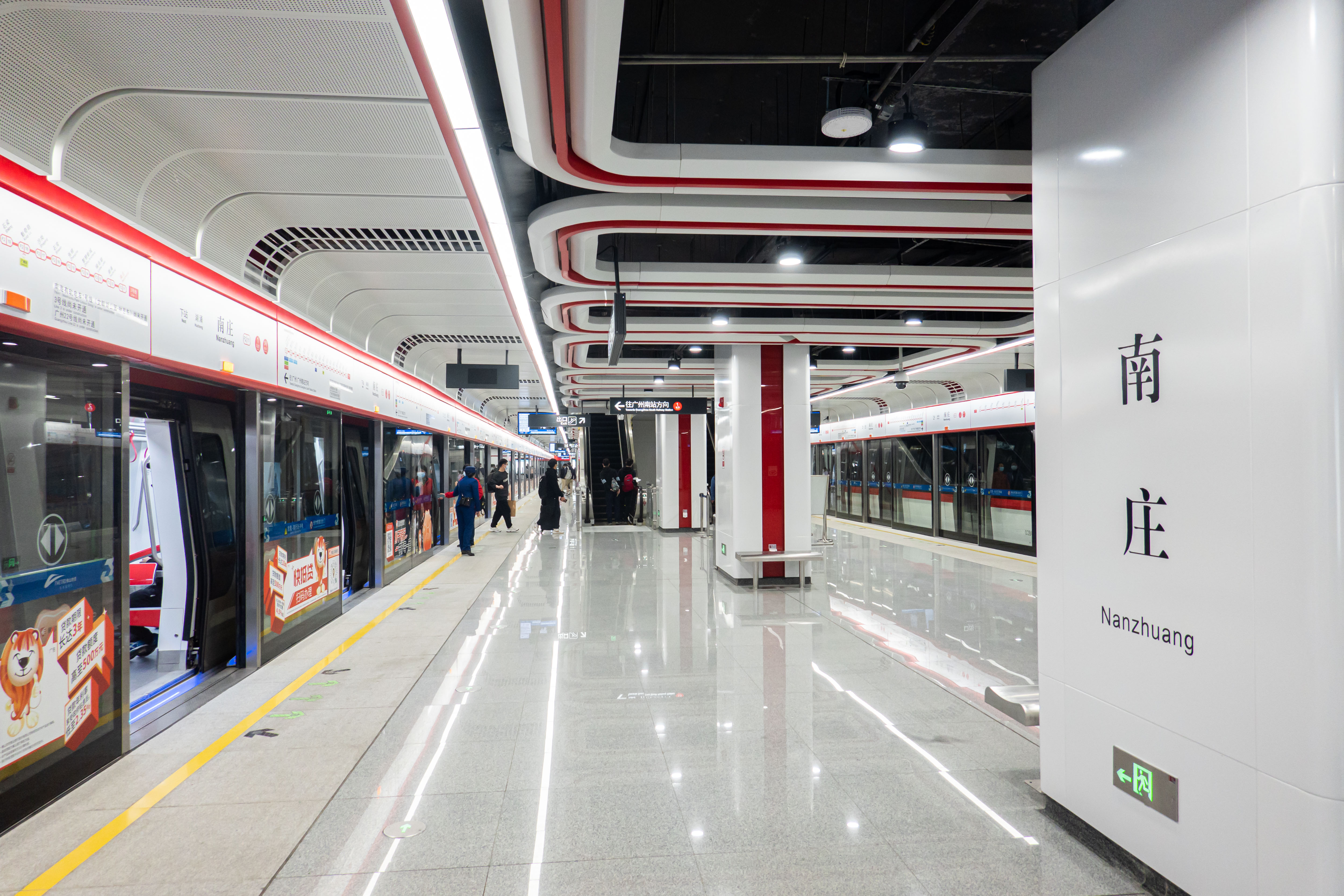
- Platform

Chinese name
- Simplified Chinese: 南庄站
- Traditional Chinese: 南莊站
Transcriptions
Standard Mandarin
- Hanyu Pinyin: Nánzhuāng Zhàn
Yue: Cantonese
- Yale Romanization: Nàahmjōng Jaahm
- Jyutping: Naam^{4}zong^{1} Zaam^{6}

General information
- Location: Intersection of Dengxian Avenue (登贤大道) and Nanzhuang Avenue (南庄大道), Nanzhuang; Chancheng District, Foshan, Guangdong; China
- Coordinates: 22°59′8.45″N 113°0′4.82″E
- Operator: Foshan Metro Operation Co., Ltd.
- Line: Line 2
- Platforms: 2 (1 island platform)
- Tracks: 2

Construction
- Structure type: Underground
- Accessible: Yes

Other information
- Station code: F211

History
- Opened: 28 December 2021 (4 years ago)

Services
Preceding station	Foshan Metro	Following station
Terminus	Line 2	Huchong towards Guangzhou South Railway Station
Location

Nanzhuang station (simplified Chinese: 南庄站; traditional Chinese: 南莊站; pinyin: Nánzhuāng Zhàn; Cantonese Yale: Nàahmjōng Jaahm) is a station on Line 2 of Foshan Metro, located in Foshan's Chancheng District. It opened on 28 December 2021, and is the western terminus of the line. It is also the westernmost station on the Foshan Metro.

== Station layout ==
The station has an island platform under Dengxian Boulevard.

G	-	Exits A-D
L1; Concourse	Lobby	Ticket Machines, Customer Service, Shops, Police Station, Security Facilities
L2; Platforms	Platform 2	2 towards Guangzhou South Railway Station (Huchong)
L2; Platforms	Island platform, doors will open on the left or right
L2; Platforms	Platform 1	2 towards Guangzhou South Railway Station (Huchong)

=== Entrances/exits ===
The station has 4 points of entry/exit, of which Exit A was not opened at the initial stage of opening, and instead it opened on 1 March 2023. Exit C is equipped with an elevator.

- A: Nanzhuang Avenue
- B: Dengxian Avenue
- C: Dengxian Avenue
- D: Nanzhuang Avenue
