= Guangzhou South railway station =

Railway and metro interchange station in Guangzhou

Guangzhounan 广州南
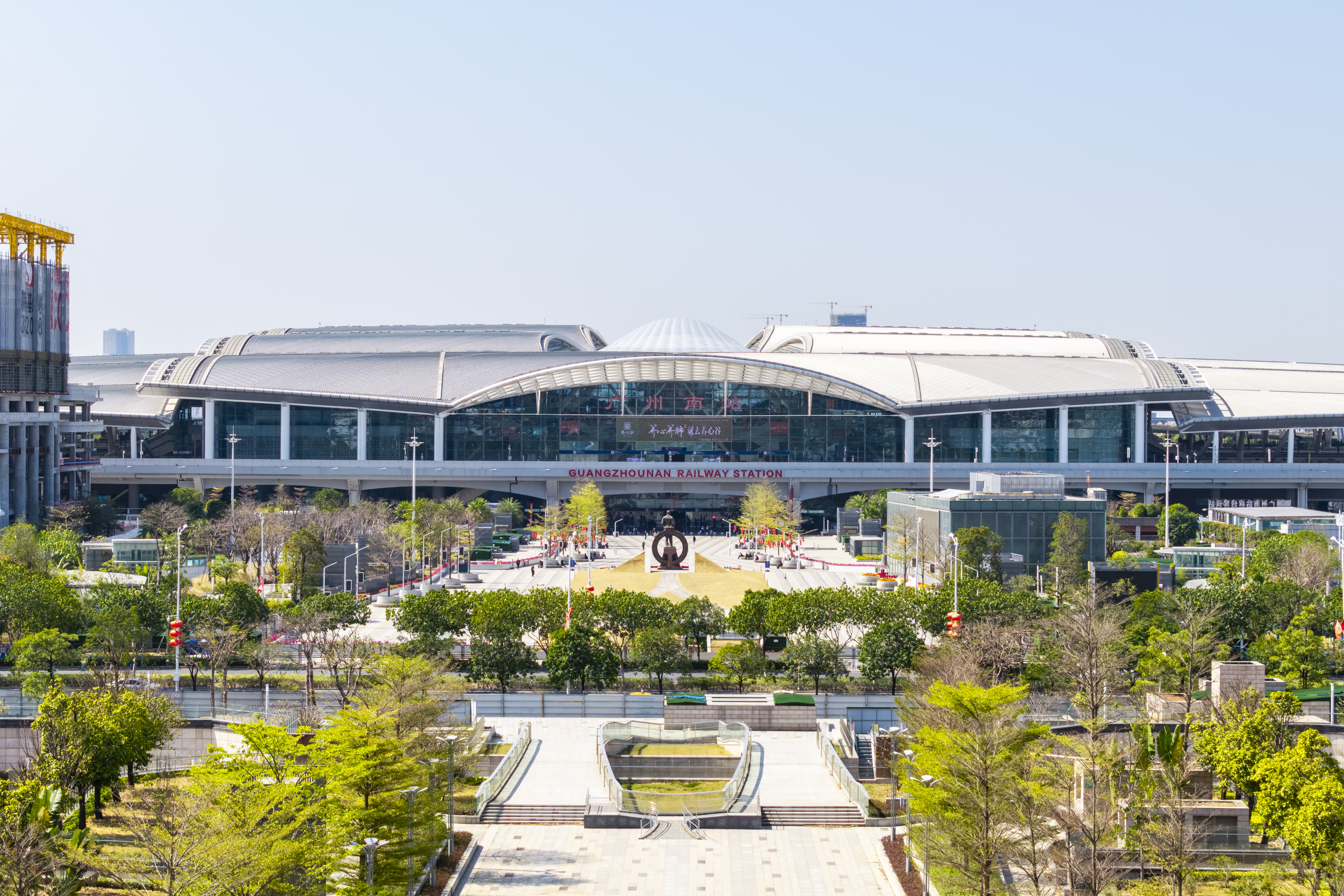
- The east square of Guangzhounan

Chinese name
- Simplified Chinese: 广州南站
- Traditional Chinese: 廣州南站
- Postal: Canton South station
Transcriptions
Standard Mandarin
- Hanyu Pinyin: Gǔangzhōunán Zhàn
Yue: Cantonese
- Jyutping: gwong^{2}zau^{1}naam^{4} zaam^{6}

General information
- Other names: Guangzhou South
- Location: 133 Nanzhan Road, Panyu District, Guangzhou, Guangdong; China
- Coordinates: 22°59′15″N 113°16′07″E
- Operator: China Railway Guangzhou Group
- Lines: CRH: Guangzhou-Shenzhen-Hong Kong Express Rail Link; Beijing–Guangzhou high-speed railway; Guiyang–Guangzhou high-speed railway; Nanning–Guangzhou high-speed railway; Guangzhou-Zhuhai intercity railway; Guangzhou Metro: Line 2; Line 7; Line 22; Foshan Metro: Line 2
- Platforms: CRH: 13 island platforms and 2 side platforms; Metro: 8 platforms (3 island platforms and 2 side platforms)
- Tracks: CRH: 28; Metro: 8
- Connections: Panyu; Metro station; Bus terminal

Construction
- Structure type: Elevated (China Railway); Underground (Guangzhou Metro & Foshan Metro)

Other information
- Station code: CRH: TMIS code: 65848; Telegraph code: IZQ; Pinyin code: GZN; Metro: 201; 701; 2203; F227
- Classification: Top Class station

History
- Opened: 30 January 2010; 16 years ago (China Railway); 25 September 2010; 16 years ago (Guangzhou Metro line 2); 28 December 2017; 8 years ago (Guangzhou Metro line 7); 28 December 2021; 4 years ago (Foshan Metro line 2); 31 March 2022; 4 years ago (Guangzhou Metro line 22)
- Former names: New Guangzhou railway station (新广州站), Shibi railway station (石壁站)
Location

New Guangzhou railway station
- Simplified Chinese: 新广州站
- Traditional Chinese: 新廣州站
Transcriptions
Standard Mandarin
- Hanyu Pinyin: Xīn Guǎngzhōu Zhàn
Yue: Cantonese
- Jyutping: san1 gwong2zau1 zaam6

Shibi railway station
- Chinese: 石壁站
Transcriptions
Standard Mandarin
- Hanyu Pinyin: Shíbì Zhàn
Yue: Cantonese
- Jyutping: sek6bik1 zaam6

Guangzhounan (Guangzhou South) railway station (simplified Chinese: 广州南站; traditional Chinese: 廣州南站; Jyutping: gwong2 zau1 naam4 zaam6; Cantonese Yale: Gwóngjāu Nàahm Jaahm) is located in Shibi, Panyu District, Guangzhou, Guangdong Province, China. It is a large modern rail terminal 17 kilometres (11 mi) south of central Guangzhou. For a brief time it was Asia's largest railway station by area when it officially started operation in early 2010.. It's also the world's largest railway station by total area criteria.

The station, designed by TFP Farrells, remains the largest in Guangzhou. It is one of the four largest railway passenger transportation hubs in China. It is an interchange station and a terminus between the Guangzhou-Shenzhen-Hong Kong XRL, Guangzhou-Maoming Railway, Guangzhou–Zhuhai intercity railway and Beijing-Guangzhou HSR. This station is intended to replace the existing Guangzhou railway station as the dominant station in Guangzhou. Together with Guangzhou railway station, Guangzhou East and Guangzhou North railway stations, the station will jointly form one of six planned National Railway Passenger Transportation Centres by the Chinese Ministry of Railways.

On 1 October 2026, the station served a total of 1.049 million passengers, making it the first railway station in the world to surpass a million passenger in a single day. During peak hours, the shortest train headway here was only 40 seconds.

== History ==
- 30 December 2004 – Construction commences
- 30 January 2010 – Partial opening of the station with services north to Wuhan
- 25 September 2010 – Metro station opened
- 7 January 2011 – Services to Zhuhai North and Xinhui commences
- 26 December 2011 – Service to Shenzhen North commences
- 26 December 2012 – Service to Beijing West commences
- 26 December 2014 – Services to Nanning East and Guiyang North commences
- 30 December 2015 – Services to Futian commences
- 23 September 2018 – Service to Hong Kong West Kowloon commences

== Interchanges ==
Guangzhou South railway station is also a comprehensive transportation hub; passengers can interchange between high-speed long-distance trains, Metro, long-distance and local buses, taxi, etc. Guangzhou Metro Line 2, Line 7, Line 22 and Foshan Metro Line 2 are located at or near the bottom of station complex. The formation of a centralized transfer center will see connections with the future Guangzhou Metro Line 20.

Panyu railway station operated by Guangdong Intercity starts operation since 26 May 2024, while for transferring between Guangzhou South Railway Station and Panyu railway station, no internal transfer walkway was available meaning that an external transfer, involving "exit-and-enter" at two different gates, together with a security check conducted in-between, is required.

== Adjacent stations ==
Preceding station	China Railway High-speed	Following station
Guangzhou North towards Wuhan	Wuhan–Guangzhou high-speed railway	Terminus
Terminus	Guangzhou–Shenzhen–Hong Kong XRL	Qingsheng towards Hong Kong West Kowloon
Foshan West towards Nanning	Nanning–Guangzhou high-speed railway	Terminus
Foshan West towards Guiyang North	Guiyang–Guangzhou high-speed railway	Terminus
Terminus	Guangzhou–Zhuhai intercity railway	Bijiang towards Zhuhai
Preceding station	Guangzhou Metro	Following station
Terminus	Line 2	Shibi towards Jiahewanggang
Dazhou towards Meidi Dadao	Line 7	Shibi towards Yanshan
Chentougang towards Fangcun	Line 22	Shiguanglu towards Panyu Square
Preceding station	Foshan Metro	Following station
Linyue Dong towards Nanzhuang	Line 2	Terminus

== Gallery (Metro) ==
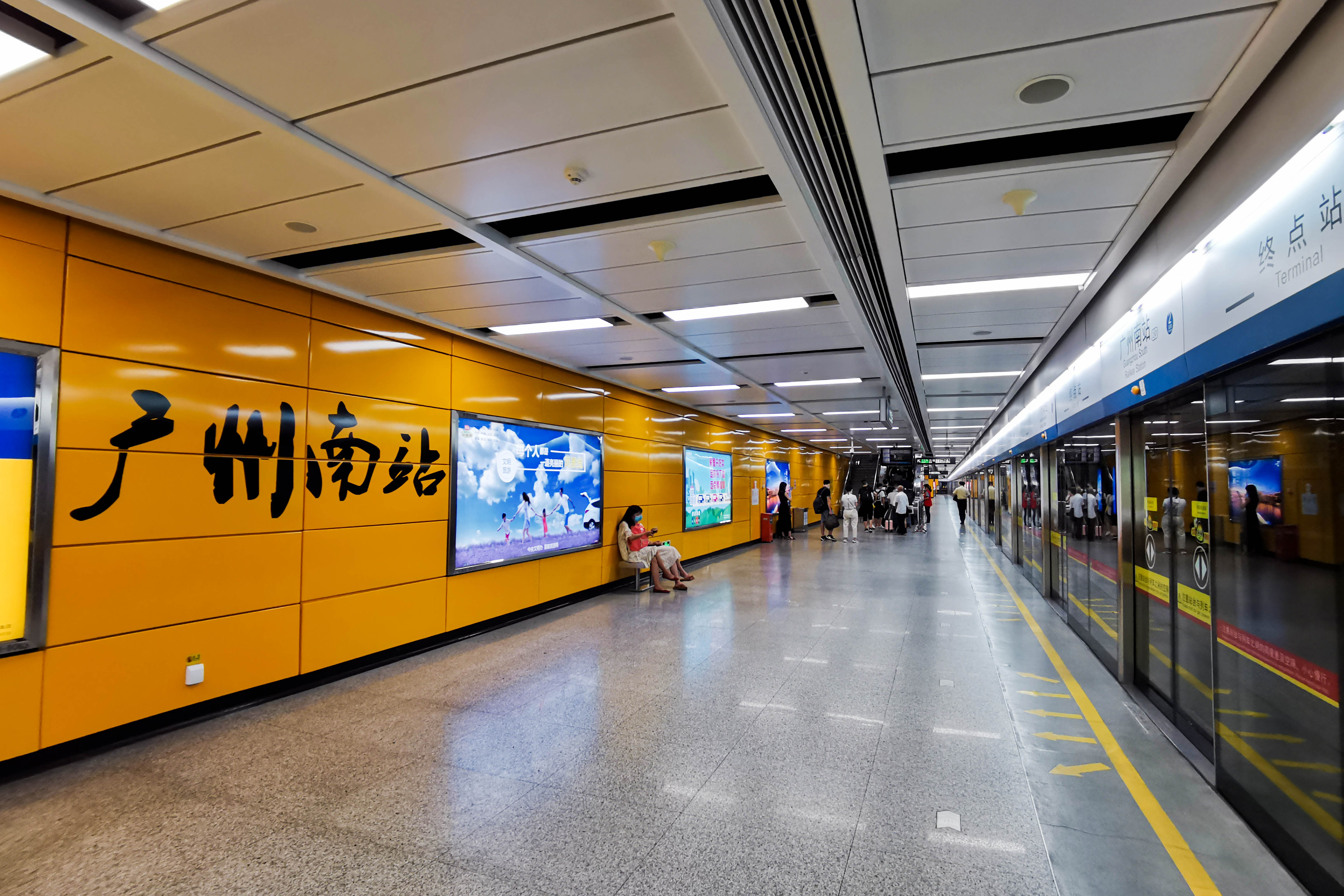
Line 2 termination platform

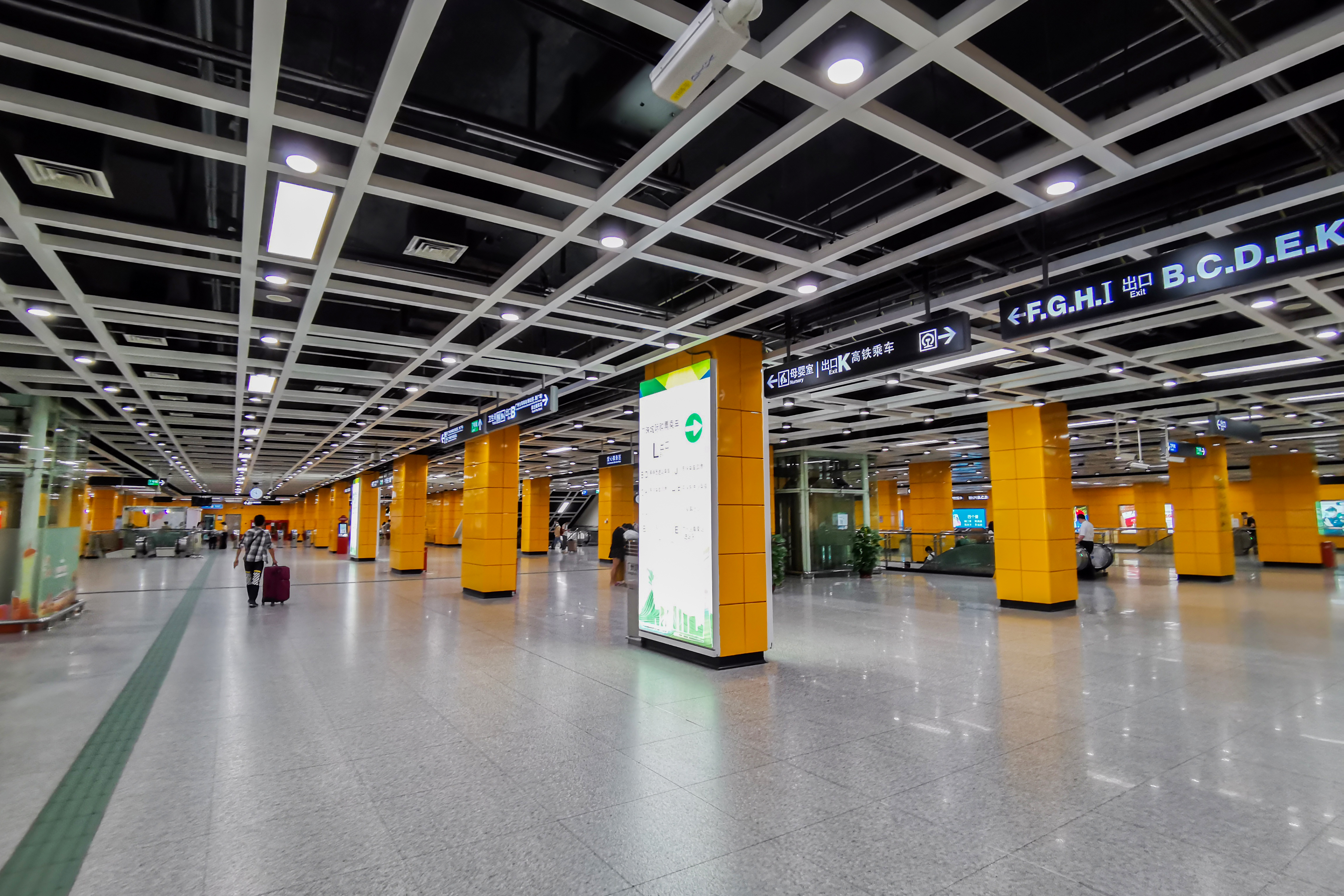
Lines 2 & 7 concourse

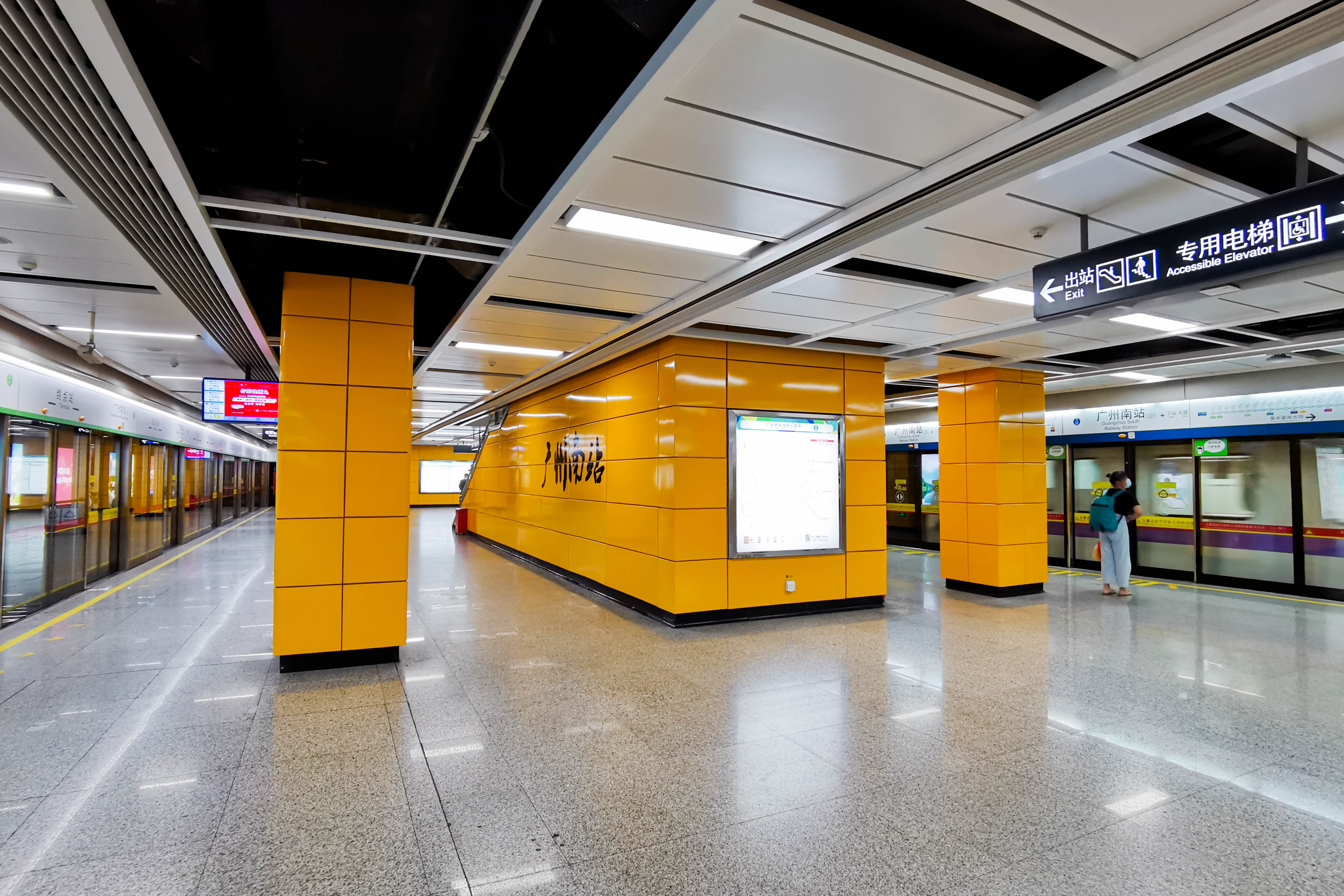
Line 2 northbound and Line 7 southbound platform

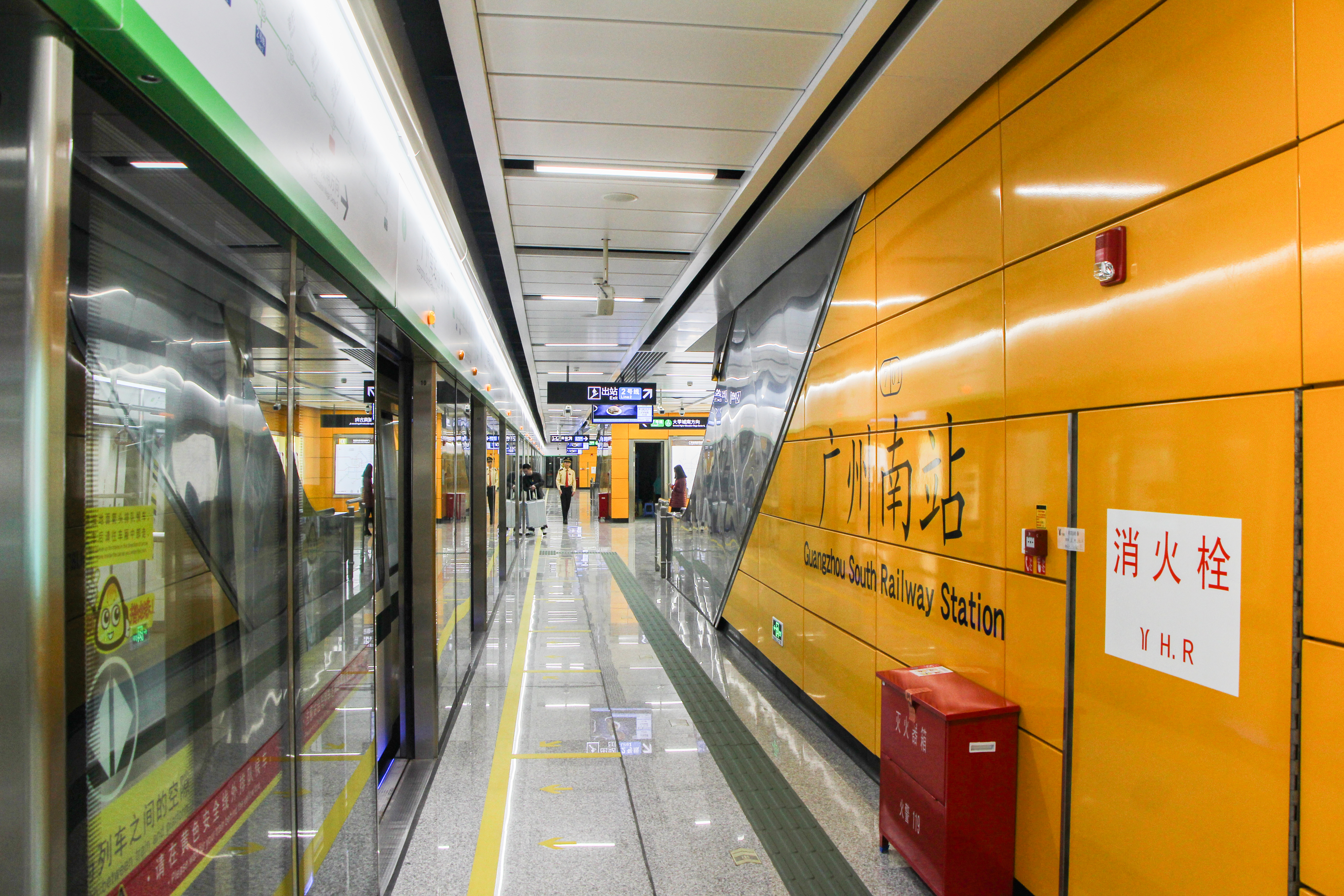
Line 7 northbound platform

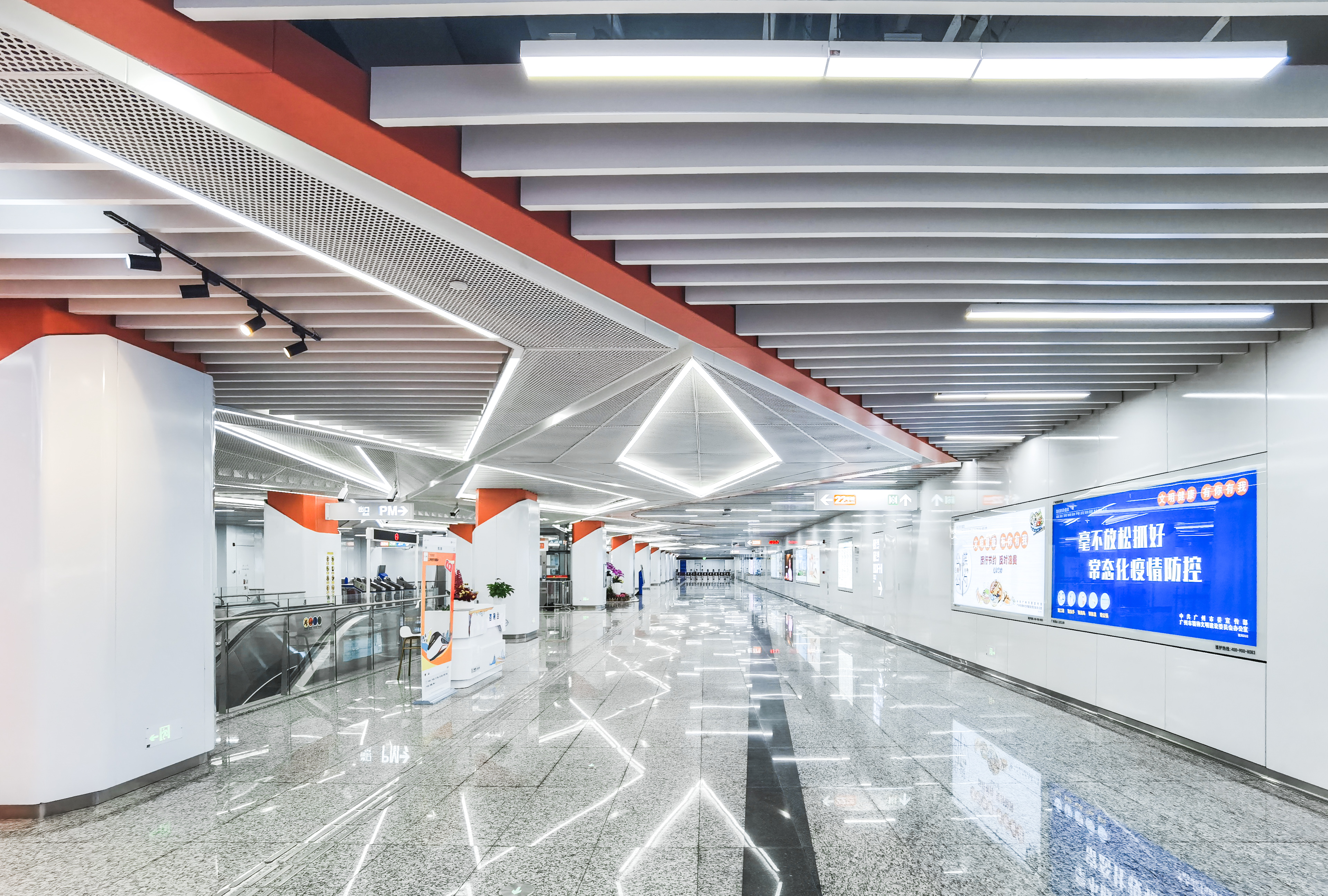
Line 22 concourse

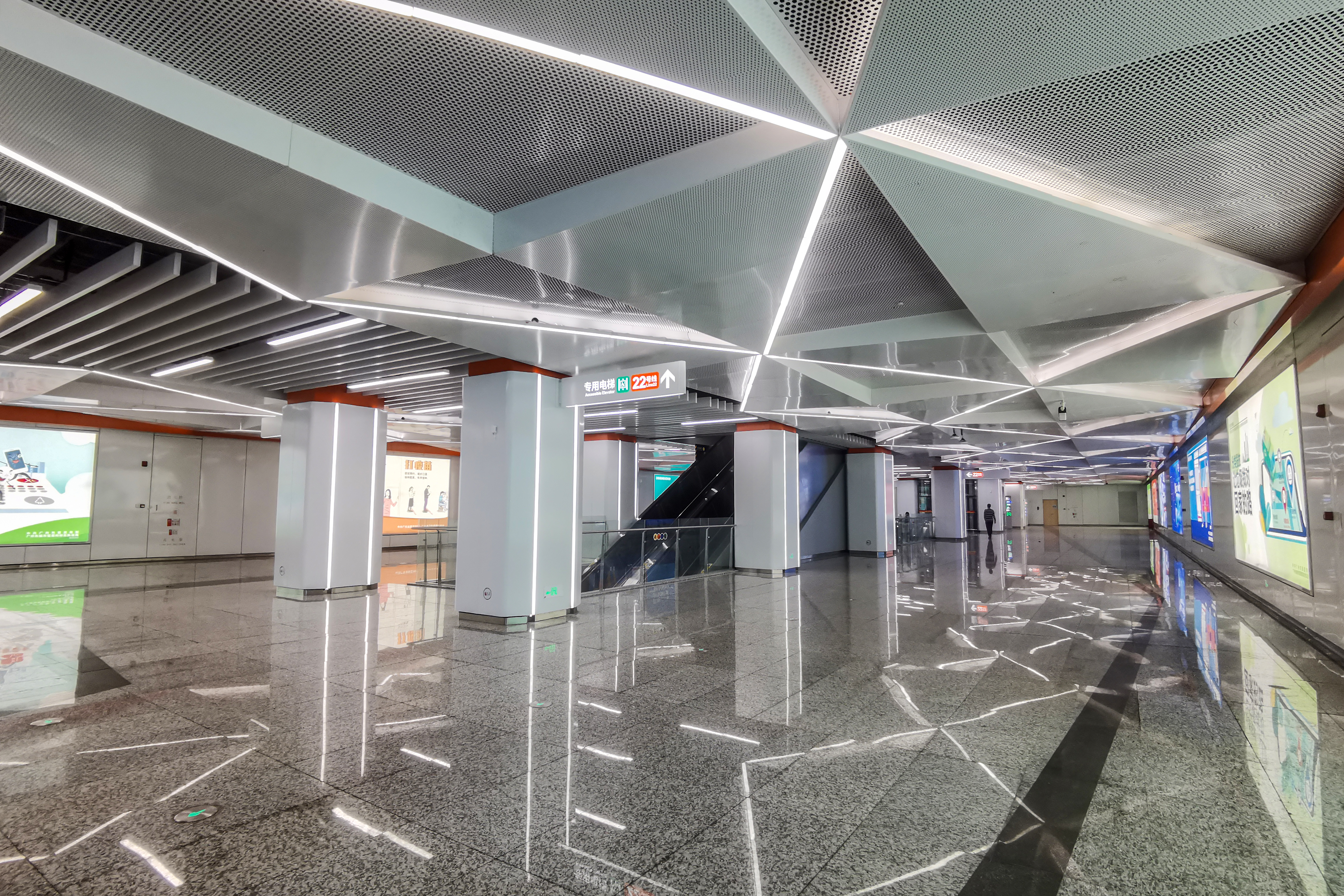
Line 22 mezzanine

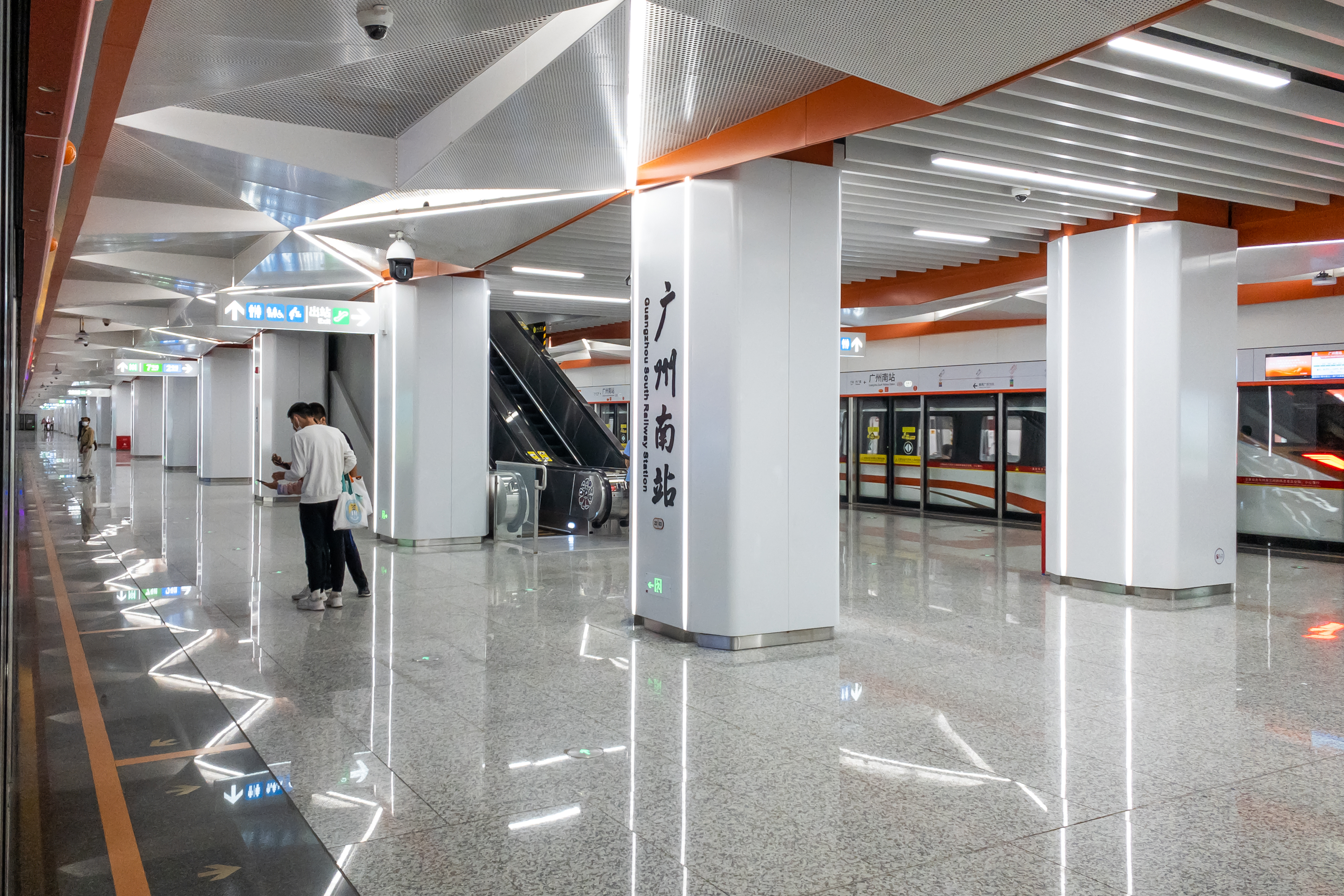
Line 22 platform

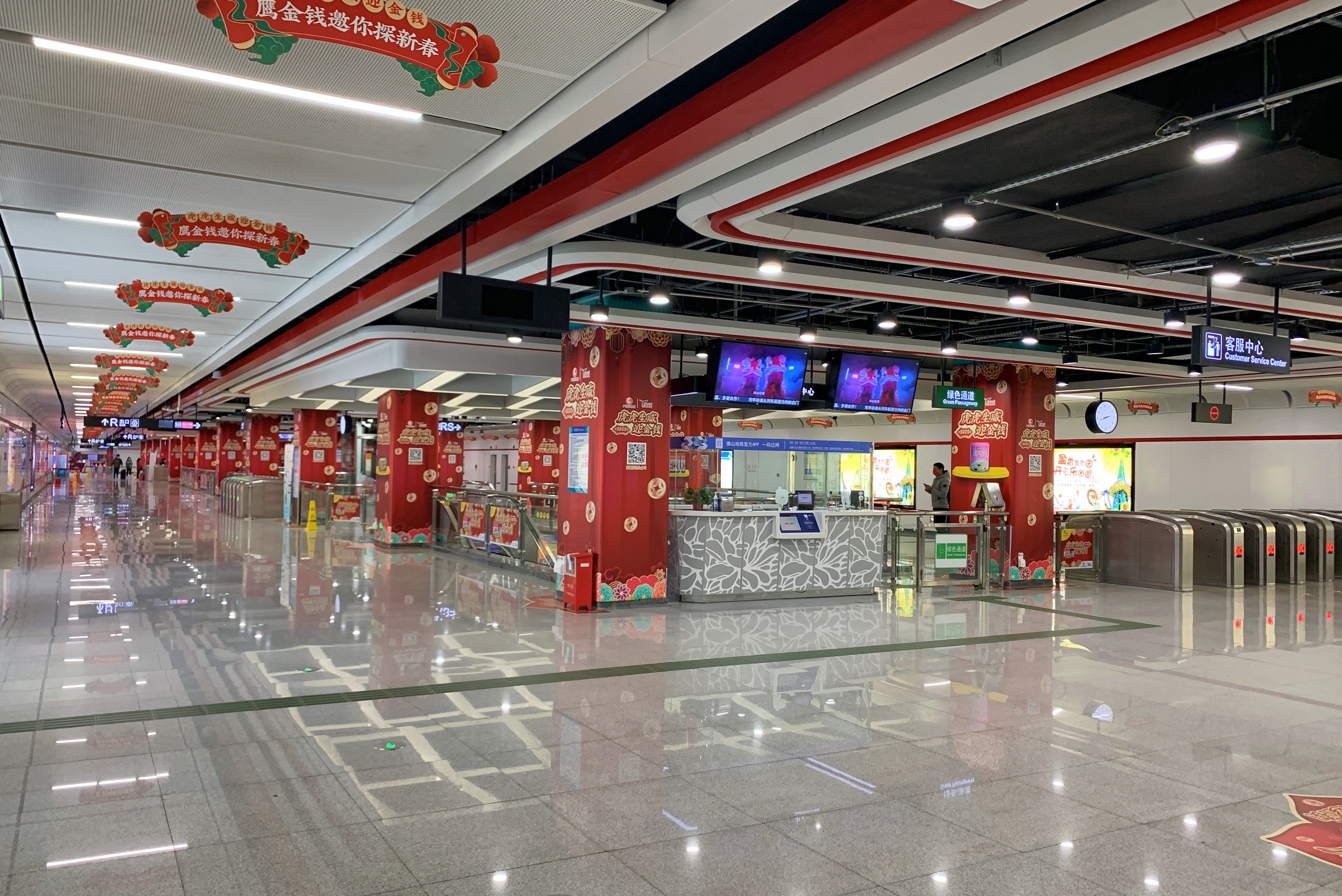
Foshan Line 2 concourse

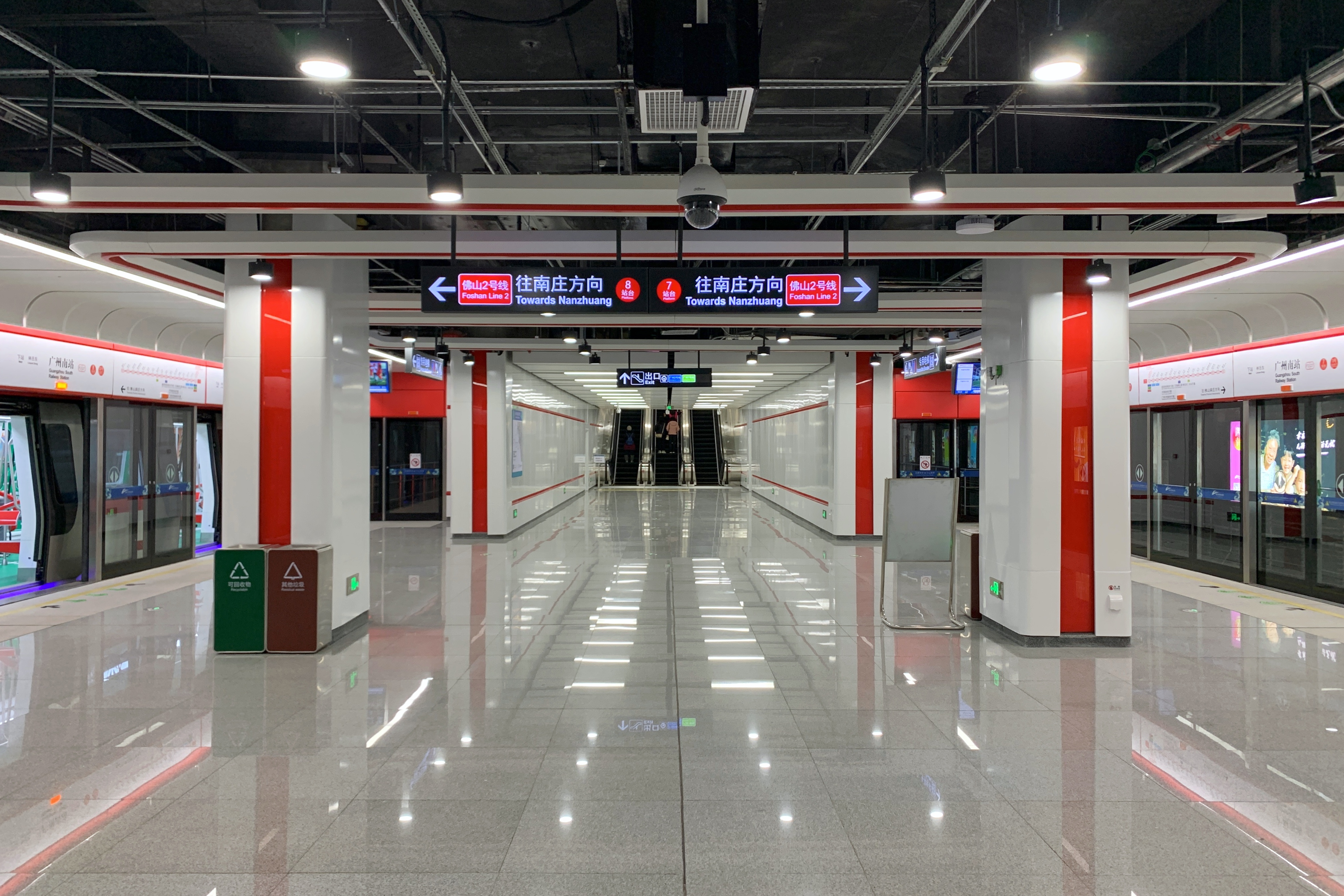
Foshan Line 2 platform

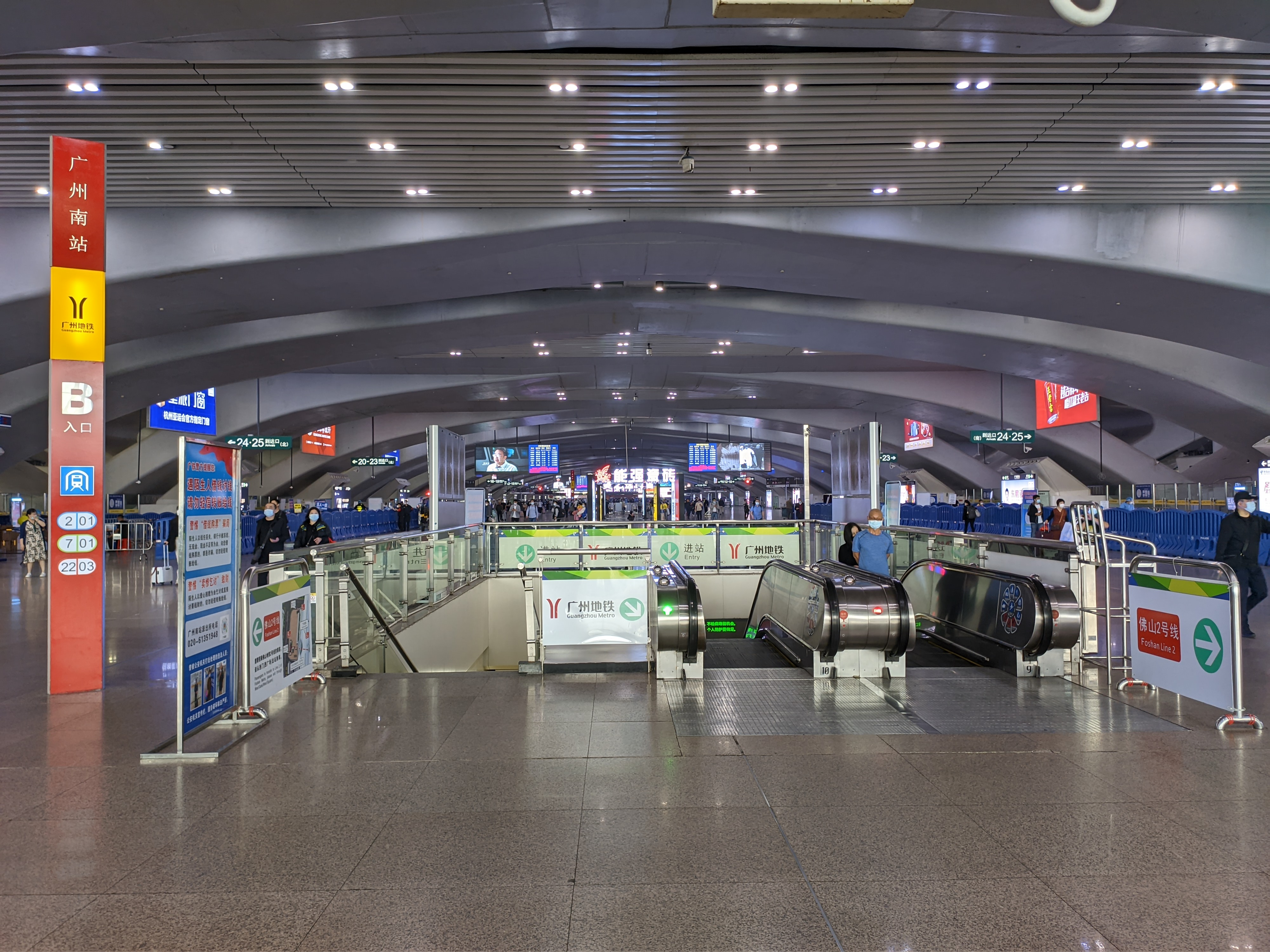
Exit B

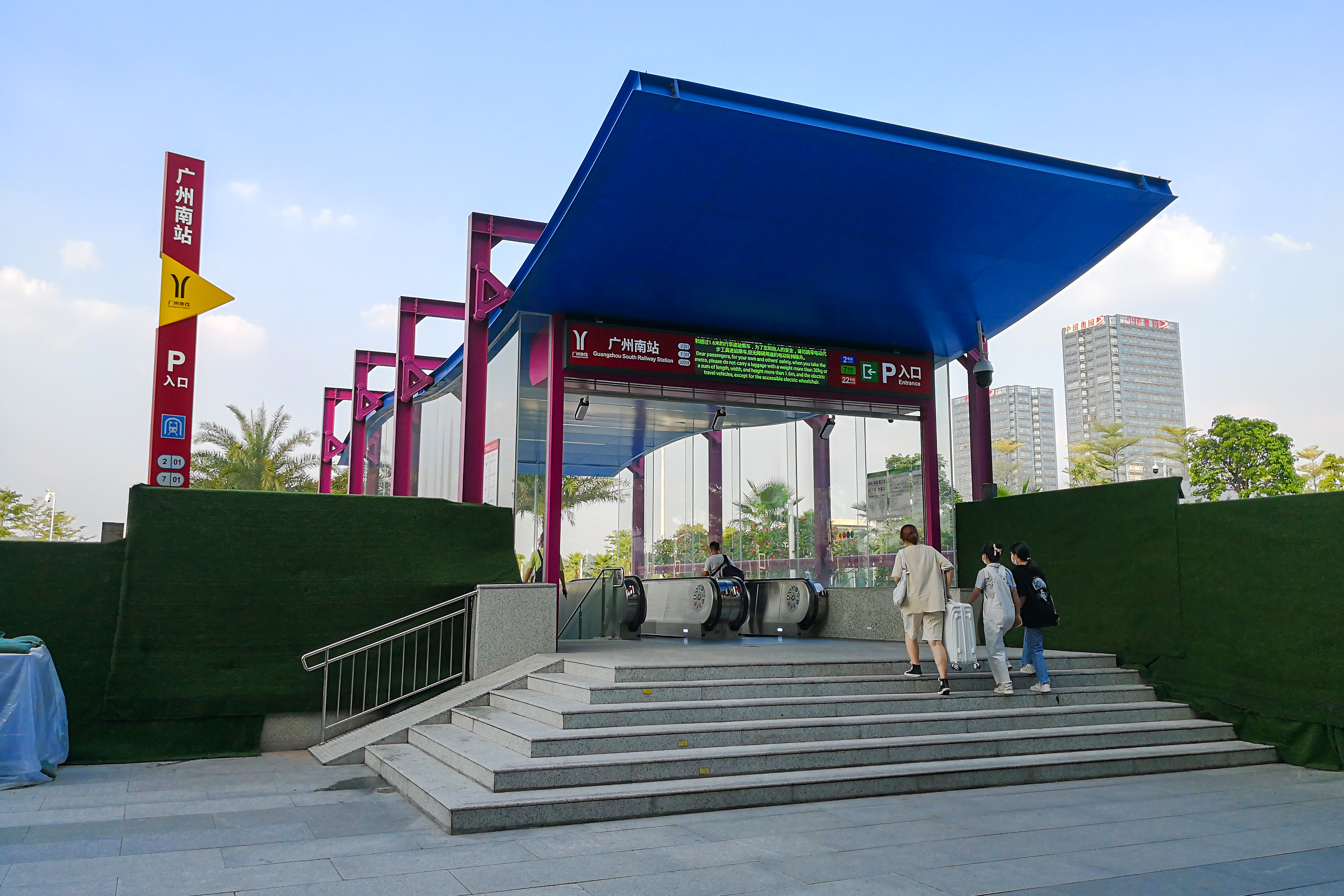
Exit P

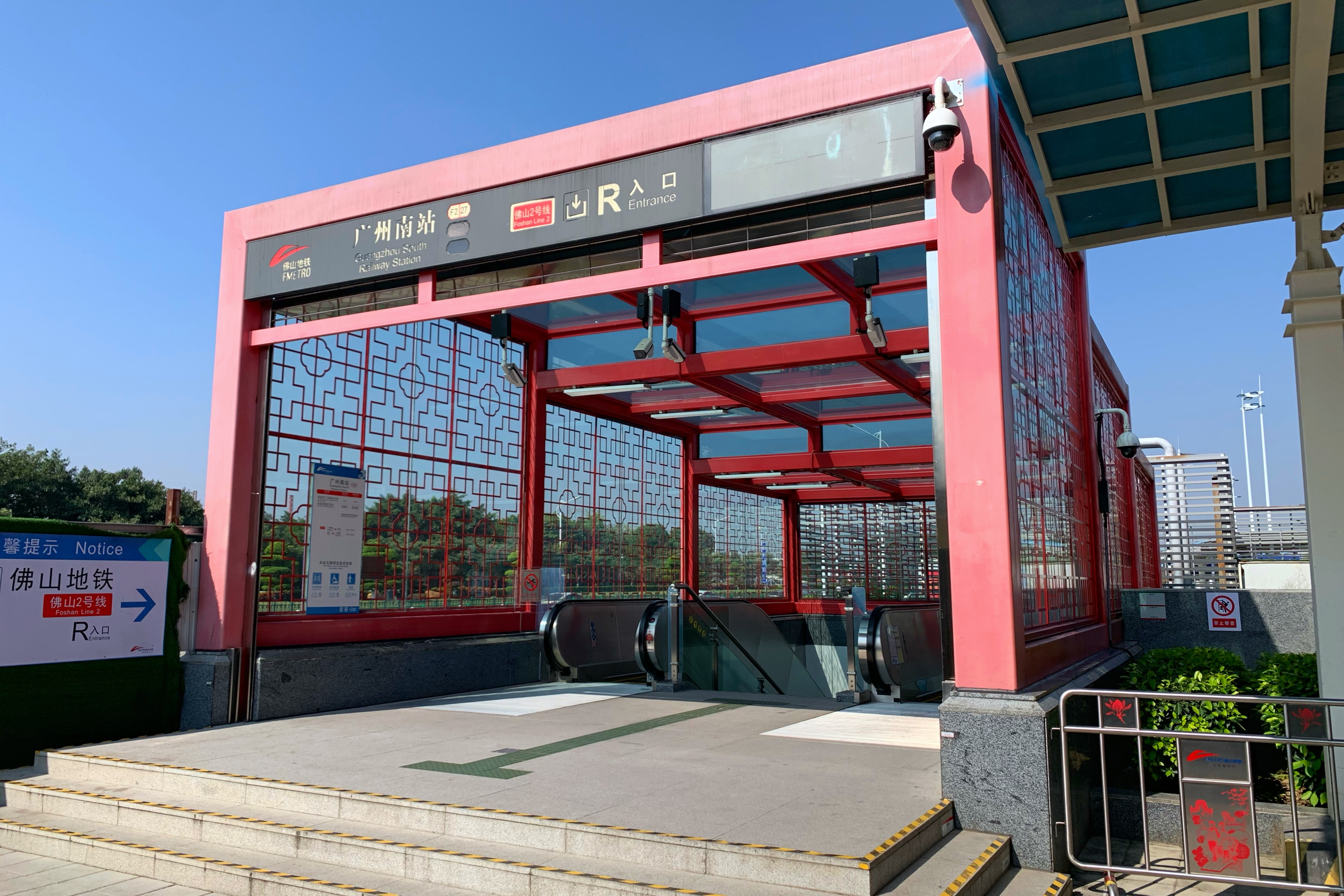
Exit R

== See also ==
- Guangzhou–Shenzhen–Hong Kong Express Rail Link
