= Chancheng, Foshan =

Chancheng 禅城区
- District
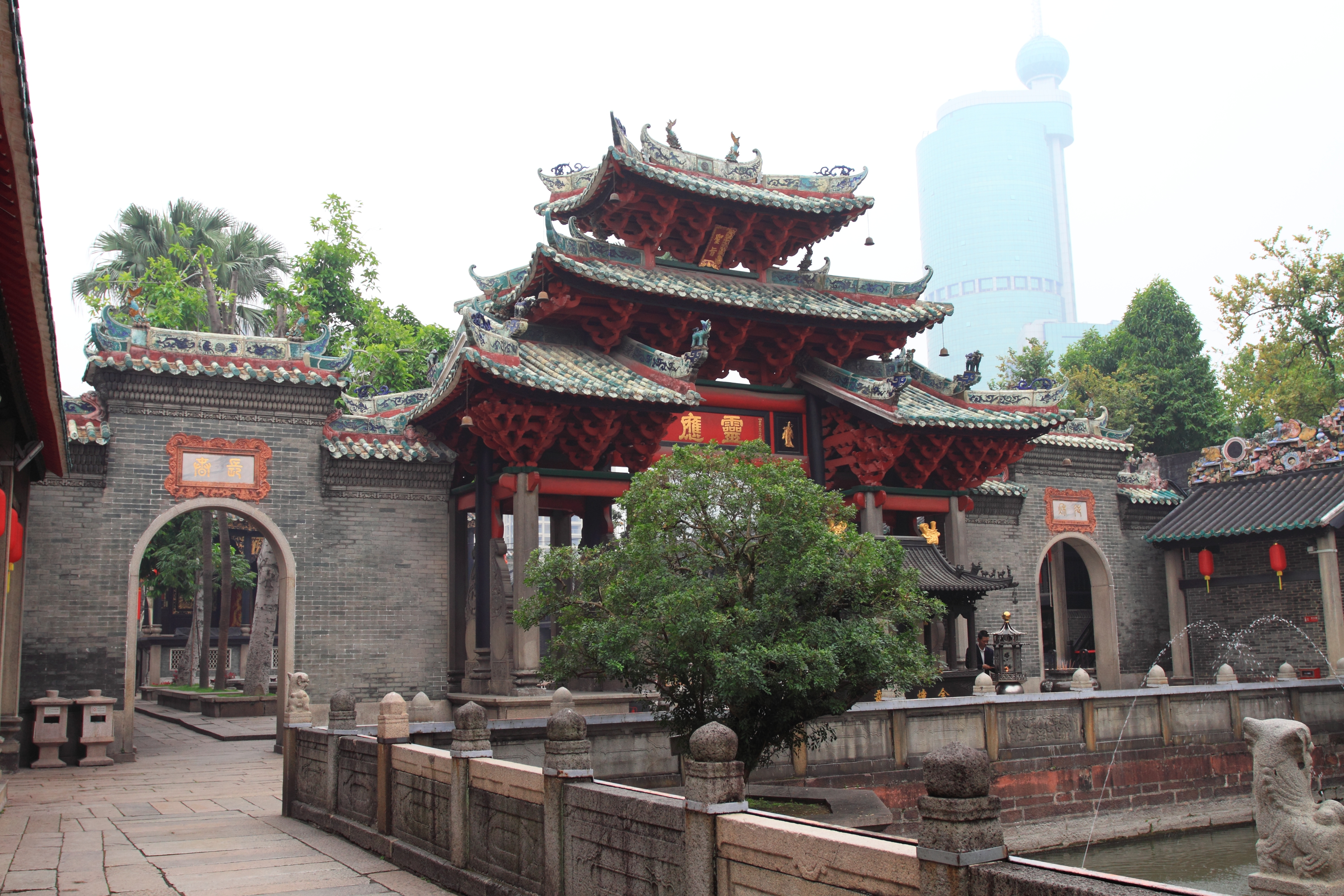
- Foshan Ancestral Temple in Chancheng
- Interactive map of Chancheng
- Coordinates (Foshan government): 23°01′17″N 113°07′18″E
- Country: People's Republic of China
- Province: Guangdong
- Prefecture-level city: Foshan

Area
  - Total: 153.69 km^{2} (59.34 sq mi)

Population (2020)
  - Total: 1,330,262
  - Density: 8,655.5/km^{2} (22,418/sq mi)
- Time zone: UTC+8 (China Standard)
- Postal code: 528000
- Website: Chancheng.gov.cn

Chancheng, Foshan
- Simplified Chinese: 禅城区
- Traditional Chinese: 禪城區
- Jyutping: sim4 sing4 keoi1
- Cantonese Yale: Sìhmsìhng Kēui
- Hanyu Pinyin: Chánchéng Qū
Transcriptions
Standard Mandarin
- Hanyu Pinyin: Chánchéng Qū
Yue: Cantonese
- Yale Romanization: Sìhmsìhng Kēui
- Jyutping: sim4 sing4 keoi1

Alternative Chinese name
- Simplified Chinese: 禅城
- Traditional Chinese: 禪城
- Jyutping: sim4 sing4
- Cantonese Yale: Sìhmsìhng
- Hanyu Pinyin: Chánchéng
Transcriptions
Standard Mandarin
- Hanyu Pinyin: Chánchéng
Yue: Cantonese
- Yale Romanization: Sìhmsìhng
- Jyutping: sim4 sing4

Chancheng District is a district and the seat of the city of Foshan, Guangdong Province, China. Chancheng is the economic, cultural and political center of the city.

== History ==
Chancheng belonged to the land of Baiyue during the Spring and Autumn and Warring States period, Panyu County from the Qin Dynasty to the North and South dynasties, Nanhai County from the Sui dynasty in 590 to the Tang dynasty, Xianning County during the Five Dynasties and Ten Kingdoms period in 917, and Nanhai County from the Song dynasty in 972 to the Qing dynasty.

== Geography ==
The district lies at the center of Foshan, surrounded on the east, west, and north sides by Nanhai District and bordered to the south by Shunde District. Chancheng District is located in the hinterland of the Pearl River Delta, southwest of Guangzhou and central Foshan, bordering Nanhai District to the east, west and north, and Shunde District to the southeast and south, with a length of 15 km from north to south and a width of 19 km from east to west. Chancheng District is flat alluvial plain, the vast majority of which is 1.3 to 4.6 meters above sea level, with scattered small hills at an elevation of less than 1,750 meters. The landform is composed of sub-sand and silt layers, the top layer of the Pearl River Delta deposits. Most of the surface is covered by loose sediments, which are about 15 to 25 meters thick. The geology is mainly clay and other sand layers of varying grain size. The mineral resources are mainly non-metallic minerals, among which gypsum is widely distributed.

Chancheng District has an average temperature of 23.6 °C (74.48 °F). Chancheng District is located in the lower reaches of the Bei River, with a total precipitation of 1599.8 mm, a total water resource of 191 million tons, a total water supply of 186 million tons, and a total water consumption of 173 million tons.

Wangjiegang Park is located on a volcanic hill in the area.

== Economy ==
In 2020, the gross regional product of Chancheng District will be ¥191.179 billion (US$30.22 billion). The value of the secondary sector was ¥67.096 billion (US$10.61 billion) and the added value of the tertiary sector was ¥124.032 billion (US$19.61 billion). The per capita disposable income of the region's residents is ¥55,141 (US$8,716). Tourist attractions in Chancheng District include the Foshan Ancestral Temple and the Nanfeng Kiln. In 2020, Chancheng District received a total of 7,470,900 tourist arrivals, including 19,800 international tourists and 3,301,200 domestic tourists, with a total annual tourism revenue of ¥6.451 billion (US$1.02 billion).

== Population ==
In 2020, Chancheng District will have a registered population of 724,400, a total of 236,400 households, and a registered foreign population of 659,400, with a male to female gender ratio of 95.5:100.

In 2020, Chancheng District has 262 schools of various types, including 2 secondary vocational education, 11 general high schools, 16 general middle schools, 75 elementary schools, 155 kindergartens, and 3 special education. There are 194,000 students in school and 17,700 teaching staff, including 12,500 full-time teachers.

== Administration divisions ==
When Chancheng District was established on January 8, 2003, it had five towns and eight subdistricts under its jurisdiction. On September 19, they were changed to one town and eight subdistricts. On June 29, 2006, they were changed to one town and three subdistricts.

Name	Chinese (S)	Hanyu Pinyin	Population (2010)	Area (km^{2})
Zumiao Subdistrict	祖庙街道	Zǔmiào Jiēdào	416,800	31.60
Shiwanzhen Subdistrict	石湾镇街道	Shíwānzhèn Jiēdào	286,226	26.62
Zhangcha Subdistrict (Foshan High-tech Industry Development Zone)	张槎街道	Zhāngchá Jiēdào	241,149	26.50
Nanzhuang town	南庄镇	Nánzhuāng Zhèn	156,902	76.70
