= Shagang station =

Foshan Metro Line 2 station

Shagang 沙岗
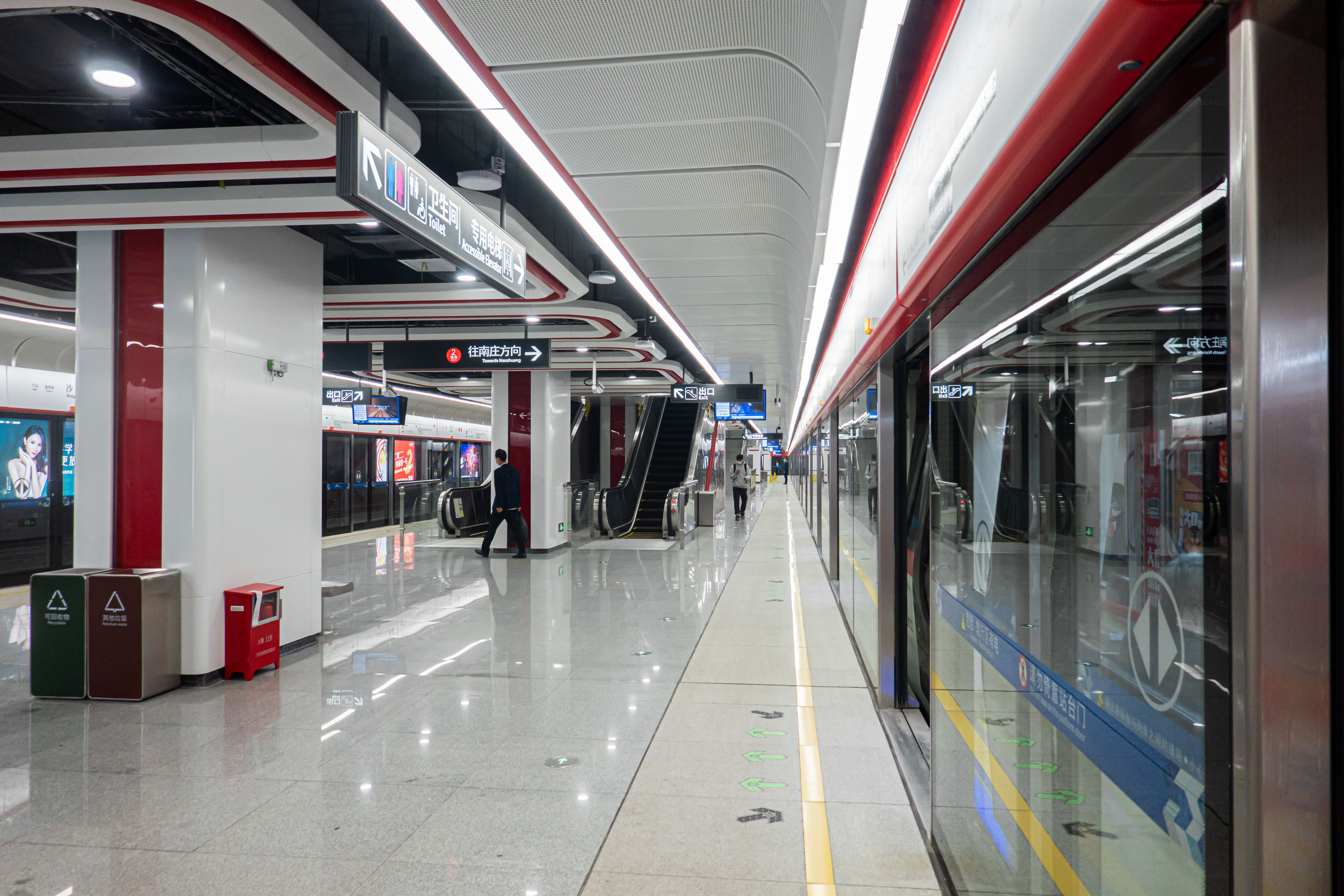
- Platform

Chinese name
- Simplified Chinese: 沙岗站
- Traditional Chinese: 沙崗站
Transcriptions
Standard Mandarin
- Hanyu Pinyin: Shāgǎng Zhàn
Yue: Cantonese
- Yale Romanization: Sāagōng Jaahm
- Jyutping: Saa^{1}gong^{1} Zaam^{6}

General information
- Location: Fork of West Kuiqi Road (魁奇西路), Wugang Road (雾岗路) and Xingang Road (新岗路), Shiwanzhen Subdistrict; Chancheng District, Foshan, Guangdong; China
- Coordinates: 22°59′56.80″N 113°5′18.46″E
- Operator: Foshan Metro Operation Co., Ltd.
- Line: Line 2
- Platforms: 2 (1 island platform)
- Tracks: 2

Construction
- Structure type: Underground
- Accessible: Yes

Other information
- Station code: F217

History
- Opened: 28 December 2021 (4 years ago)

Services
Preceding station	Foshan Metro	Following station
Shiwan towards Nanzhuang	Line 2	Kuiqi Lu towards Guangzhou South Railway Station
Location

Shagang station (simplified Chinese: 沙岗站; traditional Chinese: 沙崗站; pinyin: Shāgǎng Zhàn; Cantonese Yale: Sāagōng Jaahm) is a station on Line 2 of Foshan Metro, located in Foshan's Chancheng District. It opened on 28 December 2021.

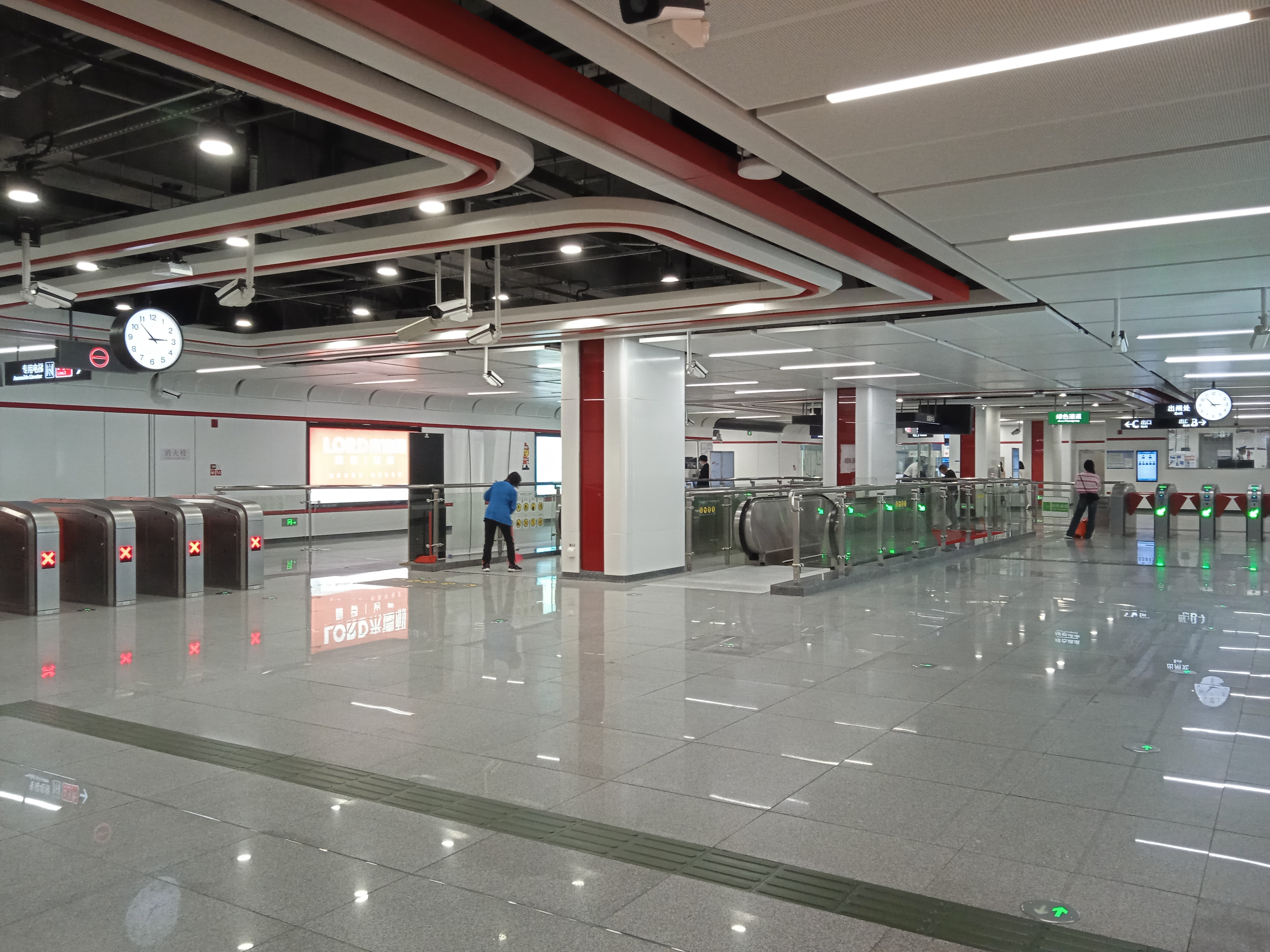
Concourse

== Station layout ==
The station has an island platform under West Kuiqi Road.

G	-	Exits A-D
L1; Concourse	Lobby	Ticket Machines, Customer Service, Shops, Police Station, Security Facilities
L2; Platforms	Platform 2	2 towards Nanzhuang (Shiwan)
L2; Platforms	Island platform, doors will open on the left
L2; Platforms	Platform 1	2 towards Guangzhou South Railway Station (Kuiqi Lu)

=== Entrances/exits ===
The station has 4 points of entry/exit. Exit A is equipped with an elevator.

- A: Kuiqi West Road
- B: Kuiqi West Road
- C: Kuiqi West Road
- D: Kuiqi West Road
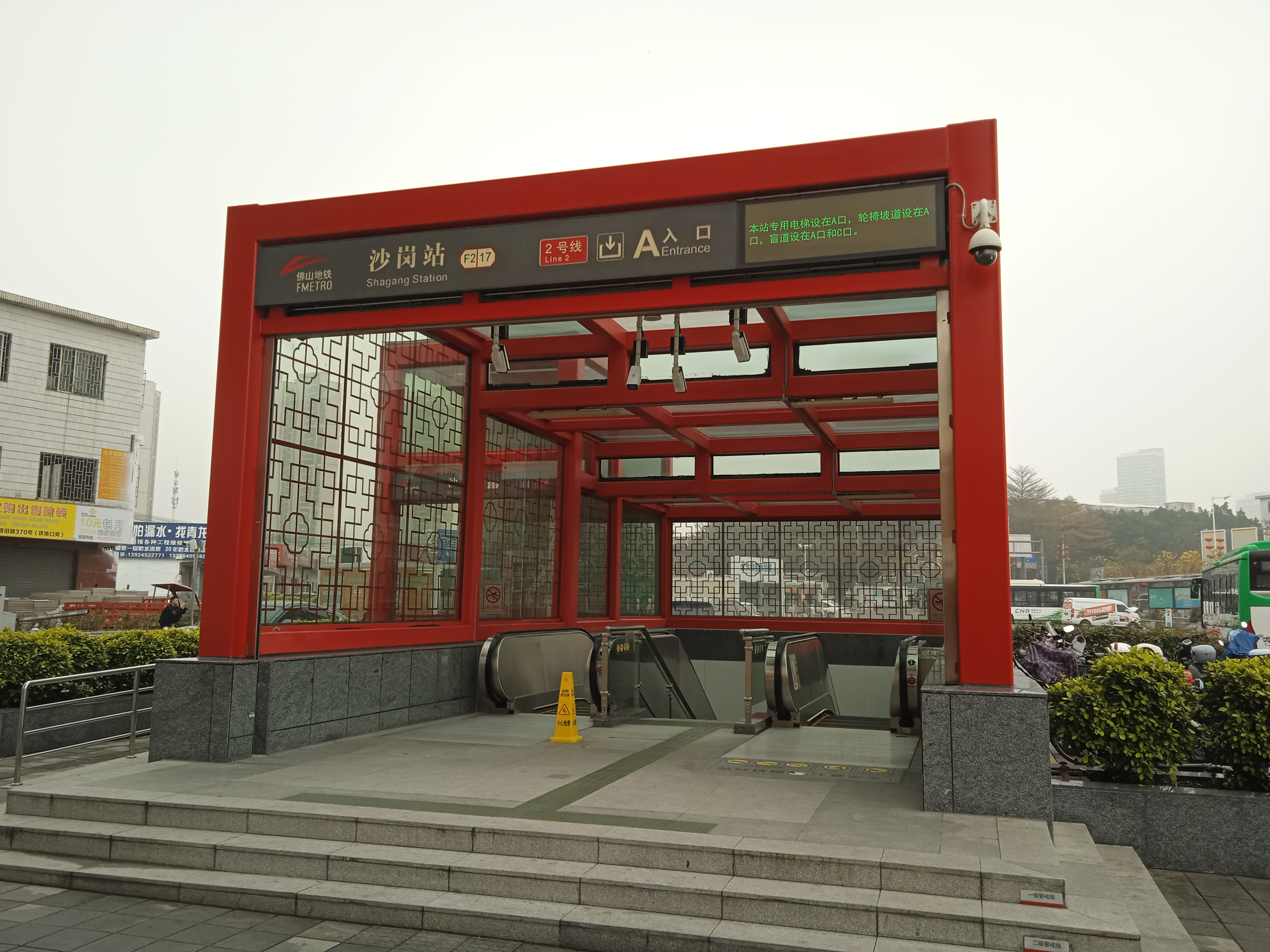
Entrance A

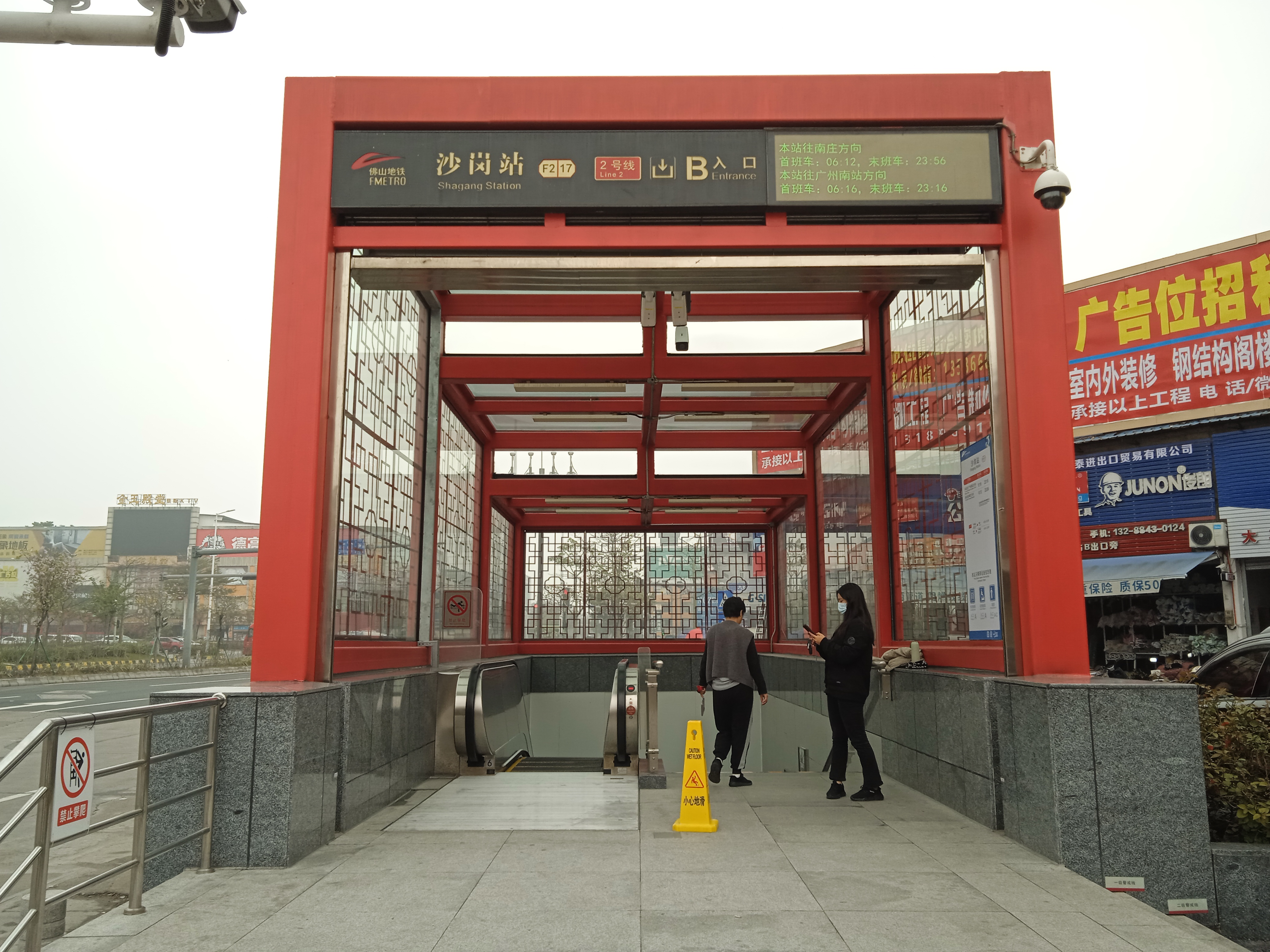
Entrance B

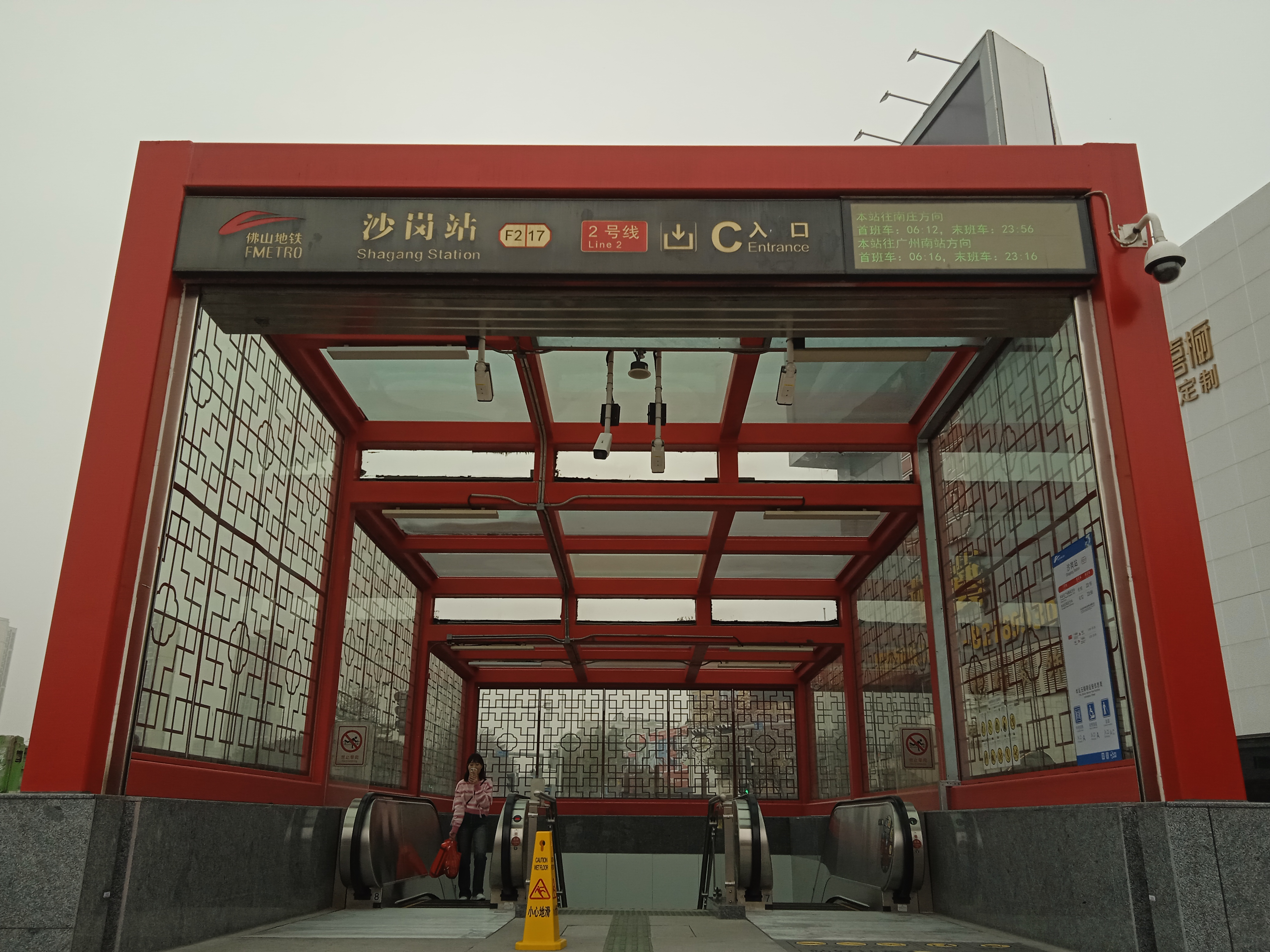
Entrance C

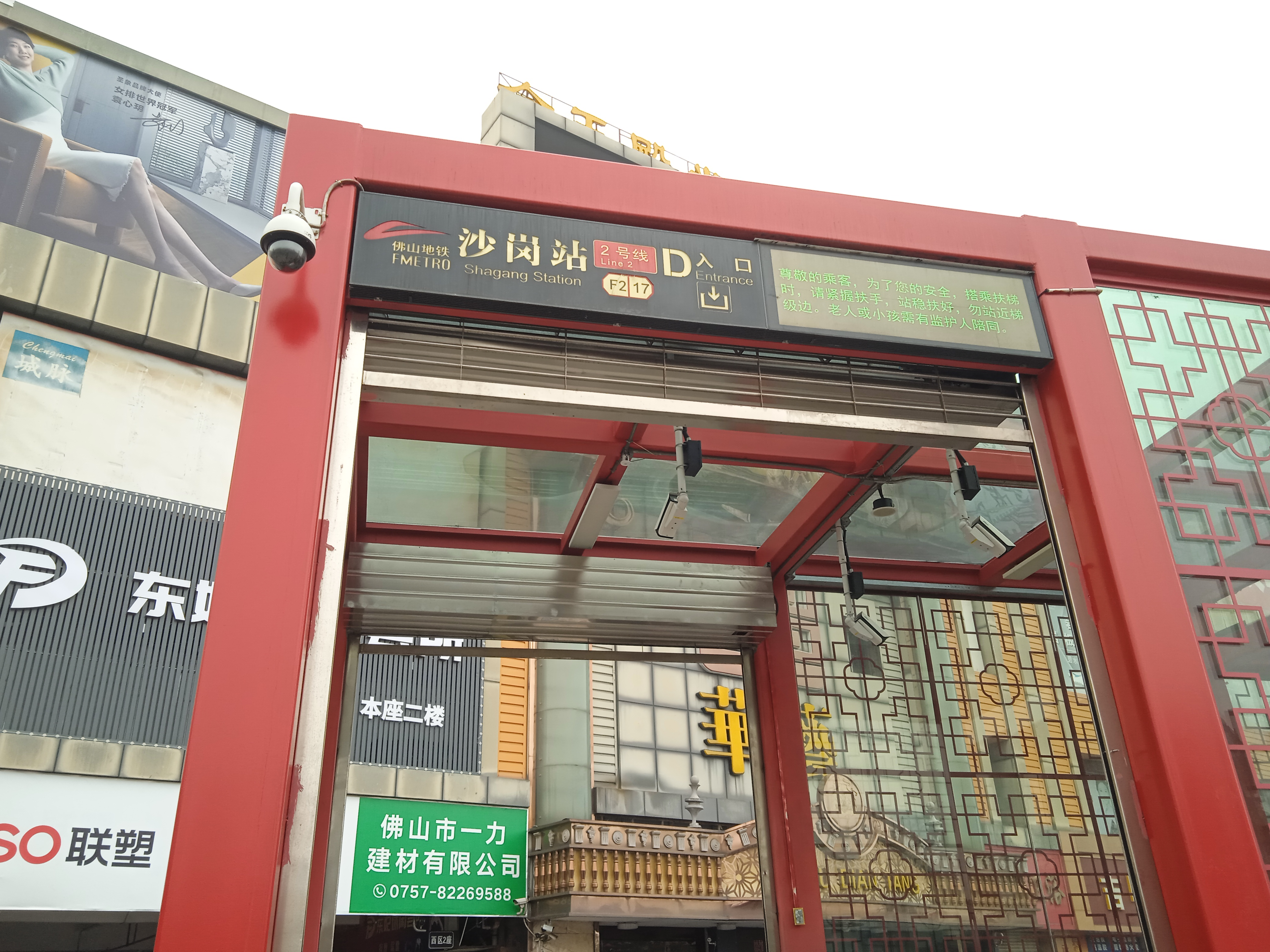
Entrance D

== History ==
The station topped out on 25 November 2019, making it the last station in Foshan to top out in the initial phase of Line 2. The station's ancillary structure and entrances/exit sites began to be enclosed in January 2020.
