= Shiwan station =

Foshan Metro Line 2 station

Shiwan 石湾
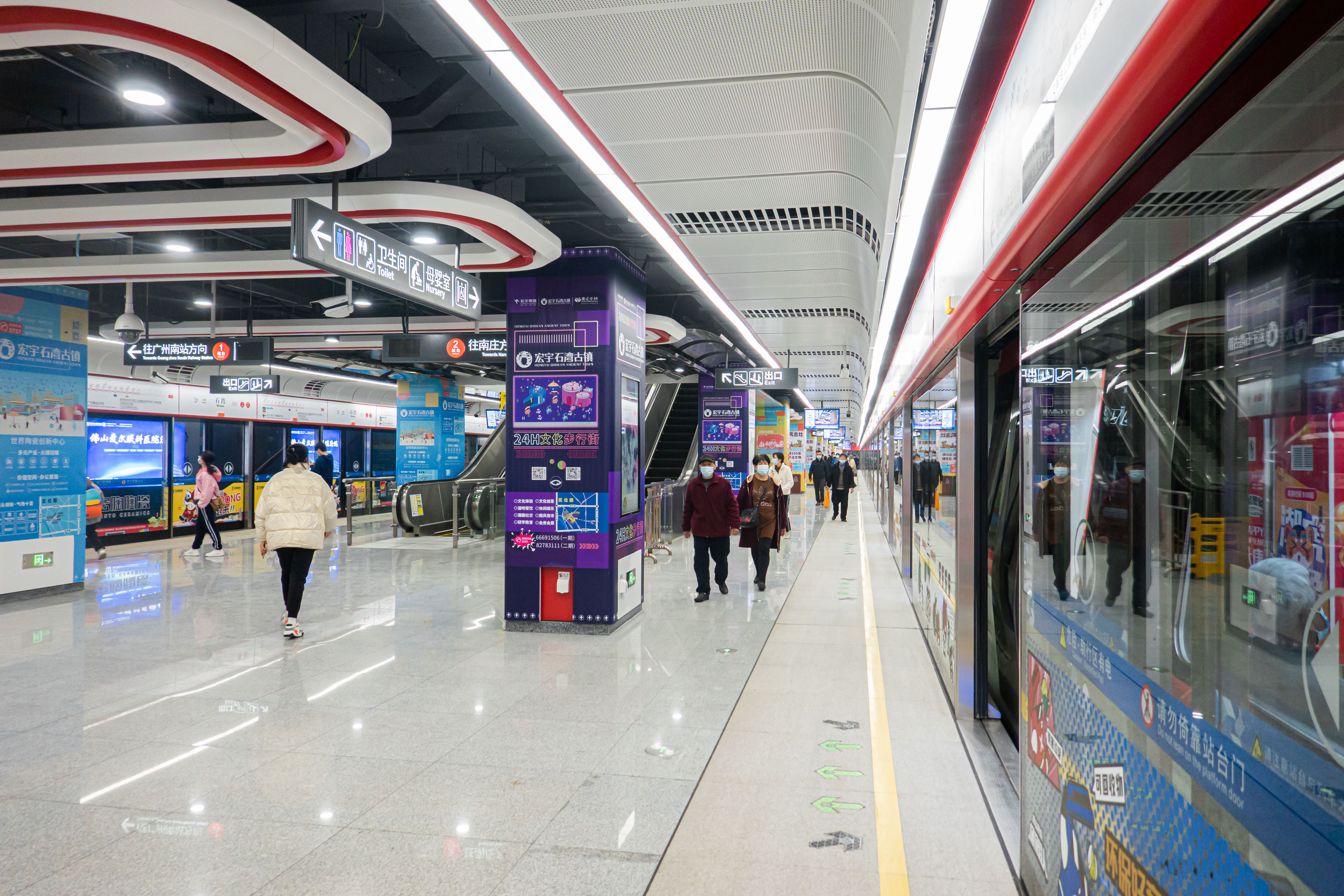
- Platform

Chinese name
- Simplified Chinese: 石湾站
- Traditional Chinese: 石灣站
Transcriptions
Standard Mandarin
- Hanyu Pinyin: Shíwān Zhàn
Yue: Cantonese
- Yale Romanization: Sehkwāan Jaahm
- Jyutping: Sek^{6}waan^{1} Zaam^{6}

General information
- Location: Intersection of Zhenzhong Road (镇中路) and Heping Road (和平路), Shiwanzhen Subdistrict; Chancheng District, Foshan, Guangdong; China
- Coordinates: 23°0′30.97″N 113°4′38.81″E
- Operator: Foshan Metro Operation Co., Ltd.
- Line: Line 2
- Platforms: 2 (1 island platform)
- Tracks: 2

Construction
- Structure type: Underground
- Accessible: Yes

Other information
- Station code: F216

History
- Opened: 28 December 2021 (4 years ago)

Services
Preceding station	Foshan Metro	Following station
Zhangcha towards Nanzhuang	Line 2	Shagang towards Guangzhou South Railway Station
Location

Shiwan station (simplified Chinese: 石湾站; traditional Chinese: 石灣站; pinyin: Shíwān Zhàn; Cantonese Yale: Sehkwāan Jaahm; lit. 'Stone Bay station') is a station on Line 2 of Foshan Metro, located in Foshan's Chancheng District. It opened on 28 December 2021.

== Station theme ==
Shiwan Station is one of the featured stations of the line, with the theme of "Mobile Museum", showcasing the long-standing ceramic culture of Shiwan Town. A 26-meter-long, 1.7-meter-wide "Shiwan Ancient Eight Scenes" cultural wall is set up on the station hall floor of the station, and in cooperation with the Guangdong Shiwan Ceramics Museum, a variety of ceramic artworks and souvenirs are exhibited in the station. The ceiling of the station is also designed with a characteristic metal "Tile Porcelain".

== Station layout ==
The station has an island platform under Zhenzhong Road.

G	-	Exits A-D
L1; Concourse	Lobby	Ticket Machines, Customer Service, Shops, Police Station, Security Facilities
L2; Platforms	Platform 2	2 towards Nanzhuang (Zhangcha)
L2; Platforms	Island platform, doors will open on the left
L2; Platforms	Platform 1	2 towards Guangzhou South Railway Station (Shagang)
L3; Reserved Platforms		5 reserved track area
L3; Reserved Platforms	Reserved Island platform
L3; Reserved Platforms		5 reserved track area

=== Entrances/exits ===
The station has 4 points of entry/exit. Exit A is equipped with an elevator, and Exit B is equipped with a ramp.

- A: Zhenzhong 2nd Road
- B: Zhenzhong 2nd Road, Foshan Fuxing Chancheng Hospital
- C: Heping Road
- D: Heping Road, Guangdong Shiwan Ceramics Museum, Nanfeng Kiln
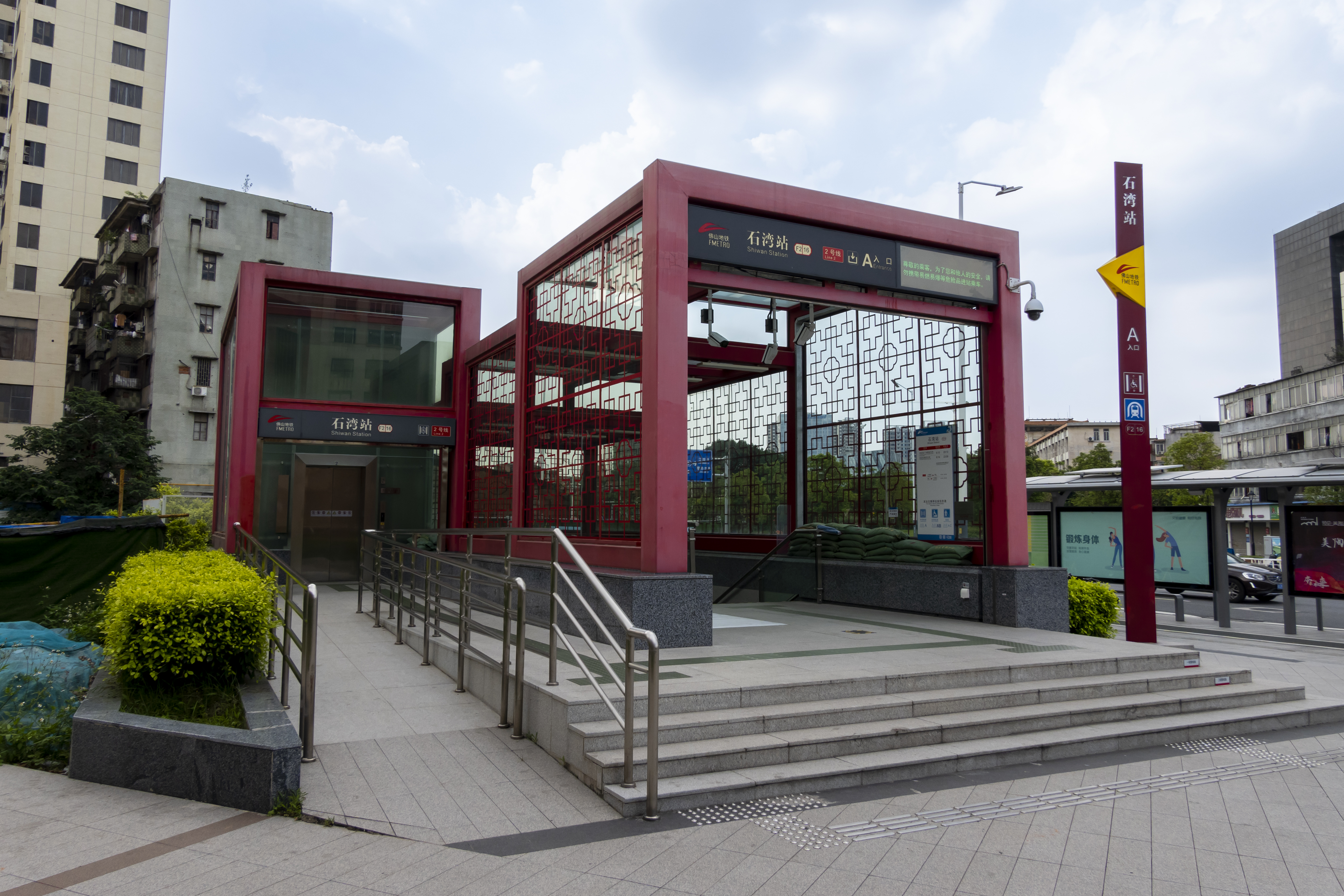
Entrance A

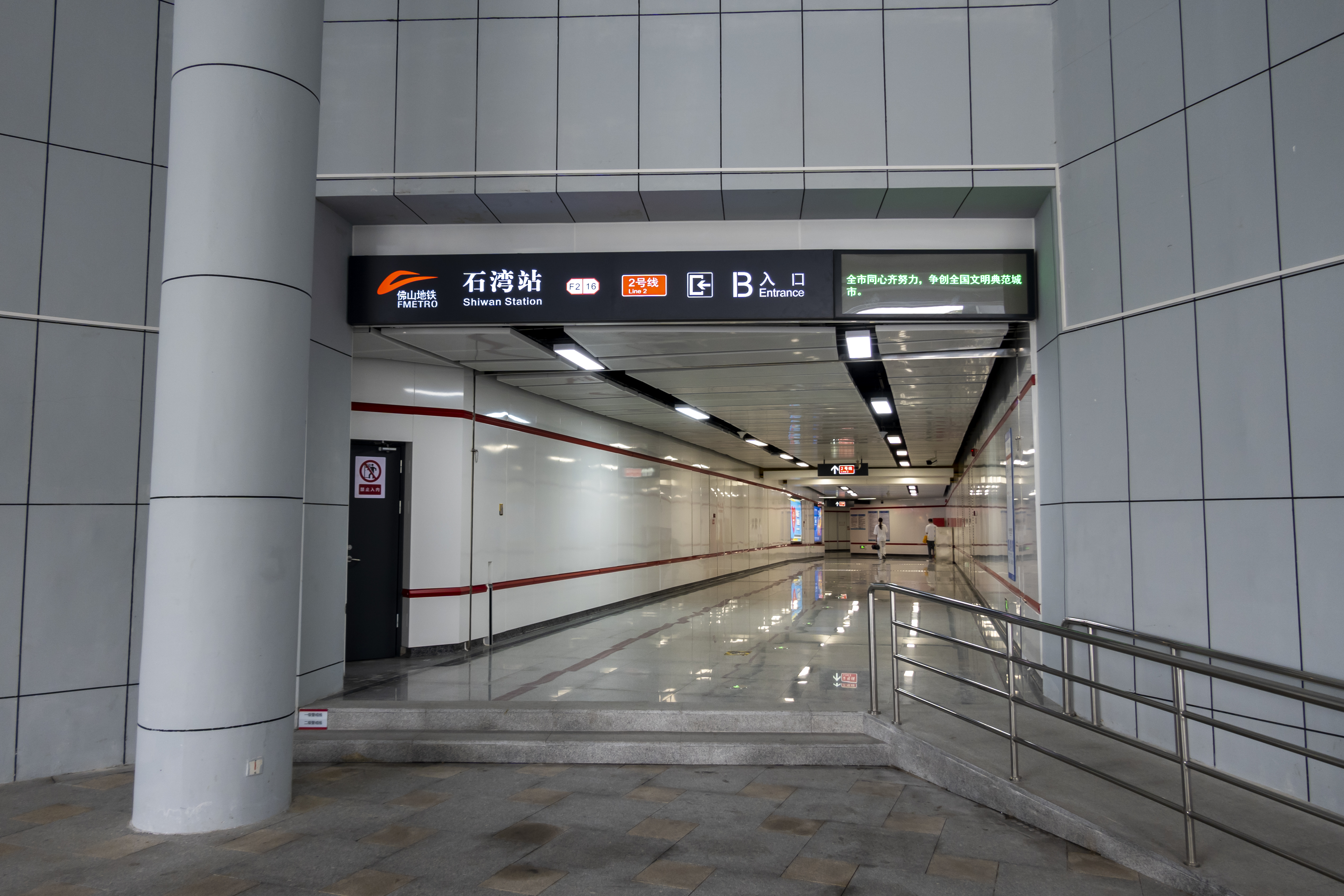
Entrance B

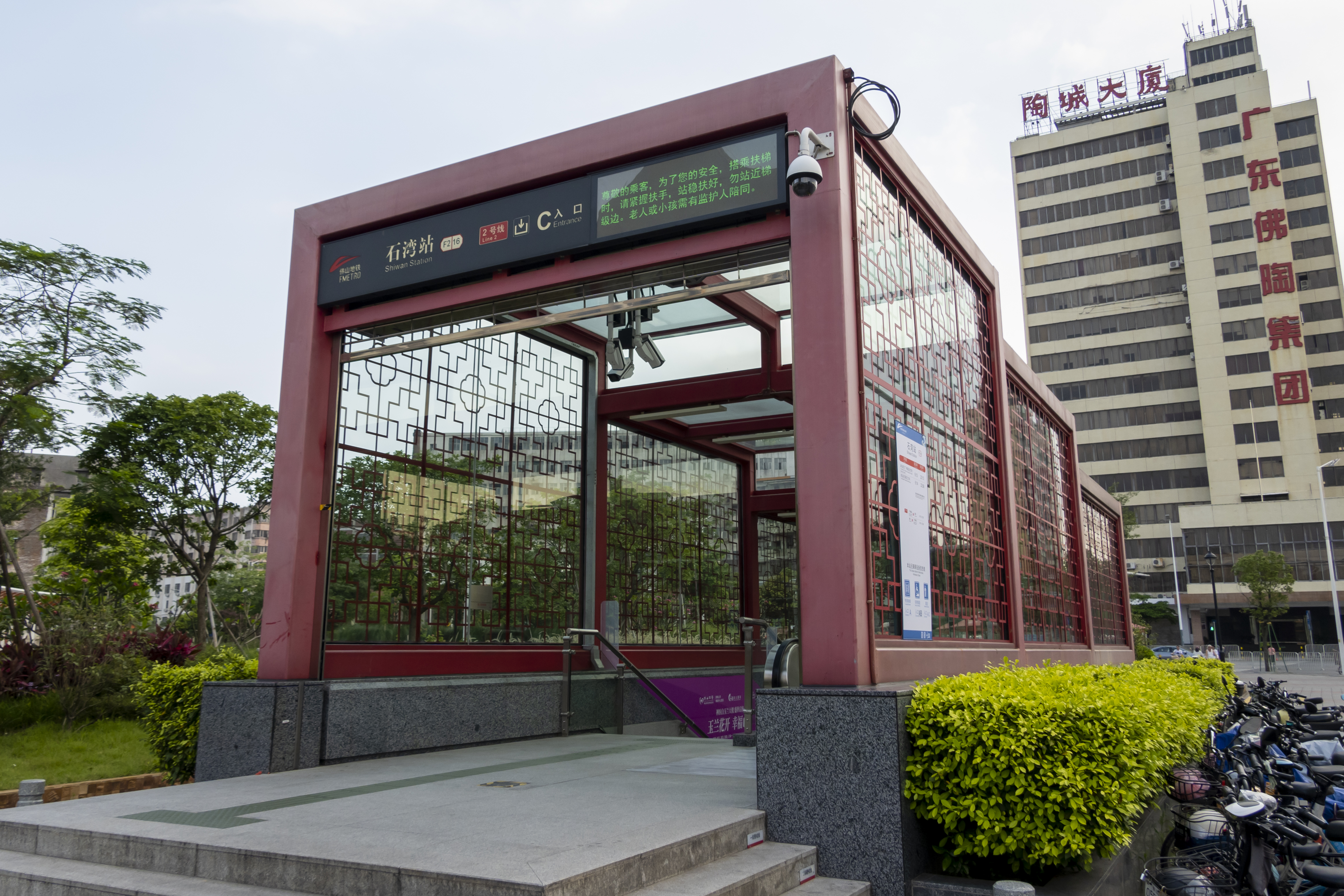
Entrance C

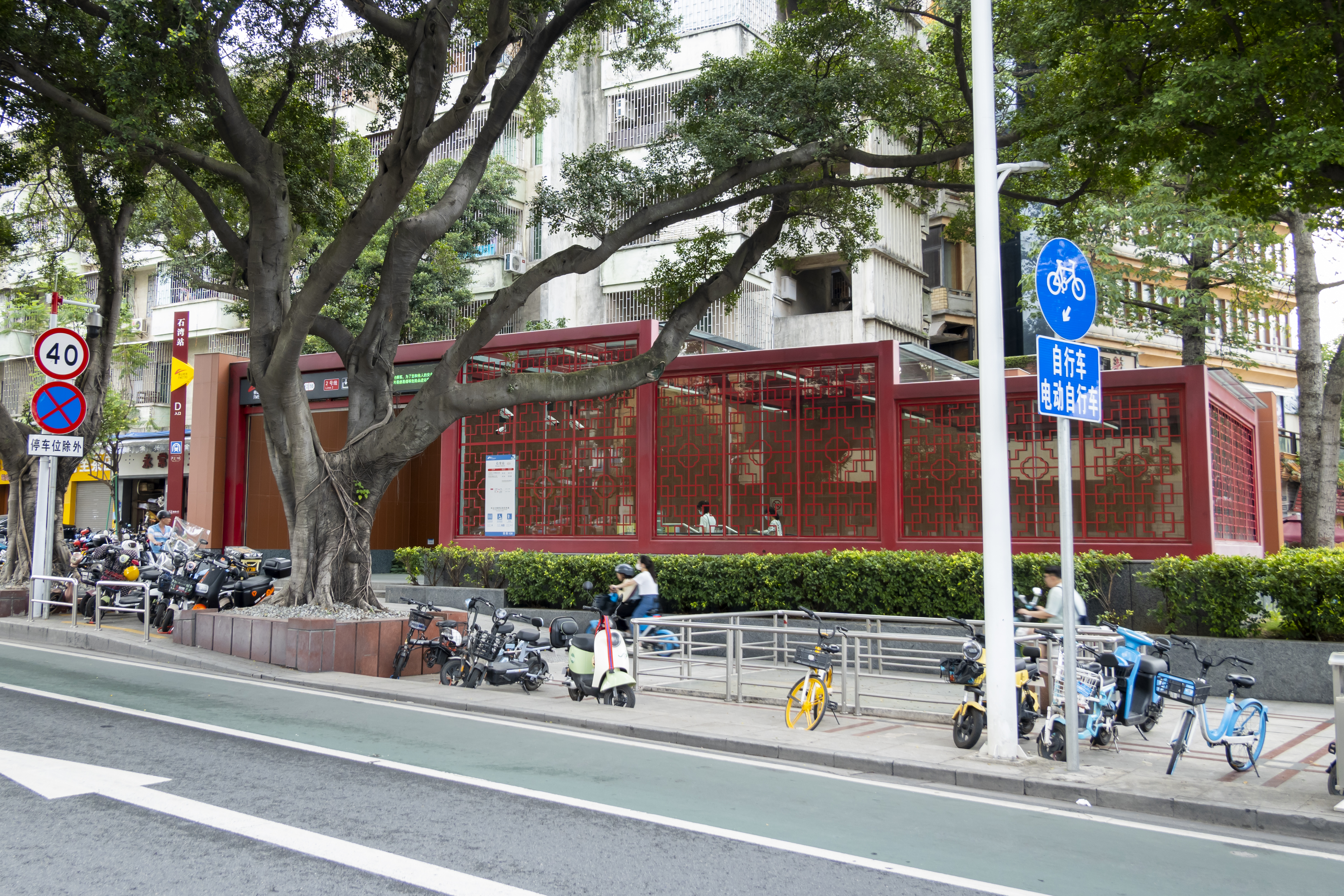
Entrance D

== Gallery ==
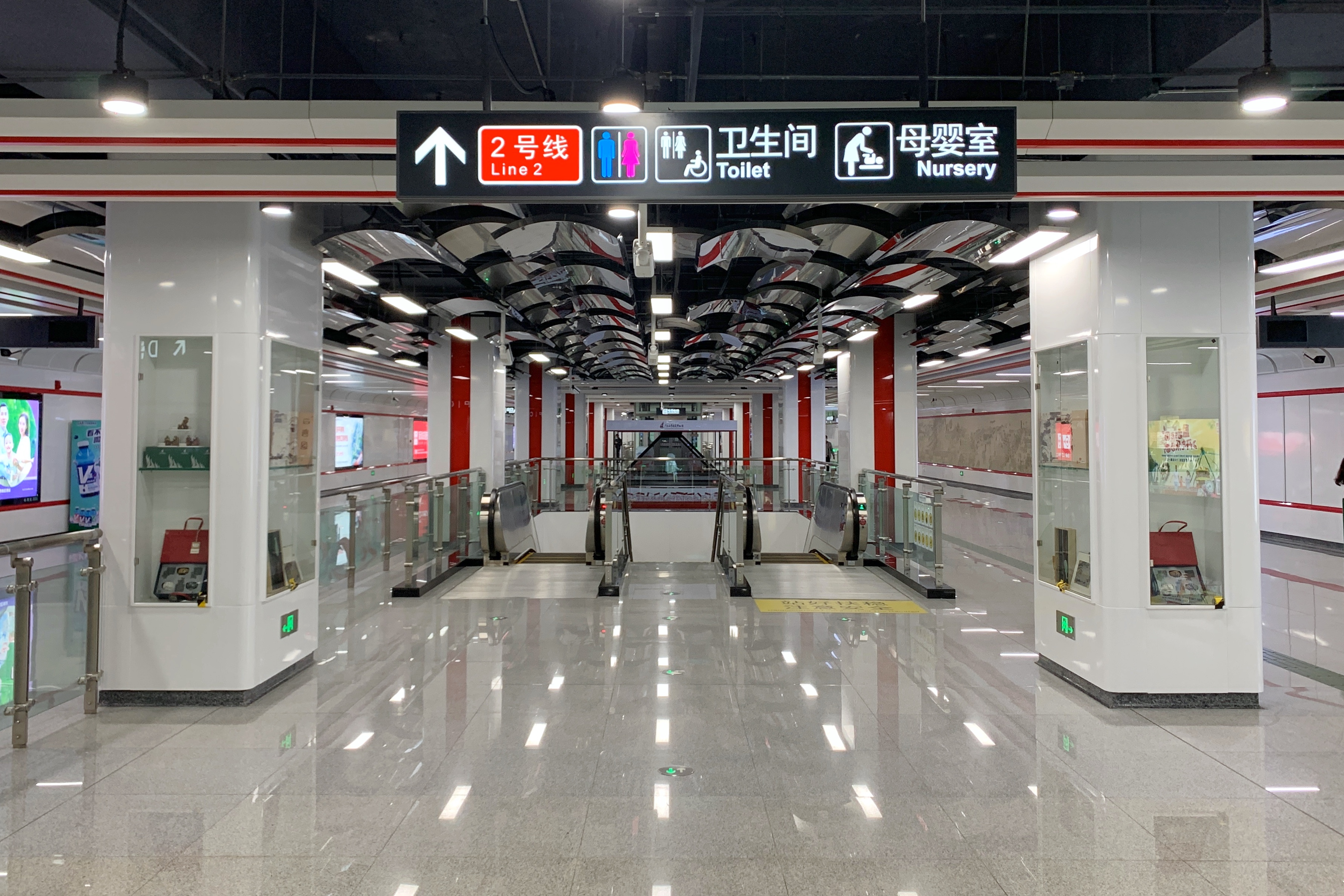
Concourse and the "Tile Porcelain" design ceiling and various ceramic exhibits

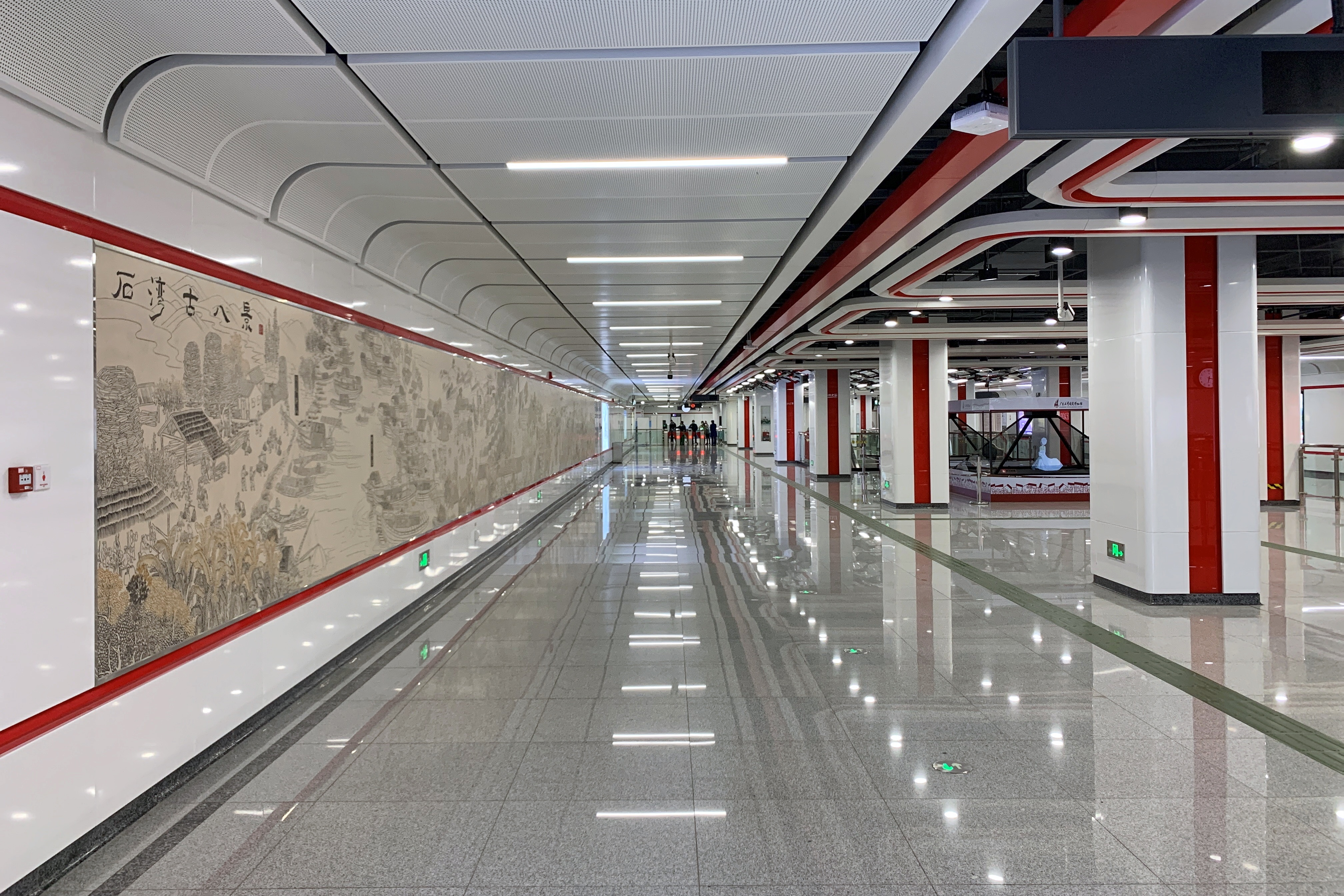
Concourse and murals of "Eight Ancient Views of Shiwan"

== Future development ==
The station is planned to have an interchange with Line 5, and the station structure was pre-built and reserved at the time of the construction of Line 2.
