= Wanhua station (Foshan Metro) =

Foshan Metro Line 2 and Line 3 station

Wanhua 湾华
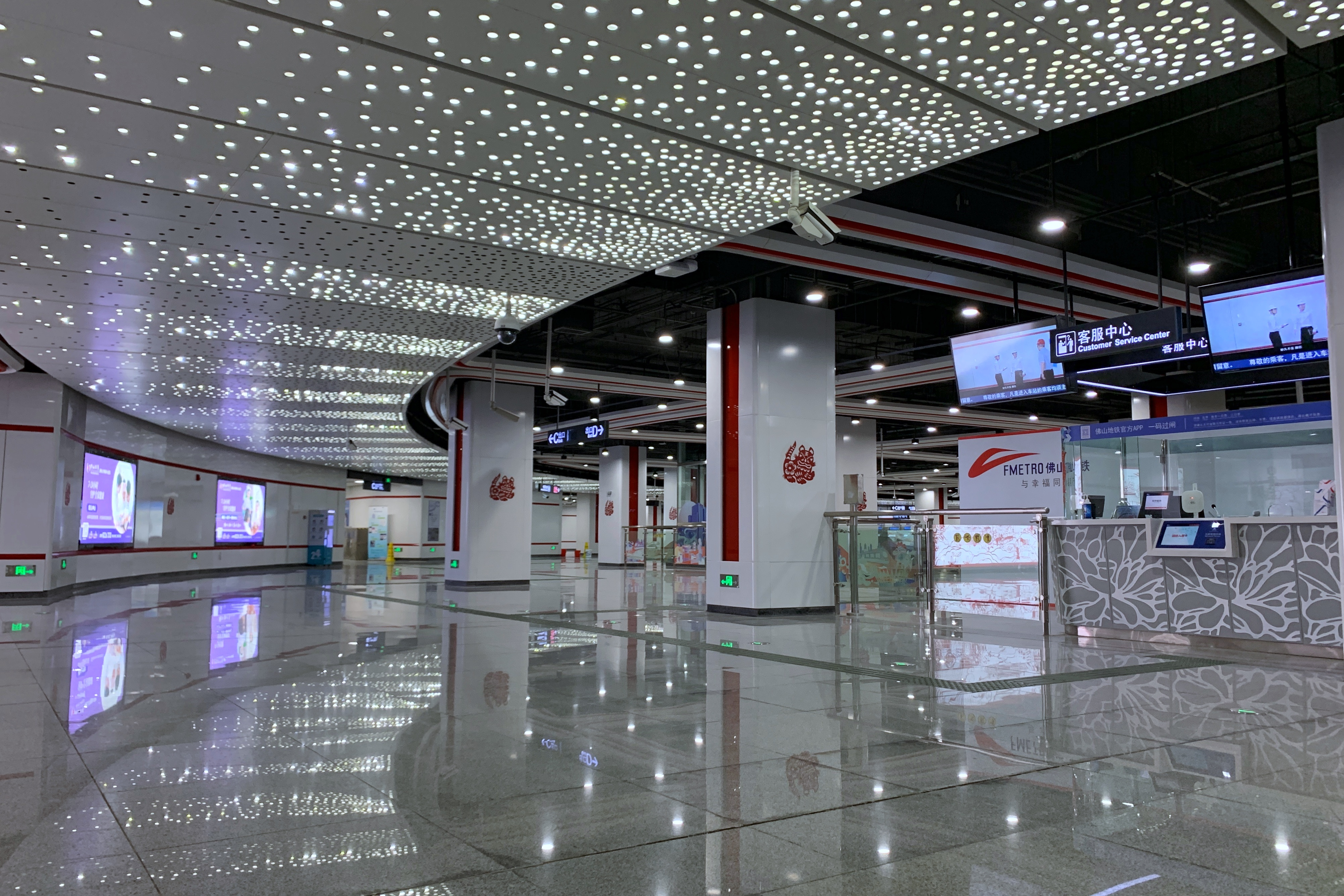
- Concourse unpaid area

Chinese name
- Simplified Chinese: 湾华站
- Traditional Chinese: 灣華站
Transcriptions
Standard Mandarin
- Hanyu Pinyin: Wānhuá Zhàn
Yue: Cantonese
- Yale Romanization: Wāanwǎ Jaahm
- Jyutping: Waan^{1}waa^{4} Zaam^{6}

General information
- Location: Intersection of Kuiqi 2nd Road (魁奇二路) and Wenhua Road (文华路), Shiwanzhen Subdistrict; Chancheng District, Foshan, Guangdong; China
- Coordinates: 22°59′40.84″N 113°7′34.15″E
- Operator: Foshan Metro Operation Co., Ltd.
- Lines: Line 2 Line 3
- Platforms: 6 (2 island platforms and 2 side platforms)
- Tracks: 4

Construction
- Structure type: Underground
- Platform levels: 2
- Accessible: Yes

Other information
- Station code: F220 F320

History
- Opened: Line 2: 28 December 2021 (4 years ago); Line 3: 28 December 2022 (3 years ago)

Services
Preceding station	Foshan Metro	Following station
Shiliang towards Nanzhuang	Line 2	Dengzhou towards Guangzhou South Railway Station
Yayi Park towards Foshan University	Line 3	Dongping towards Shunde College Railway Station
Location

Wanhua station (simplified Chinese: 湾华站; traditional Chinese: 灣華站; pinyin: Wānhuá Zhàn; Cantonese Yale: Wāanwǎ Jaahm) is an interchange station between Line 2 and Line 3 of the Foshan Metro, located in Foshan's Chancheng District. Line 2 opened on 28 December 2021, whilst Line 3 opened exactly one year later on 28 December 2022.

This station is the largest station in the first phase of Line 2. In addition, the Foshan Metro Wanhua Control Center is located in the Foshan Metro Building near the station, which is the command center of the Foshan Metro network and the control center of several future Foshan subway lines.

== Theme ==
Wanhua Station is one of the featured stations of Line 2 and initial section of Line 3, with the themes of "Fashion Business" and "Stars Holding the Moon", showing the key and connectivity of the station location through "nets" and dotted empty design elements.

== Station layout ==
The Line 2 station has a pair of platforms adopting the Spanish solution, and is located under Kuiqi Road. The Line 3 station has an island platform under Middle Wenhua Road.

G	-	Exits A-D
L1; Concourse	Lobby	Ticket Machines, Customer Service, Shops, Police Station, Security Facilities
L2; Platforms	Mezzanine Level (North)	Towards concourse and 2 platforms, Station Equipment
L2; Platforms	Platform 5	3 towards Foshan University (Yayi Park)
L2; Platforms	Island platform, doors will open on the left, connection node to 2
L2; Platforms	Platform 6	3 towards Shunde College Railway Station (Dongping)
L2; Platforms	Mezzanine Level (South)	Towards concourse and 2 platforms, Station Equipment
L3; Platforms
L3; Platforms	Platform 4	Side platform, doors will open on the right, alighting only, connection node to 3
L3; Platforms		2 towards Nanzhuang (Shiliang)
L3; Platforms	Platform 2 Platform 1	Island platform, doors will open on the left, boarding only
L3; Platforms		2 towards Guangzhou South Railway Station (Dengzhou)
L3; Platforms	Platform 3	Side platform, doors will open on the right, alighting only, connection node to 3

=== Entrances/exits ===
The station has 4 points of entry/exit. Exit C is equipped with an elevator.

- A: Kuiqi 2nd Road
- B: Kuiqi 2nd Road, Foshan Metro Building, Foshan Metro Group Co., Ltd.
- C: Kuiqi 2nd Road, Foshan Intermediate People's Court
- D: Kuiqi 2nd Road
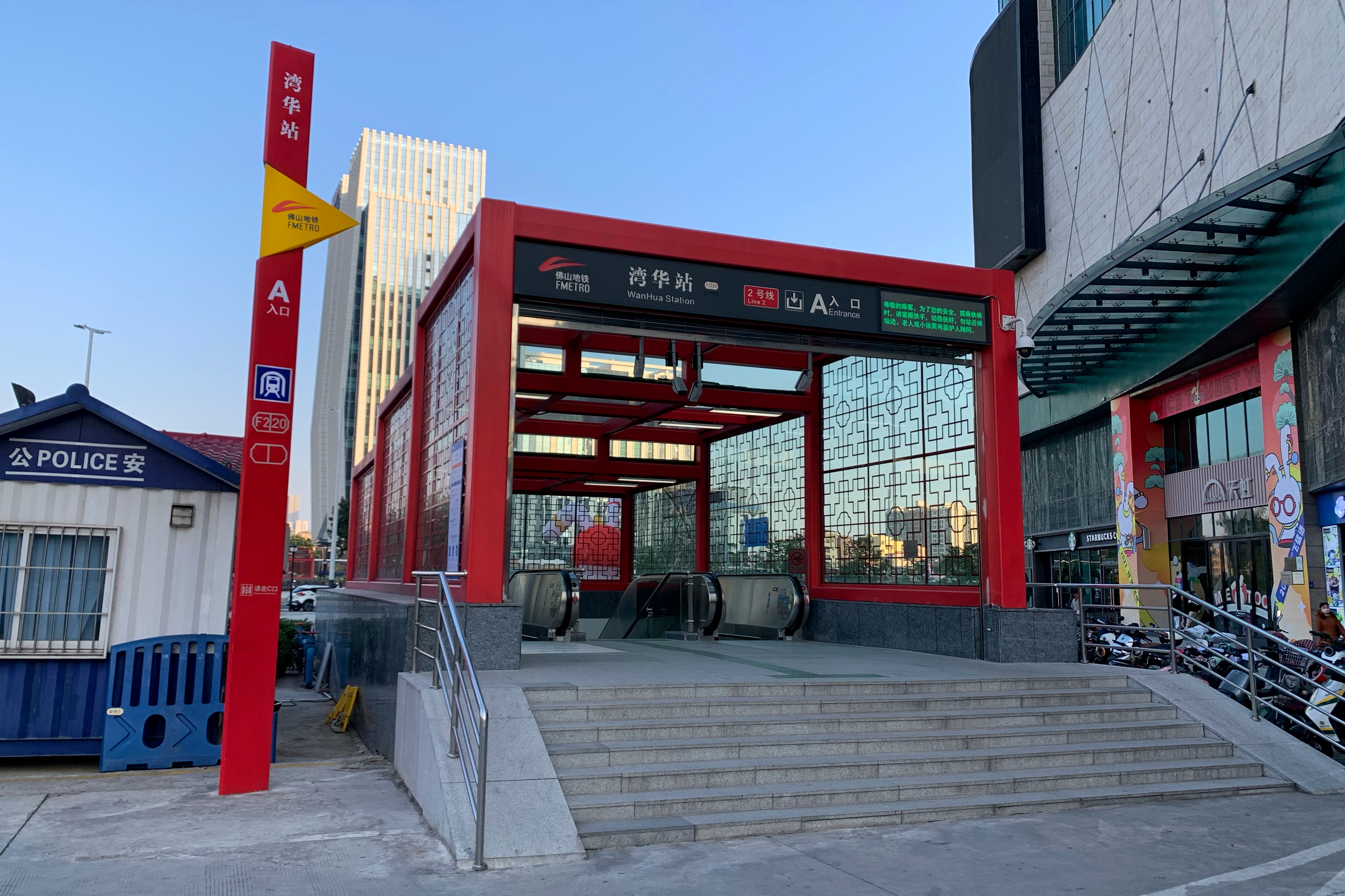
Entrance A

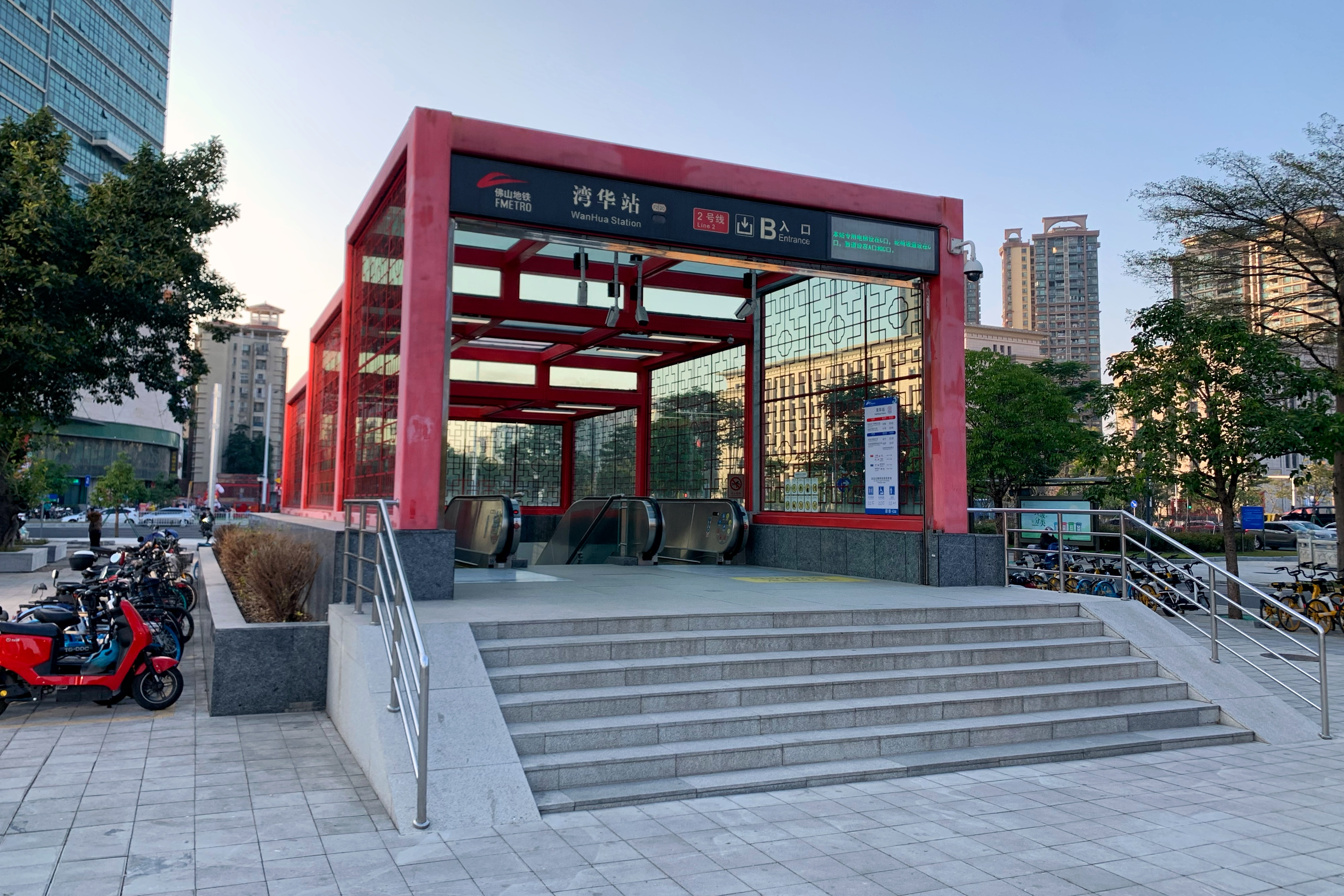
Entrance B

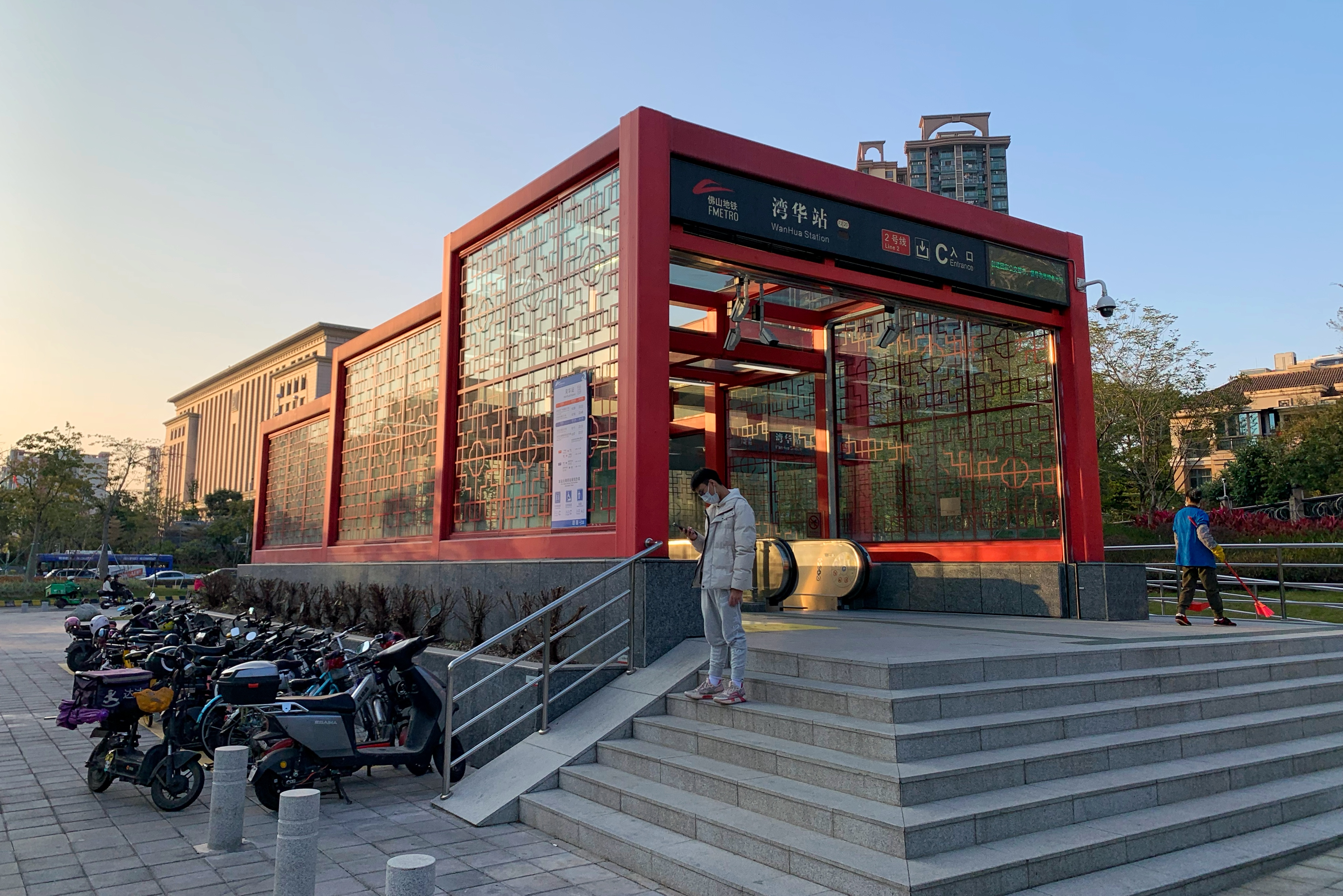
Entrance C

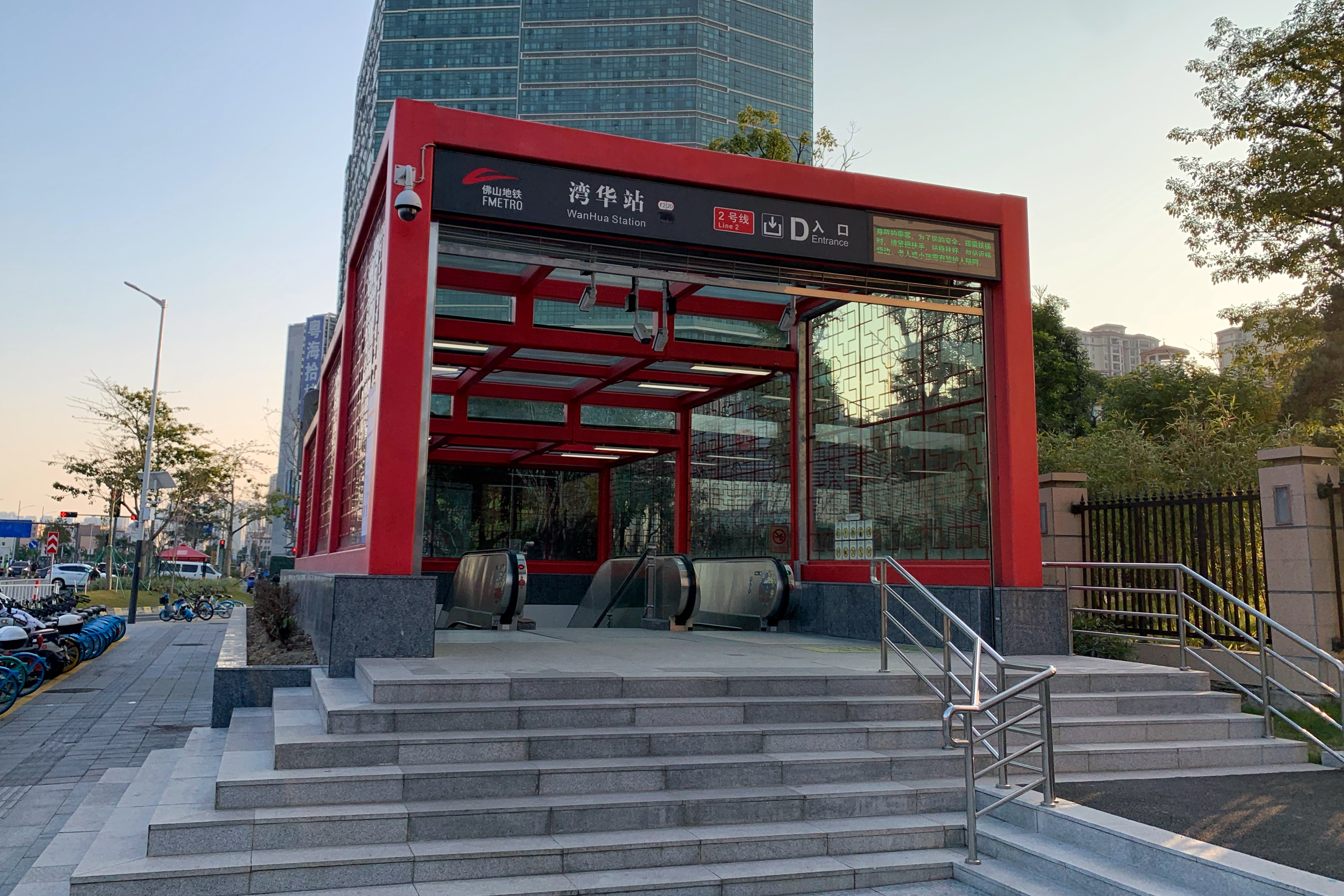
Entrance D

=== Transfer style ===
The passenger flow line of Line 2 of this station is similar to that of Gongyuanqian and Caihong Bridge stations, with the island platform of Line 2 used for boarding and the two side platforms for getting off.

In terms of transfers, arriving passengers on Line 3 can go down the stairs in the middle of the platform to the island platform of Line 2. Arriving passengers of Line 2 can also go up to the platform of Line 3 through the transfer escalator in the middle of the side platform. The corresponding nodes are one-way traffic.

In addition, there is a single crossover on the east side of the platform on Line 2, and a single crossover on the south side of the platform on Line 3. When either line has any disruption, the train will be able to turnback using this station as the temporary terminus. At the same time, the connecting lines of Lines 2 and 3 are also located in the southeast quadrant of the station for train transfer.

All platforms of Line 2 are equipped with toilets, the toilets of the two side platforms are located in the middle of the platform, and the toilets of the island platform are located at the western end of the platform.

== Gallery ==
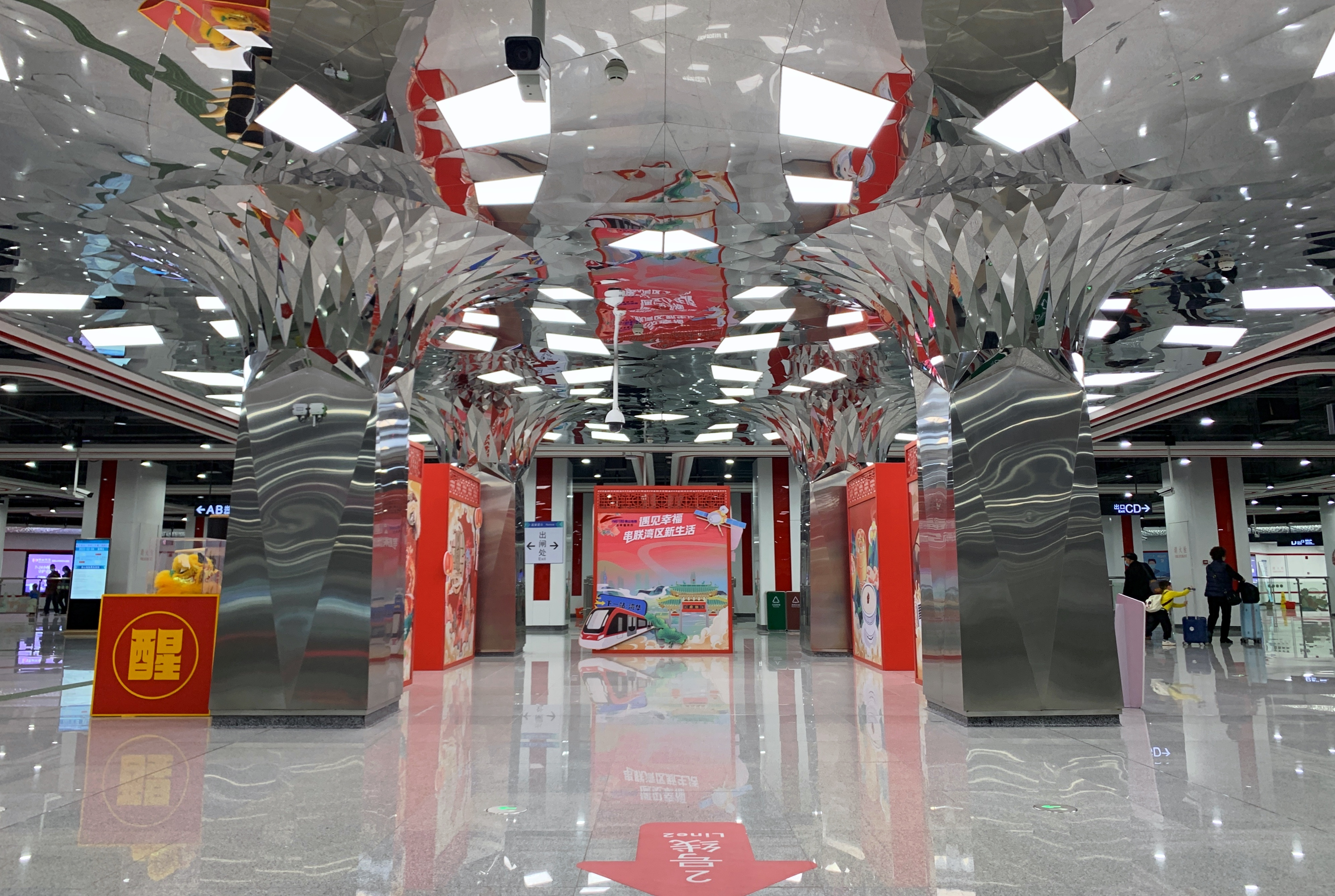
Concourse decoration

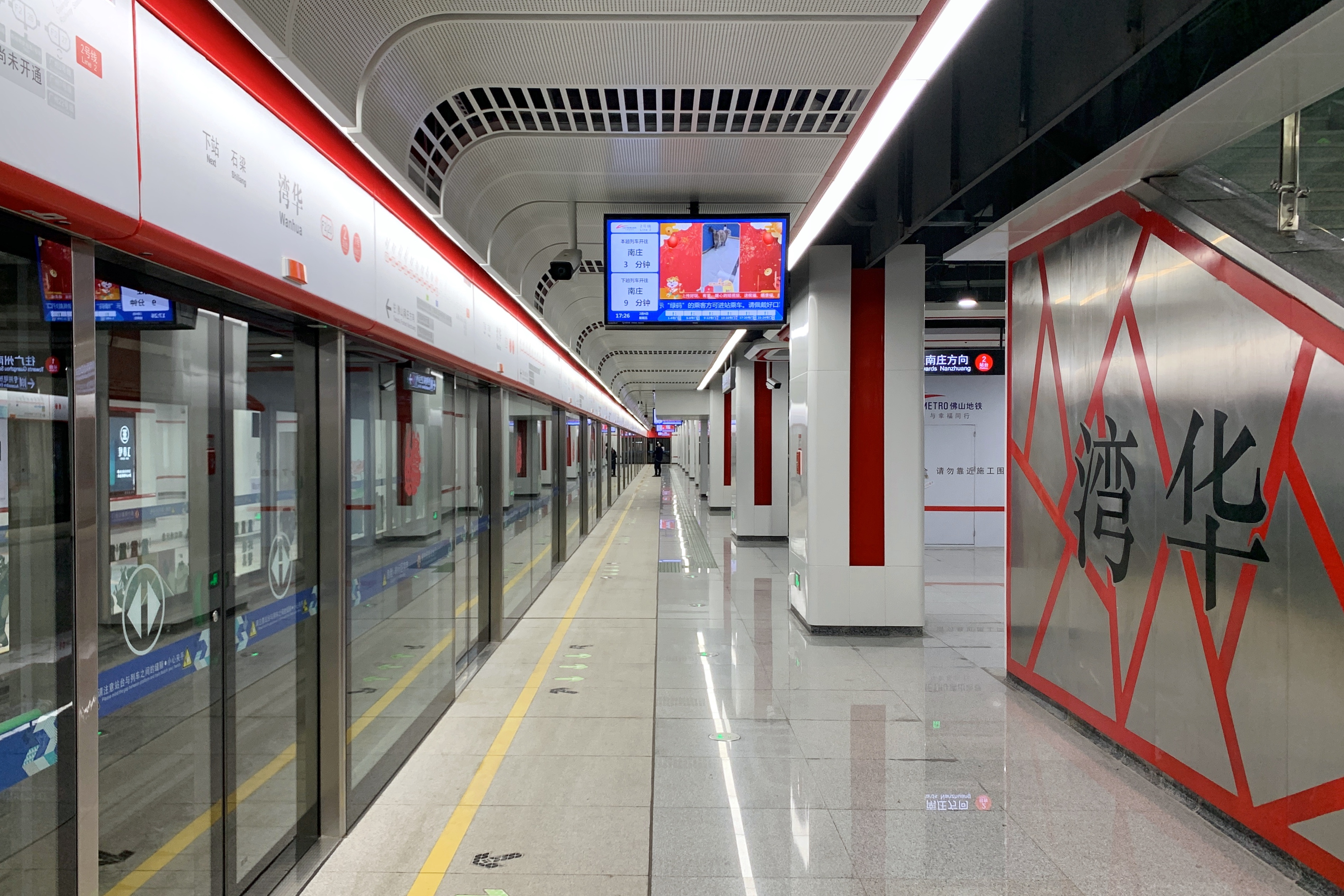
Line 2 platform

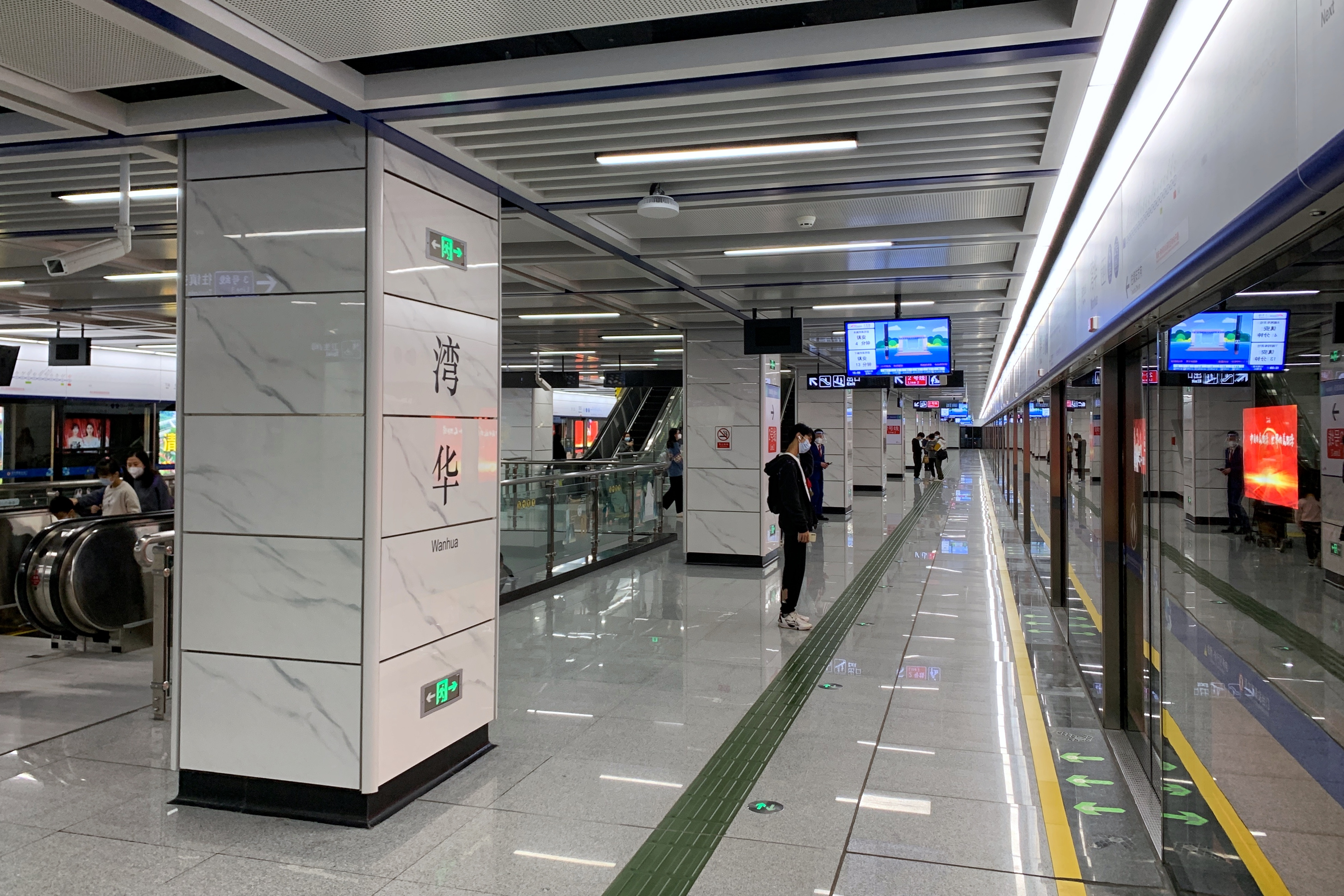
Line 3 platform
