= Shiliang station =

Foshan Metro Line 2 station

Shiliang 石梁
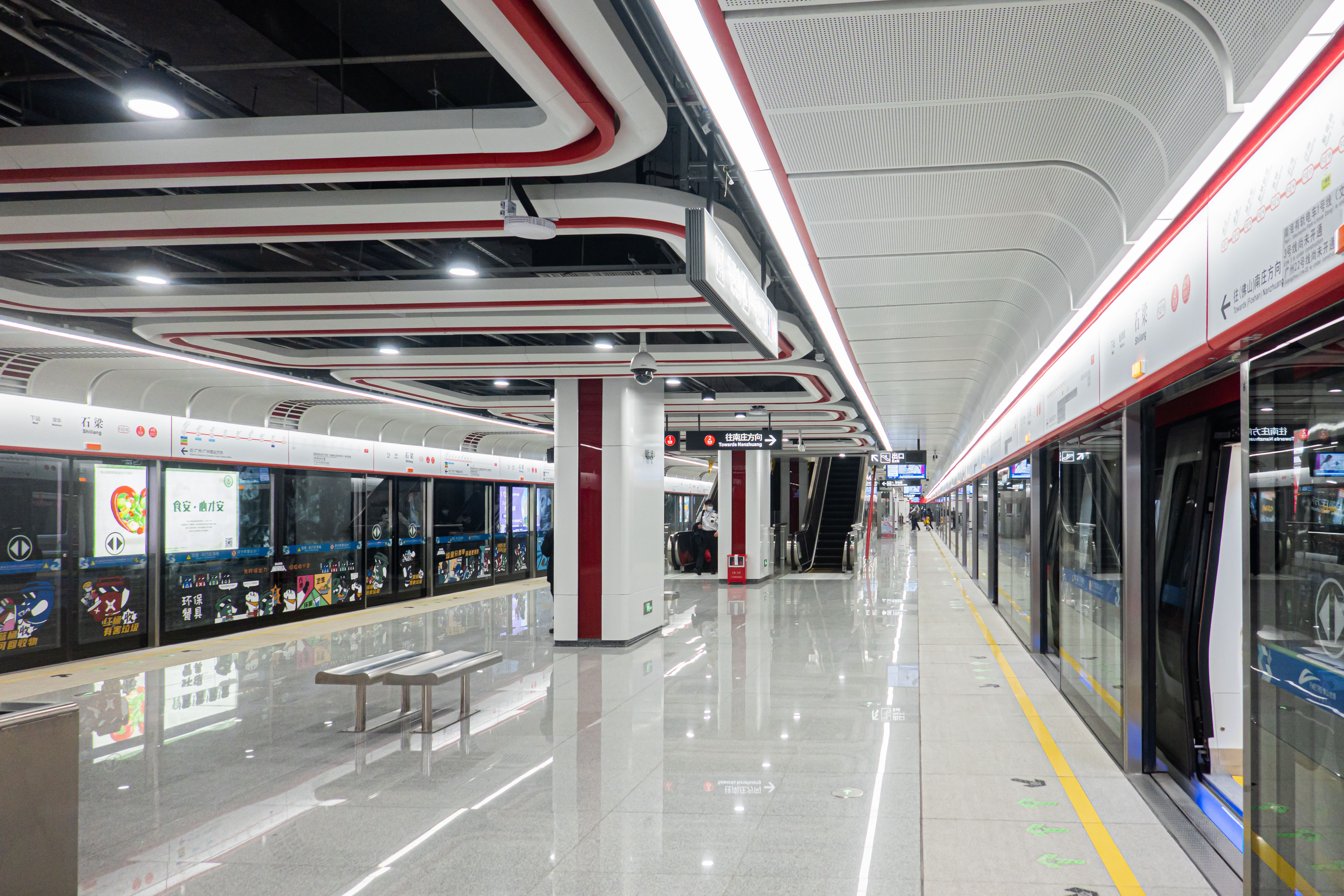
- Platform

Chinese name
- Simplified Chinese: 石梁站
- Traditional Chinese: 石樑站
Transcriptions
Standard Mandarin
- Hanyu Pinyin: Shíliáng Zhàn
Yue: Cantonese
- Yale Romanization: Sehklèuhng Jaahm
- Jyutping: Sek^{6}loeng^{4} Zaam^{6}

General information
- Location: Intersection of Kuiqi 1st Road (魁奇一路) and Jinlan North Road (金澜北路), Shiwanzhen Subdistrict; Chancheng District, Foshan, Guangdong; China
- Coordinates: 22°59′43.10″N 113°6′48.04″E
- Operator: Foshan Metro Operation Co., Ltd.
- Line: Line 2
- Platforms: 2 (1 island platform)
- Tracks: 2

Construction
- Structure type: Underground
- Accessible: Yes

Other information
- Station code: F219

History
- Opened: 28 December 2021 (4 years ago)

Services
Preceding station	Foshan Metro	Following station
Kuiqi Lu towards Nanzhuang	Line 2	Wanhua towards Guangzhou South Railway Station
Location

Shiliang station (simplified Chinese: 石梁站; traditional Chinese: 石樑站; pinyin: Shíliáng Zhàn; Cantonese Yale: Sehklèuhng Jaahm) is a station on Line 2 of Foshan Metro, located in Foshan's Chancheng District. It opened on 28 December 2021.

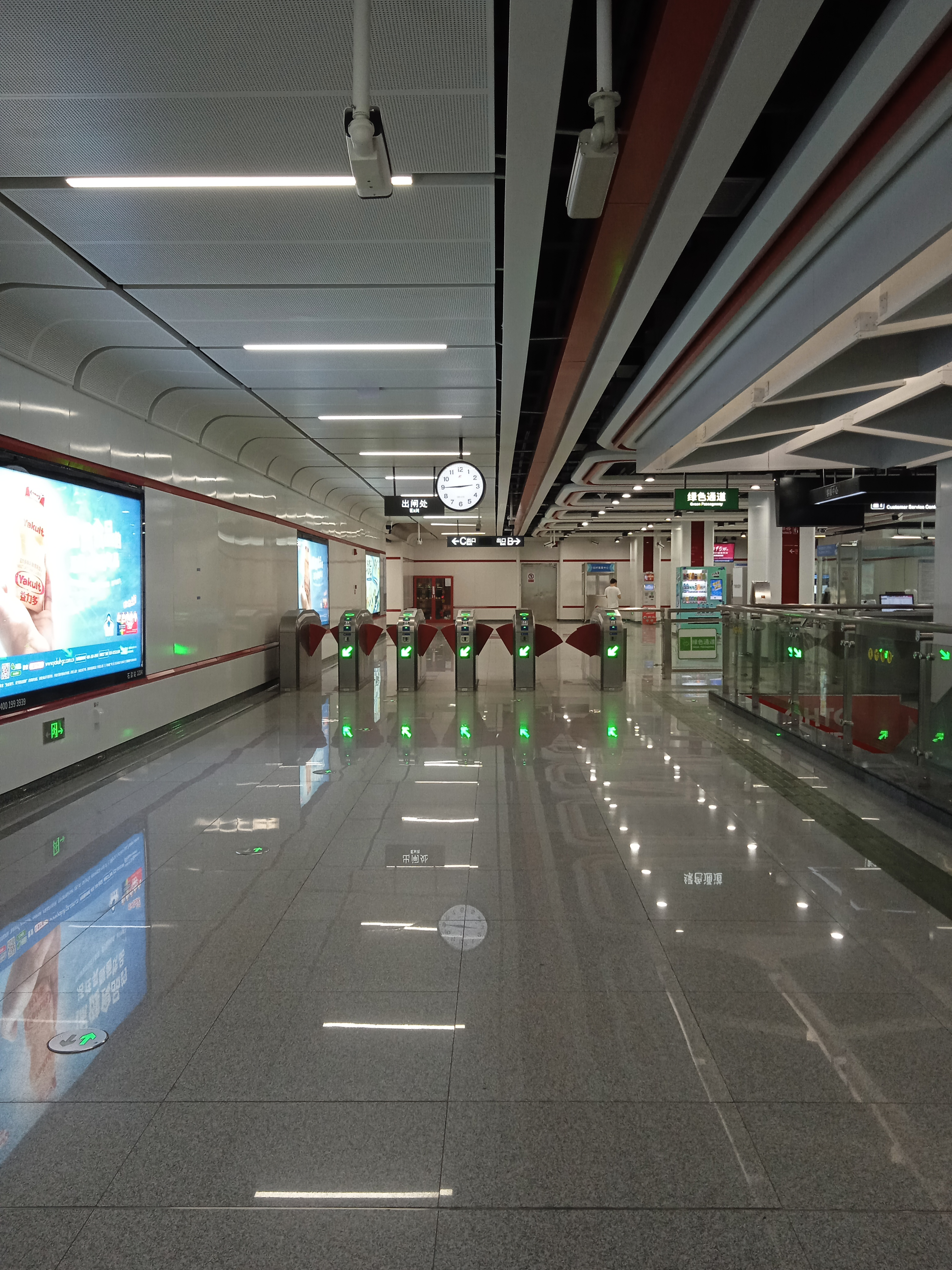
Concourse

== Station layout ==
The station has an island platform under Kuiqi 1st Road.

G	-	Exits A-D
L1; Concourse	Lobby	Ticket Machines, Customer Service, Shops, Police Station, Security Facilities
L2; Platforms	Platform 2	2 towards Nanzhuang (Kuiqi Lu)
L2; Platforms	Island platform, doors will open on the left
L2; Platforms	Platform 1	2 towards Guangzhou South Railway Station (Wanhua)

=== Entrances/exits ===
The station was designed with 4 points of entry/exit, but Exit C was not opened in tandem with the station. Exit C was subsequently completed and opened on 5 August 2022. Exit D is equipped with an elevator.

- A: Kuiqi 1st Road, Chancheng District Government Administrative Service Center
- B: Kuiqi 1st Road
- C: Kuiqi 1st Road
- D: Kuiqi 1st Road
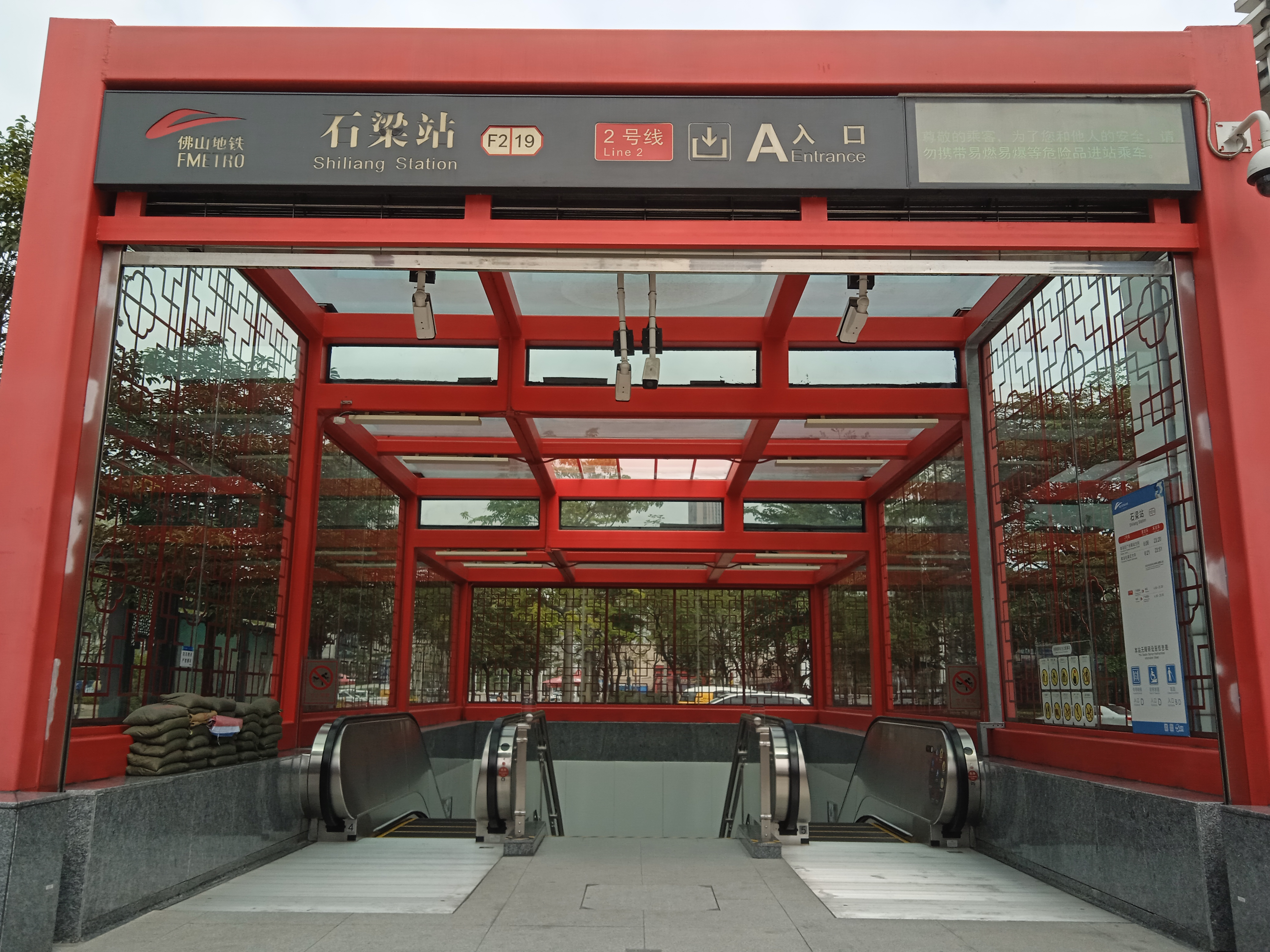
Entrance A

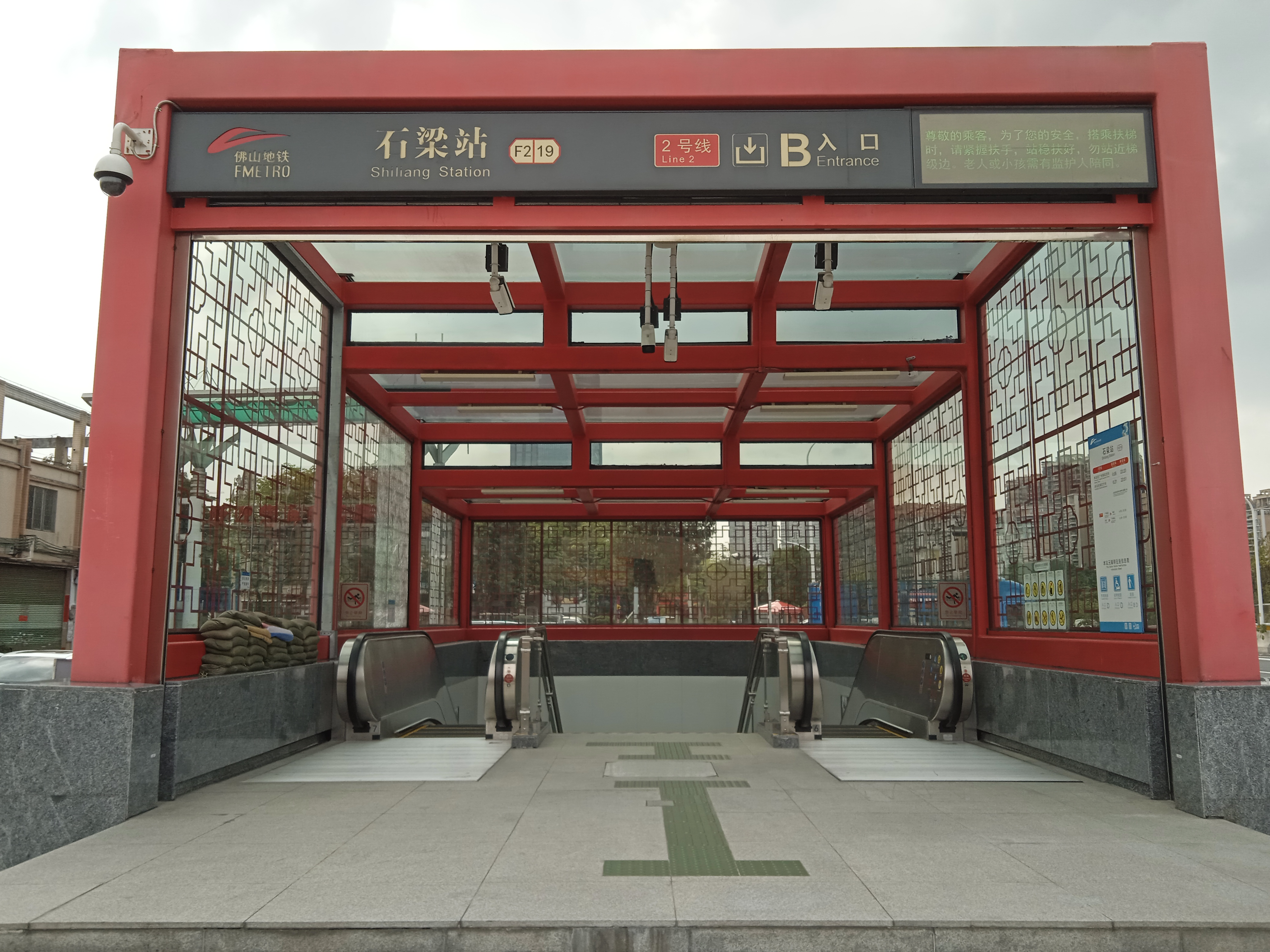
Entrance B

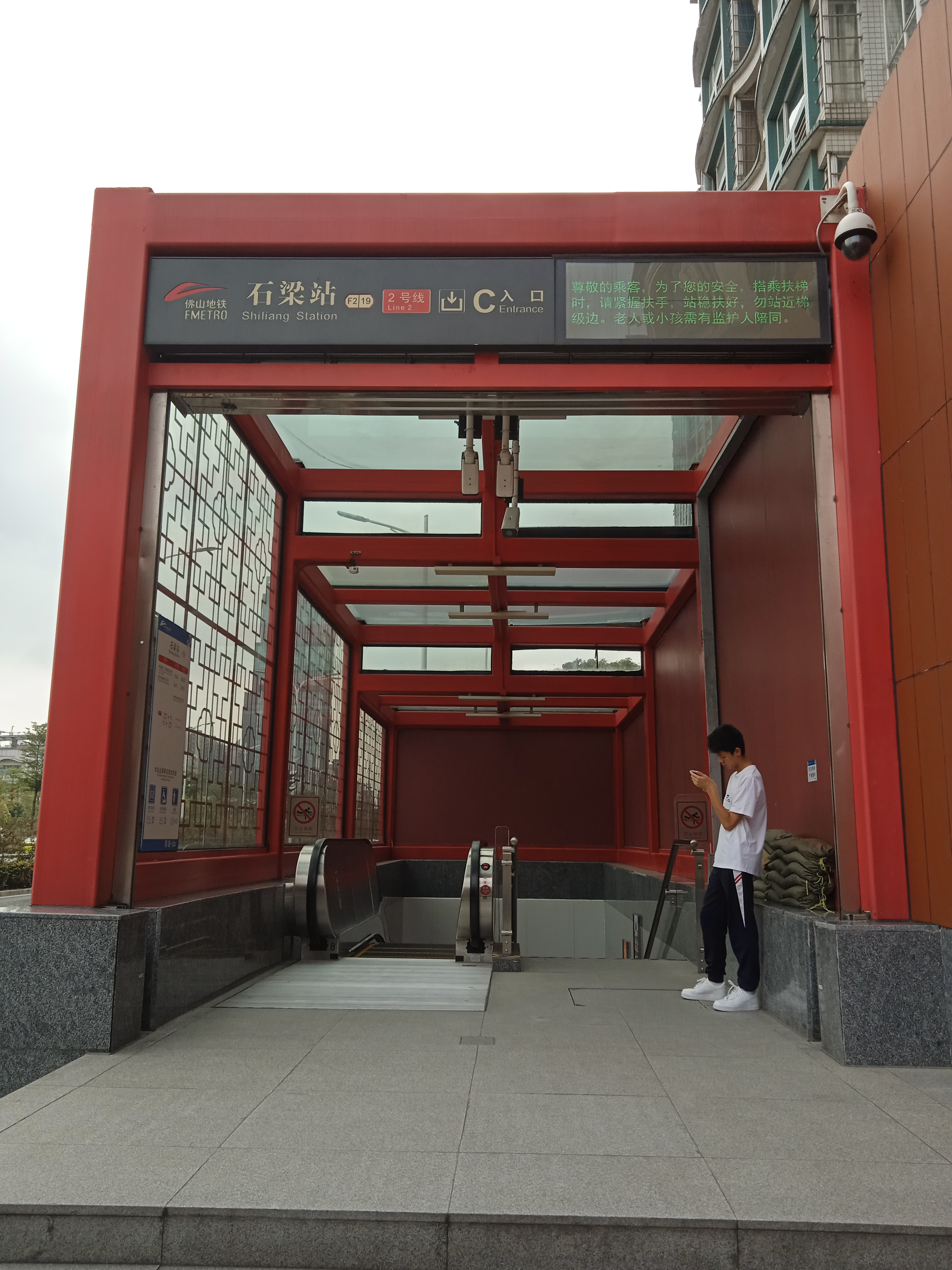
Entrance C

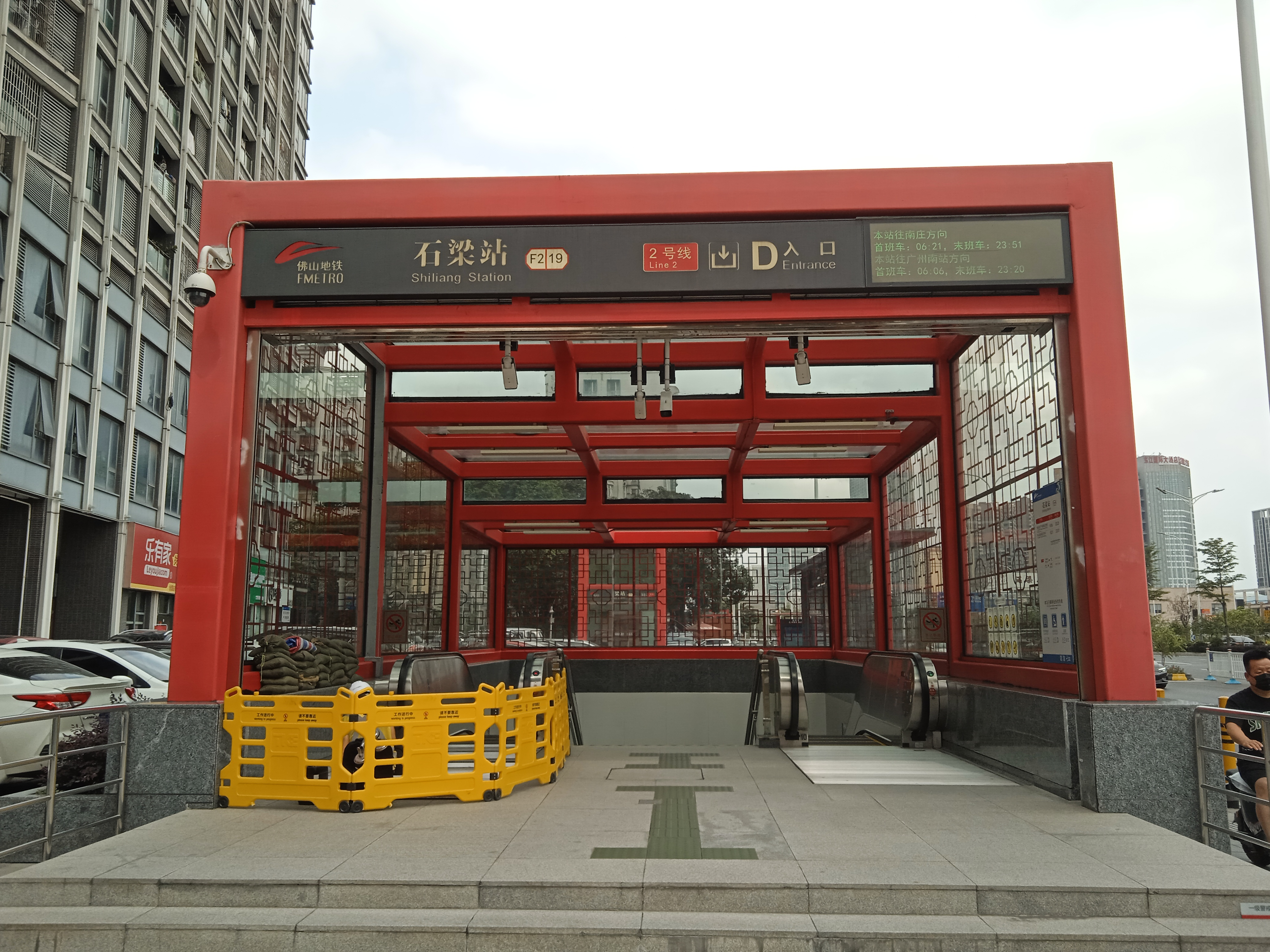
Entrance D
