= Kuiqi Lu station =

Guangfo Metro and Foshan Metro Line 2 station

Kuiqi Lu 魁奇路
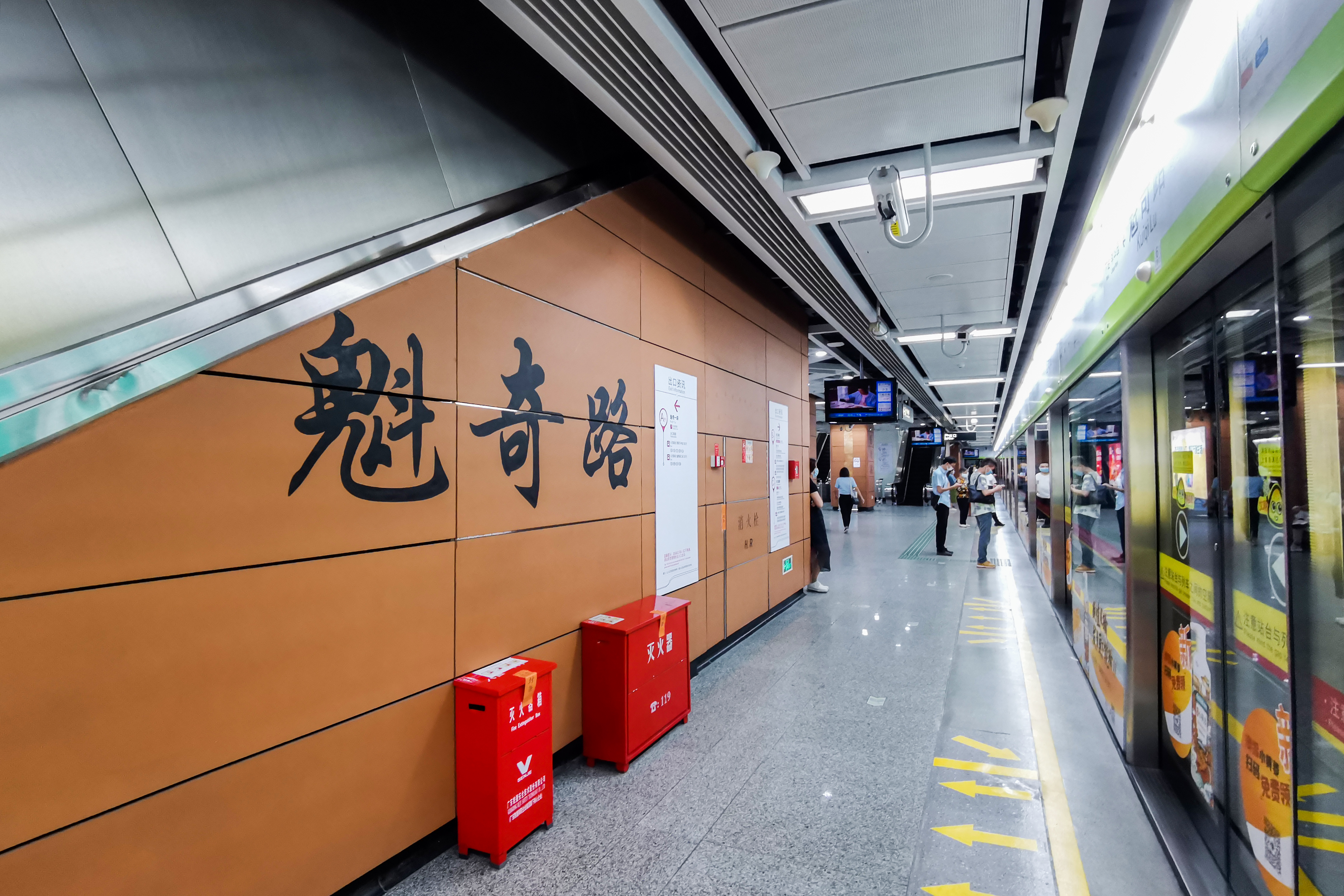
- Platform 1 (Guangfo Line towards Lijiao)

General information
- Location: Chancheng District, Foshan, Guangdong; China
- Coordinates: 22.9940°N 113.1086°E
- Operator: Foshan Railway Investment Construction Group Co. Ltd. Guangzhou Metro Co. Ltd.
- Lines: Guangfo Line; Line 2
- Platforms: 4 (1 island platform and 2 side platforms)
- Tracks: 4

Construction
- Structure type: Underground
- Platform levels: 2
- Accessible: Yes

Other information
- Station code: GF05 F218

History
- Opened: Guangfo Line: 3 November 2010 (15 years ago); Line 2: 28 December 2021 (4 years ago)

Services
Preceding station	Foshan Metro	Following station
Lanshi towards Xincheng Dong	Guangfo Line	Jihua Park towards Lijiao
Shagang towards Nanzhuang	Line 2	Shiliang towards Guangzhou South Railway Station
Location

Kuiqi Lu station (Chinese: 魁奇路站; pinyin: Kuíqí Lù Zhàn; Jyutping: Fui^{1}kei^{4} Lou^{6} Zaam^{6}; lit. 'Kuiqi Road station') is an interchange station between the Guangfo Line (FMetro Line 1) and Line 2 of the Foshan Metro. Trial construction began in 2003 and the main project in 2005. The station is located under the junction of Kuiqi Road (魁奇路) and Fenjiang Road (汾江路) in the Chancheng District of Foshan.

The station is the public transport hub for the Metro, bus services and taxis in Foshan and was completed on 3 November 2010. Line 2 started operations on 28 December 2021.

== Station layout ==
G	-	Exits A, B, C, E
L1; Concourse & Line 2 Platforms	North Lobby	Ticket Machines, Customer Service, Shops, Security Facilities
L1; Concourse & Line 2 Platforms	Side platform, doors will open on the right
L1; Concourse & Line 2 Platforms	Platform 4	2 towards Nanzhuang (Shagang)
L1; Concourse & Line 2 Platforms	Platform 3	2 towards Guangzhou South Railway Station (Shiliang)
L1; Concourse & Line 2 Platforms	Side platform, doors will open on the right
L1; Concourse & Line 2 Platforms	South Lobby	Ticket Machines, Customer Service, Shops, Security Facilities
L2; Guangfo Line Platforms	Platform 2	Guangfo towards Xincheng Dong (Lanshi)
L2; Guangfo Line Platforms	Island platform, doors will open on the left
L2; Guangfo Line Platforms	Platform 1	Guangfo towards Lijiao (Jihua Park)

=== Entrances/exits ===
The station has 4 points of entry/exit. Exit B is equipped with an elevator, and Exit C is equipped with a stairlift.

- A: Fenjiang South Road
- B: Kuiqi 1st Road
- C: Kuiqi 1st Road
- E: Kuiqi 1st Road
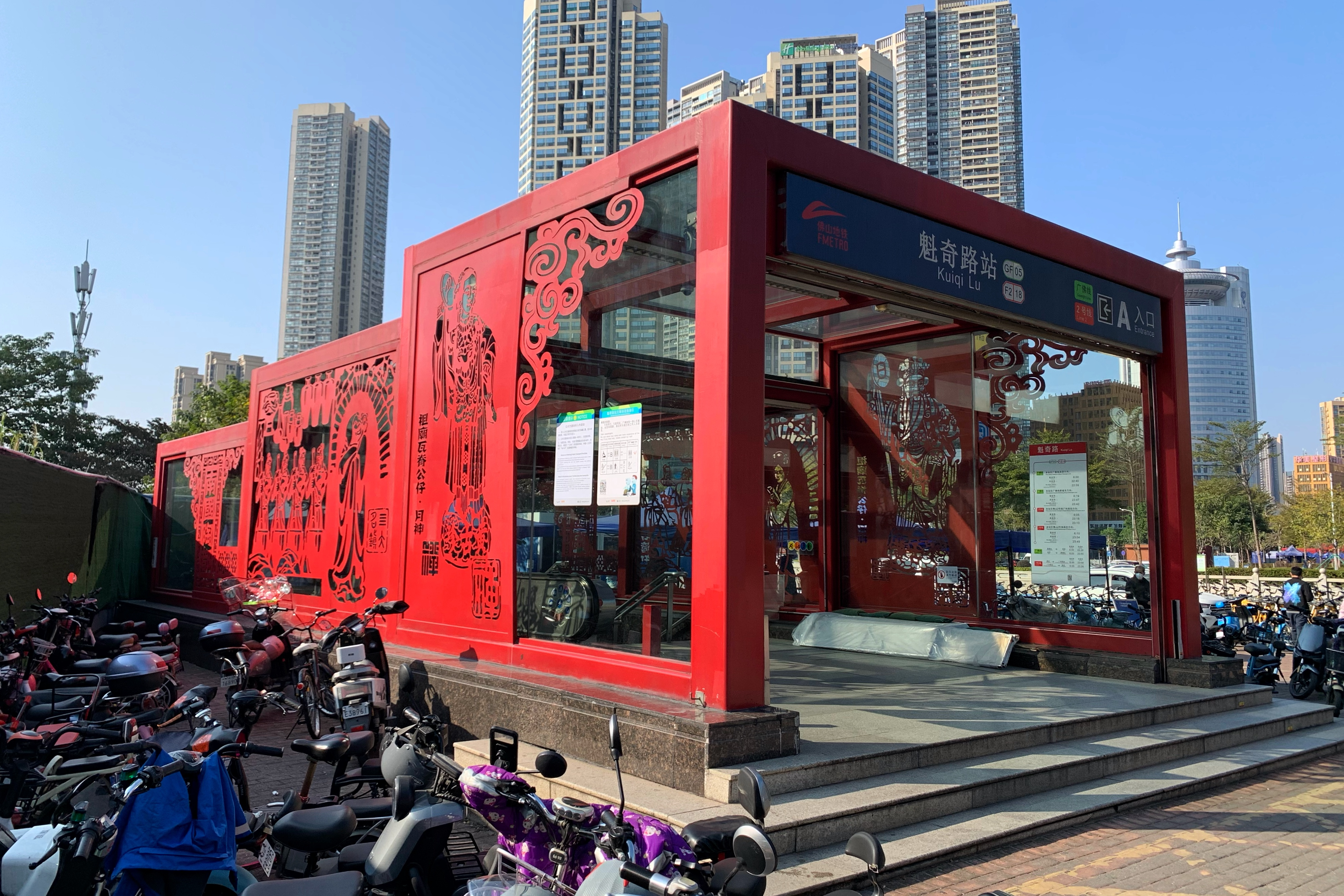
Entrance A

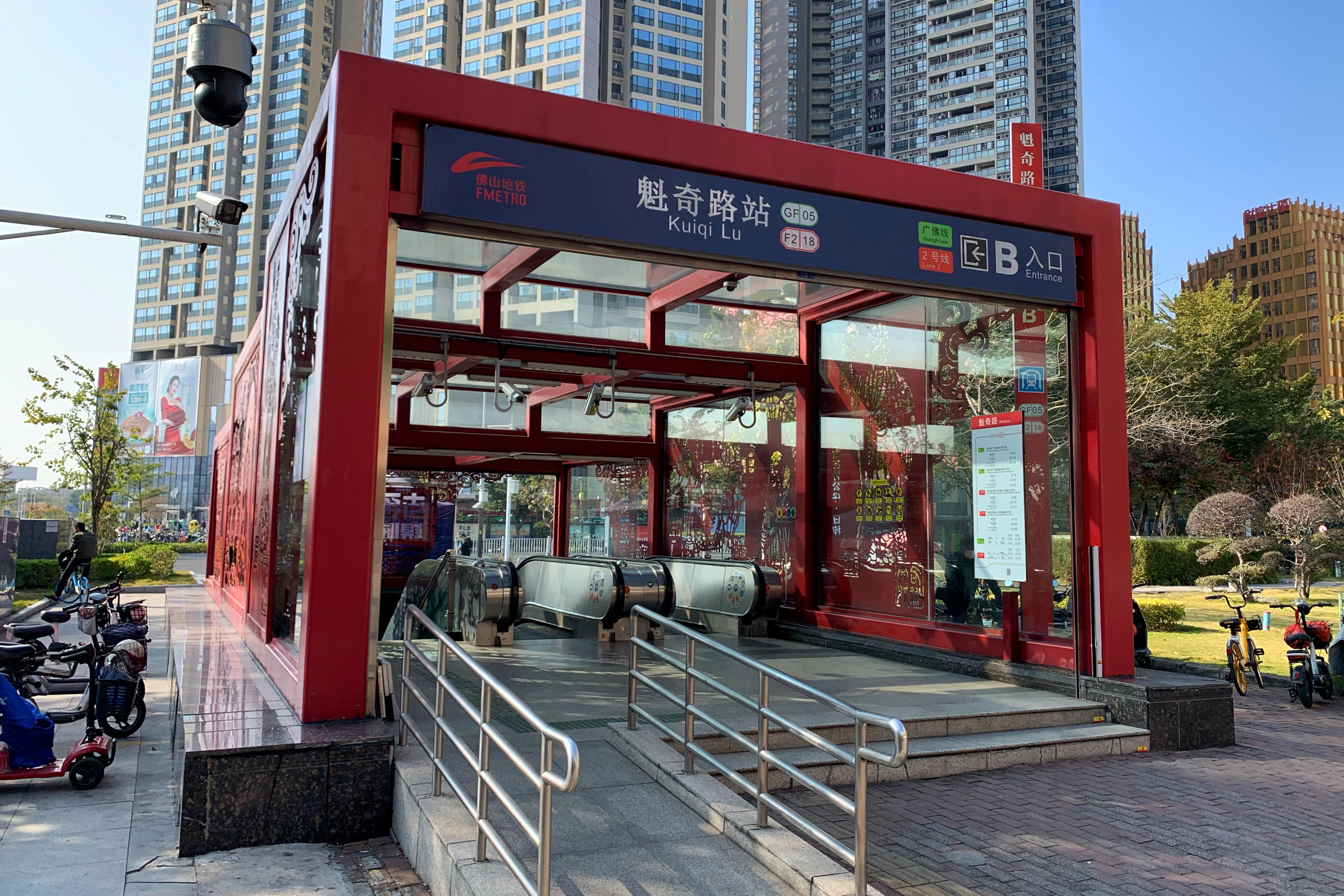
Entrance B

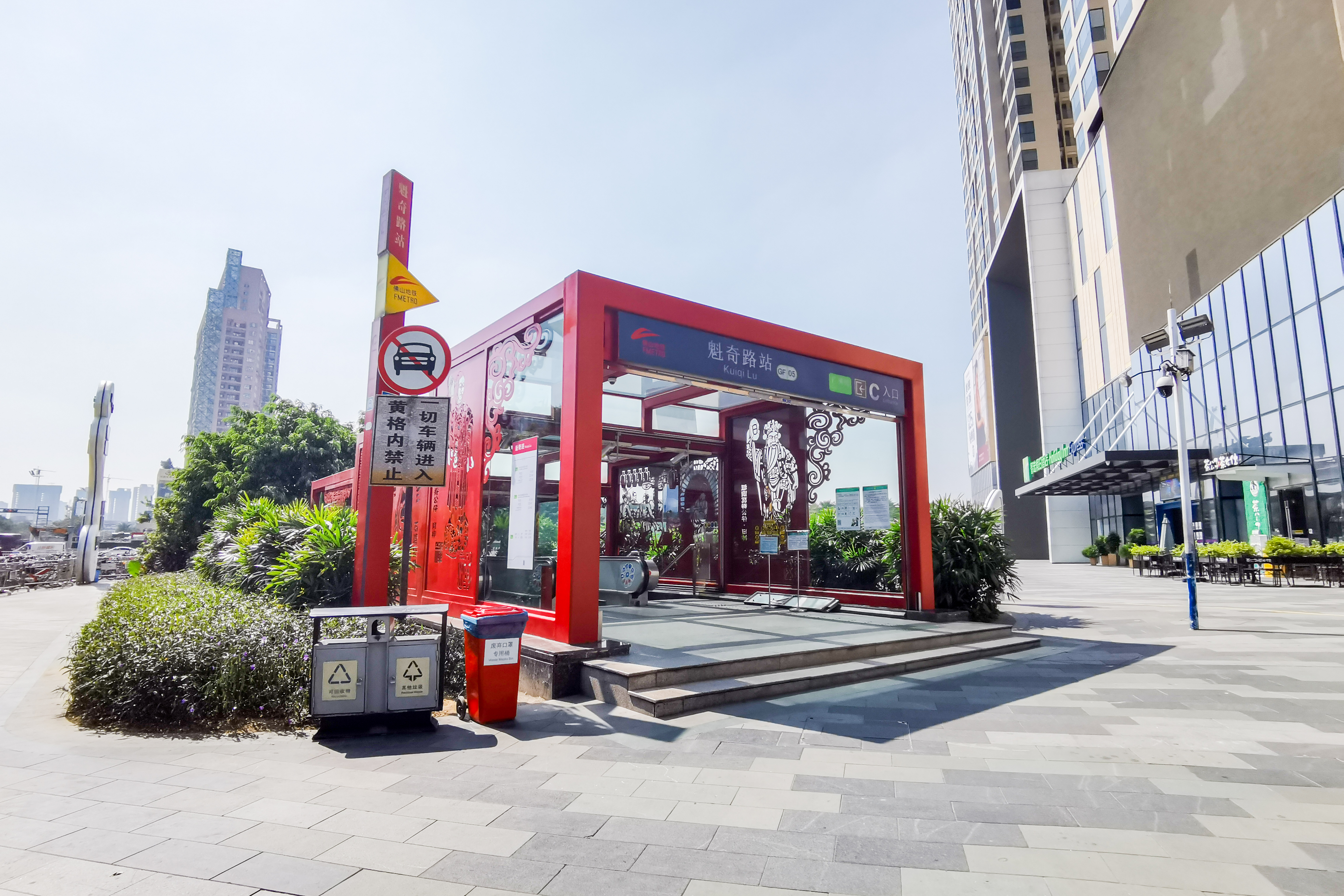
Entrance C

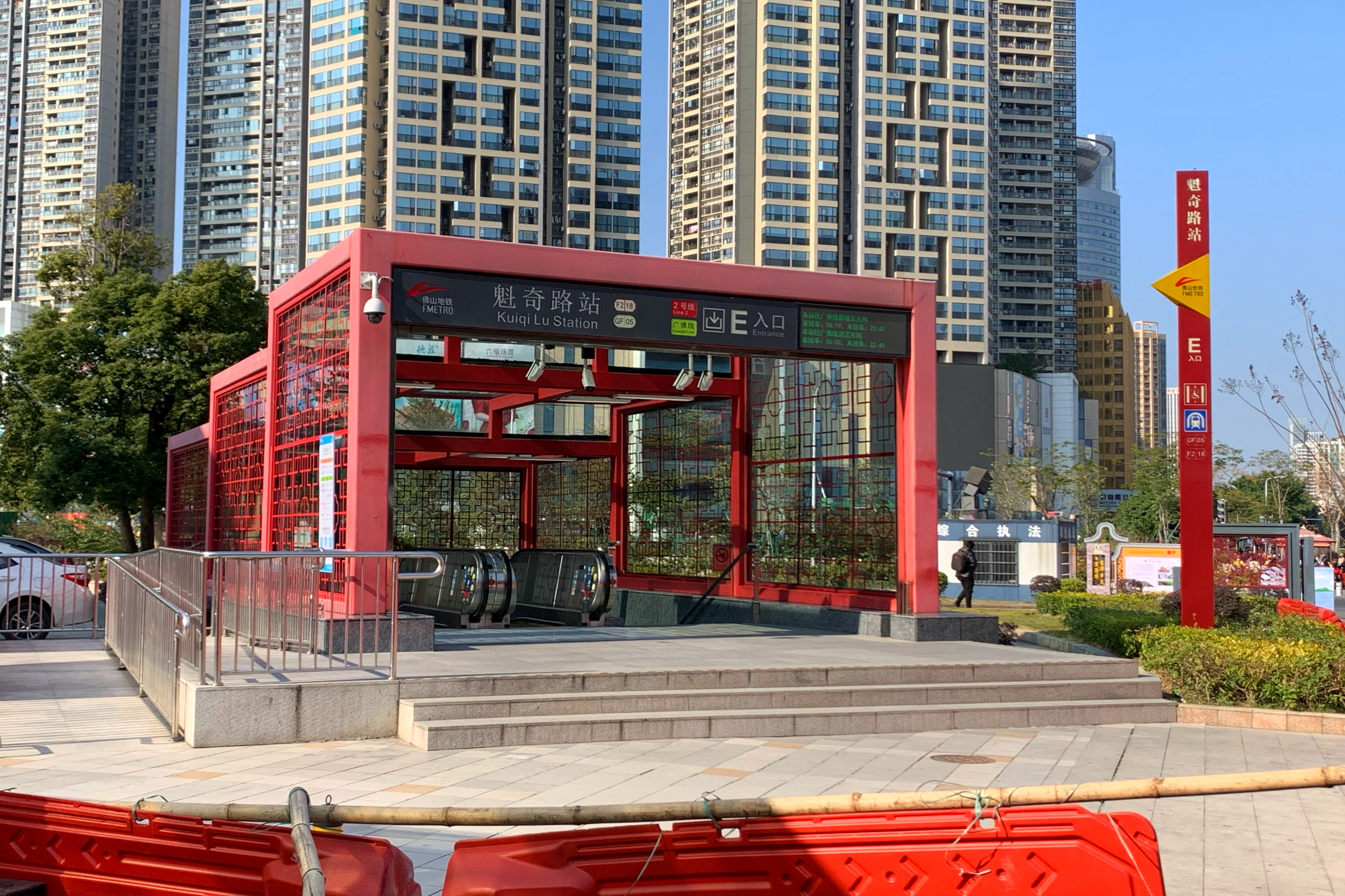
Entrance E

=== Gallery ===
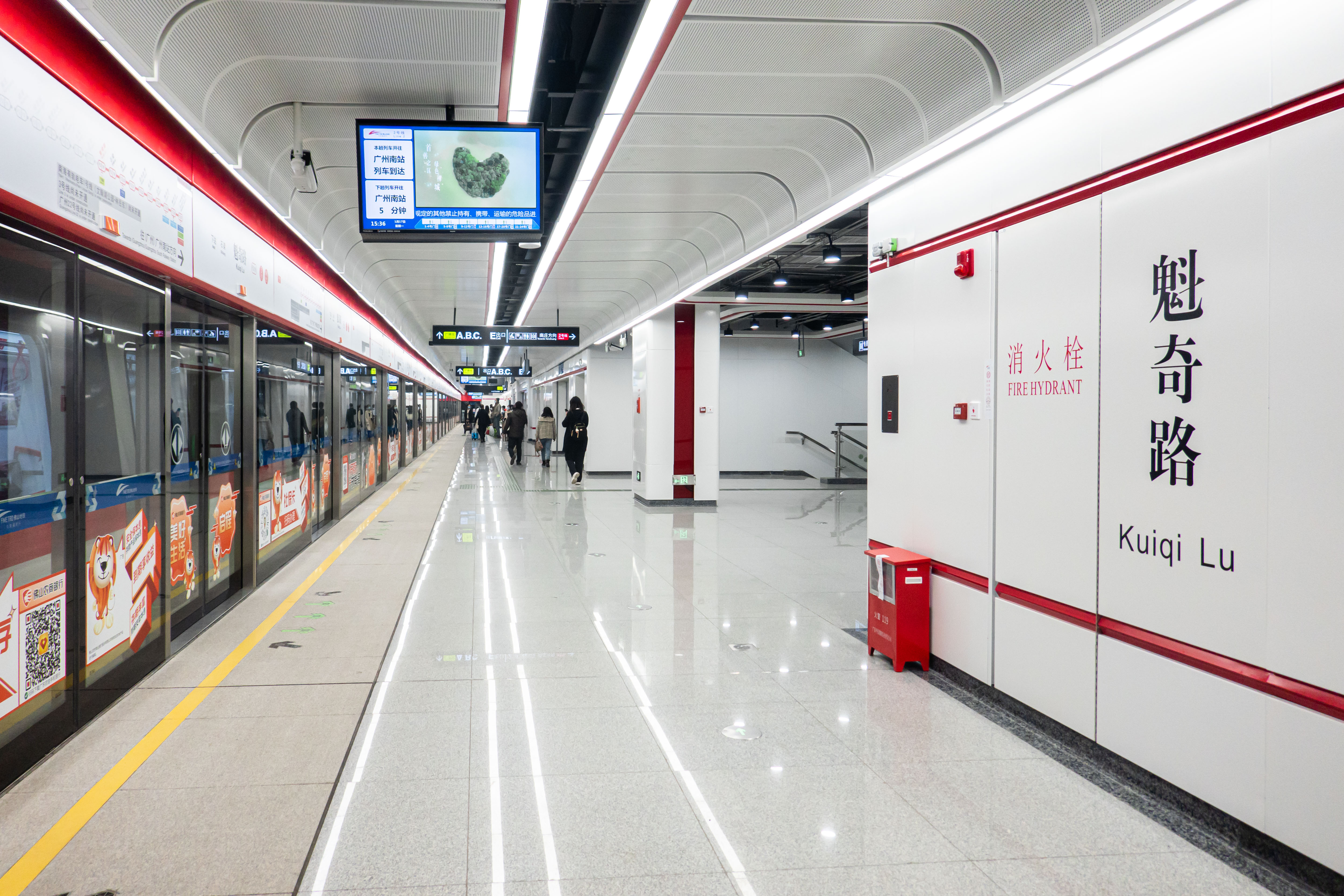
Platform 3 (Line 2 towards Guangzhou South Railway Station)

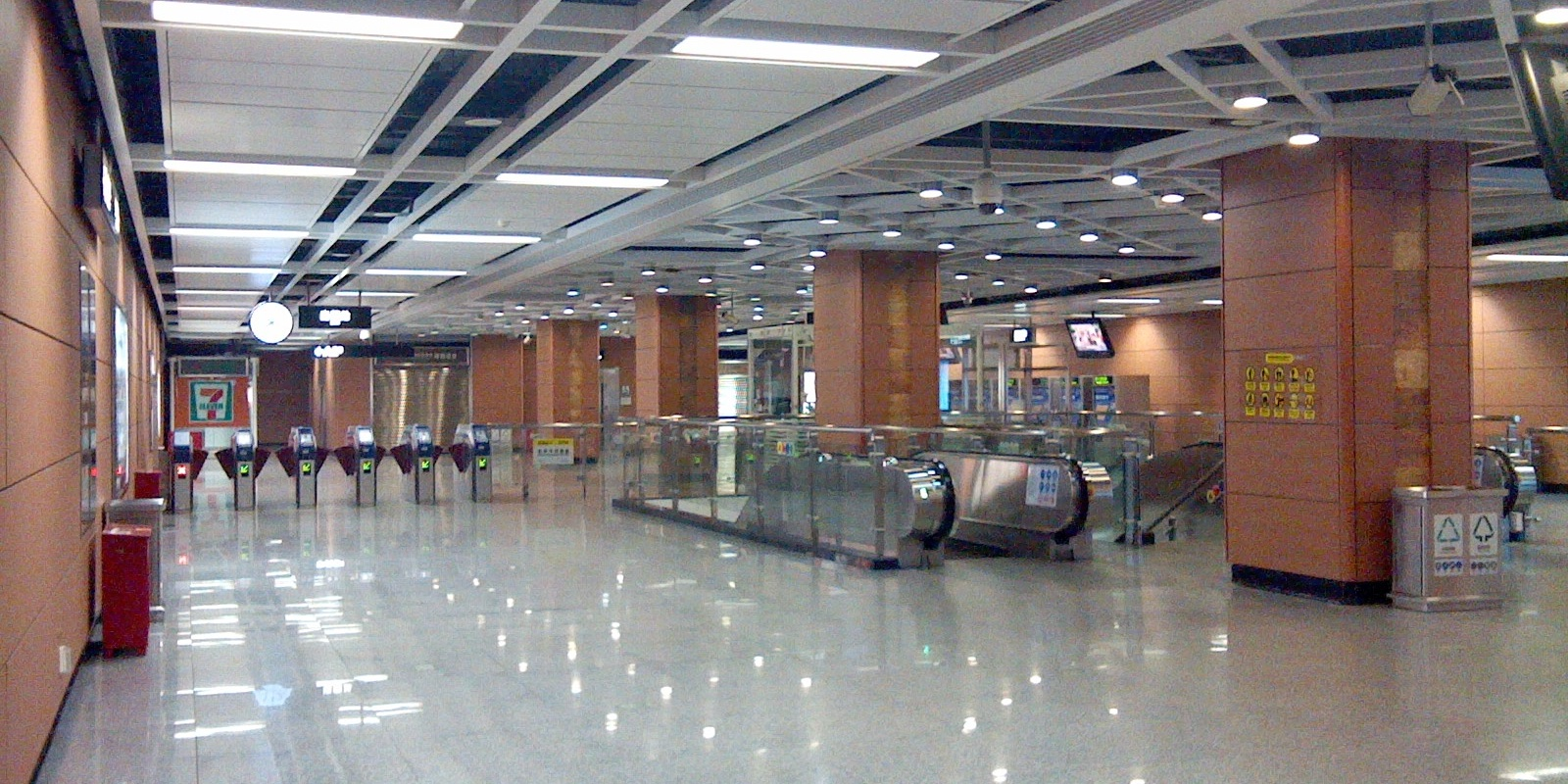
South concourse
