= Shiwanzhen Subdistrict =

Subdistrict of Foshan, China

Coordinates: 23°00′27″N 113°05′52″E

Shiwanzhen Subdistrict (simplified Chinese: 石湾镇街道; traditional Chinese: 石灣鎮街道; pinyin: Shíwānzhèn Jiēdào) is a subdistrict of Chancheng District, located in the southwest of the city of Foshan, Guangdong province, People's Republic of China.

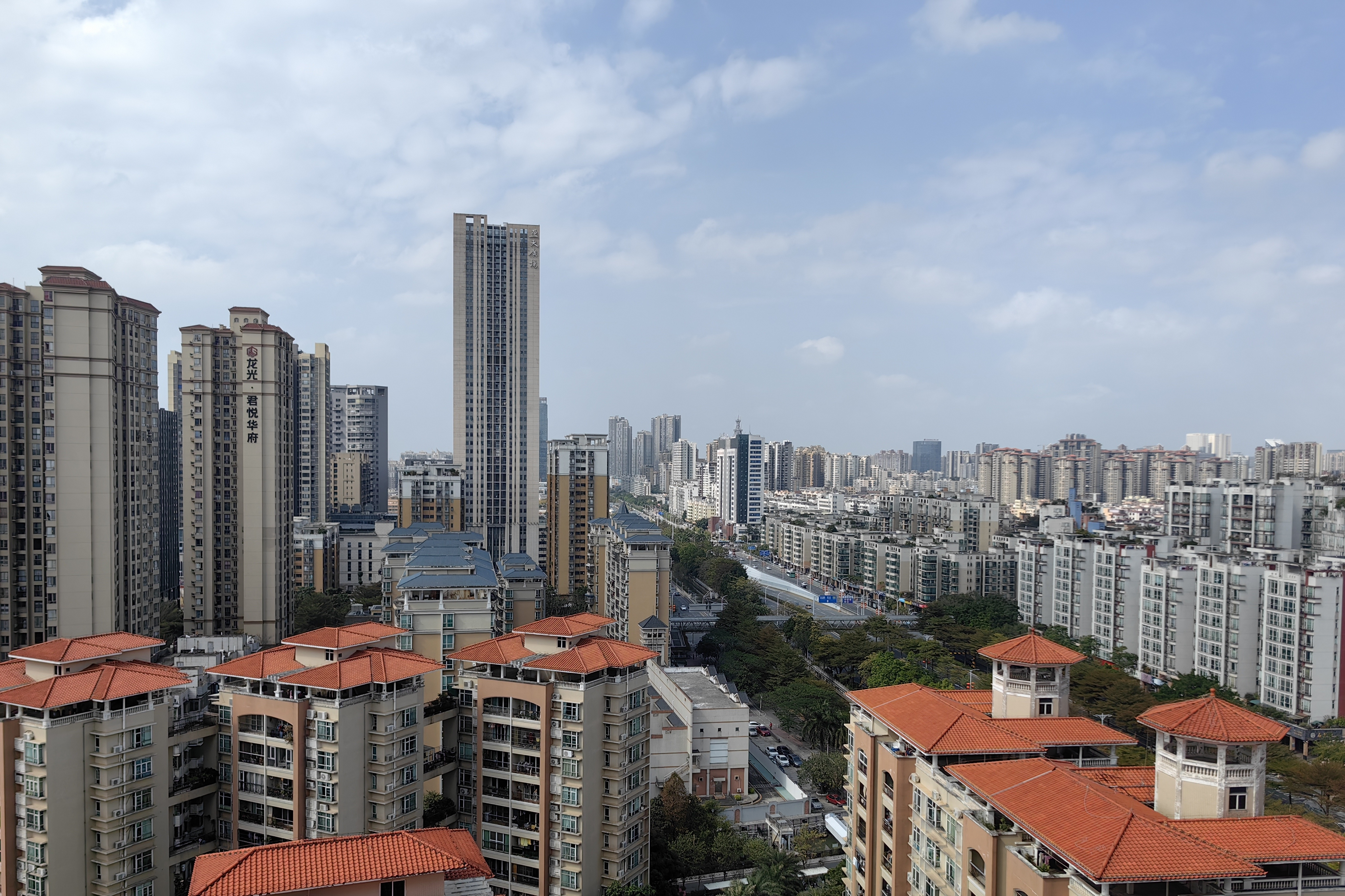
Looking west from the 11th floor of Block A, Lingjun Building

As of June 2022, it has a land area of 28.32 square kilometres (10.93 sq mi) and a population of 384,000.

== Ceramics ==
Shiwan has a long history of ceramic sculpture, with many vivid works by generations of craftsmen. Its 5000-year-long ceramic making history has accumulated the rich and abundant ceramic culture, and won the high prestige of the "Capital of Ceramics in South China".
