= Tanzhou Convention & Exhibition Center station =

Foshan Metro Line 3 station

Tanzhou Convention & Exhibition Center 潭洲会展
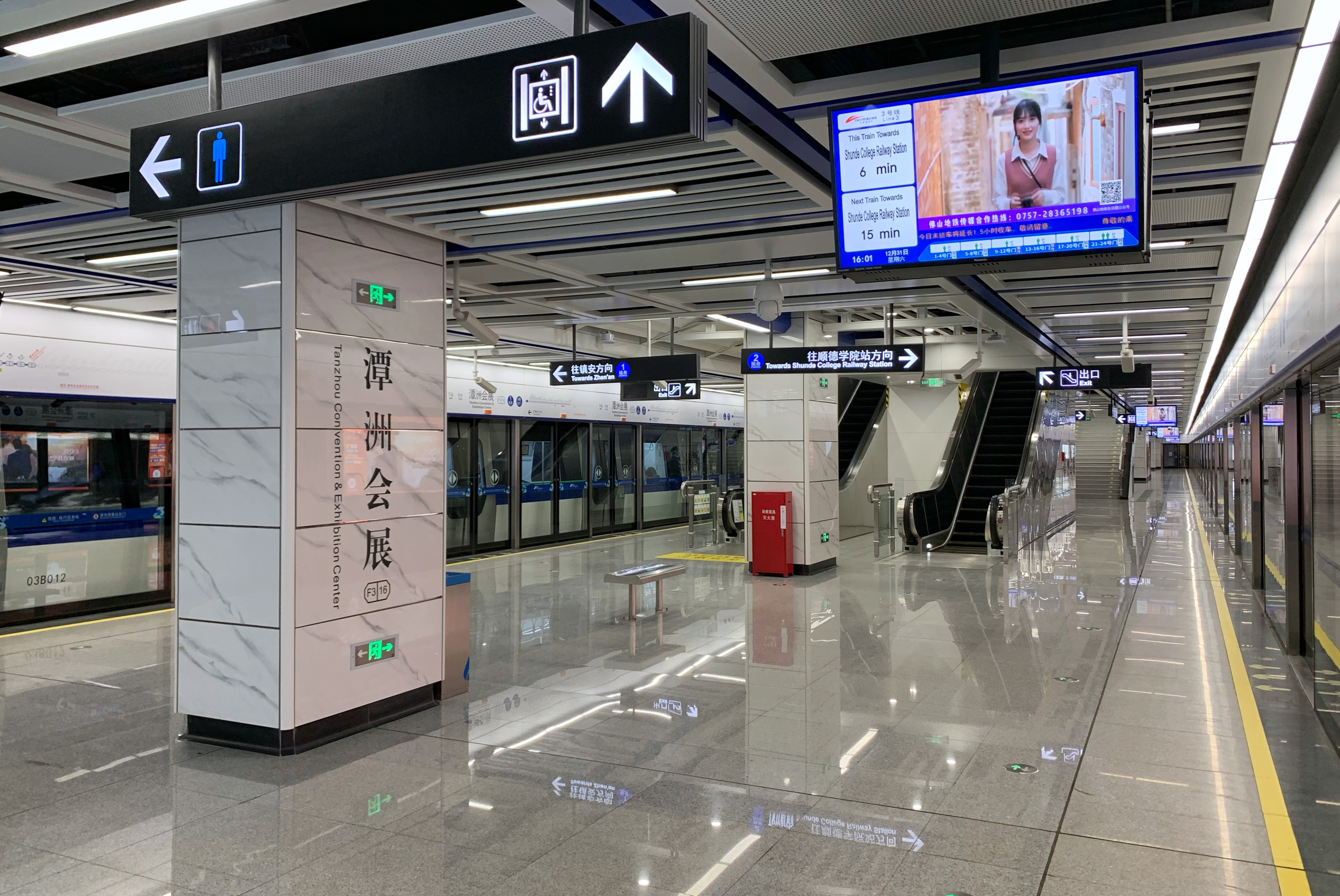
- Platform

Chinese name
- Simplified Chinese: 潭洲会展站
- Traditional Chinese: 潭洲會展站
Transcriptions
Standard Mandarin
- Hanyu Pinyin: Tánzhōu Huìzhǎn Zhàn
Yue: Cantonese
- Yale Romanization: Tàahmjāu Wuihjín Jaahm
- Jyutping: Taam^{4}zau^{1} Wui^{2}zin^{2} Zaam^{6}

General information
- Location: South side of the intersection of Yongxin Road (僚莘路) and Gongzhan Road (工展路), Beijiao; Shunde District, Foshan, Guangdong; China
- Coordinates: 22°57′5″N 113°9′33.41″E
- Operated by: Foshan Metro Operation Co., Ltd.
- Line: Line 3
- Platforms: 2 (1 island platform)
- Tracks: 2

Construction
- Structure type: Underground
- Accessible: Upon request

Other information
- Station code: F316

History
- Opened: 28 December 2022 (3 years ago)
- Previous names: Meiqi (美旗)

Services
Preceding station	Foshan Metro	Following station
Yuebu towards Foshan University	Line 3	Beijiao West Railway Station towards Shunde College Railway Station
Location

Tanzhou Convention & Exhibition Center station (simplified Chinese: 潭洲会展站; traditional Chinese: 潭洲會展站; pinyin: Tánzhōu Huìzhǎn Zhàn; Cantonese Yale: Tàahmjāu Wuihjín Jaahm) is a station on Line 3 of Foshan Metro, located in Foshan's Shunde District. It opened on 28 December 2022.

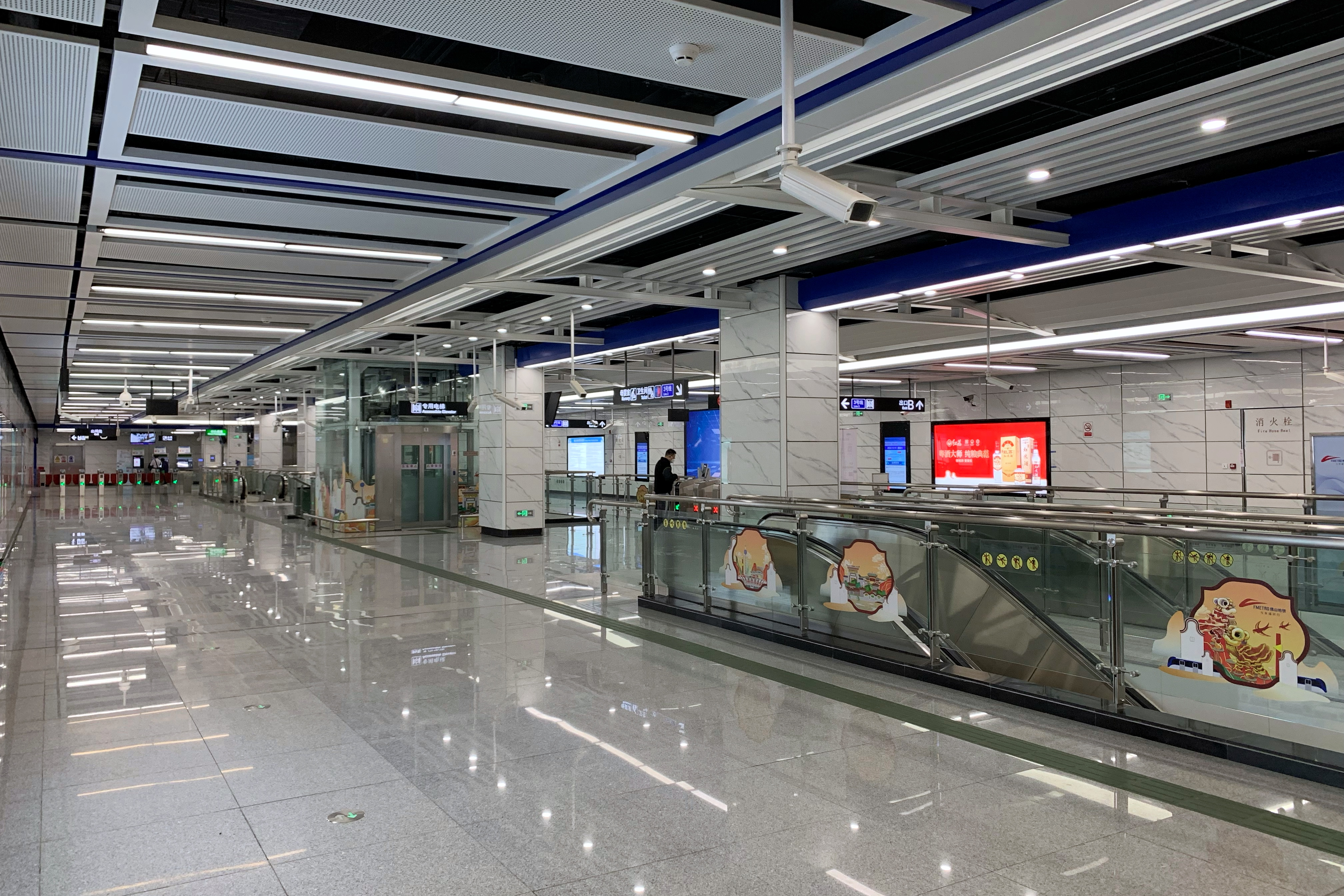
Concourse

== Station layout ==
The station has an island platform under Yongxin Road.

G	-	Exits B & D
L1; Concourse	Lobby	Ticket Machines, Customer Service, Shops, Police Station, Security Facilities
L2; Platforms	Platform 1	3 towards Foshan University (Yuebu)
L2; Platforms	Island platform, doors will open on the left
L2; Platforms	Platform 2	3 towards Shunde College Railway Station (Beijiao West Railway Station)

=== Entrances/exits ===
The station has 2 points of entry/exit, located on the east and west sides of Zhanhe Road. In the future, Exits B2 and C will be implemented. Stairlift access is available upon request, as the station currently has no elevator access to/from street level.

- B: Gongzhan Road, Tanzhou International Convention and Exhibition Center
- D: Zhanhe Road
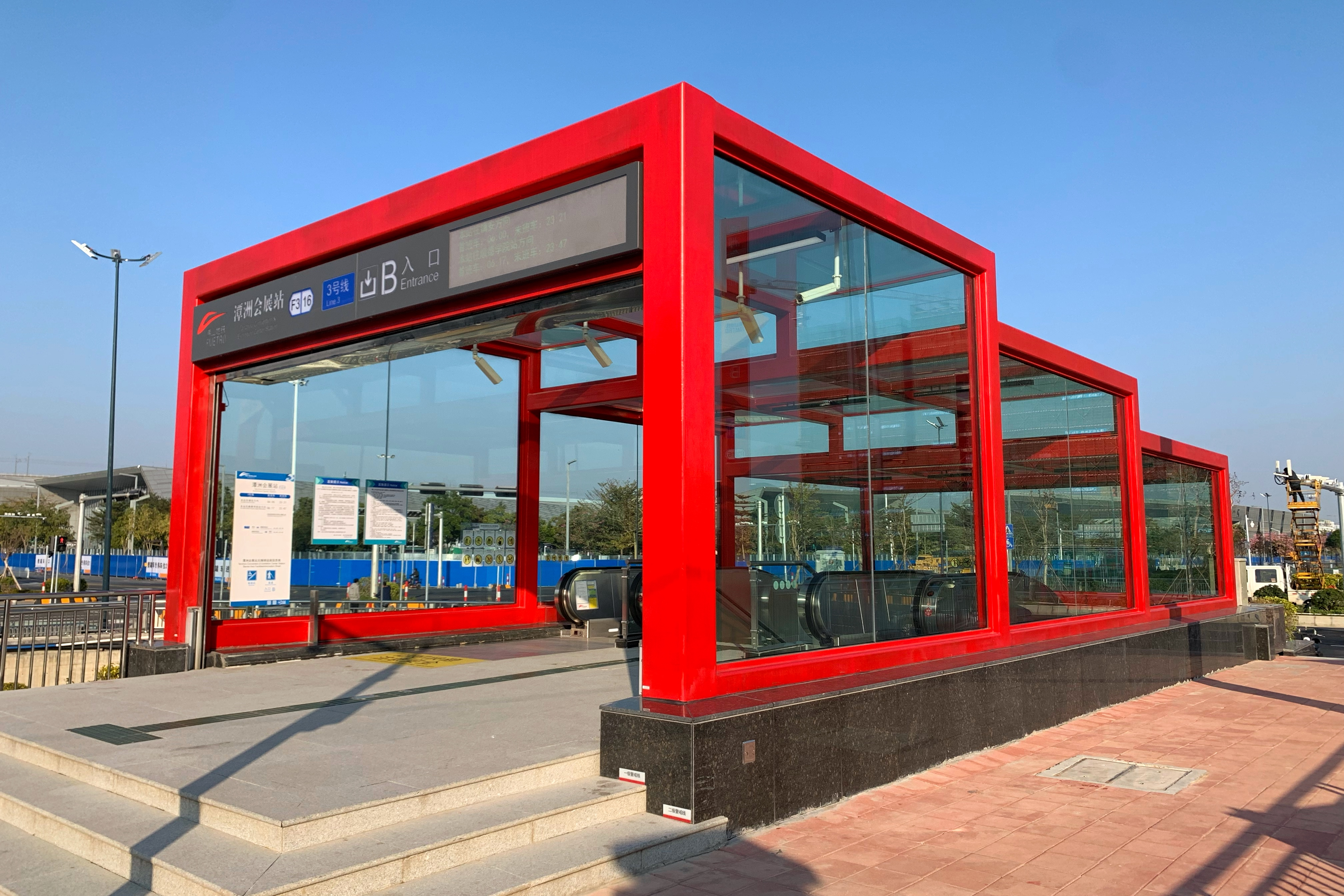
Entrance B

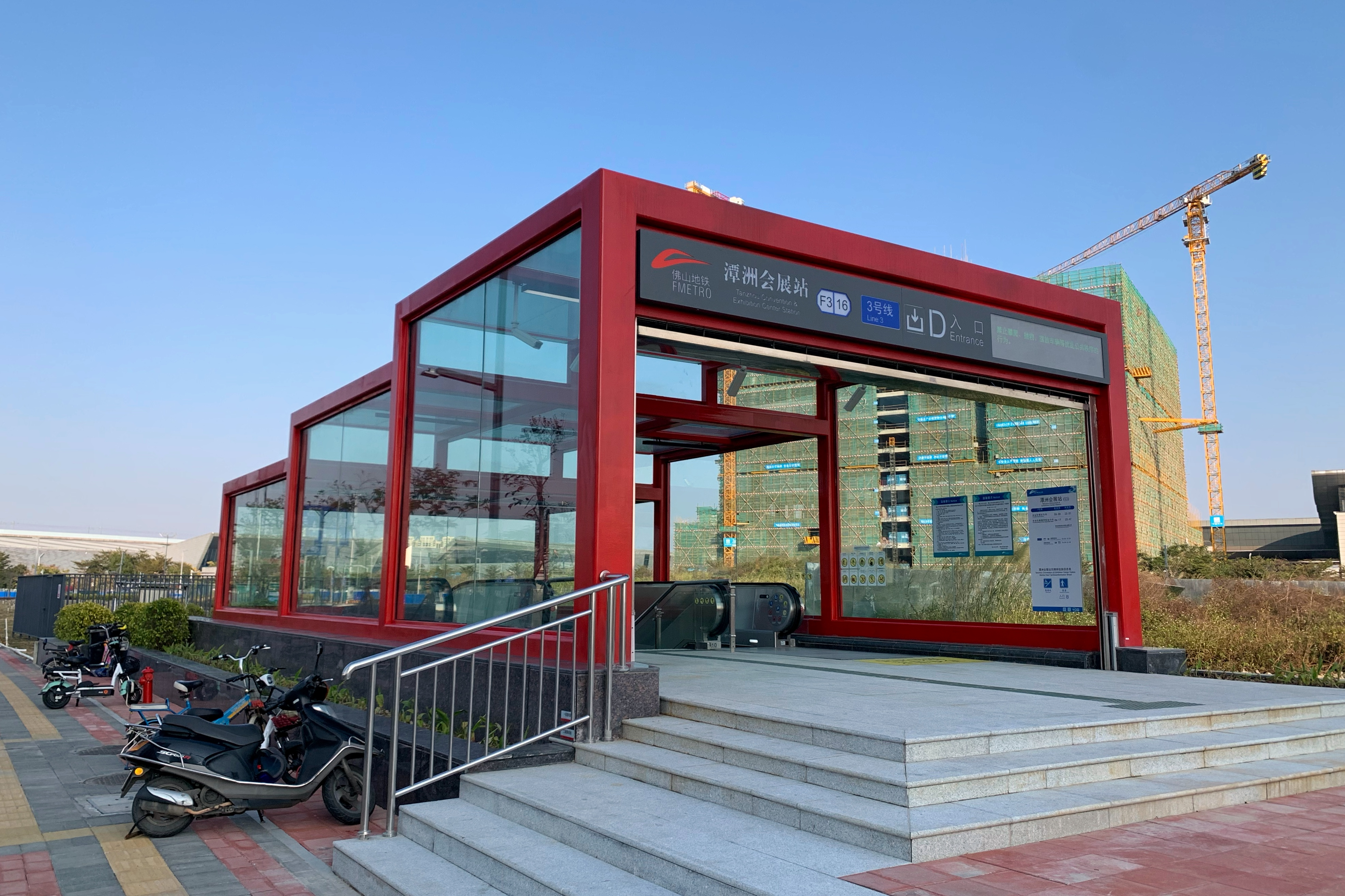
Entrance D

== History ==
The station was called Meiqi station during the planning and construction phase. In 2022, the station was renamed Tanzhou Convention and Exhibition Center station (潭州会展) based on the neighboring Guangdong Tanzhou International Convention and Exhibition Center, but the station name misused the word "state" (州) instead of the "continent" (洲) used by the convention and exhibition center. Later, the Chinese station name was revised with the correct character (潭洲会展).

The station began construction on 18 November 2016. The first diaphragm wall reinforcement cage was successfully hoisted into the pit and poured with concrete on 17 February 2017. The station began excavating in July 2017, and all base slabs were poured on 27 November the same year.

On 6 February 2018, the main structure of the station topped out, making it the first topped out station of Line 3. On 1 August the same year, the double line tunnel from this station to Shuikou station (now Yuebu) broke through. On 15 December the same year, the left and right line tunnels from Beijiao station (now Beijiao West Railway Station) to this station safely passed under the Guangdong Tanzhou International Convention and Exhibition Center.

On 28 December 2022, the station opened with the opening of Line 3.
