= Gaocun station =

Foshan Metro Line 3 station

Gaocun 高村
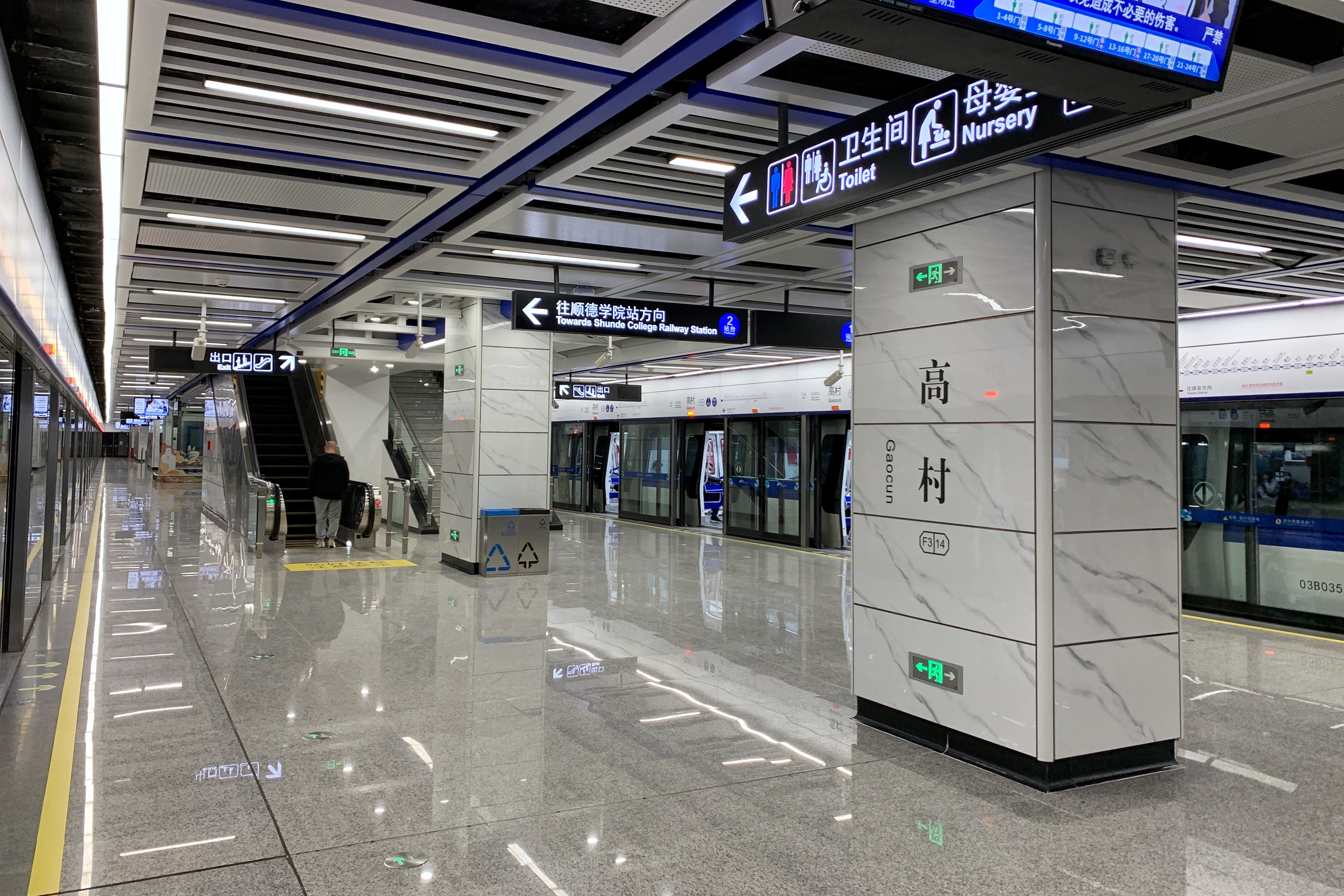
- Platform

Chinese name
- Chinese: 高村站
Transcriptions
Standard Mandarin
- Hanyu Pinyin: Gāocūn Zhàn
Yue: Cantonese
- Yale Romanization: Gōuchyūn Jaahm
- Jyutping: Gou^{1}cyun^{1} Zaam^{6}

General information
- Location: Intersection of Linshang North Road (林上北路) and Gaocun Boulevard (高村大道), Beijiao; Shunde District, Foshan, Guangdong; China
- Coordinates: 22°56′50.96″N 113°11′20.22″E
- Operator: Foshan Metro Operation Co., Ltd.
- Line: Line 3
- Platforms: 2 (1 island platform)
- Tracks: 2

Construction
- Structure type: Underground
- Accessible: Yes

Other information
- Station code: F314

History
- Opened: 28 December 2022 (3 years ago)

Services
Preceding station	Foshan Metro	Following station
Beijiao West Railway Station towards Foshan University	Line 3	Beijiao Park towards Shunde College Railway Station
Location

Gaocun station (Chinese: 高村站; pinyin: Gāocūn Zhàn; Cantonese Yale: Gōuchyūn Jaahm) is a station on Line 3 of Foshan Metro, located in Foshan's Shunde District. It opened on 28 December 2022.

== Station layout ==
The station has an island platform under Linshang Road.

G	-	Exits B, C, D
L1; Concourse	Lobby	Ticket Machines, Customer Service, Shops, Police Station, Security Facilities
L2; Platforms	Platform 1	3 towards Foshan University (Beijiao West Railway Station)
L2; Platforms	Island platform, doors will open on the left
L2; Platforms	Platform 2	3 towards Shunde College Railway Station (Beijiao Park)

=== Platform ===
The station has an island platform located under Linshang Road. In addition, there is a double storage line on the west side of the station, which can be used to turnback for intermediate station terminating trains. At the same time, the track also extends westward into the Beijiao Stabling Yard as an entry and exit line. Some intermediate terminating trains will withdraw from service and return to the Beijiao Stabling Yard after the clearance of passengers on Platform 1. When a typhoon hits and requires the suspension of the open-air section, all trains departing from the north will turnback at this station, serving as the temporary terminus.

=== Entrances/exits ===
The station has 3 points of entry/exit, located on the southeast and northwest sides of Linshang North Road. Exit B is equipped with an elevator.

- B: Linshang North Road
- C: Linshang North Road
- D: Linshang North Road

== History ==
On 11 December 2019, the station topped out. On 29 September 2020, the open-cut section between this station and Beijiao station (now Beijiao West Railway Station metro station) successfully topped out. On 15 January 2021, construction of the station was completed, making it the first completed station on Line 3.

On 29 August 2021, the double line tunnel between this station and Beijiao New Town station (now Beijiao Park station) broke through. On 10 June 2022, the section from this station to Beijiao Park station was short tracked, and the rail laying was completed two days later. On this day, the initial section of Line 3 has completed track laying.

On 28 December 2022, the station opened with the opening of Line 3.
