= Yuebu station =

Foshan Metro Line 3 station

Yuebu 岳步
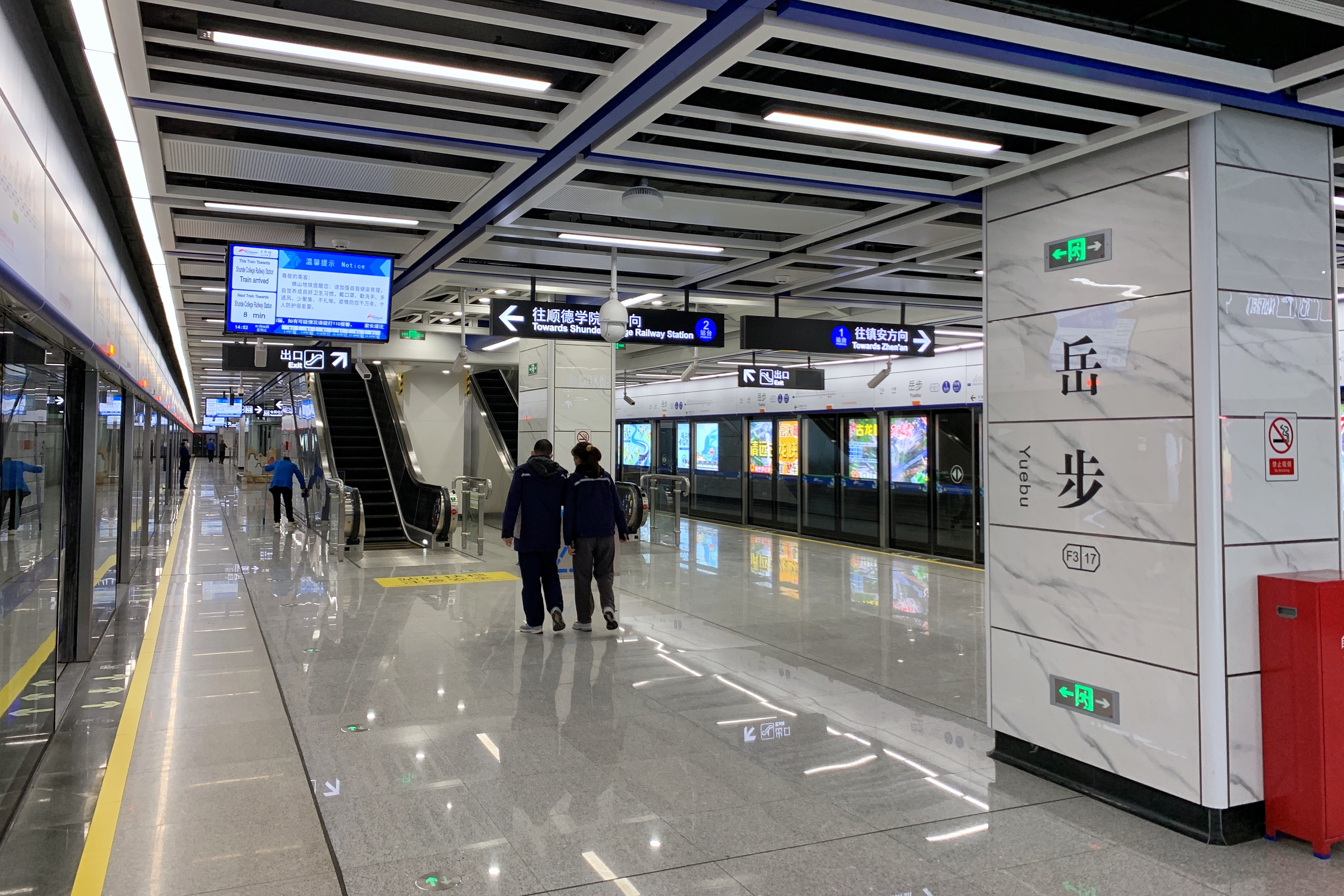
- Platform

Chinese name
- Chinese: 岳步站
Transcriptions
Standard Mandarin
- Hanyu Pinyin: Yuèbù Zhàn
Yue: Cantonese
- Yale Romanization: Ngohkbou Jaahm
- Jyutping: Ngok^{6}bou^{6} Zaam^{6}

General information
- Location: Intersection southwest of Yuebu Estate (岳步村) and northeast of Laoyue Boulevard (劳岳大道), Lecong; Shunde District, Foshan, Guangdong; China
- Coordinates: 22°56′44.27″N 113°8′22.52″E
- Operator: Foshan Metro Operation Co., Ltd.
- Line: Line 3
- Platforms: 2 (1 island platform)
- Tracks: 2

Construction
- Structure type: Underground
- Accessible: Yes

Other information
- Station code: F317

History
- Opened: 28 December 2022 (3 years ago)
- Former names: Shuikou (水口)

Services
Preceding station	Foshan Metro	Following station
Dadun towards Foshan University	Line 3	Tanzhou Convention & Exhibition Center towards Shunde College Railway Station
Location

Yuebu station (Chinese: 岳步站; pinyin: Yuèbù Zhàn; Cantonese Yale: Ngohkbou Jaahm) is a station on Line 3 of Foshan Metro, located in Foshan's Shunde District. It opened on 28 December 2022.

== Station layout ==
The station has an island platform under Yingui Road.

G	-	Exits A & C
L1; Concourse	Lobby	Ticket Machines, Customer Service, Shops, Police Station, Security Facilities
L2; Platforms	Platform 1	3 towards Foshan University (Dadun)
L2; Platforms	Island platform, doors will open on the left
L2; Platforms	Platform 2	3 towards Shunde College Railway Station (Tanzhou Convention & Exhibition Center)

=== Entrances/exits ===
The station has 2 points of entry/exit. Exit A is equipped with an elevator.

- A: Yingui Road
- C: Yingui Road

== History ==
The station was called Shuikou station during the planning and construction phase. On 18 November 2016, the station officially started construction. In July 2018, the main structure topped out. On 9 May 2020, the station began mechanical and electrical construction. In 2022, the station was renamed to Yuebu station, and completed the "three rights" transfer on 30 May. On 28 December the same year, the station opened with the opening of Line 3.
