= Beijiao West railway station =

Railway station in Shunde, Guangdong

Beijiaoxi 北滘西站
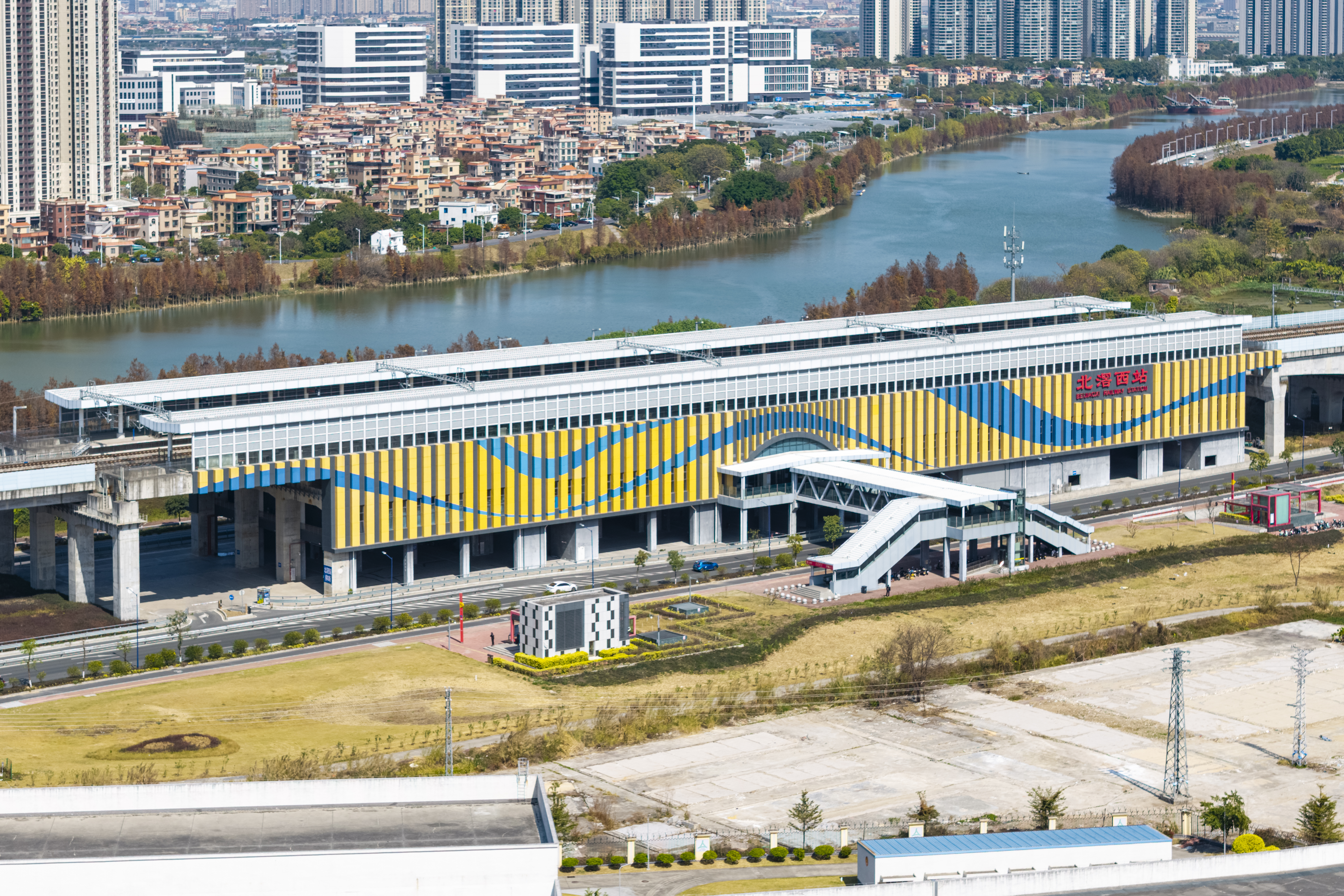
- Exterior

Chinese name
- Chinese: 北滘西站
Transcriptions
Standard Mandarin
- Hanyu Pinyin: Běijiàoxī Zhàn
Yue: Cantonese
- Yale Romanization: Bākgaau Sāi Jaahm
- Jyutping: Bak^{1}gaau^{3} Sai^{1} Zaam^{6}

General information
- Location: Beijiao Town; Shunde District, Foshan, Guangdong; China
- Coordinates: 22°57′18.58″N 113°10′22.04″E
- Owner: Pearl River Delta Metropolitan Region intercity railway
- Operator: Guangdong Intercity
- Lines: Guangzhou–Foshan circular intercity railway (Southern Ring section); Guangzhou–Zhaoqing intercity railway
- Platforms: 2 (2 side platforms)
- Tracks: 4
- Connections: 3 Beijiao West Railway Station

Construction
- Structure type: Elevated
- Accessible: Yes

Other information
- Station code: BJA (Pinyin: BJX)

History
- Opened: 26 May 2024 (2 years ago)

Services
Preceding station	Pearl River Delta Metropolitan Region Intercity Railway	Following station
Shunde North towards Zhaoqing	Guangzhou–Zhaoqing intercity railway	Chencun towards Panyu
Location

Beijiao West railway station (Chinese: 北滘西站; pinyin: Běijiàoxī Zhàn; Cantonese Yale: Bākgaau Sāi Jaahm) is a railway station in Shunde District, Guangdong, China, located near Tanzhou Convention and Exhibition Center. The station opened on 26 May 2024, and is operated by Guangdong Intercity Railway Operation Co., Ltd.

== Features ==
The station is an elevated three-storey side platformed station, with the first floor being the surface parking lot, the second floor being the concourse, and the third floor being the platform floor, and there are overpasses on the north and south sides of the station. The façade of the station building adopts yellow stripes and sky blue waves, showing creativity and vitality; The interior design combines diamond and hexagonal elements to highlight the sense of modern technology.

== Interchanges ==
The station connects to Beijiao West Railway Station, a nearby metro station served by Line 3 of Foshan Metro, via an out-of-station interchange (OSI).

== Entrances/exits ==
The station has 4 points of entry/exit on its north and south side. Currently, only Exits B1 and B2 on the south side are open. Both exits are accessible via elevators.

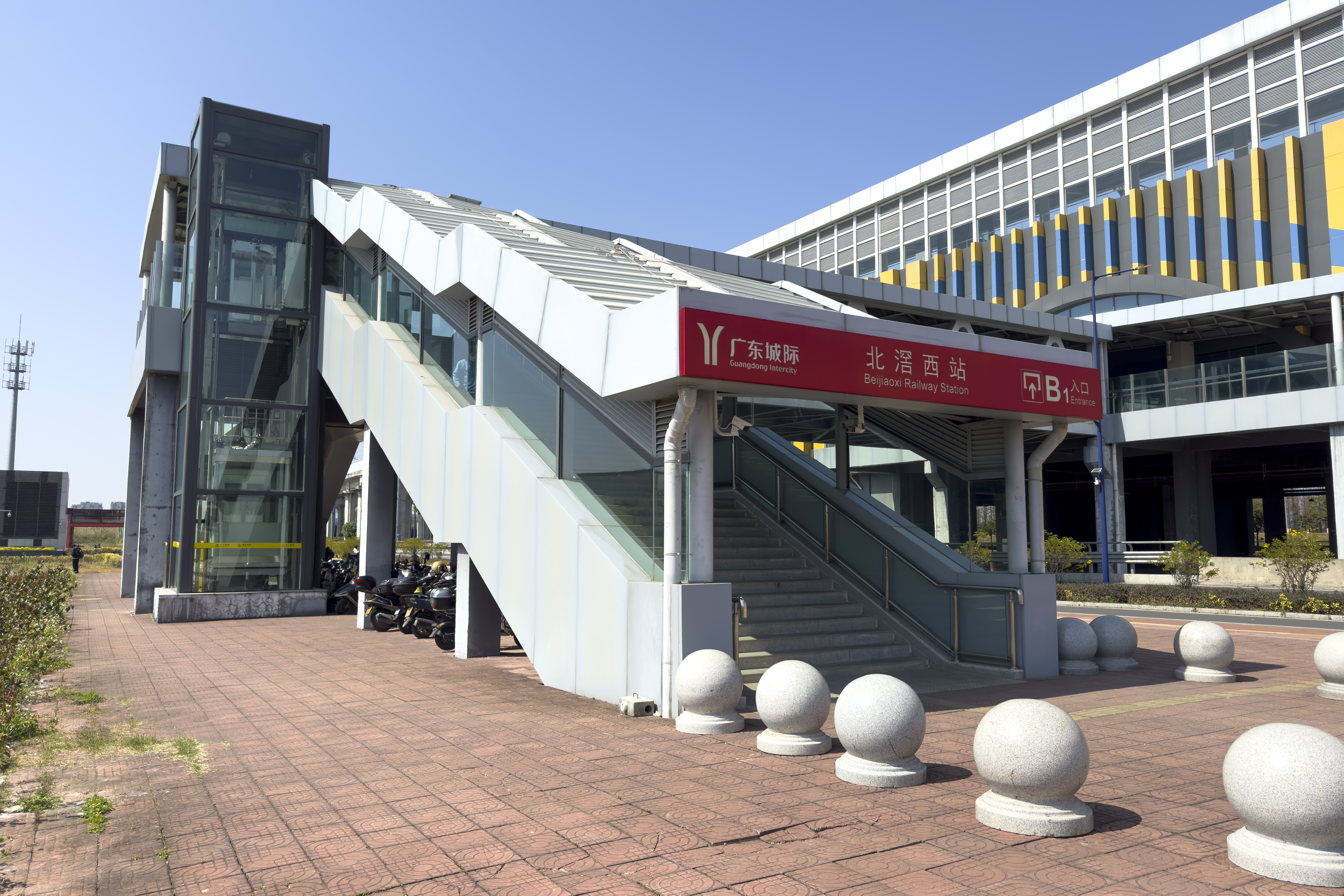
Entrance B1

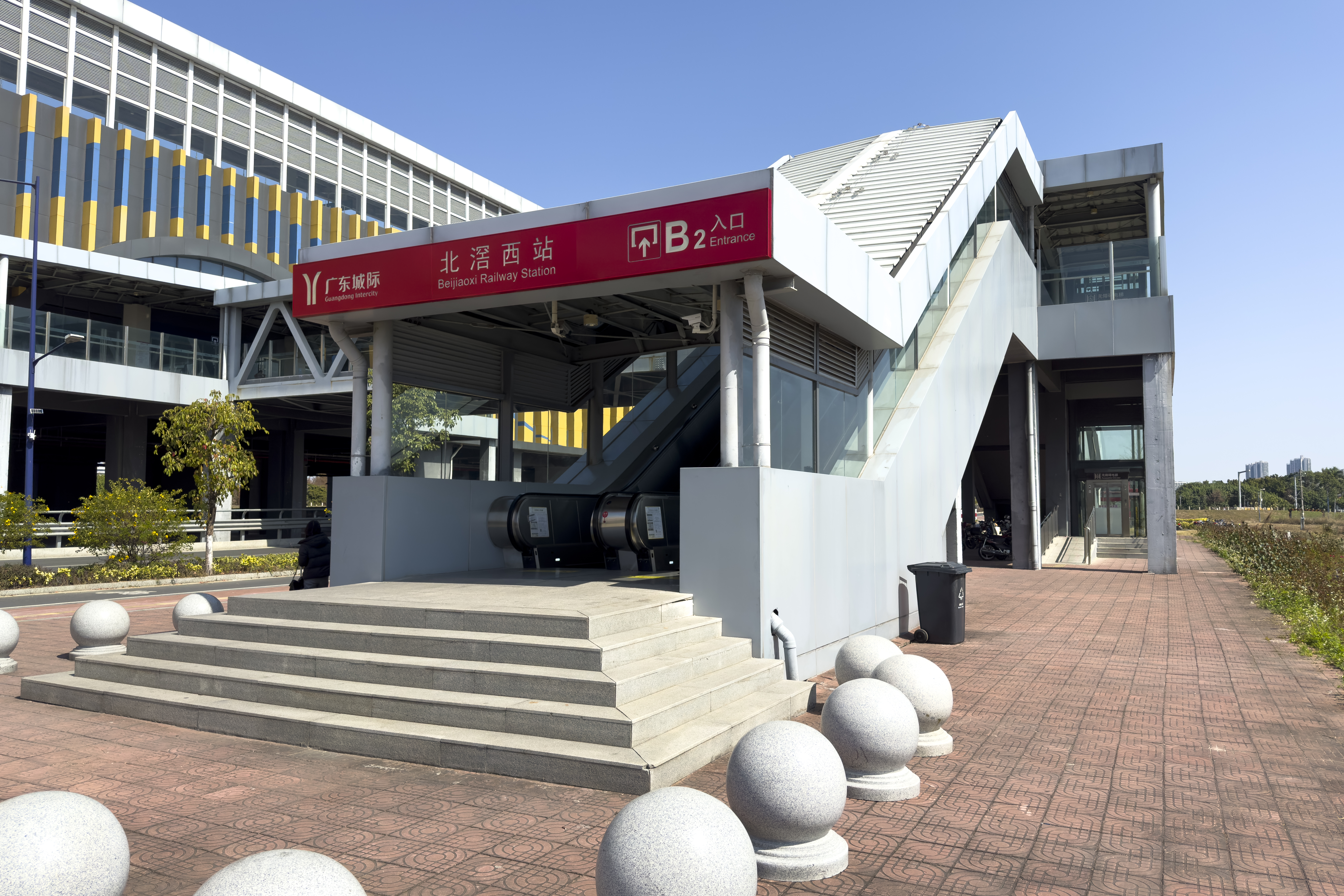
Entrance B2

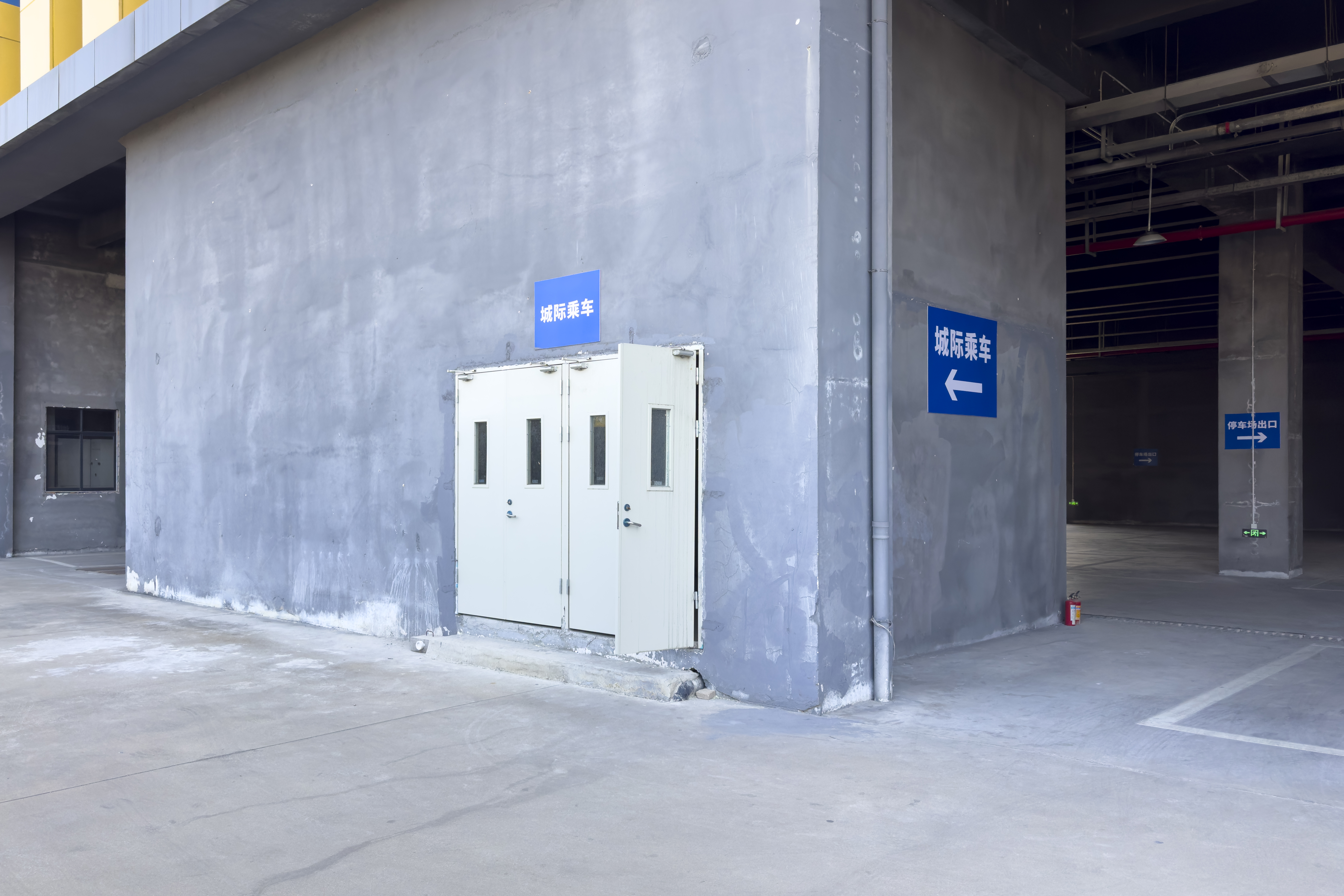
Exit to parking area

== Incident ==
At about 8:50 a.m. on May 29, 2019, the steel roof of the station hall floor of the station collapsed, resulting in injuries to 7 workers who were carrying out waterproof layer construction on the roof, and a direct economic loss of about 2 million yuan. According to the post-investigation report, the design value of the permanent load of the roof of the station hall is 1.45kN/m smaller than the actual permanent load, resulting in the bearing capacity and deformation of the roof steel girder, steel girder assembly node, and steel purlin cannot meet the requirements of the current standard for structural safety, and it is only in an unstable state that may collapse at any time under the action of its own weight, and the collapse eventually occurs due to the construction of the roof waterproof layer.

== Gallery ==
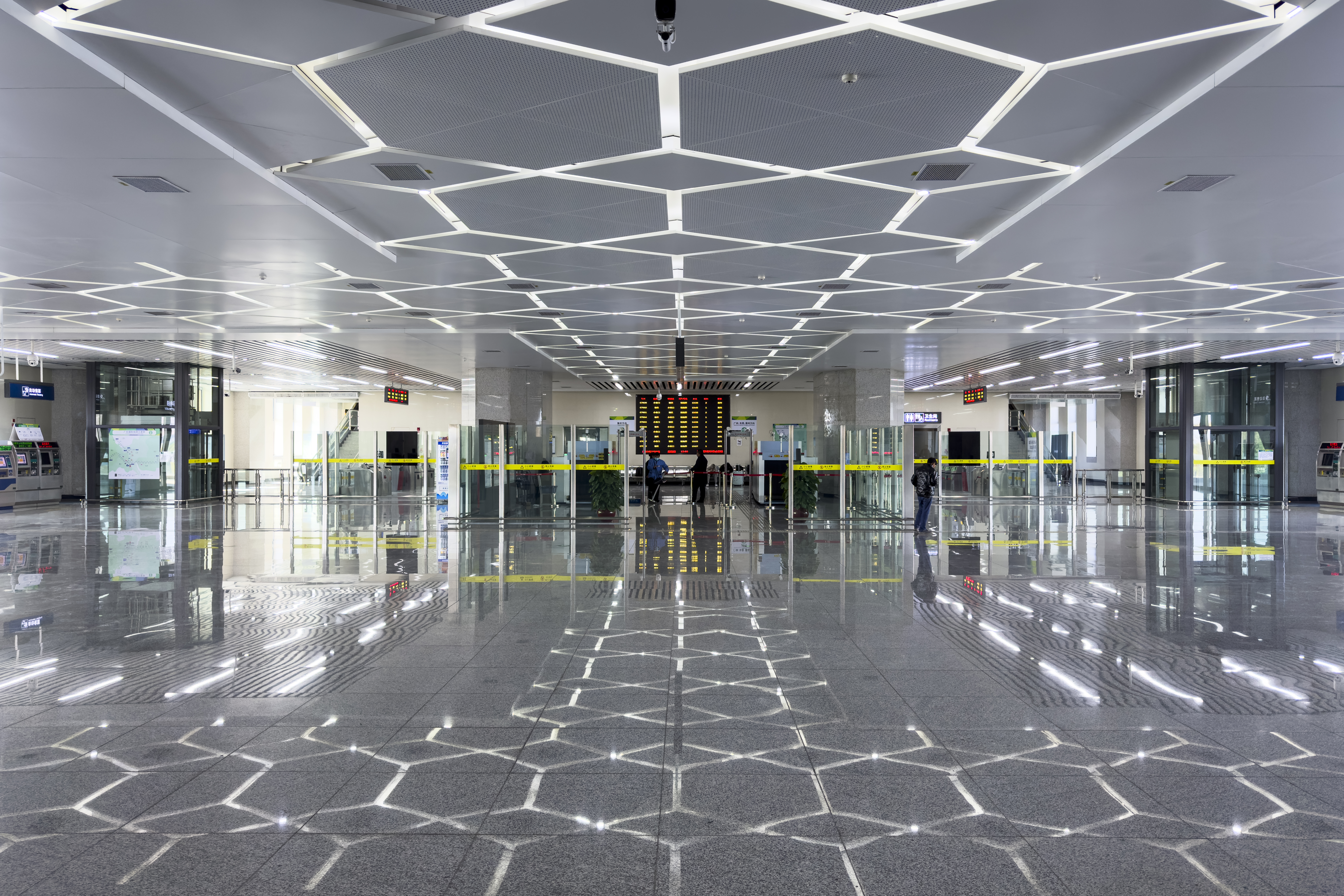
Concourse

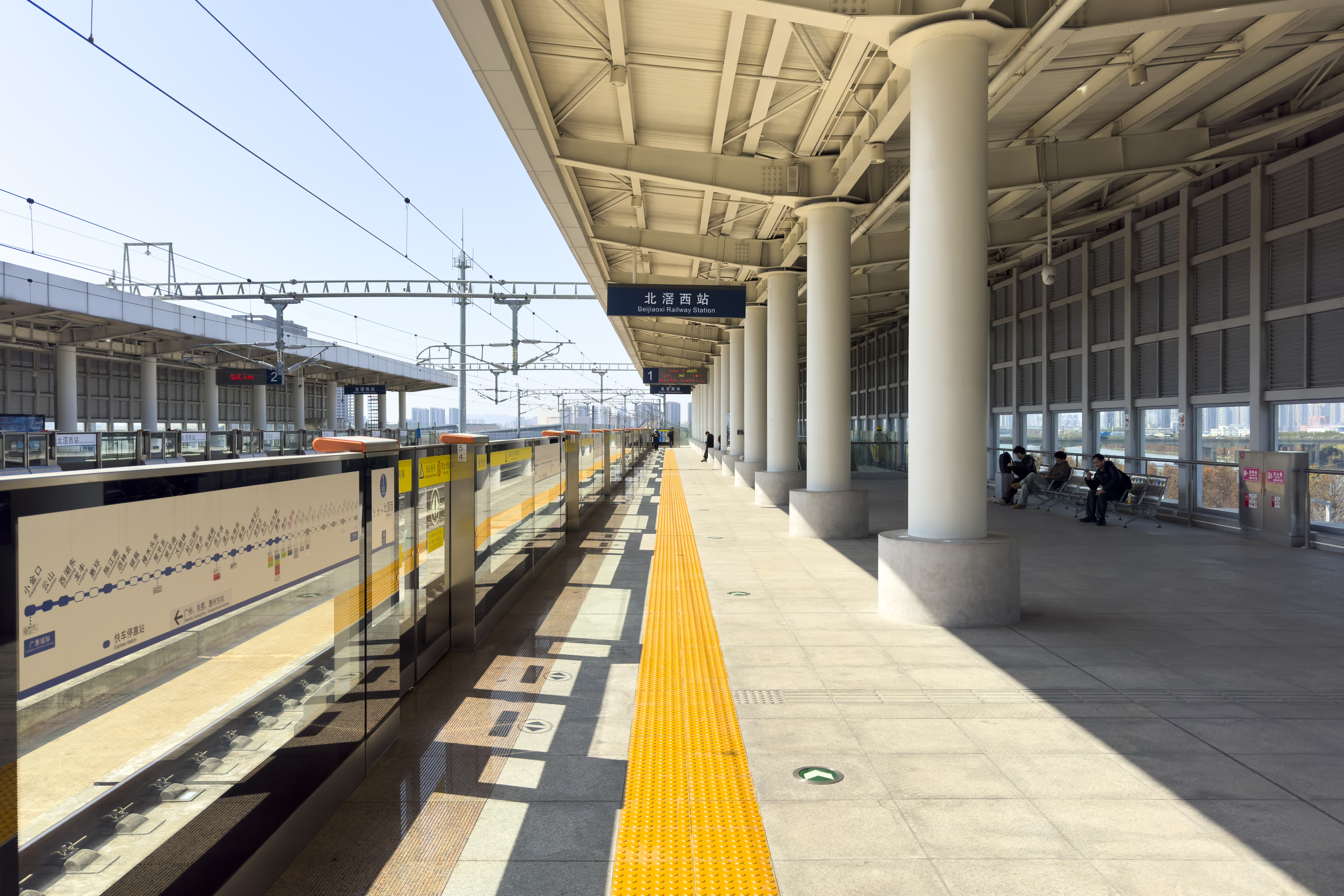
Platform 1

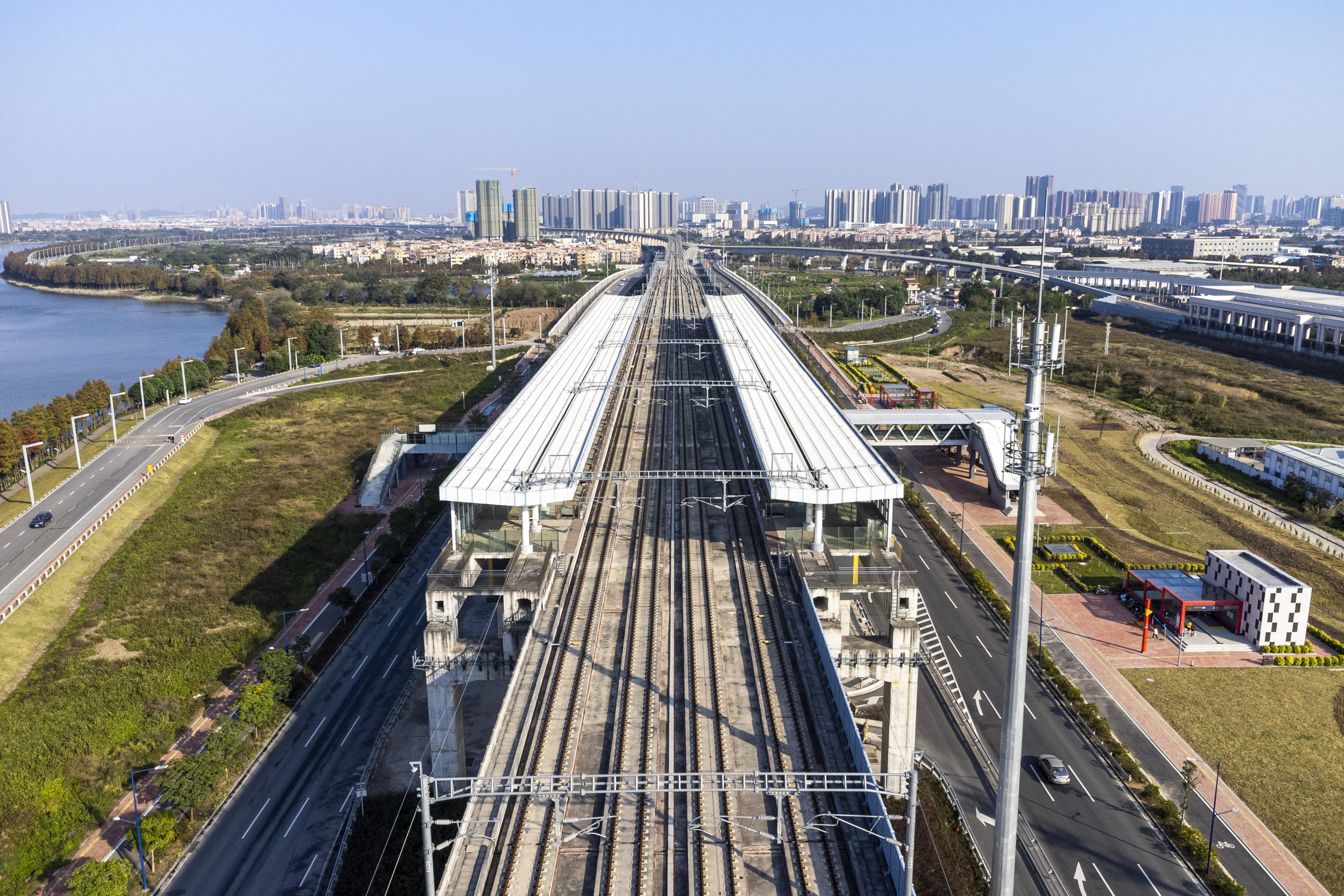
View above the tracks
