= Dadun station =

Foshan Metro Line 3 station

Dadun 大墩
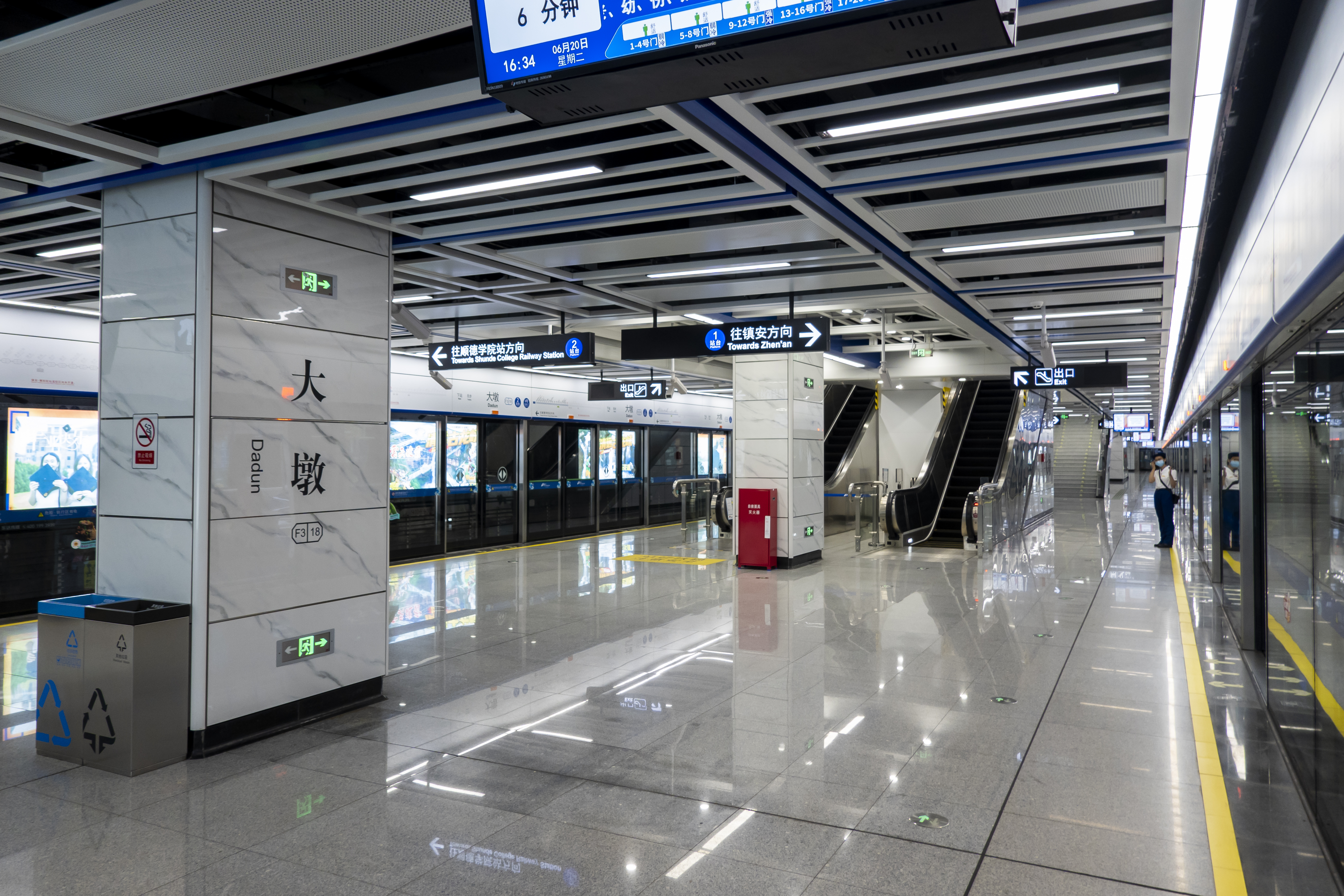
- Platform

Chinese name
- Chinese: 大墩站
Transcriptions
Standard Mandarin
- Hanyu Pinyin: Dàdūn Zhàn
Yue: Cantonese
- Yale Romanization: Daaihdēun Jaahm
- Jyutping: Daai^{6}deon^{1} Zaam^{6}

General information
- Location: Intersection of Heyue Road (荷岳路) and South Wenhua Road (文华南路) (under planning), Lecong; Shunde District, Foshan, Guangdong; China
- Coordinates: 22°57′23.36″N 113°7′25.79″E
- Operator: Foshan Metro Operation Co., Ltd.
- Line: Line 3
- Platforms: 2 (1 island platform)
- Tracks: 2

Construction
- Structure type: Underground
- Accessible: Yes

Other information
- Station code: F318

History
- Opened: 28 December 2022 (3 years ago)

Services
| Preceding station | Foshan Metro | Following station |
|---|---|---|
| Dongping towards Foshan University | Line 3 | Yuebu towards Shunde College Railway Station |
Location

Dadun station (Chinese: 大墩站; pinyin: Dàdūn Zhàn; Cantonese Yale: Daaihdēun Jaahm) is a station on Line 3 of Foshan Metro, located in Foshan's Shunde District. It opened on 28 December 2022.

== Station layout ==
The station has an island platform under Wenhua South Road.

| G | - | Exits A-D |
| L1; Concourse | Lobby | Ticket Machines, Customer Service, Shops, Police Station, Security Facilities |
| L2; Platforms | Platform 1 | 3 towards Foshan University (Dongping) |
| L2; Platforms | Island platform, doors will open on the left |
| L2; Platforms | Platform 2 | 3 towards Shunde College Railway Station (Yuebu) |

=== Entrances/exits ===
The station has 4 points of entry/exit. Exits A and B are located on the south side of Heyue Road, whilst Exits C and D are located on the north side. Exits A and C are equipped with elevators.

- A: Heyue Road
- B: Heyue Road
- C: Heyue Road
- D: Heyue Road

== History ==
On 31 August 2016, the pilot section of Line 3 (this station to Wanhua station) started construction to cooperate with the construction of the Guangzhou–Foshan circular intercity railway. The station began enclosure construction on 16 March 2017 and officially started excavation on 5 December 2018.

On 27 April 2017, the first tunnel shield of Line 3 (from this station to Dongping station) was successfully launched. The tunneling shield broke through on 8 December the same year and handed over for track laying on 31 August 2020.

On the morning of 19 April 2019, the pouring construction of the first basement floor of the station was successfully completed. On 21 November the same year, the station became the first station on the whole of Line 3 to top out.

On the afternoon of 7 August 2020, the right line tunnel from this station to Shuikou station (now Yuebu station) broke through. The tunnel section passed acceptance on 7 April 2022.

The station passed the civil acceptance on 2 November 2021. On 30 May 2022, the station completed the "three rights" transfer. On 28 December the same year, the station opened with the opening of Line 3.

== Usage ==
The nearby surroundings of this station are fishponds and farmland, and there is little flow of people, so it was dubbed "the most down-to-earth subway station" by netizens during its initial opening. At the same time, some entrances/exits of the station were blocked by river inflows, and passengers needed to take a detour for several minutes to reach the municipal road after leaving the station.
