= Beijiao West Railway Station (Foshan Metro) =

Foshan Metro Line 3 station

Beijiao West Railway Station 北滘西站
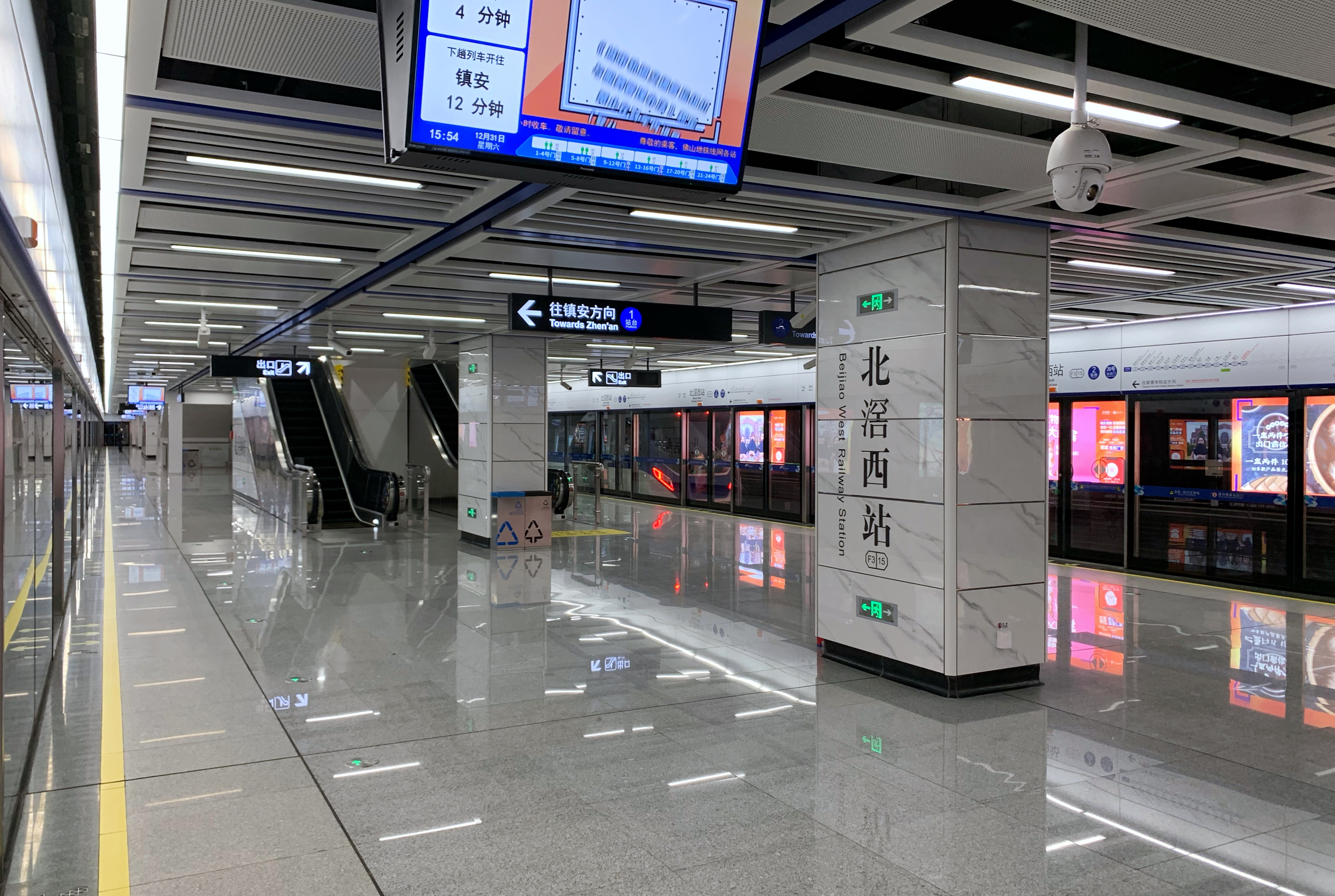
- Platform

Chinese name
- Chinese: 北滘西站
Transcriptions
Standard Mandarin
- Hanyu Pinyin: Běijiàoxī Zhàn
Yue: Cantonese
- Yale Romanization: Bākgaau Sāi Jaahm
- Jyutping: Bak^{1}gaau^{3} Sai^{1} Zaam^{6}

General information
- Location: South side of Beijiao West Railway Station, Beijiao; Shunde District, Foshan, Guangdong; China
- Coordinates: 22°57′17.14″N 113°10′22.12″E
- Operator: Foshan Metro Operation Co., Ltd.
- Line: Line 3
- Platforms: 2 (1 island platform)
- Tracks: 2
- Connections: Beijiao West

Construction
- Structure type: Underground
- Accessible: Yes

Other information
- Station code: F315

History
- Opened: 28 December 2022 (3 years ago)

Services
Preceding station	Foshan Metro	Following station
Tanzhou Convention & Exhibition Center towards Foshan University	Line 3	Gaocun towards Shunde College Railway Station
Preceding station	Pearl River Delta Metropolitan Region Intercity Railway	Following station
Shunde North towards Zhaoqing	Guangzhou–Zhaoqing intercity railway transfer at Beijiao West	Chencun towards Panyu
Location

Beijiao West railway station (Chinese: 北滘西站; pinyin: Běijiàoxī Zhàn; Cantonese Yale: Bākgaau Sāi Jaahm) is a station on Line 3 of Foshan Metro, located in Foshan's Shunde District. It opened on 28 December 2022.

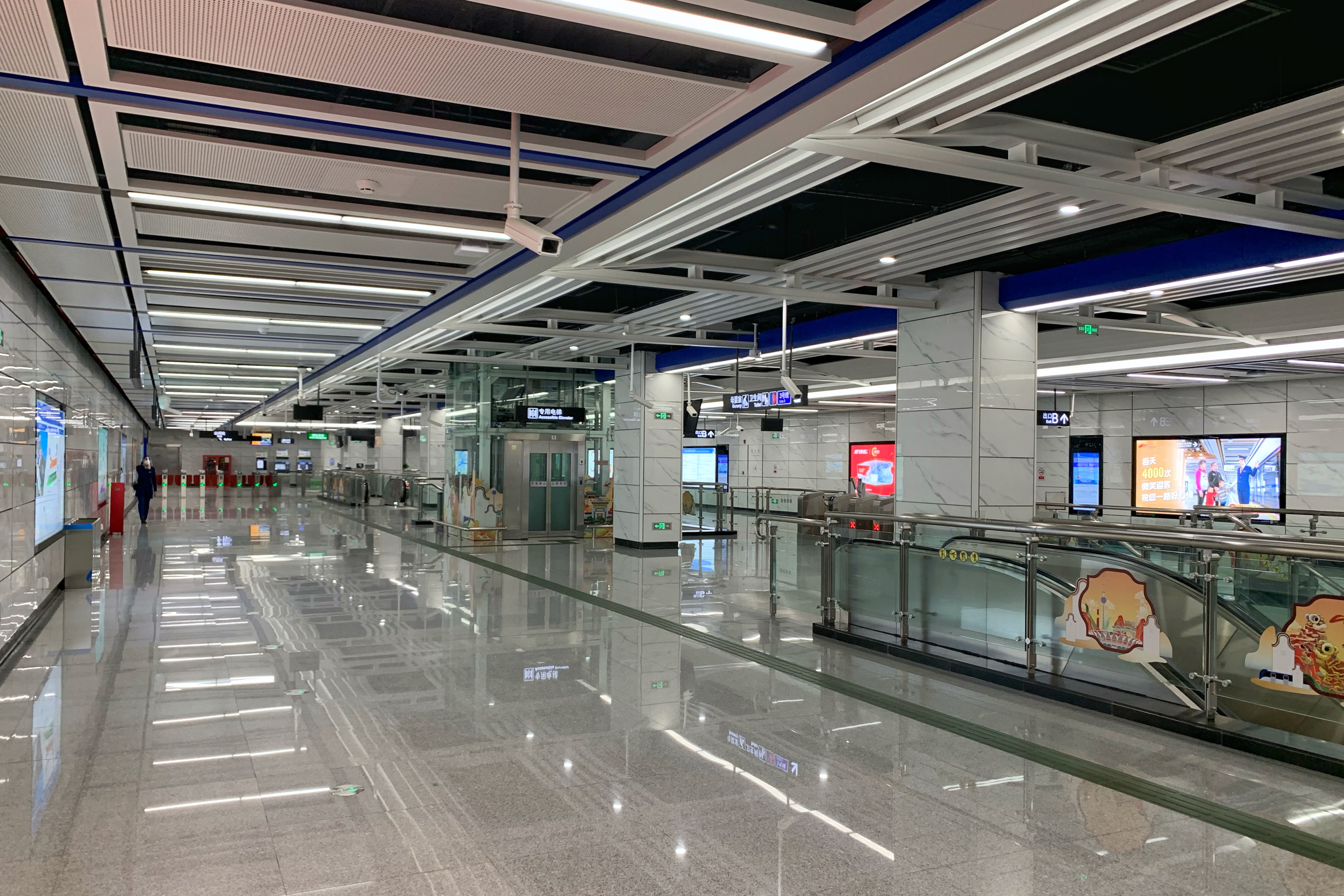
Concourse

== Station layout ==
The station has an island platform under Yuhe Road.

G	-	Exits A & B
L1; Concourse	Lobby	Ticket Machines, Customer Service, Shops, Police Station, Security Facilities
L2; Platforms	Platform 1	3 towards Foshan University (Tanzhou Convention & Exhibition Center)
L2; Platforms	Island platform, doors will open on the left
L2; Platforms	Platform 2	3 towards Shunde College Railway Station (Gaocun)

=== Entrances/exits ===
The station has 2 points of entry/exit, located on the east and west sides of Yuhe Road. Exit A is equipped with an elevator.

- A: Yuhe Road, Beijiao West railway station
- B: Yuhe Road, Beijiao West railway station
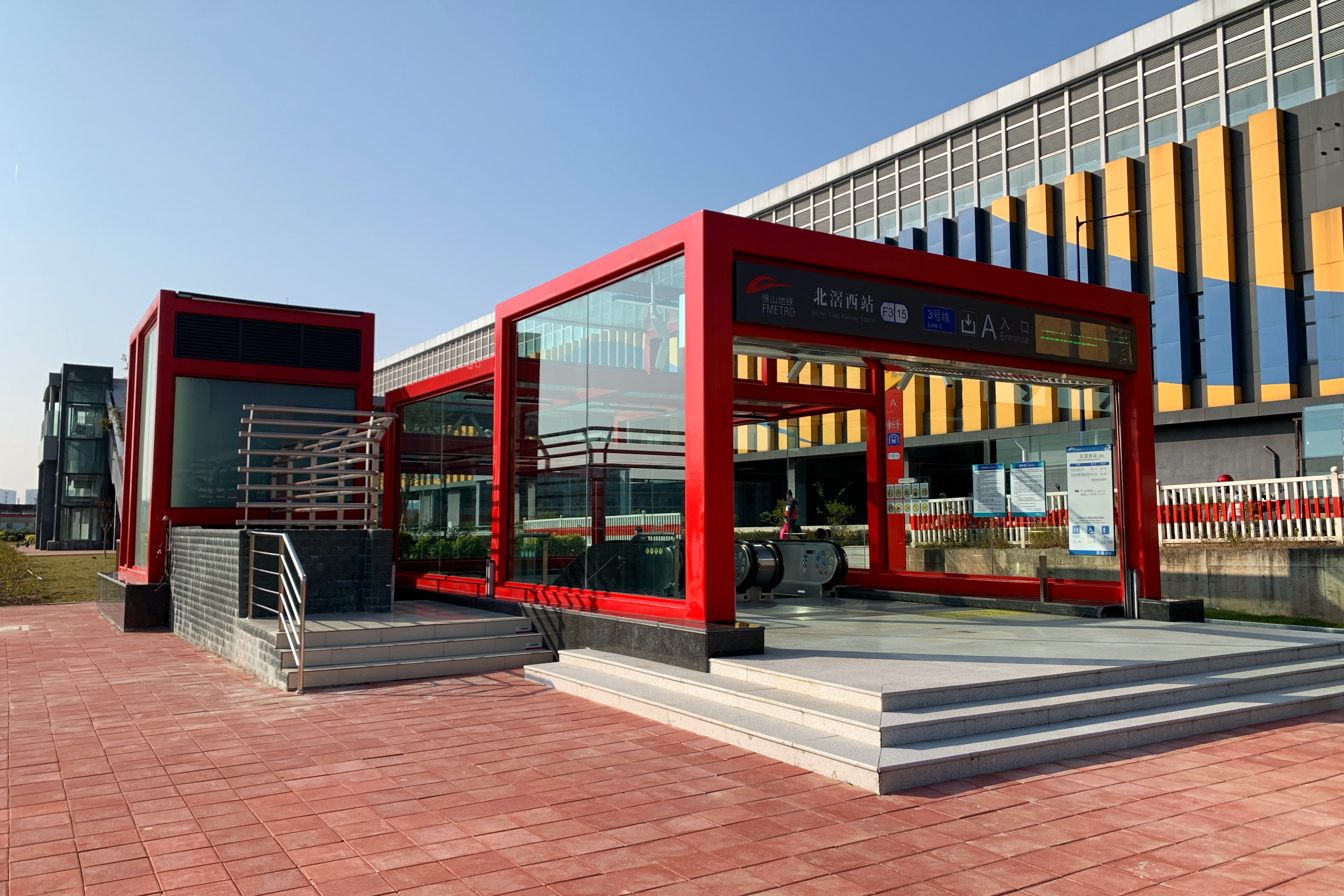
Entrance A

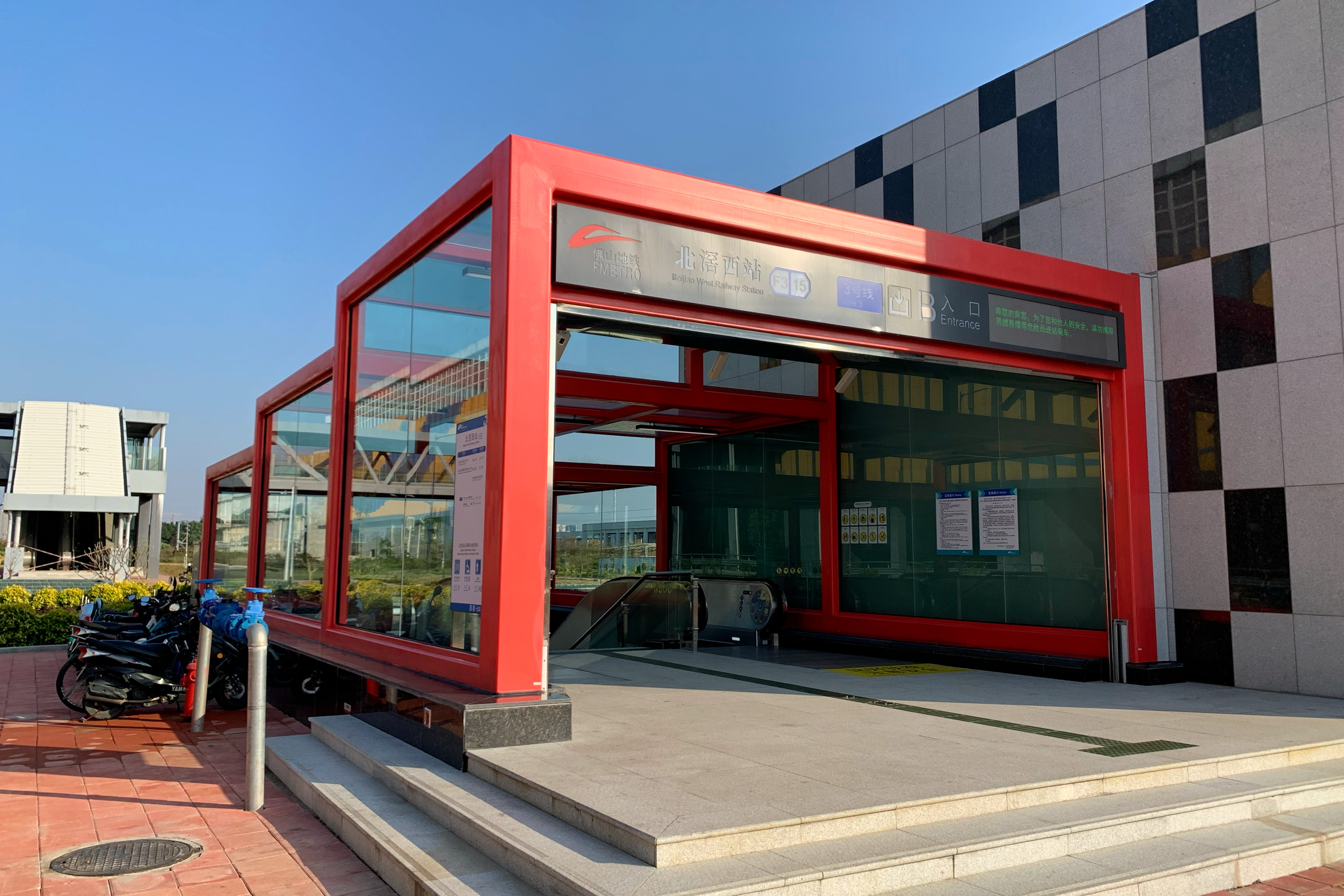
Entrance B

== History ==
On 3 December 2018, the first slab of the station was poured and officially began construction of the main structure. On 15 December 2018, the left and right line tunnels from the station to Meiqi station (now Tanzhou Convention & Exhibition Center station) safely passed under the Guangdong Tanzhou International Convention and Exhibition Center. On 29 September 2020, the open-cut section between this station and Beijiao station (now Beijiao West Railway Station metro station) successfully topped out.

The station was called Beijiao station during the planning and construction phase, and the name was taken from the nearby Beijiao Railway Station of the Guangzhou–Foshan circular intercity railway. In 2020, the intercity Beijiao station was renamed to Beijiao West railway station, and this station was subsequently renamed to Beijiao West Railway Station to correspond with the name of the intercity railway station.

On 28 December 2022, the station opened with the opening of Line 3.
