= Beijiao Park station =

Guangzhou Metro Line 7 and Foshan Metro Line 3 station

Beijiao Park 北滘公园
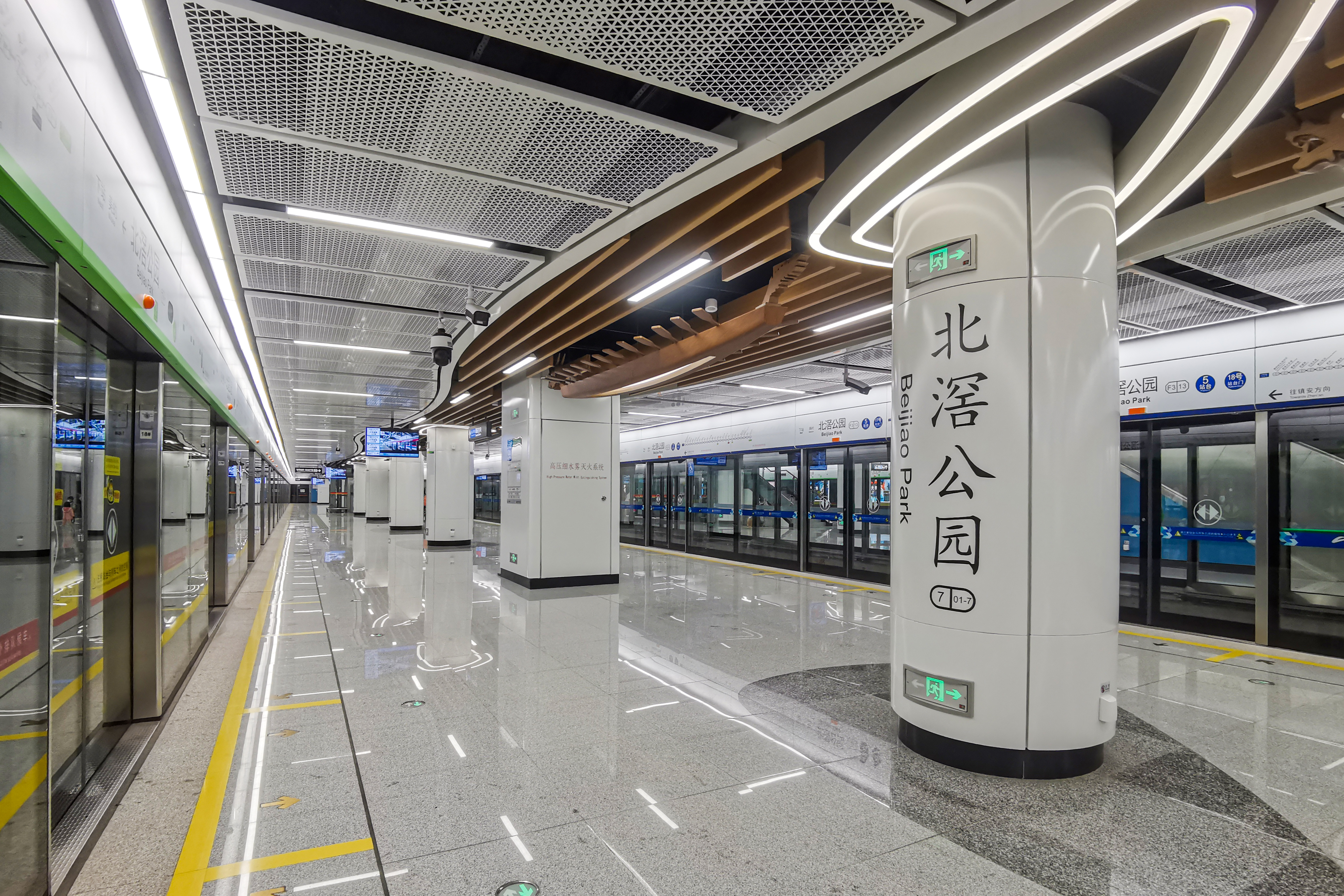
- Middle platform (Platforms 3 and 5)

Chinese name
- Simplified Chinese: 北滘公园站
- Traditional Chinese: 北滘公園站
Transcriptions
Standard Mandarin
- Hanyu Pinyin: Běijiào Gōngyuán Zhàn
Yue: Cantonese
- Yale Romanization: Bākgaau Gūng'yún Jaahm
- Jyutping: Bak^{1}gaau^{3} Gung^{1}jyun^{4} Zaam^{6}

General information
- Location: Intersection of Linshang North Road (林上北路) and Chengde Road (诚德路), Beijiao; Shunde District, Foshan, Guangdong; China
- Coordinates: 22°55′59.30″N 113°12′22.75″E
- Operator: Guangzhou Metro Group; Foshan Metro Operation Co., Ltd. (Foshan Line 3 track area only)
- Lines: Line 3 Line 7
- Platforms: 6 (3 island platforms)
- Tracks: 4

Construction
- Structure type: Underground
- Accessible: Yes

Other information
- Station code: F313 701-7

History
- Opened: Line 7: 1 May 2022 (4 years ago); Line 3: 28 December 2022 (3 years ago)
- Former names: Beijiao New Town (北滘新城)

Services
Preceding station	Guangzhou Metro	Following station
Meidi Dadao Terminus	Line 7	Midea towards Yanshan
Preceding station	Foshan Metro	Following station
Gaocun towards Foshan University	Line 3	Guangjiao towards Shunde College Railway Station
Location

Beijiao Park station (simplified Chinese: 北滘公园站; traditional Chinese: 北滘公園站; pinyin: Běijiào Gōngyuán Zhàn; Cantonese Yale: Bākgaau Gūng'yún Jaahm) is an interchange station between Line 3 of the Foshan Metro and Line 7 of the Guangzhou Metro in Foshan's Shunde District. It opened with Guangzhou Metro Line 7 on 1 May 2022, with Foshan Metro Line 3 opening on 28 December 2022.

== Station structure ==
With a total length of 210 meters, a standard section width of 49.9 meters, and an area of about 10,500 square meters, the station is the largest station on the western extension of Guangzhou Metro Line 7. In addition, this station and Foshan West Railway Station metro station, which belongs to Foshan Line 3, are stations with three-island platforms, and they are both transfer stations. However, the station line configuration and other details of the two stations are different.

The station is a themed station on the Shunde section of the western extension of Guangzhou Line 7, with the theme of "Global Vision, Baijiao Zhengrong" (全球视野·百滘峥嵘). In order to show the "Baijiao" (百滘) water culture of Beijiao, the concourse and platforms are decorated with a large number of dragon boats, oars, waves and other elements. The earth model arranged in the center of the concourse reflects the open global vision of Shunde and Beijiao.

Since the station is the interchange station of the respective lines of Guangzhou and Foshan, when Foshan Line 3 was opened, the city prefixes of "Guangzhou" and "Foshan" were added to all the line names indicated in the station when Foshan Line 3 was opened to facilitate passenger identification. (Note: When Guangzhou Line 7 was opened, the line names of all station guidance instructions in the Shunde section were directly marked as "Line 7". However, as of January 2023, the line signs on the light boxes at the entrances and exits of the station are still "Line 7" and "Line 3" without city prefixes.) In addition, although Guangzhou Line 7 and Foshan Line 3 are operated by Guangzhou Metro and Foshan Metro respectively, since this station is built by Guangzhou Metro Line 7, the entire station, including the Guangzhou Line 7 rail area, is operated by Guangzhou Metro, while Foshan Metro is only responsible for the Foshan Line 3 track area of this station.

=== Platform layout ===
G	-	Exits A2, B1, B2, C, D
L1	Lobby	Ticket Machines, Customer Service, Shops, Police Station, Security Facilities
L2; Platforms		7 towards Meidi Dadao (Terminus)
L2; Platforms	Platform 2 Platform 7	Island platform, doors will open on both sides for 3 , left for 7 (Toilets, Nursery)
L2; Platforms		3 towards Foshan University (Gaocun)
L2; Platforms	Platform 5 Platform 3	Island platform, doors will open on both sides
L2; Platforms		7 towards Yanshan (Midea)
L2; Platforms	Platform 1 Platform 4	Island platform, doors will open on both sides for 7 , left for 3 (Toilets, Nursery)
L2; Platforms		3 towards Shunde College Railway Station (Guangjiao)

=== Concourse ===
The concourse is equipped with automatic ticket machines and a customer service center. There are escalators and elevators in the paid area for passengers to access platforms 1/4 and 2/7. In order to facilitate the central platform to exit the station through the stairs, there are outbound gates at the north and south ends of the center of the concourse for passengers to exit the station, and the gates cannot enter the station reversibly.

The AED of this station is located near the control room at the Exit C portal.

=== Platforms ===
The station has three side-by-side island platforms, located underground on Linshang North Road, shared by Foshan Line 3 and Guangzhou Line 7. There are toilets and nursery rooms at the northeast end of platform 1/4 and platform 2/7 on both sides.

The platforms of Guangzhou Line 7 of this station are organized into platforms 1, 2 and 3 respectively. Foshan Line 3 is organized into platforms 4, 5 and 7, skipping the number 6. In response to relevant inquiries, Foshan Metro said that because according to the principle of odd numbering of the upbound platform and even numbering of the downward platform, it is necessary to number the platform in the up direction with odd numbers only. Therefore, the number 6 for even numbers is skipped and the odd numbers 5 and 7 are used.

This station is a forward cross-platform interchange station and is the second interchange station on the same platform on the three islands and four lines in mainland China. (Note: The first is Shanghai Metro's Hongqiao Airport Terminal 2 station, but the direction design is different from this station.) The platform of Guangzhou Line 7 towards Yanshan and the platform of Foshan Line 3 towards Foshan University adopt a Spanish solution platform layout, and trains in these two directions will open the doors on both sides when they arrive at the station. Therefore, 70% of passengers can walk to the opposite platform and transfer directly to another line to their destination, but transfers between Guangzhou Line 7 in the direction of Meidi Dadao and Foshan Line 3 in the direction of Shunde need to pass through the concourse.

In addition, the central island platform has only one lift and two stairs to the concourse. Elevators can be used for transfers or exit for passengers on this platform, while stairs are for outbound only.

Although the Foshan Line 3 part of this station is an underground station, because there is no turnaround line, when a typhoon strikes or is affected by other bad weather and needs to be suspended in the open-air section, Foshan Line 3 trains can only turn back at Gaocun station, and this station will also be suspended along with the elevated section of Guangjiao and Lunjiao stations.

=== Entrances/exits ===
In its initial opening, the station had 4 points of entry/exit. A fifth point of entry/exit, Exit D, opened at the same time as Foshan Line 3, on 28 December 2022. Exits B1 and D are equipped with elevators.

- A2: Linshang North Road
- B1: Linshang North Road
- B2: Chengde Road
- C: Chengde Road
- D: Linshang South Road
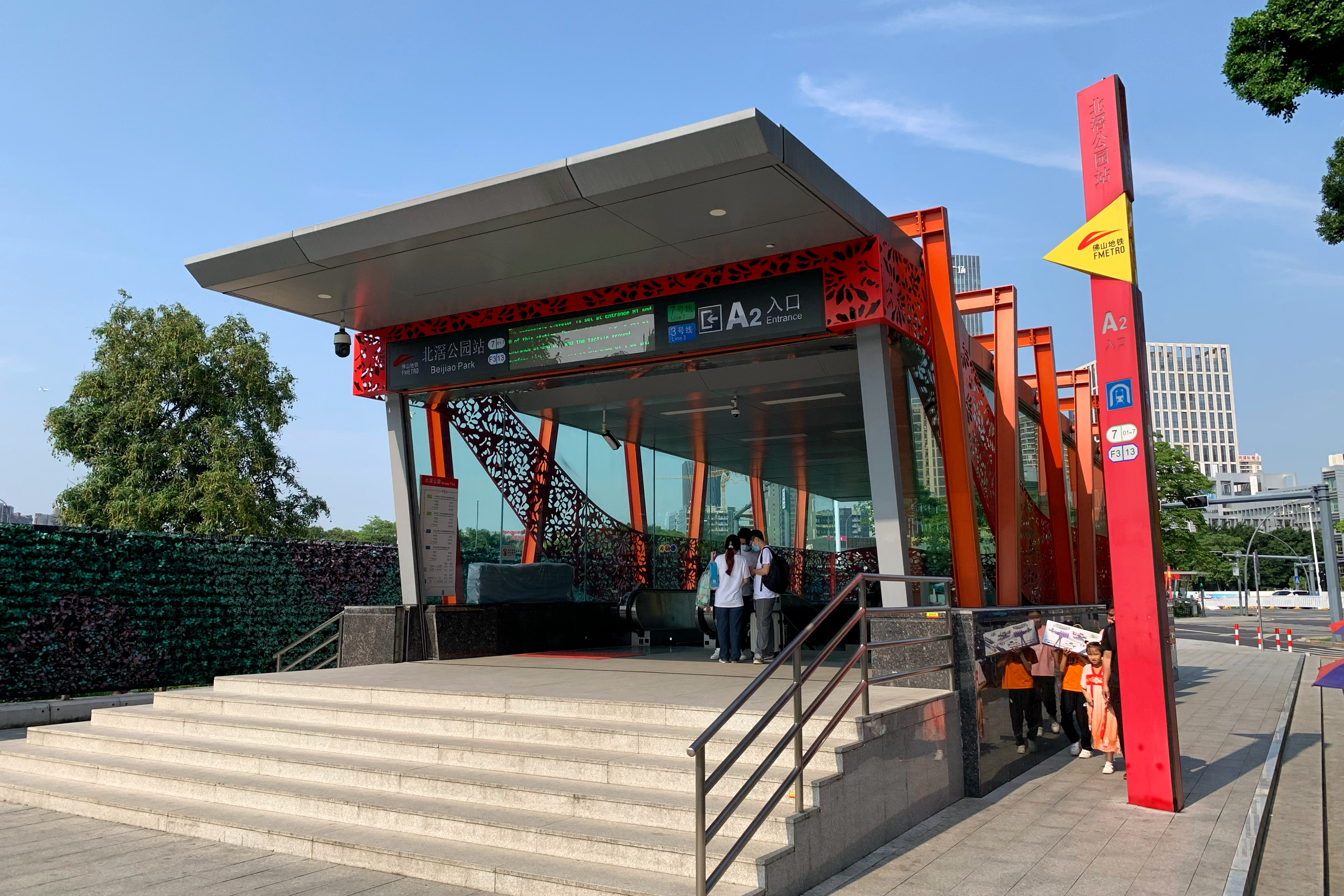
Entrance A2

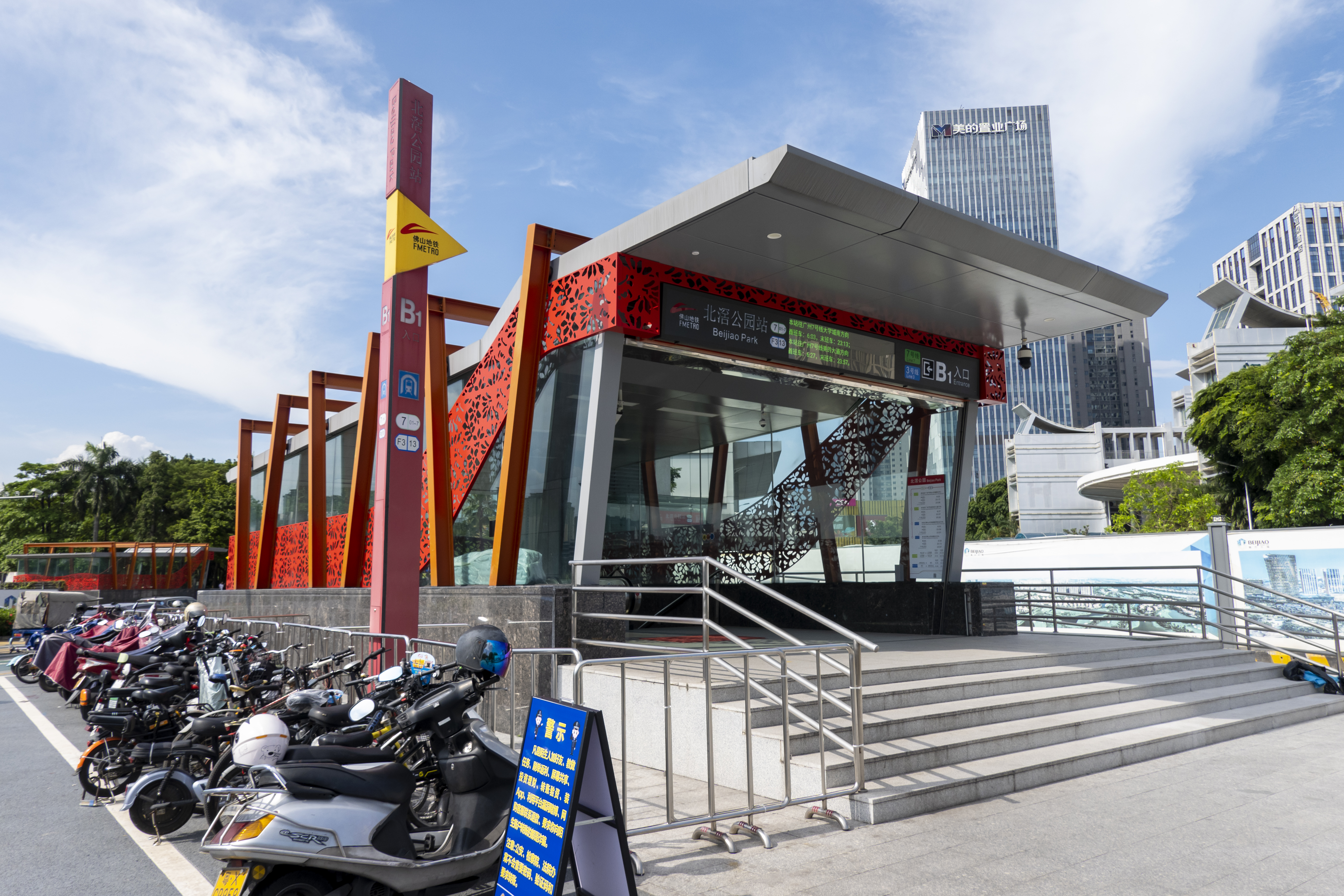
Entrance B1

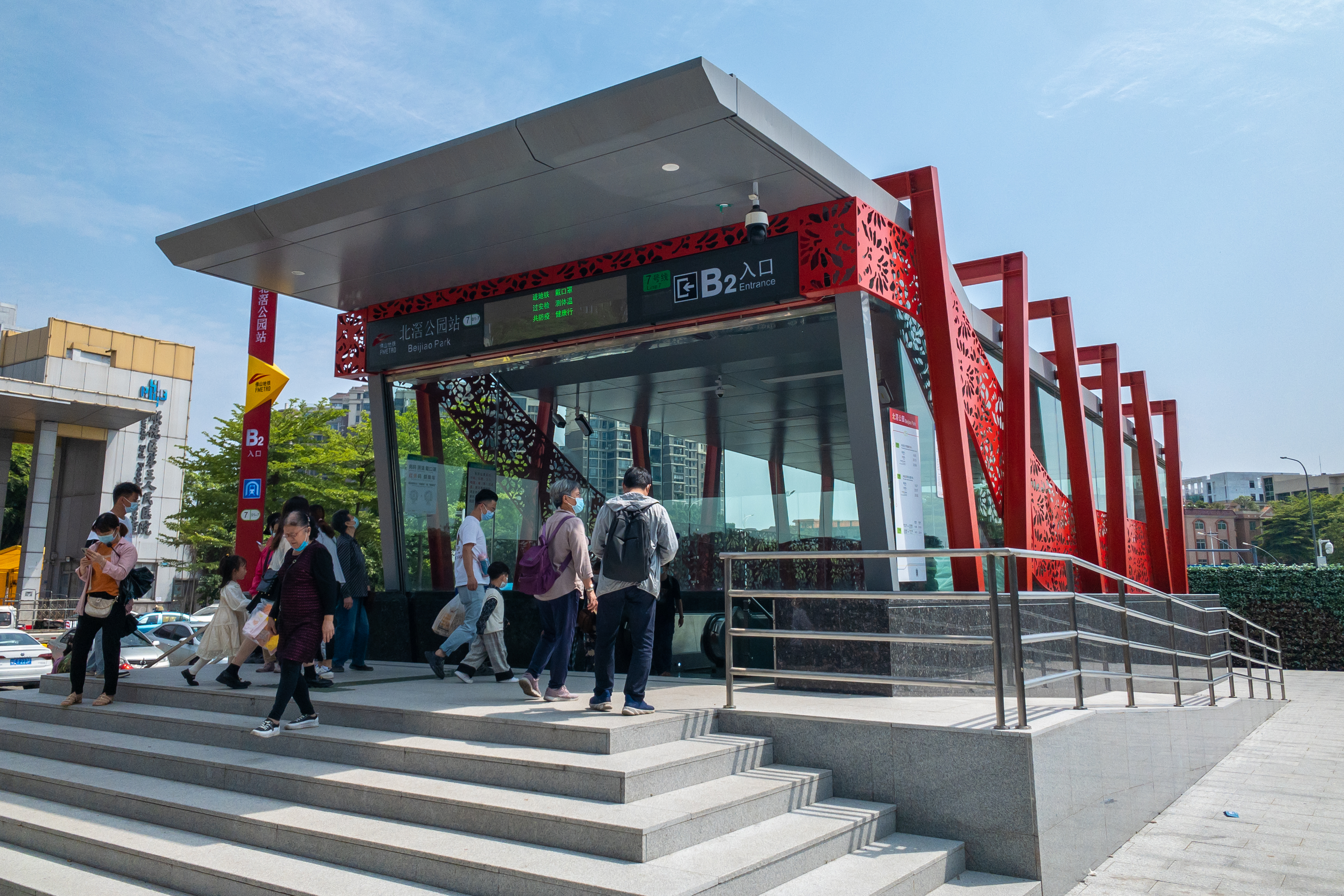
Entrance B2

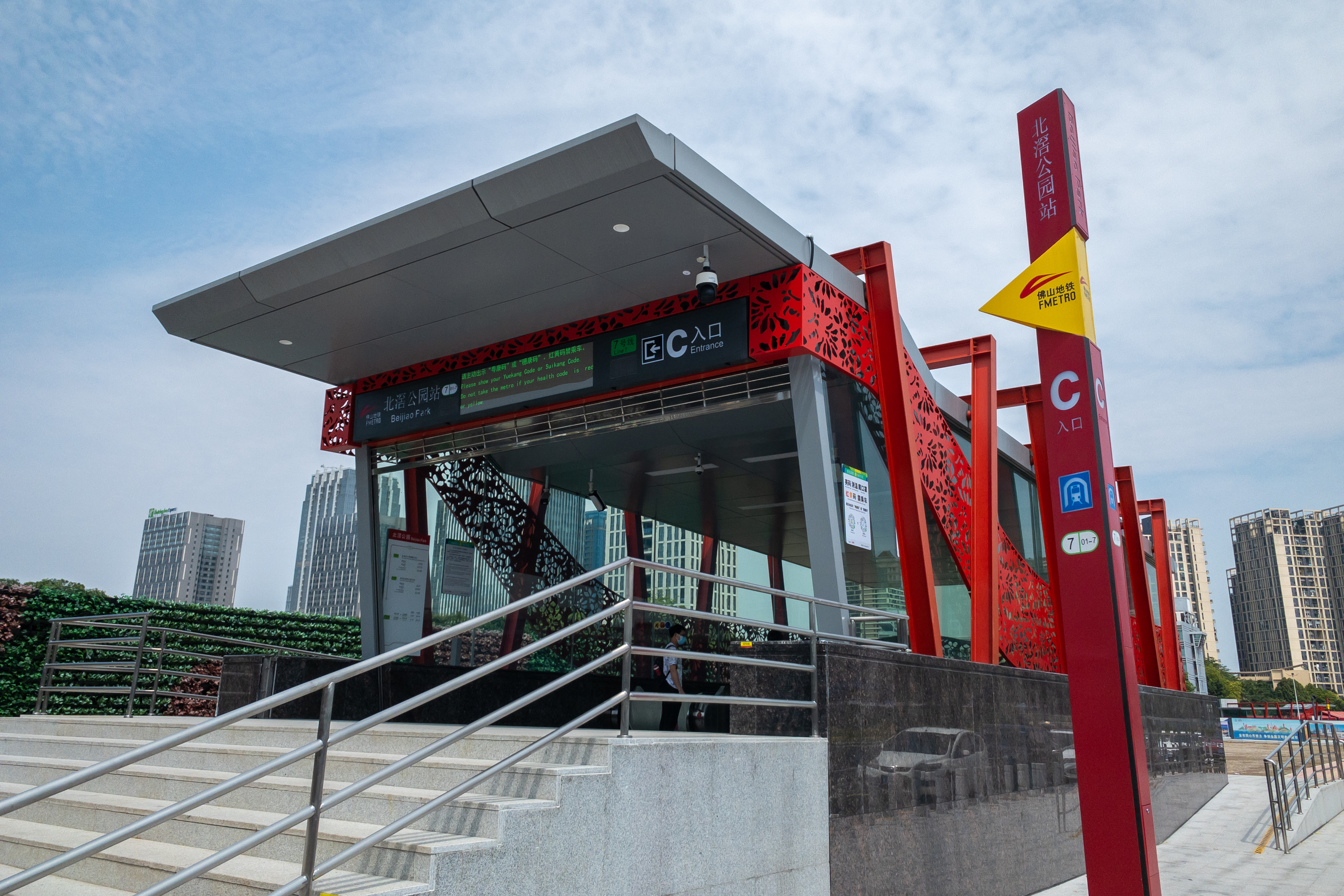
Entrance C

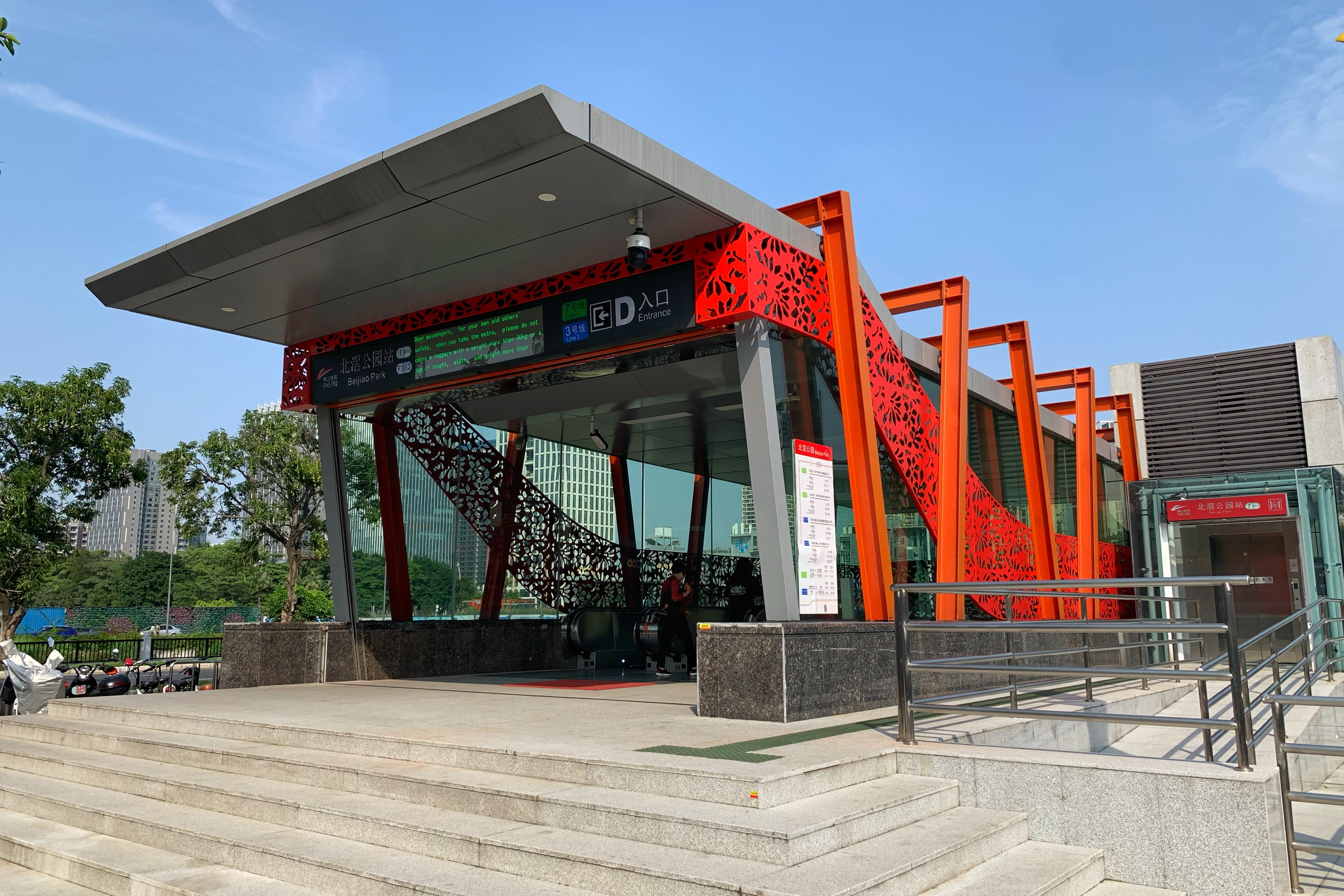
Entrance D

== Gallery ==
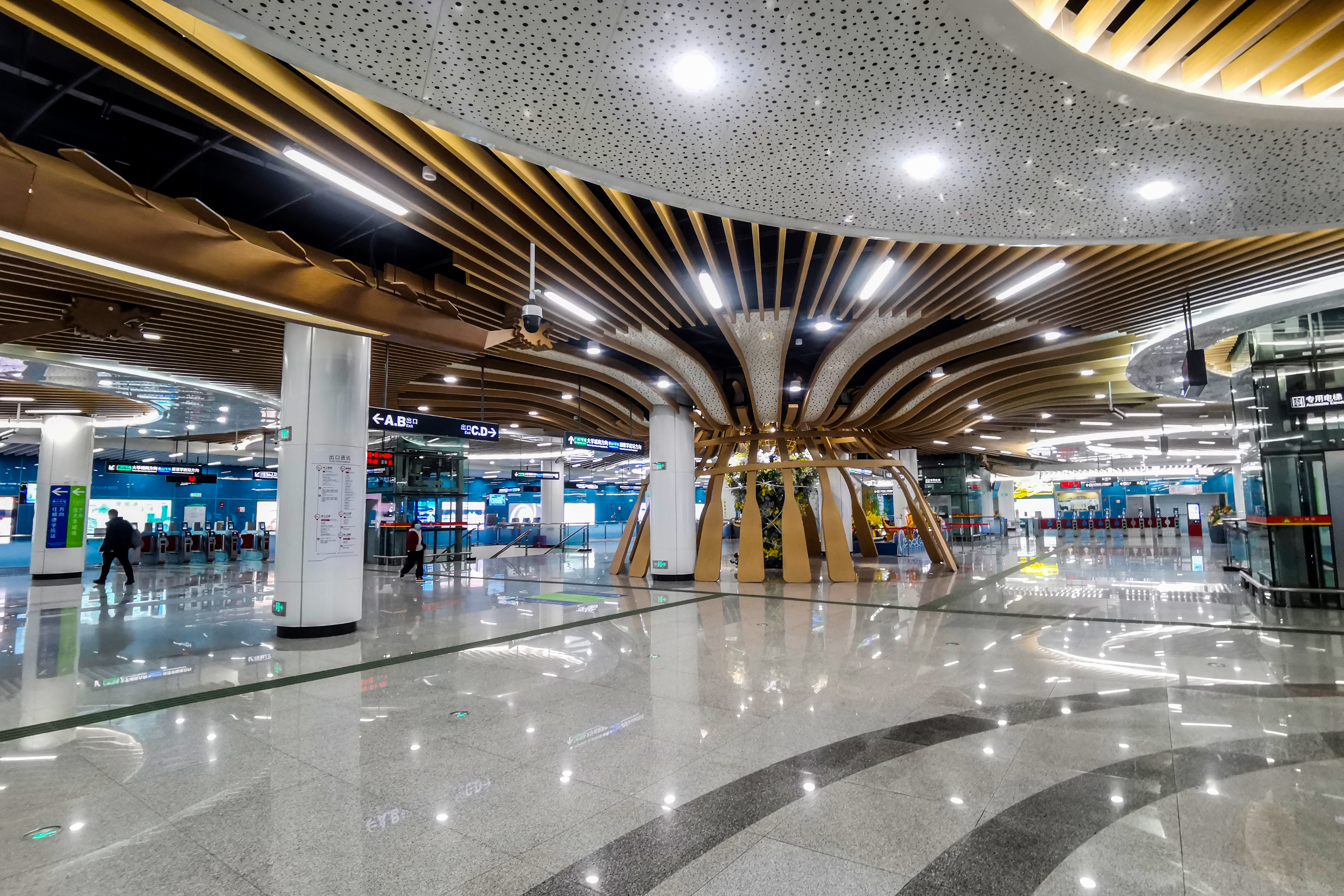
Concourse

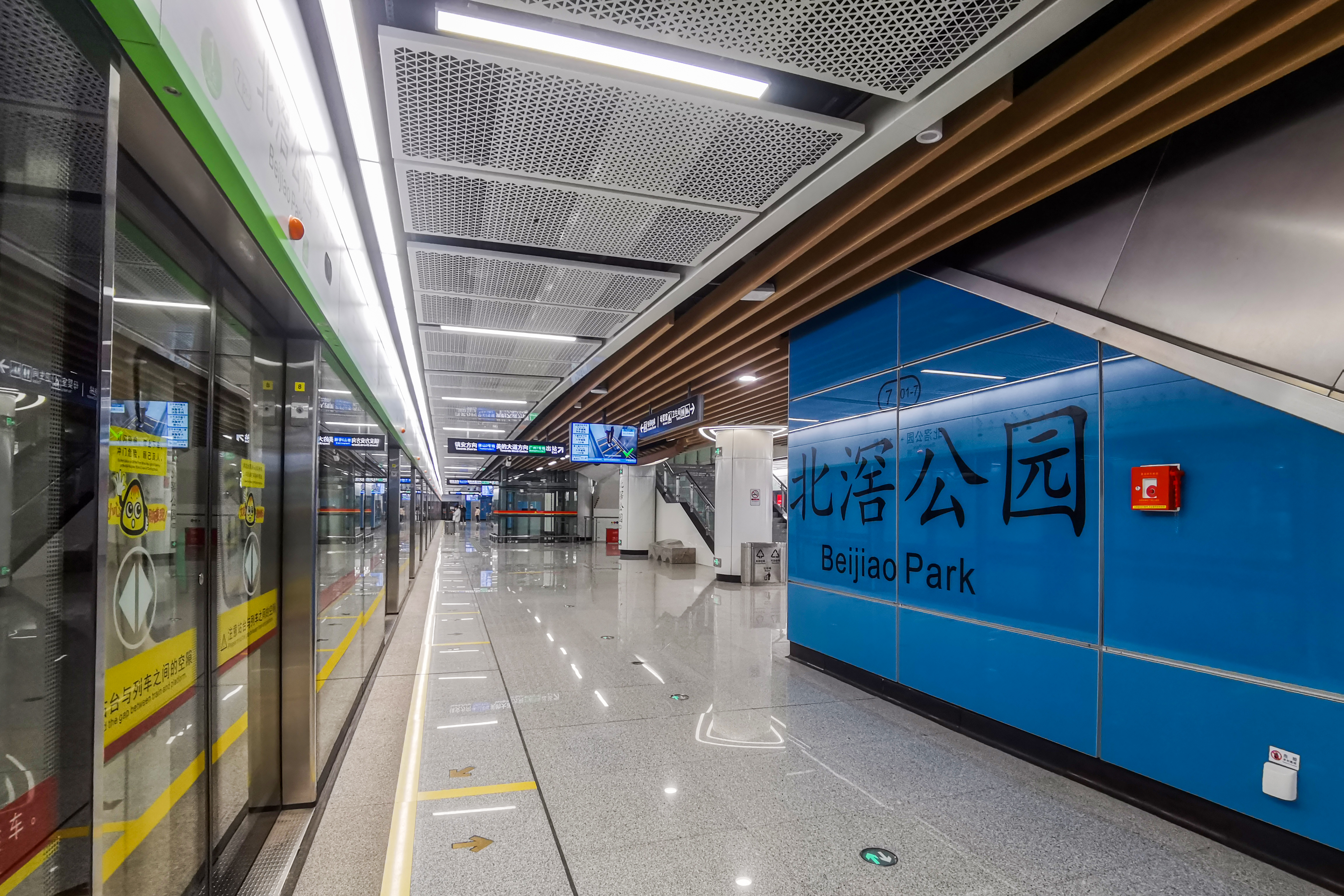
Platform 1

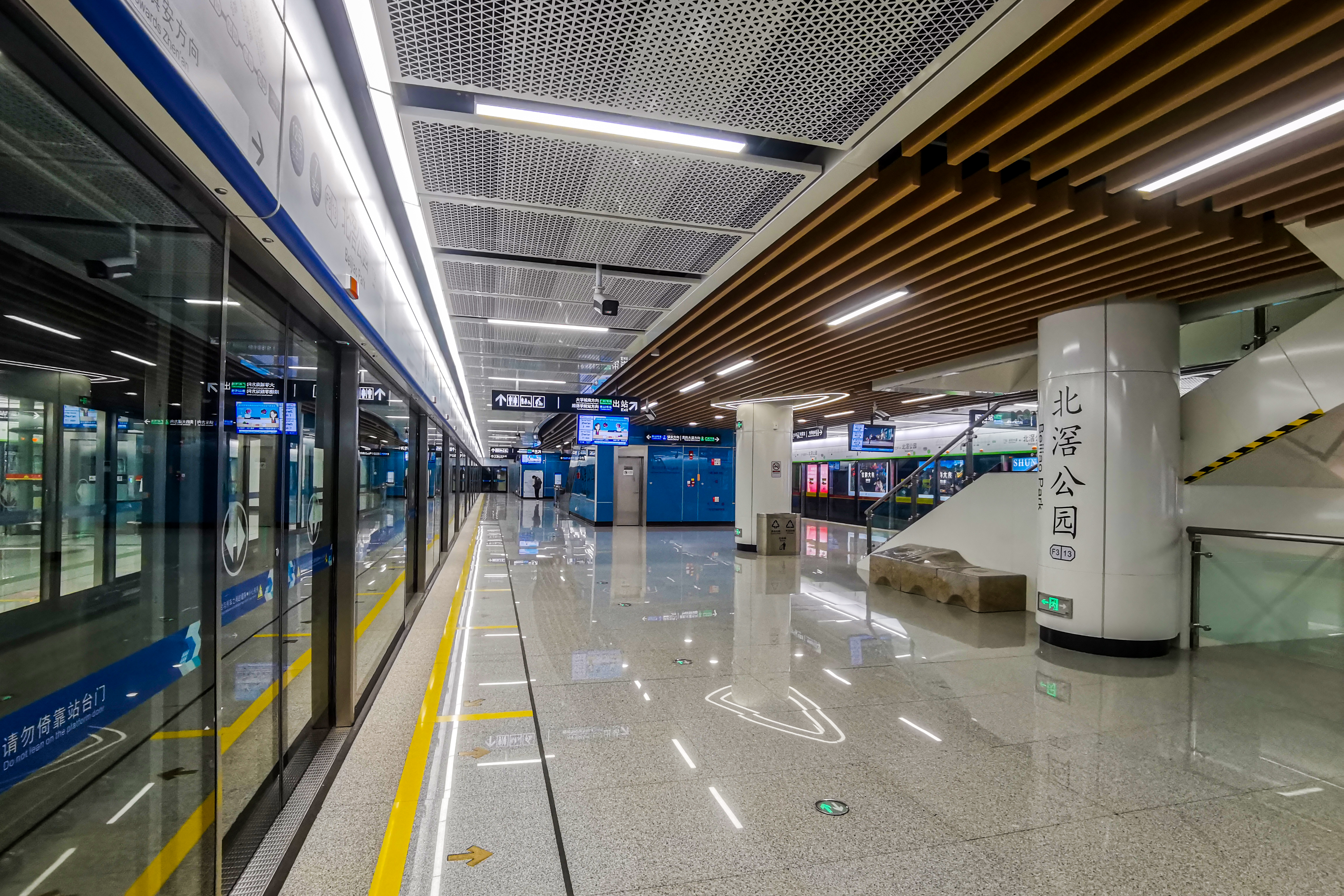
Platform 7

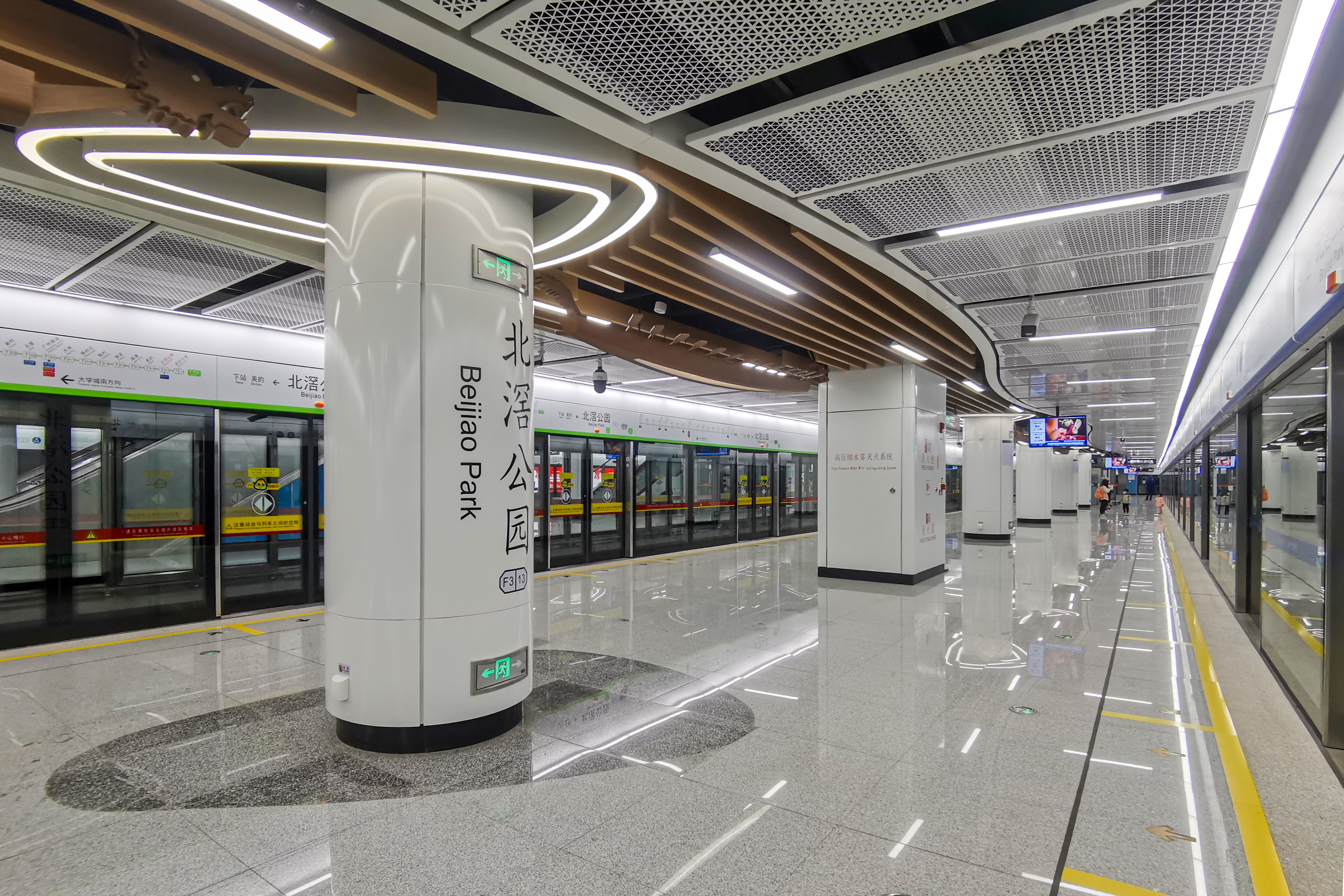
Middle platform (Platform 5)

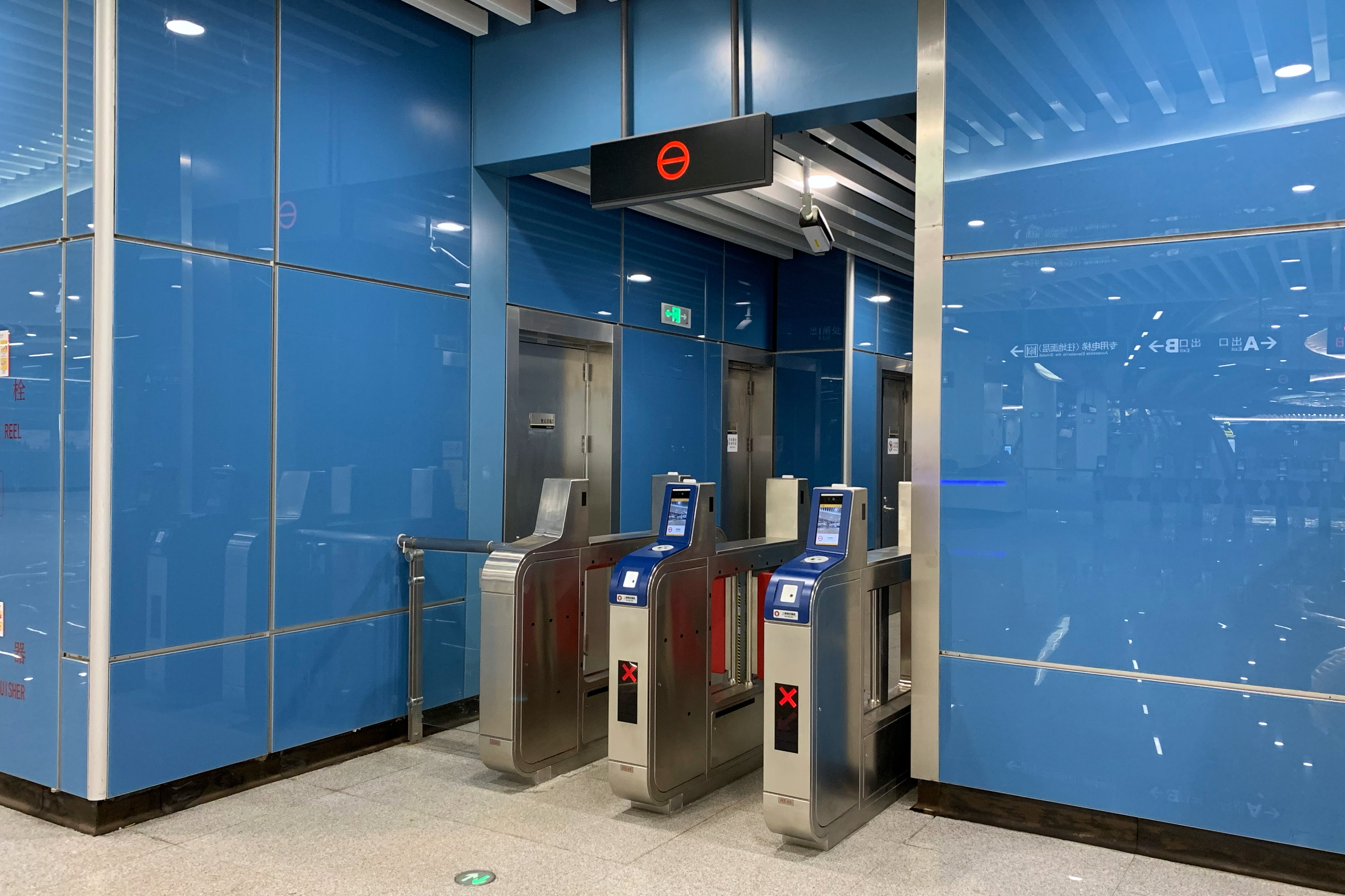
Stairs from the middle platform to the concourse, with separate turnstiles for passengers to exit the station

== History ==
The station was called Beijiao New Town station during the planning and construction phase. The station appeared as a general intermediate station of Line 3 in the early stage of Foshan Metro planning. Later, after the planning of Guangzhou Line 7 was determined to extend westward to Shunde Beijiao, the station became an interchange station and the western terminus of the western extension of Guangzhou Line 7. Later, due to the need to set up a stabling yard on Guangzhou Line 7, the western terminal was extended to Meidi Dadao, and this station was changed to an intermediate station.

The station began enclosure construction on 12 March 2017. On 16 May 2019, the base slab was sealed. On 2 September 2019, the station was topped out.

In 2021, the station was named Beijiao Park station after the western extension of Guangzhou Line 7 adjusted the station name.

At 14:00 on 1 May 2022, the station opened with the opening of the western extension of Guangzhou Line 7. When Guangzhou Line 7 opened, only platforms 1 and 2, which were located on the island platforms on both sides, were opened for use by Guangzhou Line 7. The Foshan Line 3 part of the island platform on both sides and the central island platform have been installed with screen doors and will be opened when Foshan Line 3 is opened.

During COVID-19 pandemic control rules at the end of 2022, due to the impact of prevention and control measures, station service was suspended from 28 to 30 November 2022.

At 12:00 on 28 December 2022, with the opening of the initial section of Foshan Line 3, the platform and central platform of Foshan Line 3 of this station, as well as Exit D, were opened.
