= Bijiang railway station =

Railway station in Bijiang, Guangdong, China

Coordinates: 22.9525°N 113.2571°E

Bijiang 碧江
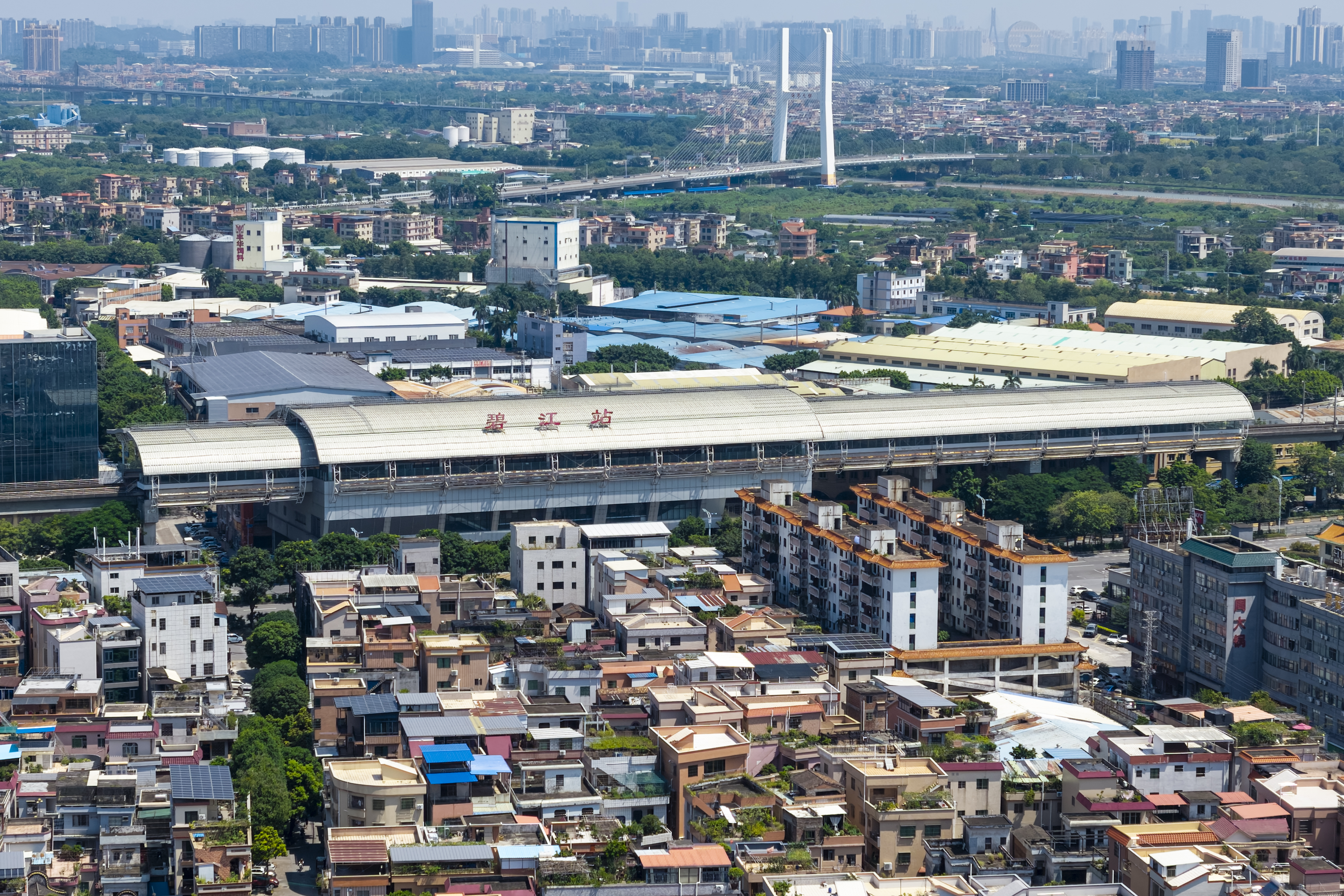
- Bijiang station in 2026

General information
- Location: Bijiang, Beijiao Town, Shunde District, Foshan, Guangdong; China
- Owner: Guangzhou-Zhuhai Intercity Mass Rapid Transit
- Operator: CR Guangzhou
- Line: Guangzhou–Zhuhai intercity railway

Other information
- Status: Suspended

History
- Opened: 1 February 2013
- Closed: 11 October 2020 (suspended)
- Former names: Chencun Station (Chinese: 陈村站)

Services
Preceding station	Pearl River Delta Metropolitan Region Intercity Railway	Following station
Guangzhou–Zhuhai intercity railway does not stop here

Former services
Preceding station	Pearl River Delta Metropolitan Region Intercity Railway	Following station
Guangzhou South Terminus	Guangzhou–Zhuhai intercity railway Suspended 2020	Beijiao towards Zhuhai
Location

Bijiang railway station (Chinese: 碧江站) is an elevated station of Guangzhou-Zhuhai Intercity Railway. The line started operation on 7 January 2011, but the station itself opened two years later, on 1 February 2013. Service of Bijiang railway station has suspended since 11 October 2020.

The station is located at Bijiang (Chinese: 碧江), Beijiao Town in Shunde District, Foshan, Guangdong, China, near China National Highway 105, Bigui Lu (Chinese: 碧桂路), Guangzhou-Zhuhai Expressway West Line (Chinese: 广珠西线高速公路) and Fochen Lu (Chinese: 佛陈路). It is the first station in Shunde for the trains departing from Guangzhou South railway station.
