= Lecong =

Lecong 乐从镇
- Town
- Location within Guangdong
- Coordinates: 22°57′33″N 113°05′17″E
- Country: China
- Province: Guangdong
- Prefecture-level city: Foshan
- District: Shunde

Area
  - Total: 78 km^{2} (30 sq mi)
- Elevation: 3 m (9.8 ft)

Population (2010)
  - Total: 230,000
  - Density: 2,900/km^{2} (7,600/sq mi)
- Time zone: UTC+8 (China Standard)
- Area code: 440606103

Lecong (simplified Chinese: 乐从; traditional Chinese: 樂從; pinyin: Lècóng; Jyutping: lok^{6}cung^{4}) is a town in Shunde District, Foshan City, Guangdong province, Southern China.

== Geography ==
Lecong is situated in the hinterland of the Pearl River Delta, the northwestward of Shunde and the south of the central urban area of Foshan. There are less than 30 km from Lecong to Guangzhou and only over 100 km to Hong Kong and Macau.

== Transportation ==
The National Highway 325 runs through from the south to the north.

== Economy ==
Lecong is one of the richest towns in Shunde. This is due to the furniture market, steel market and the plastic market. Since the 1990s it is an major trading area for furniture. The Lecong Furniture City is the world's largest distribution center for furniture. As of 2024, it is home to 5,000 furniture sellers.
