= Beijiao, Guangdong =

Beijiao 北滘镇
- Town
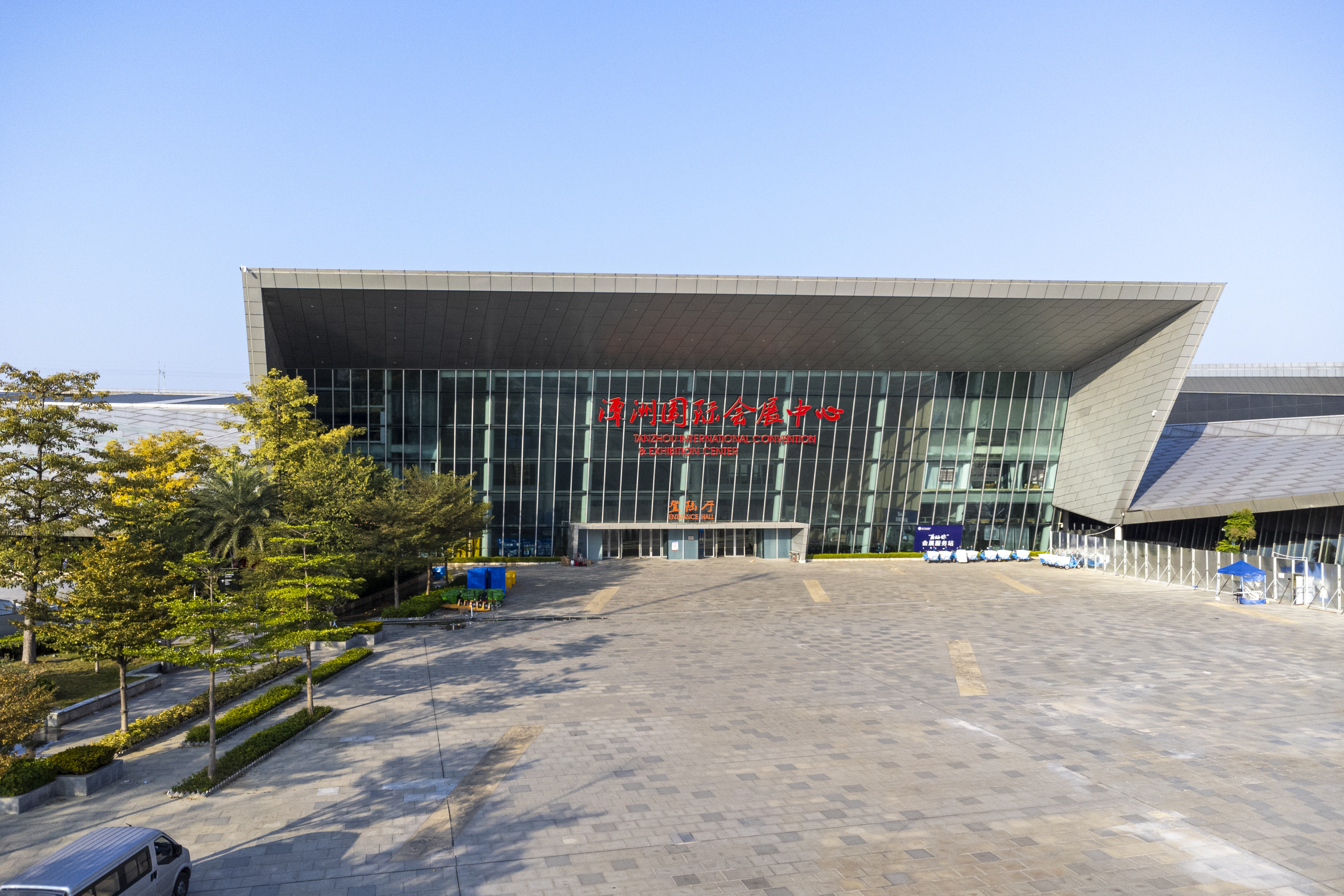
- The Tanzhou International Convention & Exhibition Center, located within Beijiao

- Location of Beijiao in Shunde

- Map showing Beijiao in Guangdong
- Country: China
- Province: Guangdong
- Prefecture-level city: Foshan
- District: Shunde

Area
  - Total: 92.11 km^{2} (35.56 sq mi)

Population (2019)
  - Total: 420,000

Beijiao (simplified Chinese: 北滘镇; traditional Chinese: 北滘鎮; pinyin: Běijiào Zhèn) is a town in the district of Shunde, in the prefecture-level city of Foshan, Guangdong, China. The town covers an area of 92.11 square kilometres (35.56 sq mi). Per a 2020 publication by the government of Shunde District, Beijiao has a permanent population of about 420,000 people; Beijiao has a hukou population of 150,695 as of 2018.

== Administrative divisions ==
The town is divided into 10 residential communities and 10 administrative villages.

=== Residential communities ===
- Beijiao Residential Community (Chinese: 北滘社区)
- Bijiang Residential Community (Chinese: 碧江社区)
- Lintou Residential Community (Chinese: 林头社区)
- Guangjiao Residential Community (Chinese: 广教社区)
- Sanhongqi Residential Community (Chinese: 三洪奇社区)
- Chayong Residential Community (Chinese: 槎涌社区)
- Biguiyuan Residential Community (Chinese: 碧桂园社区)
- Shunjiang Residential Community (Chinese: 顺江社区)
- Junlan Residential Community (Chinese: 君兰社区)
- Shejicheng Residential Community (Chinese: 设计城社区)

=== Administrative villages ===
- Huanglong Village (Chinese: 黄龙村)
- Shencun Village (Chinese: 莘村村)
- Shuikou Village (Chinese: 水口村)
- Malong Village (Chinese: 马龙村)
- Shangliao Village (Chinese: 上僚村)
- Xijiao Village (Chinese: 西滘村)
- Gaocun Village (Chinese: 高村村)
- Taocun Village (Chinese: 桃村村)
- Xihai Village (Chinese: 西海村)
- Sangui Village (Chinese: 三桂村)

== Economy ==
As of 2019, Beijiao's GDP was ¥64.5 billion, and grew at 7.3% annual rate. The town exported ¥83 billion worth of goods. Beijiao's tax revenue in 2019 totaled ¥14.03 billion.

The headquarters of Midea Group and Country Garden are both located in Beijiao. DJI also has a presence in the city.

Near Beijiao, there is the static inverter plant of HVDC Tianshengqiao-I Dam.

== Healthcare ==
The town has a hospital.

== Transportation ==
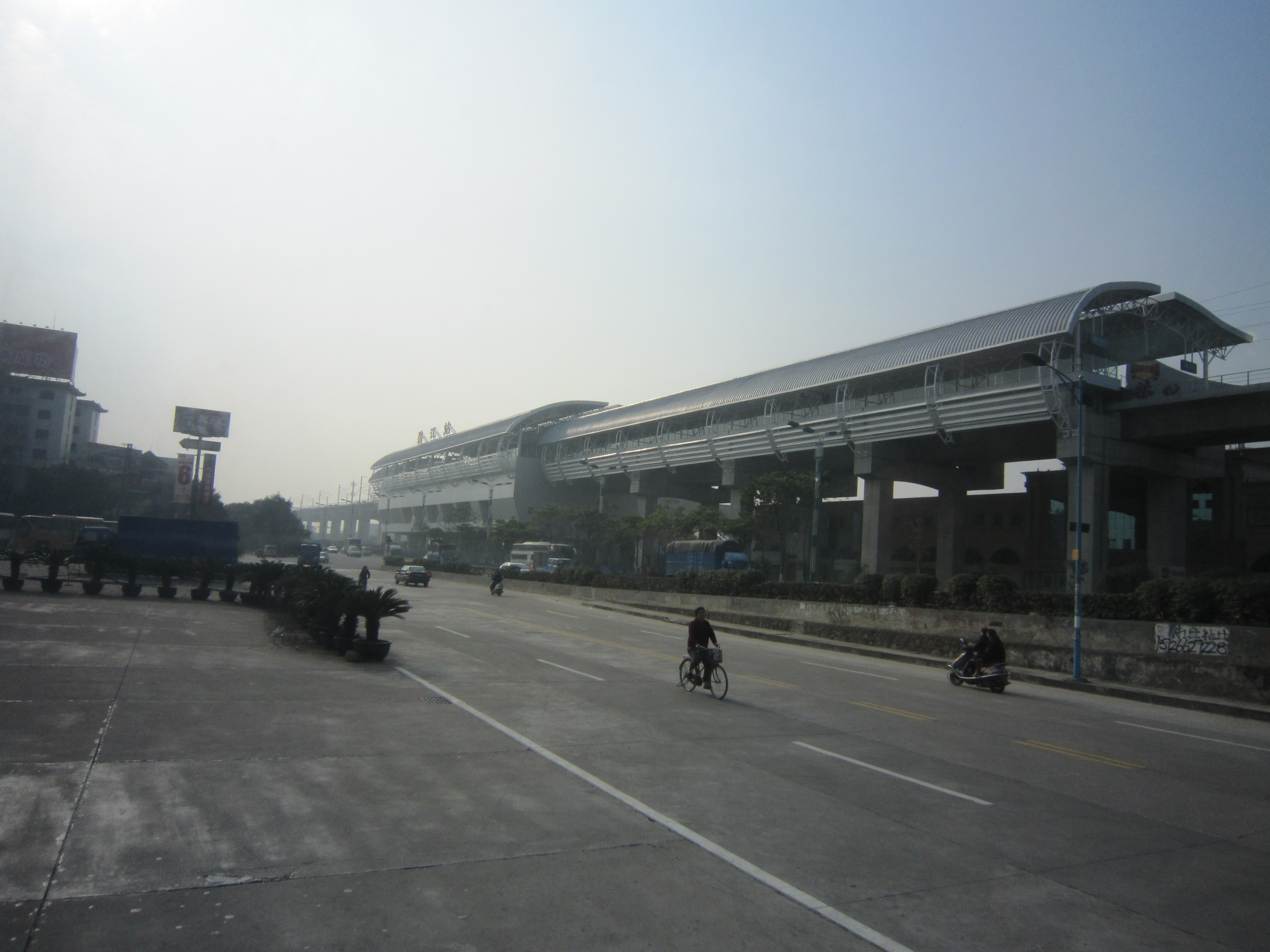
Bijiang railway station, 2011

=== Road ===
The Foshan First Ring Expressway runs through Beijiao.

=== Rail ===
The town has two stations on the Guangzhou–Zhuhai intercity railway: Beijiao Station and Bijiang Station. Beijiao is also currently served by two metro lines, Guangzhou Metro Line 7 and Foshan Metro Line 3 at Beijiao Park station. Foshan Metro Line 11 is currently approved for construction and the Guangzhou–Foshan circular intercity railway is under construction.

=== Port ===
The town has a port, which processes about 330,000 containers annually.
