= Chencun station =

Chencun station may refers to:

- Chencun railway station, station of Guangzhou-Zhaoqing (Guangzhou–Foshan Ring) intercity railway.
- Chencun station (Guangzhou Metro), station of Guangzhou Metro line 7.
