= Chencun railway station =

Railway station in Shunde, Guangdong

Chencun 陈村
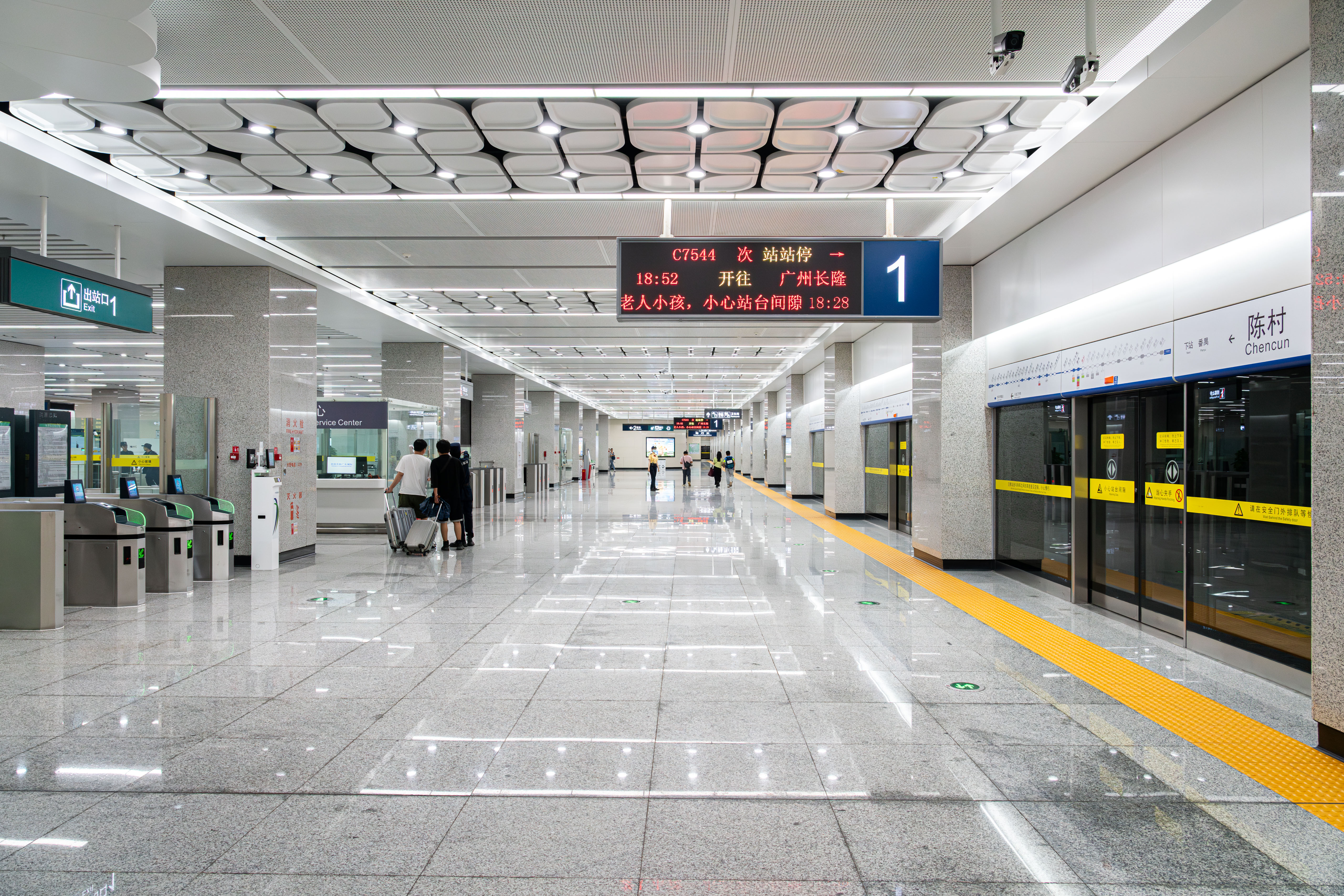
- Platform 1 (towards Panyu)

Chinese name
- Simplified Chinese: 陈村站
- Traditional Chinese: 陳村站
Transcriptions
Standard Mandarin
- Hanyu Pinyin: Chéncūn Zhàn
Yue: Cantonese
- Yale Romanization: Chàhnchyūn Jaahm
- Jyutping: Can^{4}tsuen^{4} Zaam^{6}

General information
- Location: South of the intersection of Chencun Avenue (陈村大道) and Baichen Road (白陈路), Chencun Subdistrict; Shunde District, Foshan, Guangdong; China
- Coordinates: 22°58′18.887″N 113°13′57.706″E
- Owner: Pearl River Delta Metropolitan Region intercity railway
- Operator: Guangdong Intercity
- Lines: Guangzhou–Foshan circular intercity railway (Southern Ring section); Guangzhou–Zhaoqing intercity railway
- Platforms: 2 (2 side platforms)
- Tracks: 2
- Connections: 7 Chencun

Construction
- Structure type: Elevated
- Accessible: Yes

Other information
- Station code: CVA (Pinyin: CCU)

History
- Opened: 26 May 2024 (2 years ago)

Services
Preceding station	Pearl River Delta Metropolitan Region Intercity Railway	Following station
Beijiao West towards Zhaoqing	Guangzhou–Zhaoqing intercity railway	Panyu Terminus
Transfer at Chencun
Preceding station	Guangzhou Metro	Following station
Jinlong towards Meidi Dadao	Line 7 transfer at Chencun	Chencunbei towards Yanshan
Location

Chencun railway station (Chinese: 陈村站; pinyin: Chéncūn Zhàn; Cantonese Yale: Chàhnchyūn Jaahm) is an underground railway station in Shunde District, Guangdong, China. The station opened on 26 May 2024, and is operated by Guangdong Intercity Railway Operation Co., Ltd.

== Features ==
This station is a two side-platformed station with one underpass floor. The station is divided into north and south sections by tracks, and the platforms are directly connected to their respective concourses. In addition, the design of the station ceiling incorporates elements of flower petals and lion skirts.

== Interchanges ==
The station connects to Chencun, a nearby metro station served by Line 7 of Guangzhou Metro. Due to the suspension of the Pacific Housing Construction Project next to the passage due to financial problems, the transfer passageway connecting the two stations does not meet the conditions for implementation and construction, and therefore has been suspended. Passengers will need to exit the station and transfer via an out-of-station interchange (OSI).

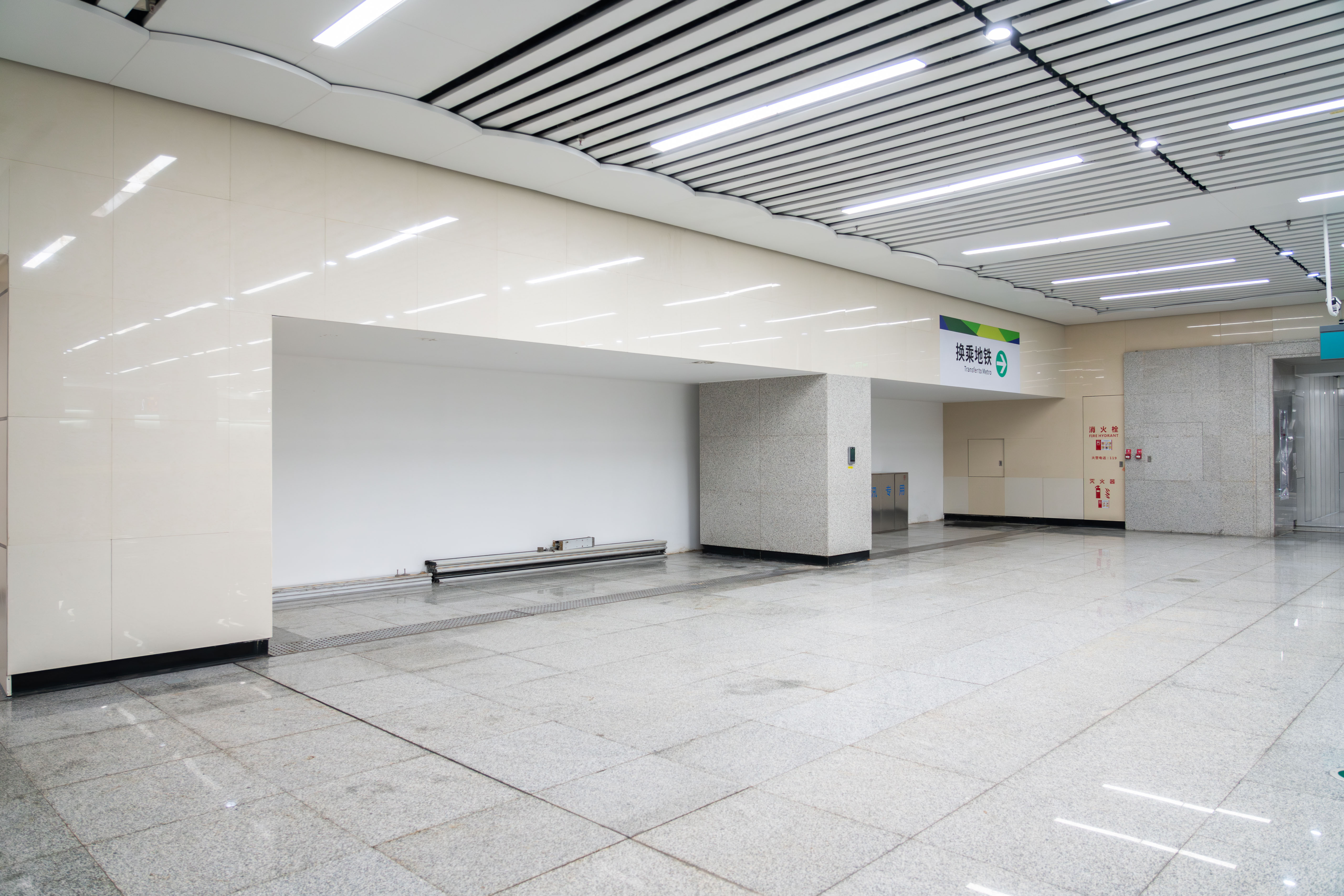
Transfer node (construction suspended)

== Entrances/exits ==
The station has 4 points of entry/exit, lettered A-D. Currently, only Exit B on the north side and Exit D on the south side are open. Both exits are accessible via elevators.

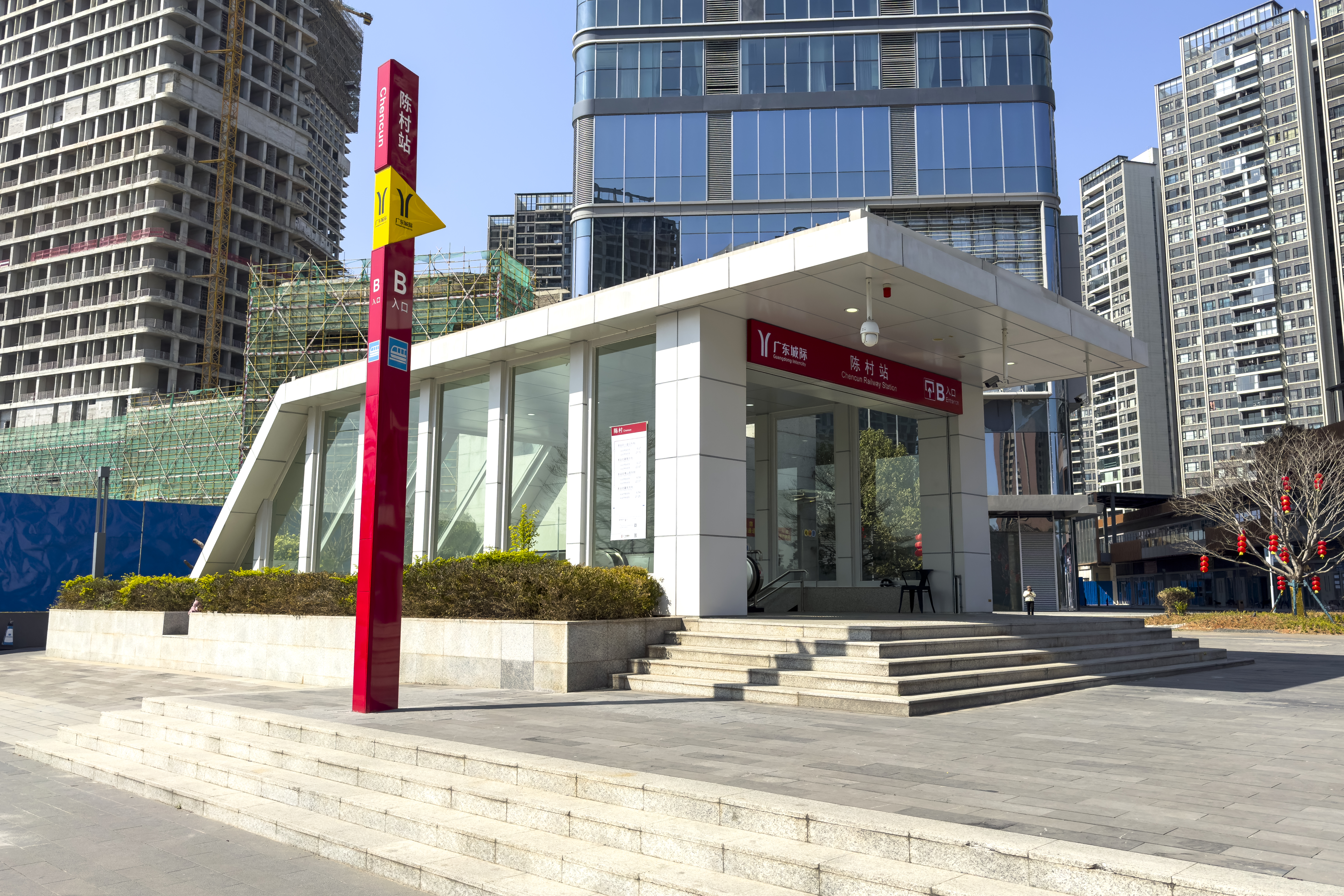
Entrance B

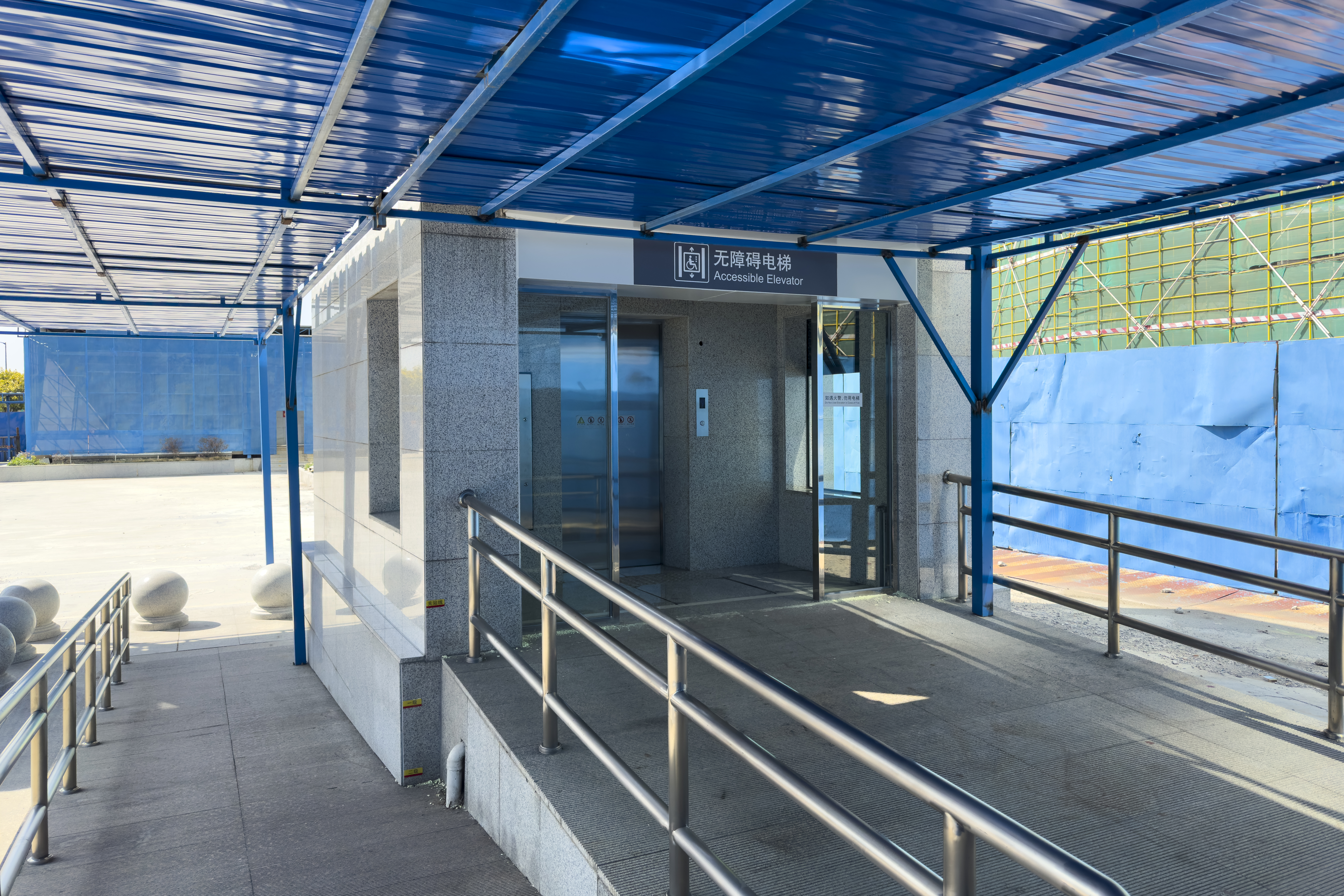
Elevator of Entrance B

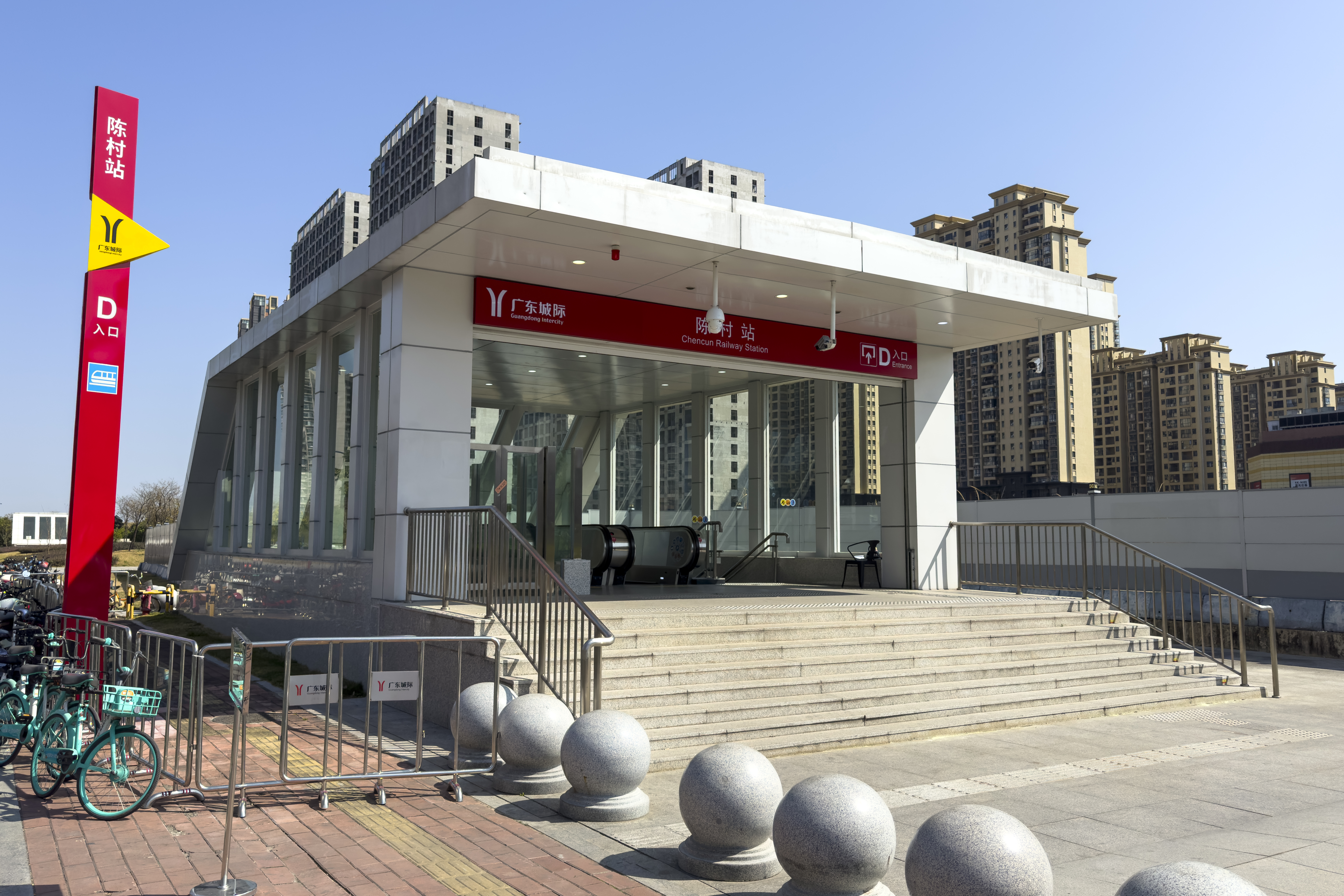
Entrance D

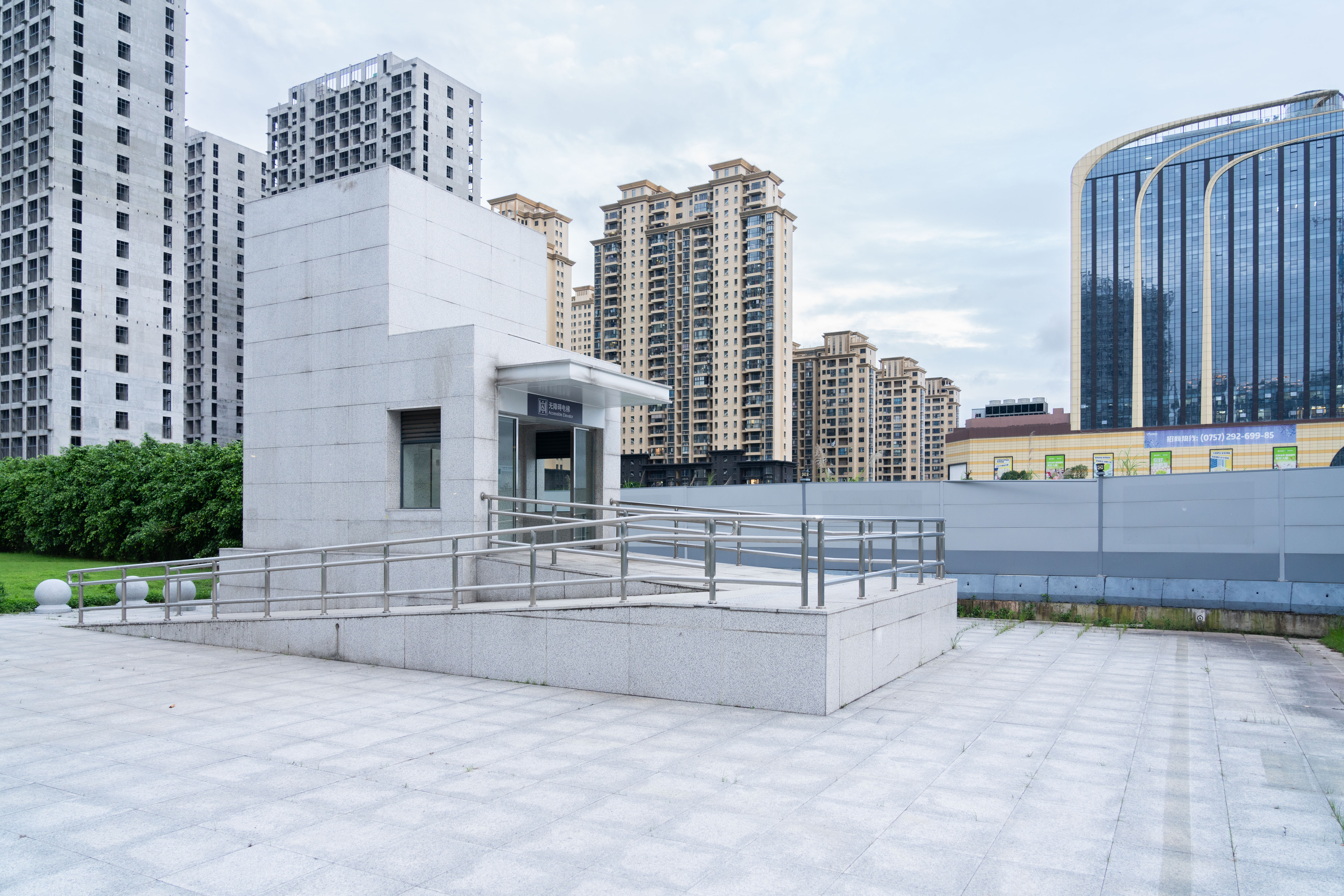
Elevator of Entrance D

== Gallery ==
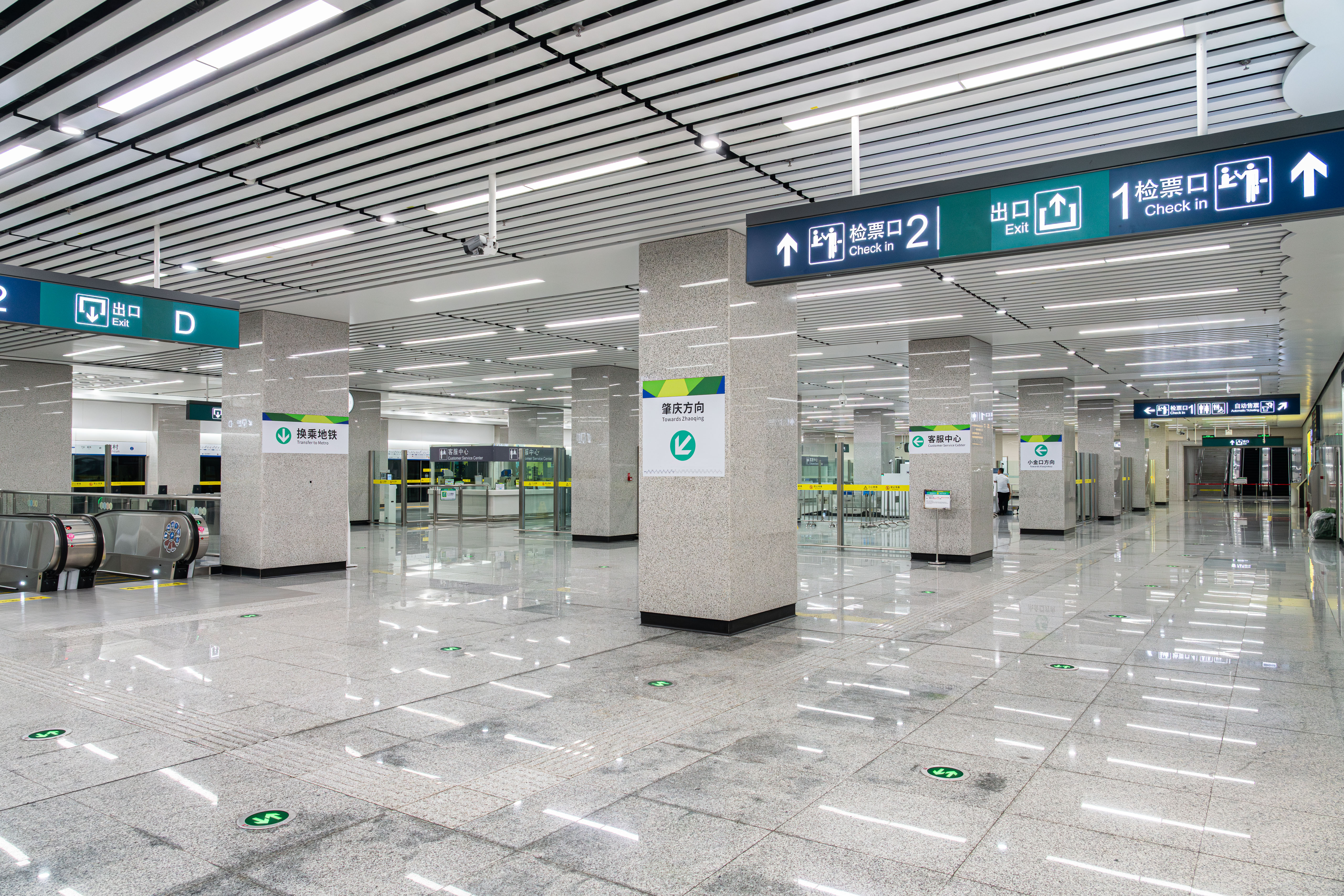
North concourse

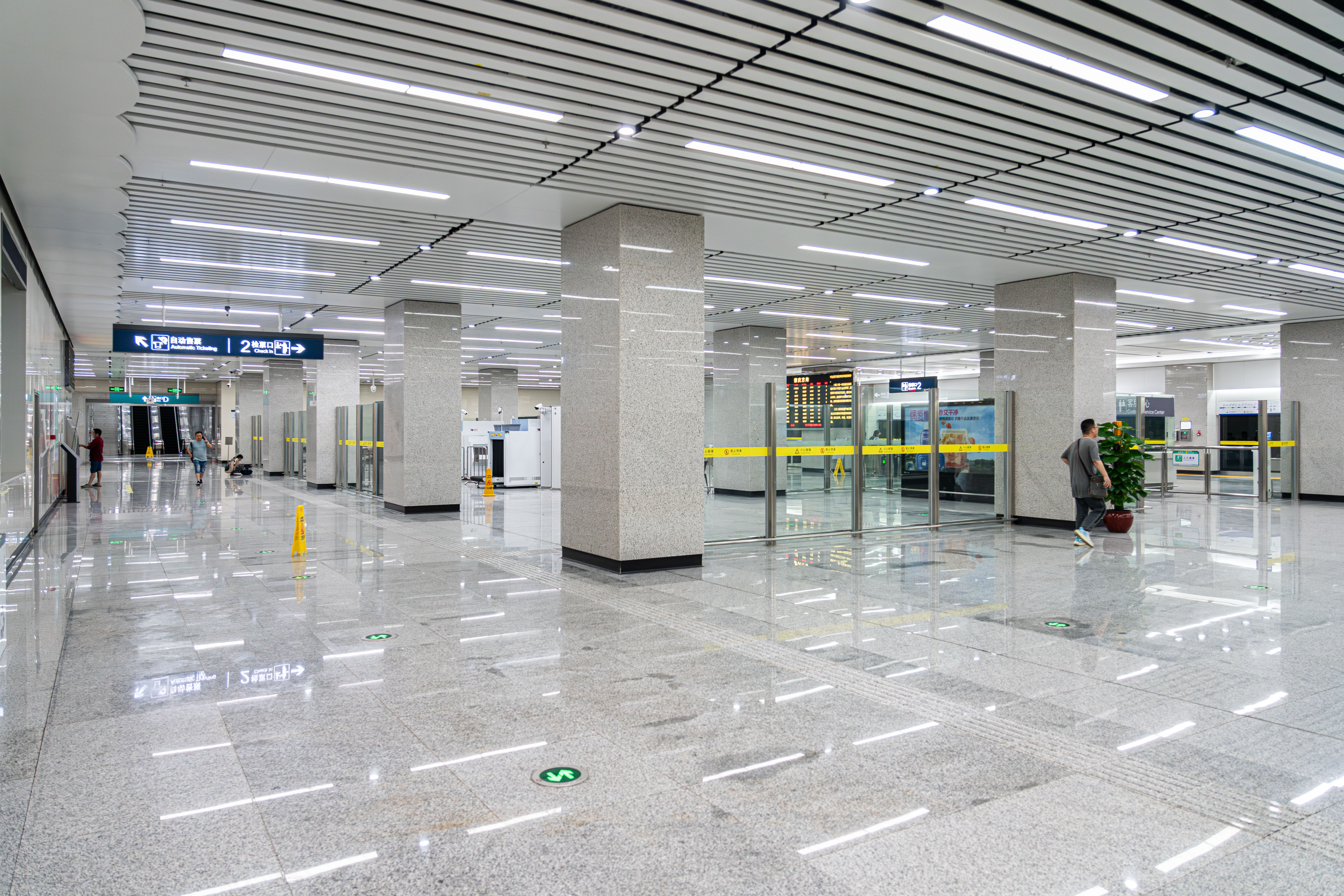
South concourse

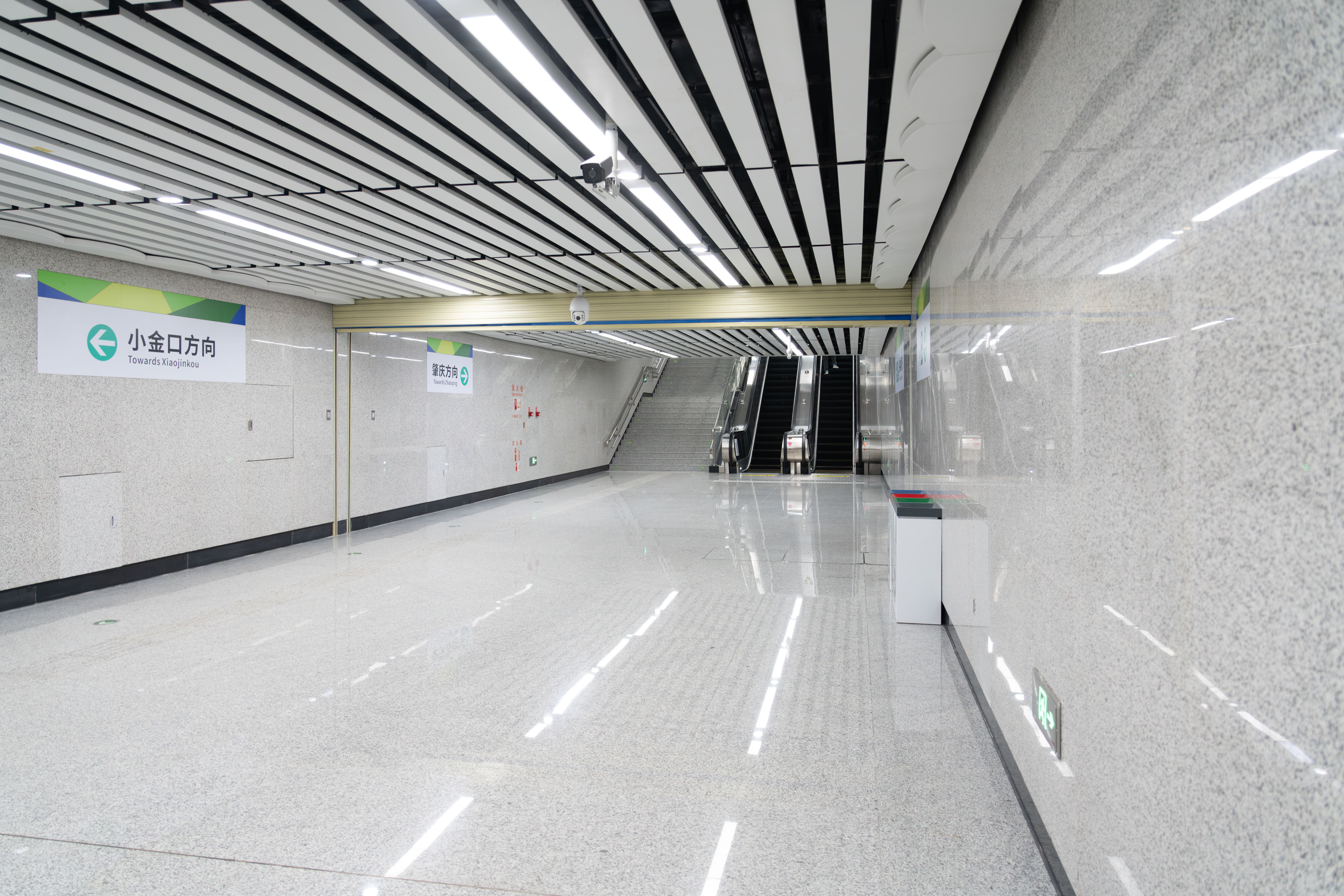
Underpass
