= Chencun =

Chencun (陈村) could refer to 5 township-level settlements in the PRC:

Towns

- Chencun, Foshan, in Shunde District, Foshan, Guangdong
- Chencun, Fengxiang County, in Fengxiang County, Shaanxi
- Chencun, Jiang County, in Jiang County, Shanxi

Townships

- Chencun Township, Mianchi County, in Mianchi County, Henan
- Chencun Township, Jingning She Autonomous County, in Jingning She Autonomous County, Zhejiang
