= Dazhou station =

Dazhou station may refer to:

- Dazhou railway station, in Dazhou, Sichuan Province, China
- Dazhou station (Guangzhou Metro), a station on Line 7 (Guangzhou Metro) in Panyu District, Guangzhou, Guangdong Province, China
- Dazhou station (Zhengzhou Metro), a metro station on Zhengxu line (Line 17) of Zhengzhou Metro, located in Xuchang, Henan Province, China
