= Chencunbei station =

Guangzhou Metro Line 7 station

Chencunbei 陈村北
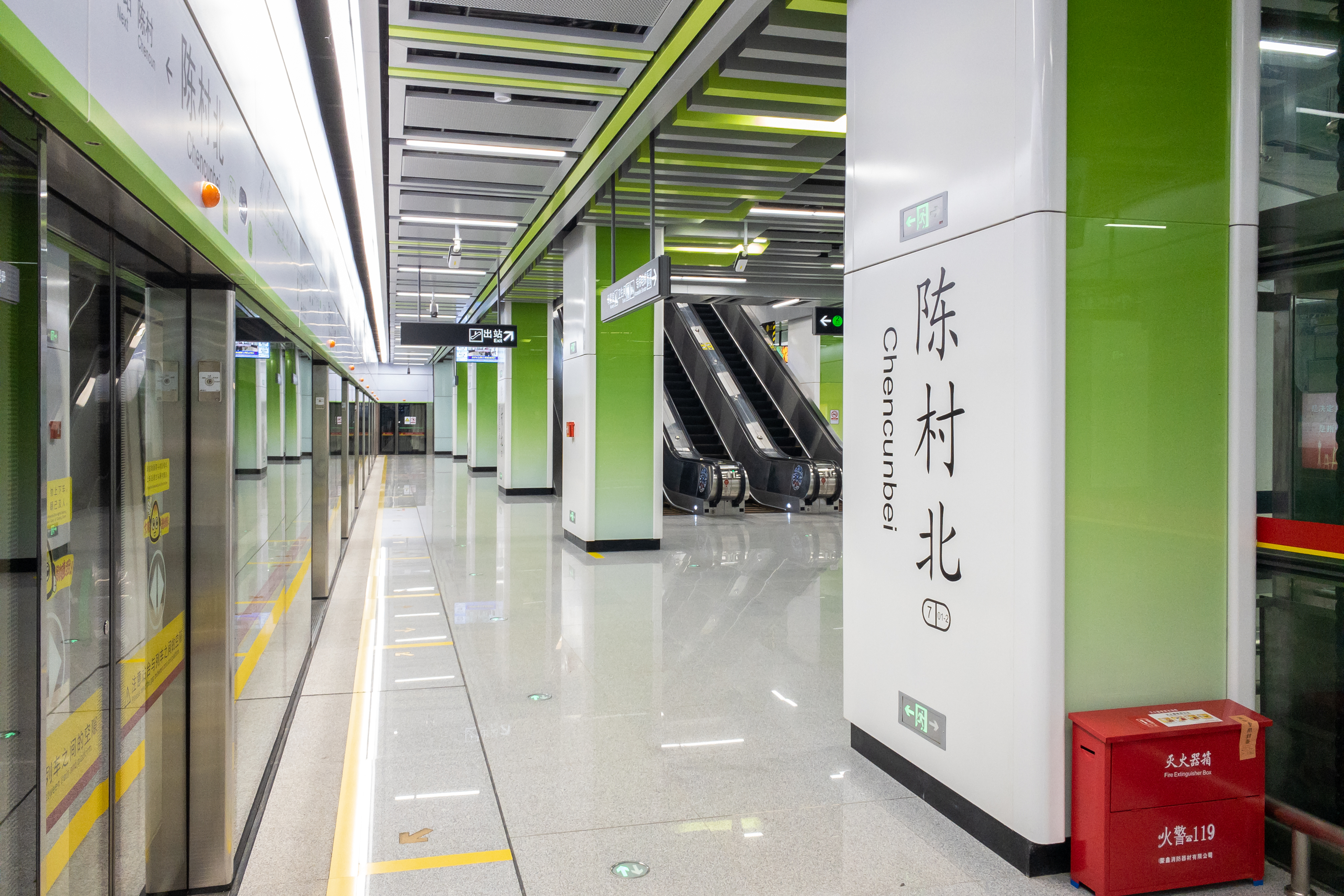
- Platform

Chinese name
- Simplified Chinese: 陈村北站
- Traditional Chinese: 陳村北站
Transcriptions
Standard Mandarin
- Hanyu Pinyin: Chéncūnběi Zhàn
Yue: Cantonese
- Yale Romanization: Chàhnchyūn Bāk Jaahm
- Jyutping: Can^{4}tsuen^{4} Bak^{1} Zaam^{6}

General information
- Location: Between Guangzhu West Expressway (广珠西线高速公路) and Huanzhen East Road (环镇东路), Chencun Subdistrict, Shunde District, Foshan, Guangdong; China
- Coordinates: 22°58′41.99″N 113°14′22.20″E
- Operator: Guangzhou Metro Group
- Lines: Line 7; Line 11 (future)
- Platforms: 2 (1 island platform)
- Tracks: 2

Construction
- Structure type: Underground
- Accessible: Yes

Other information
- Station code: 701-2

History
- Opened: 1 May 2022 (4 years ago)

Services
Preceding station	Guangzhou Metro	Following station
Chencun towards Meidi Dadao	Line 7	Dazhou towards Yanshan
Location

Chencunbei Station (simplified Chinese: 陈村北站; traditional Chinese: 陳村北站; pinyin: Chéncūnběi Zhàn; Cantonese Yale: Chàhnchyūn Bāk Jaahm) is a station on Line 7 of Guangzhou Metro, located underground between Guangzhu West Expressway and Huanzhen East Road in Foshan's Shunde District. The station was opened on 1 May 2022, with the opening of the western extension of Line 7.

This is the first station in Foshan's Shunde District when travelling westbound on Line 7.

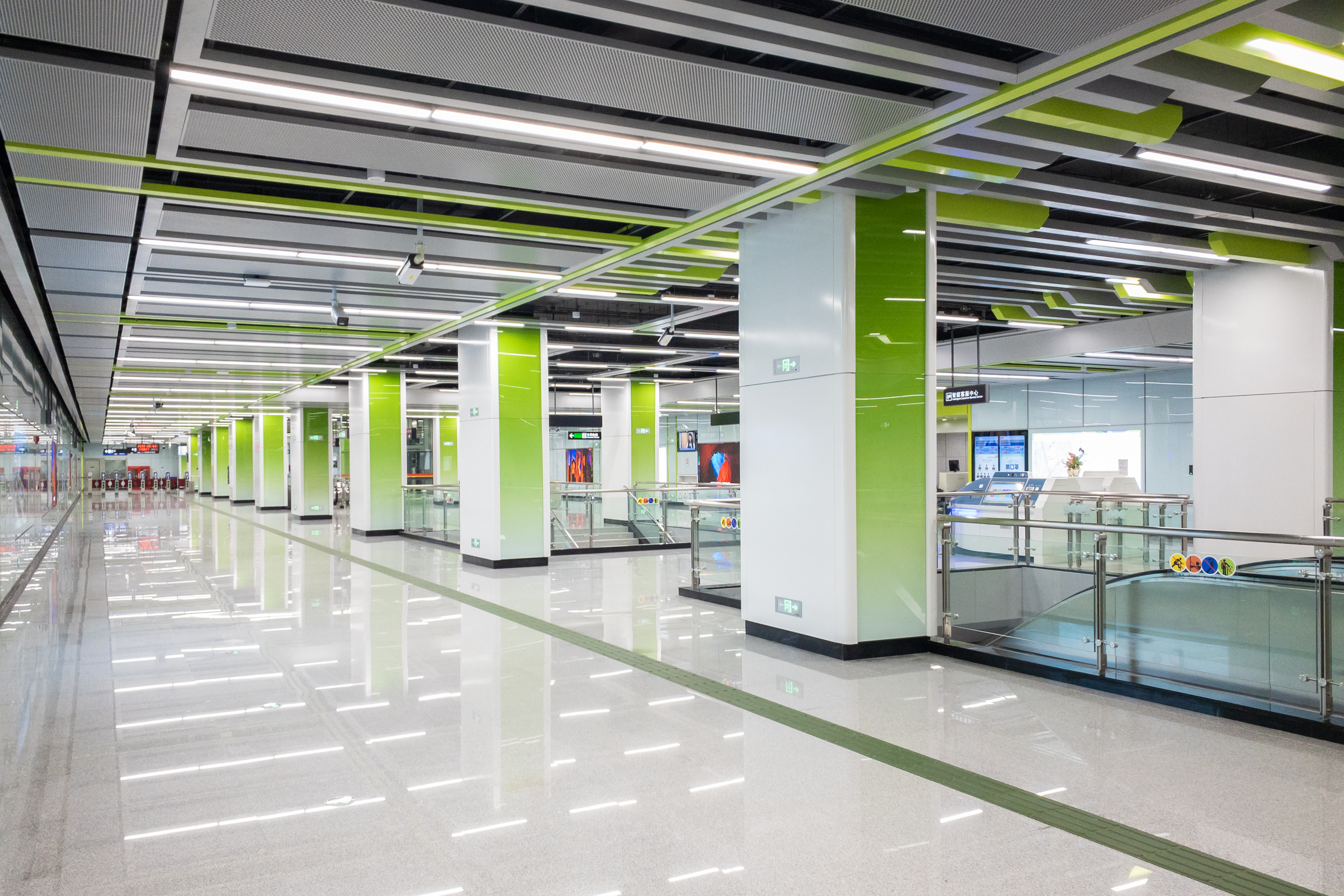
Concourse

== Station layout ==
G	Street level	Exits B, F
L1; Concourse	Lobby	Ticket Machines, Customer Service, Shops, Police Station, Security Facilities
L2; Equipment Area	Equipment Area	Station Equipment
L2; Equipment Area		11 reserved track area
L2; Equipment Area	Reserved island platform
L2; Equipment Area		11 reserved track area
L3; Platforms	Platform 2	7 towards Meidi Dadao (Chencun)
L3; Platforms	Island platform, doors will open on the left (Toilets, Nursery)
L3; Platforms	Platform 1	7 towards Yanshan (Dazhou)

=== Entrances/exits ===
The station has 2 points of entry/exit. Exit B is equipped with an elevator.

- B: Huanzhen East Road
- F: Huanzhen East Road
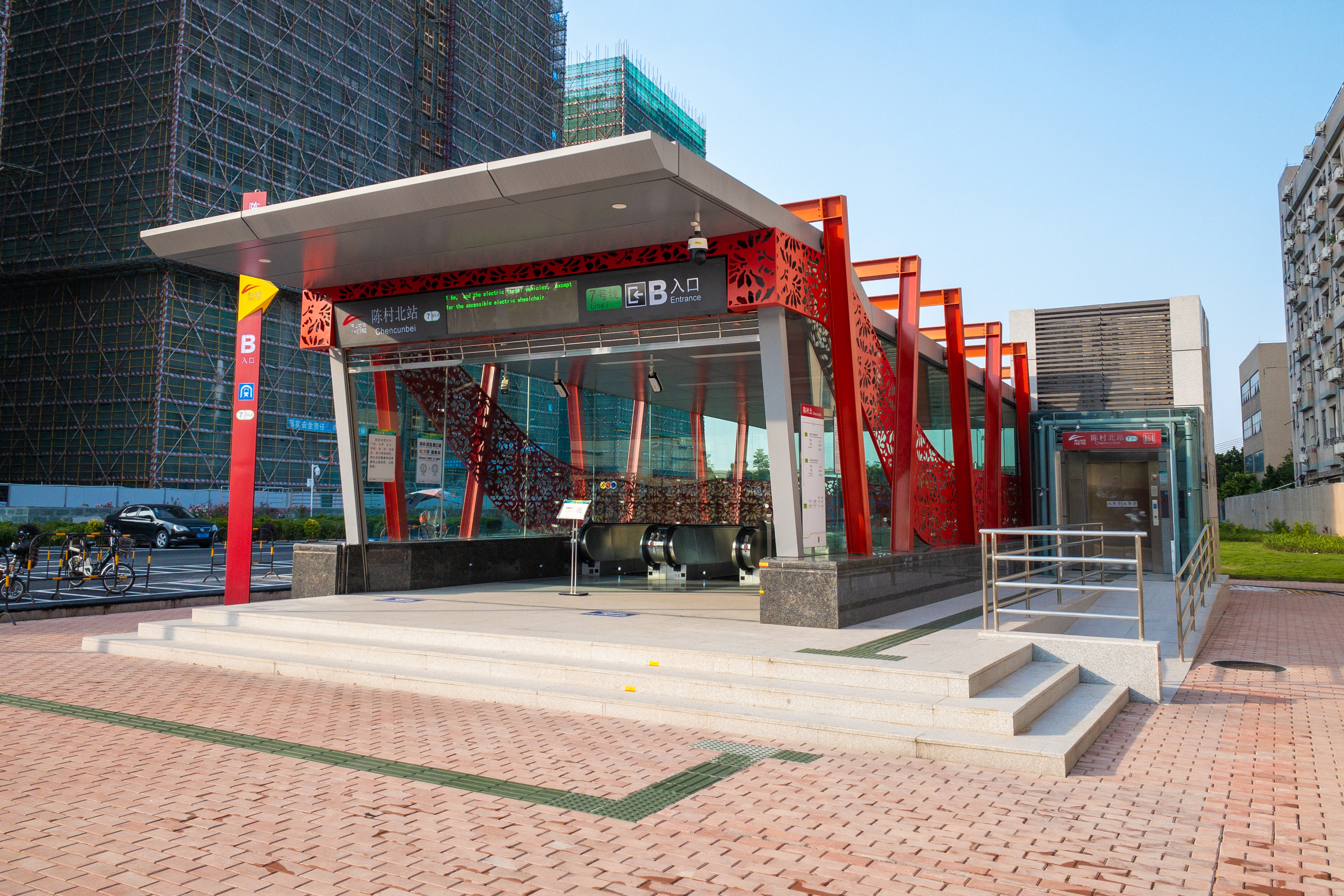
Entrance B

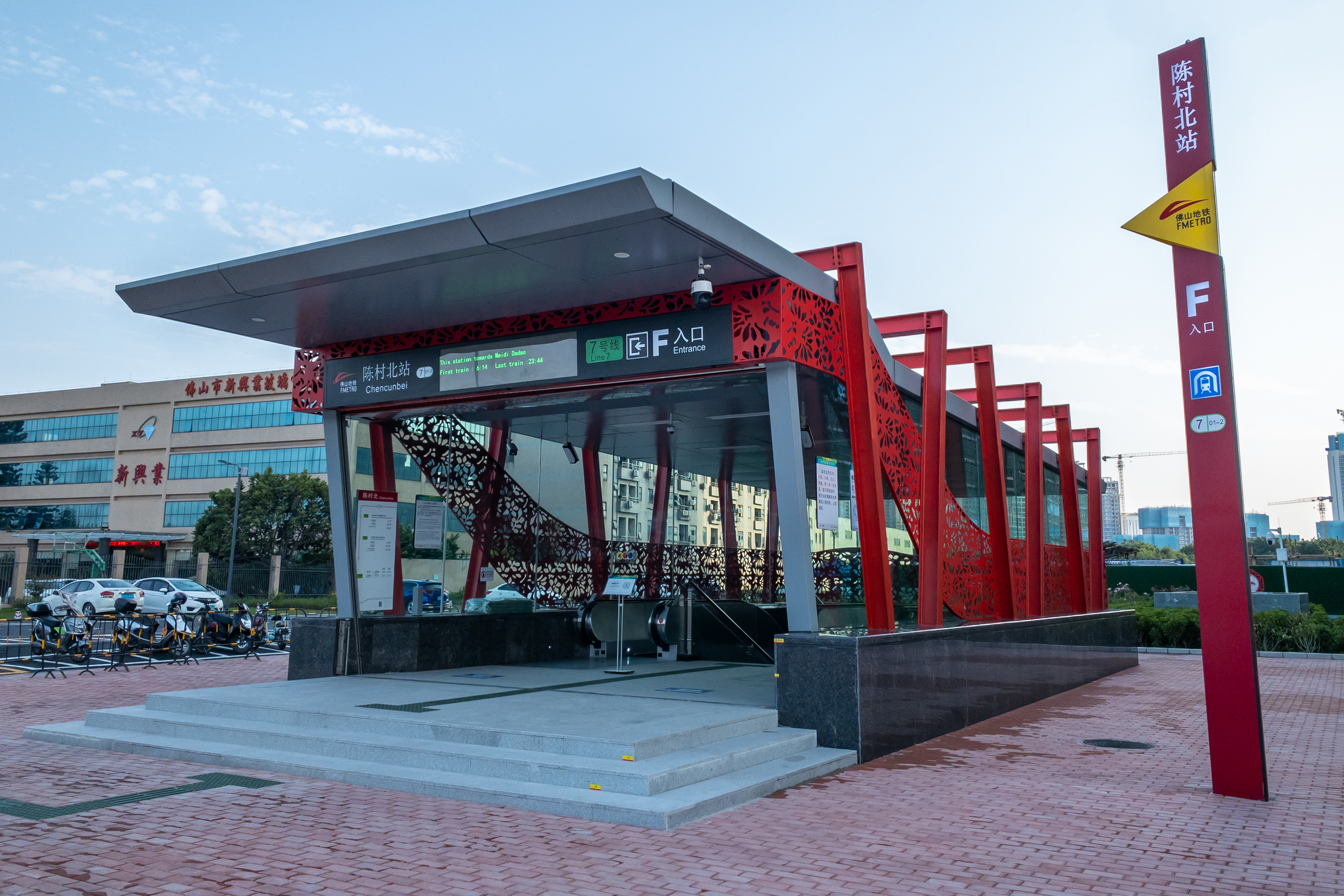
Entrance F

== History ==
In the early stage of the planning of the western extension of Guangzhou Line 7, this station was not set up. However, later on, Line 11 was added to the planning of Foshan's rail transit network, and this station was added to the western extension of Guangzhou Line 7 to cooperate with the transfer with Line 11. The stations are uniformly designed and will be built in phases.

The station completed the "three rights" transfer on 12 November 2021. It opened on 1 May 2022 with the western extension of Line 7.

During COVID-19 pandemic control rules at the end of 2022, due to the impact of prevention and control measures, station service was suspended from 28 to the afternoon of 30 November 2022.

== Future development ==
The station is planned to be an interchange with Foshan Metro Line 11. Part of the station structure of Foshan Line 11 has been reserved during construction, forming a 90 degree "T" shape with the Guangzhou Line 7 platforms. At present, the east end of the platform of Guangzhou Line 7 has a reserved node, and escalators and stairs will be added to connect to the Foshan Line 11 platforms in the future.
