= Chencun station (Guangzhou Metro) =

Guangzhou Metro Line 7 station

Chencun 陈村
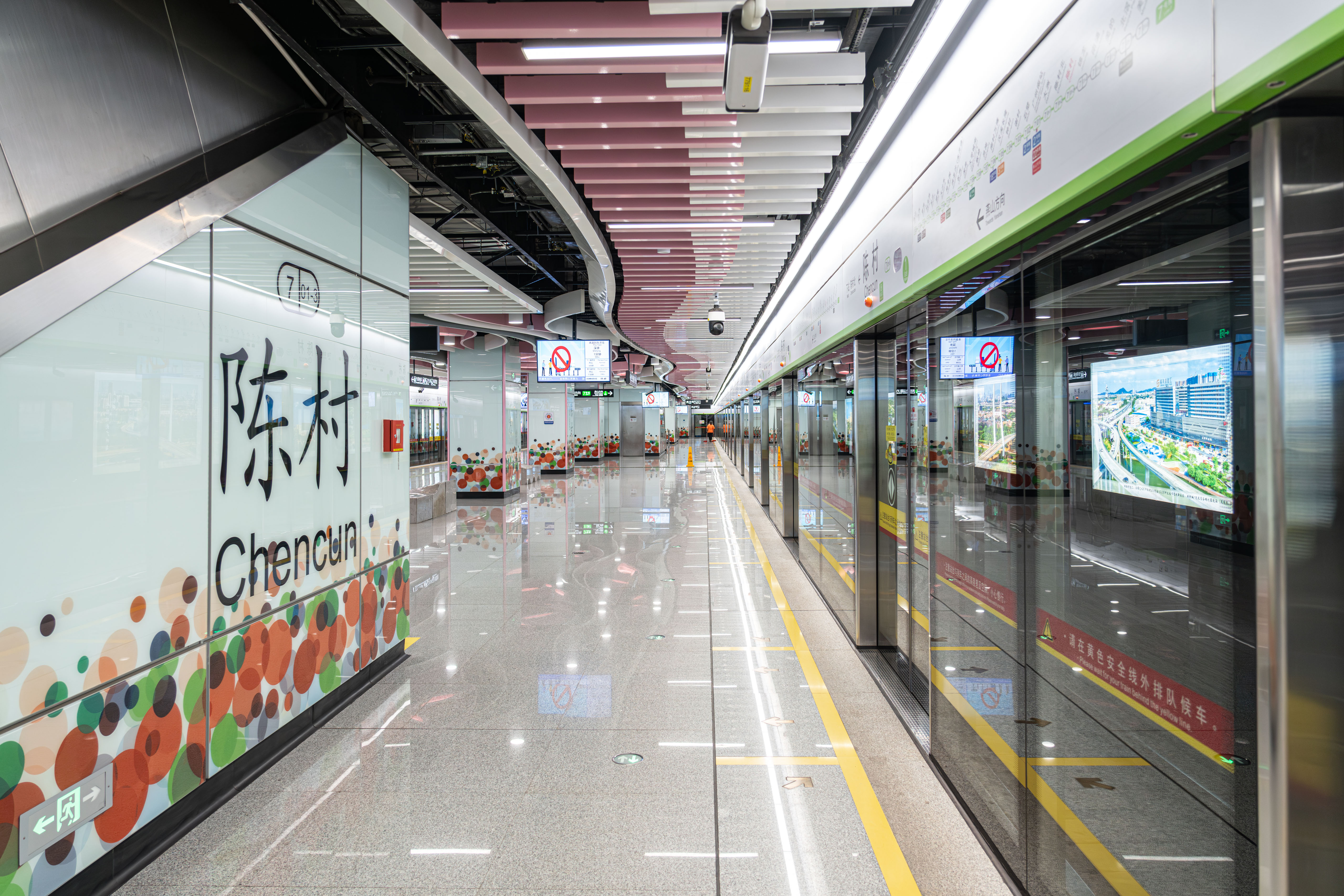
- Platform

Chinese name
- Simplified Chinese: 陈村站
- Traditional Chinese: 陳村站
Transcriptions
Standard Mandarin
- Hanyu Pinyin: Chéncūn Zhàn
Yue: Cantonese
- Yale Romanization: Chàhnchyūn Jaahm
- Jyutping: Can^{4}tsuen^{4} Zaam^{6}

General information
- Location: South side of the intersection of Chencun Avenue (陈村大道) and Baichen Road (白陈路), Chencun Subdistrict, Shunde District, Foshan, Guangdong; China
- Coordinates: 22°58′15.72″N 113°13′53.18″E
- Operator: Guangzhou Metro Group
- Line: Line 7
- Platforms: 2 (1 island platform)
- Tracks: 2
- Connections: Chencun

Construction
- Structure type: Underground
- Accessible: Yes

Other information
- Station code: 701-3

History
- Opened: 1 May 2022 (4 years ago)

Services
Preceding station	Guangzhou Metro	Following station
Jinlong towards Meidi Dadao	Line 7	Chencunbei towards Yanshan
Transfer at Chencun
Preceding station	Pearl River Delta Metropolitan Region Intercity Railway	Following station
Beijiao West towards Zhaoqing	Guangzhou–Zhaoqing intercity railway transfer at Chencun	Panyu Terminus
Location

Chencun Station (simplified Chinese: 陈村站; traditional Chinese: 陳村站; pinyin: Chéncūn Zhàn; Cantonese Yale: Chàhnchyūn Jaahm) is a station on Line 7 of Guangzhou Metro, located underground on the south side of the intersection of Chencun Avenue and Baichen Road in Foshan's Shunde District. The station was opened on 1 May 2022, with the opening of the western extension of Line 7.

== Concourse features ==
The station concourse is one of the featured themed stations on the western Shunde extension of Line 7, with the theme "The First Land of Enlightenment, Thousand Years of Flowers". To show the characteristics of Chencun Town's "Millennium Flower Township", the station is decorated with the elements of Chencun Cymbidium, including the bright colors of the walls and columns and the petal lines of the ceiling. As Chencun Town is the birthplace of the author of Three Character Classic, the station displays some of its classic sentences.

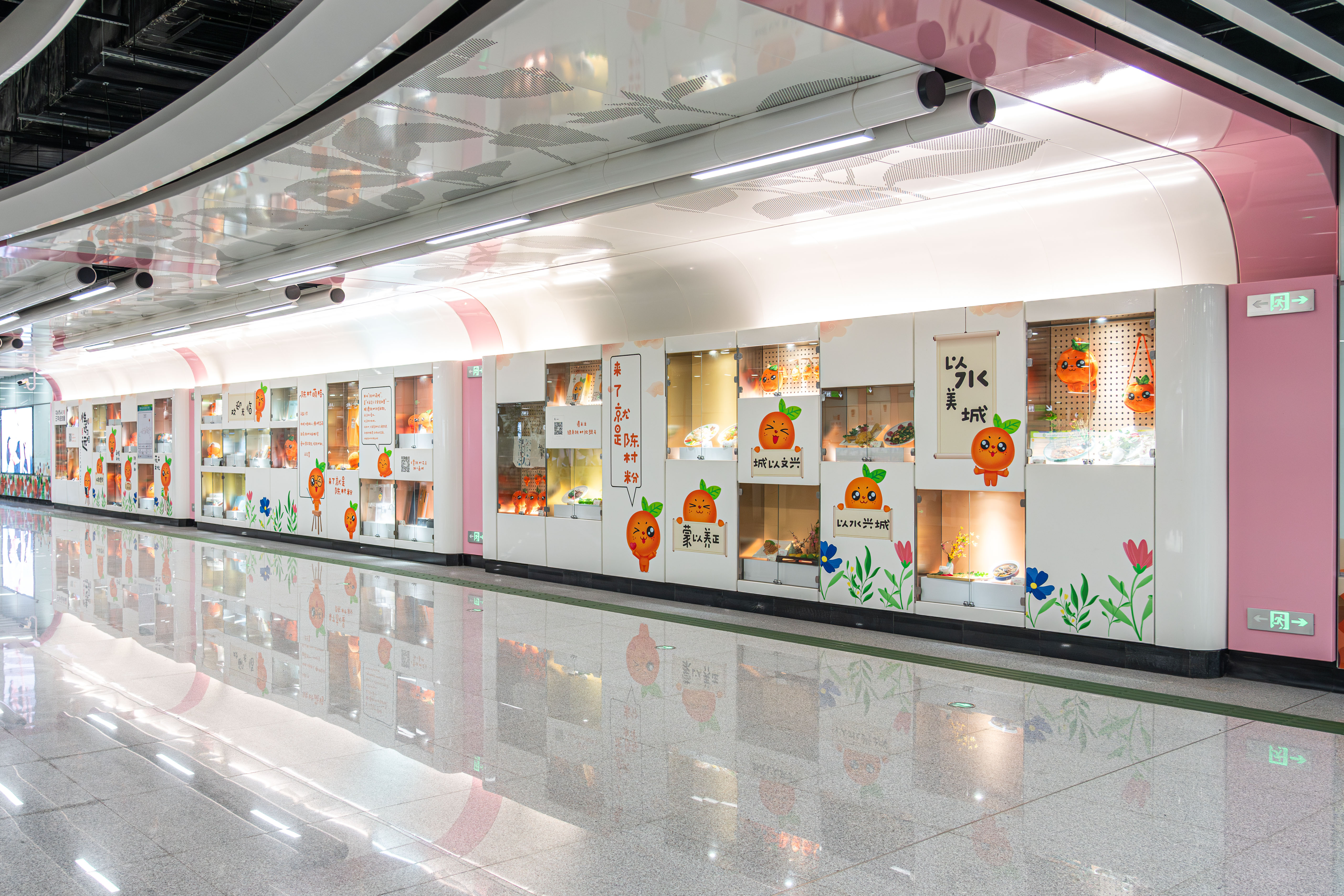
Culture wall

== Station layout ==
G	Street level	Exits A, C
L1; Concourse	Lobby	Ticket Machines, Customer Service, Shops, Police Station, Security Facilities; Transfer passageway to Chencun railway station (construction suspended)
L2; Platforms	Platform 2	7 towards Meidi Dadao (Jinlong)
L2; Platforms	Island platform, doors will open on the left (Toilets, Nursery)
L2; Platforms	Platform 1	7 towards Yanshan (Chencunbei)

=== Entrances/exits ===
The station has 2 points of entry/exit. There is also an unassigned elevator entrance/exit.

- A: Chencun Avenue
- C: Chencun Avenue
- Elevator entrance/exit
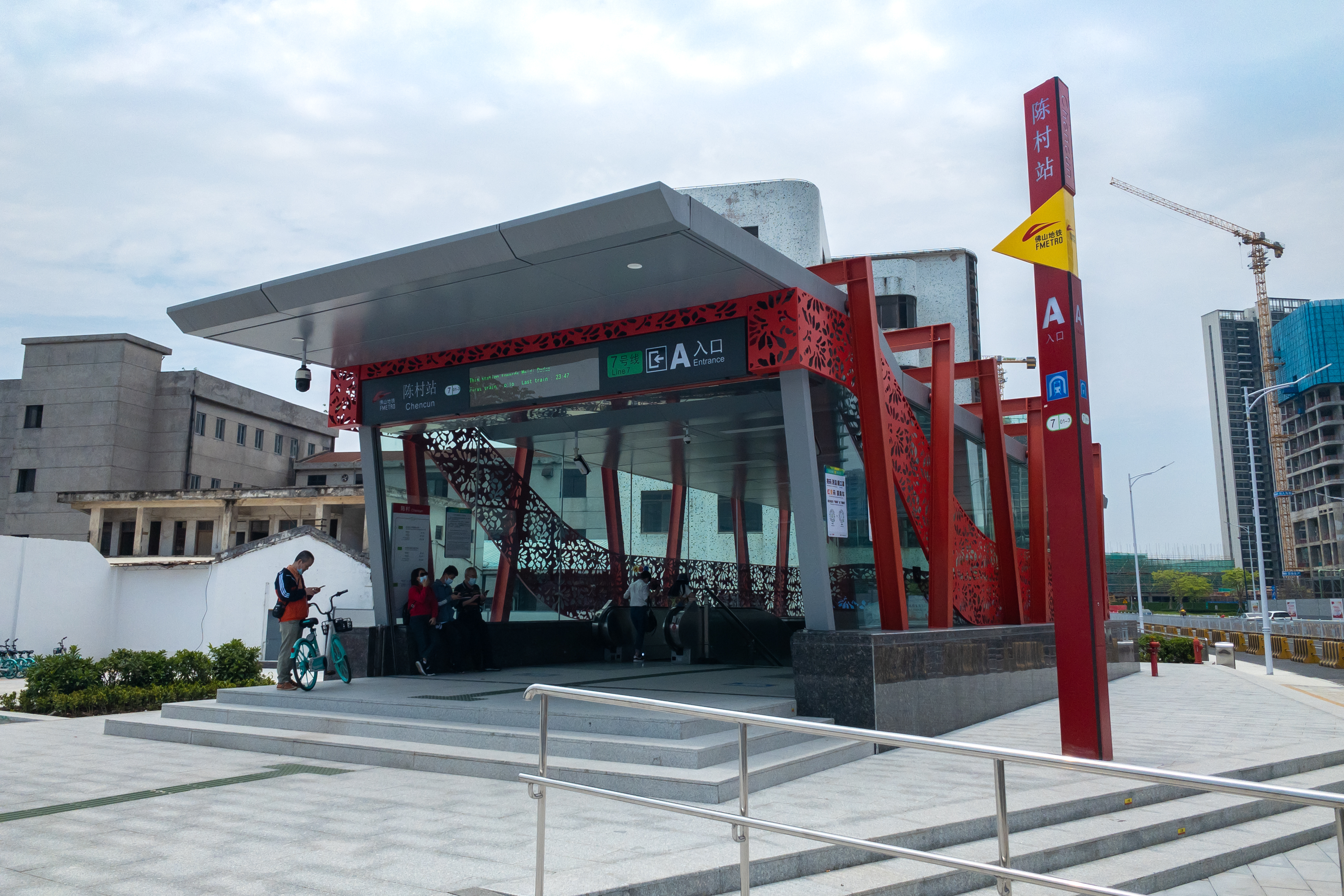
Entrance A

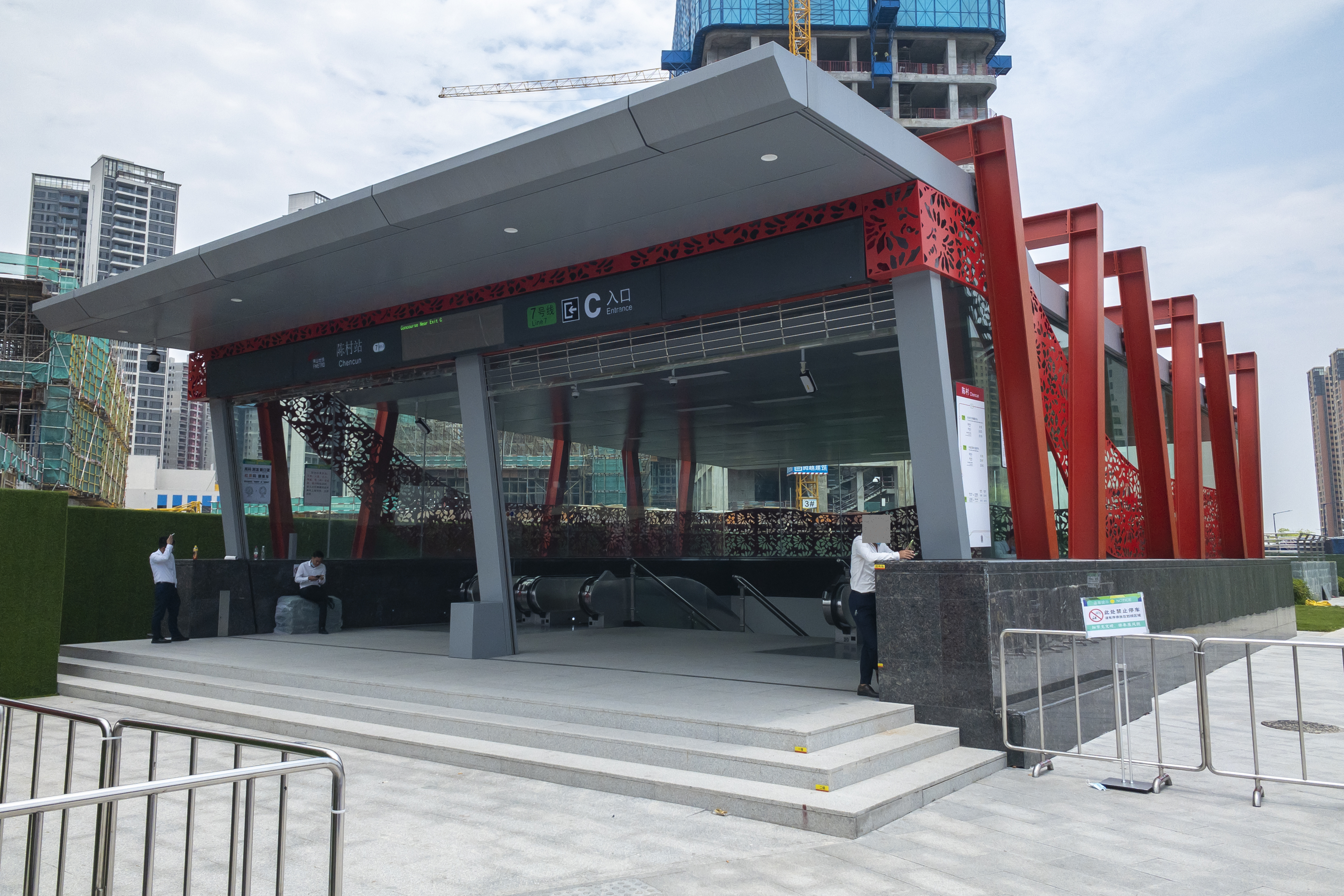
Entrance C

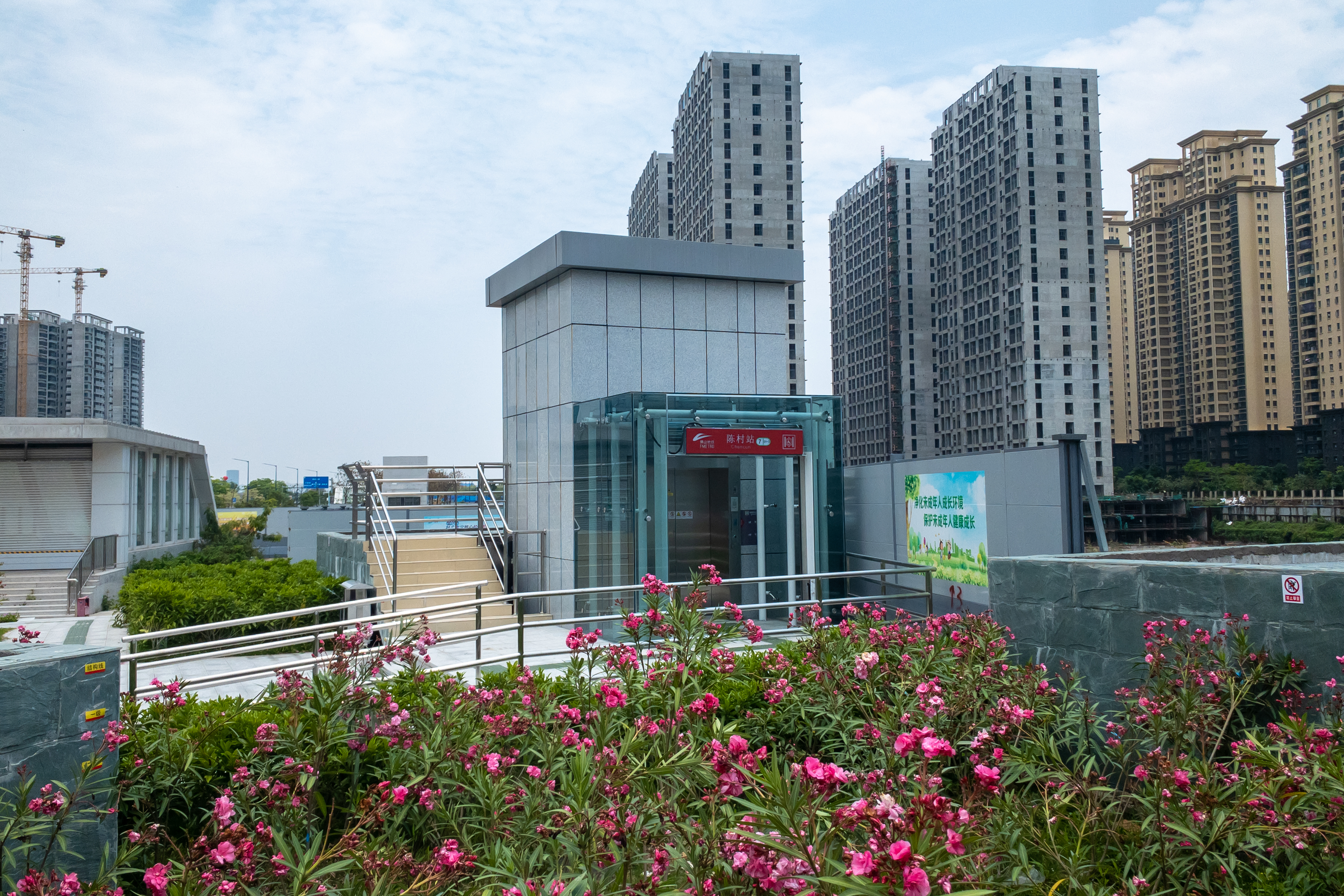
Elevator

== Gallery ==
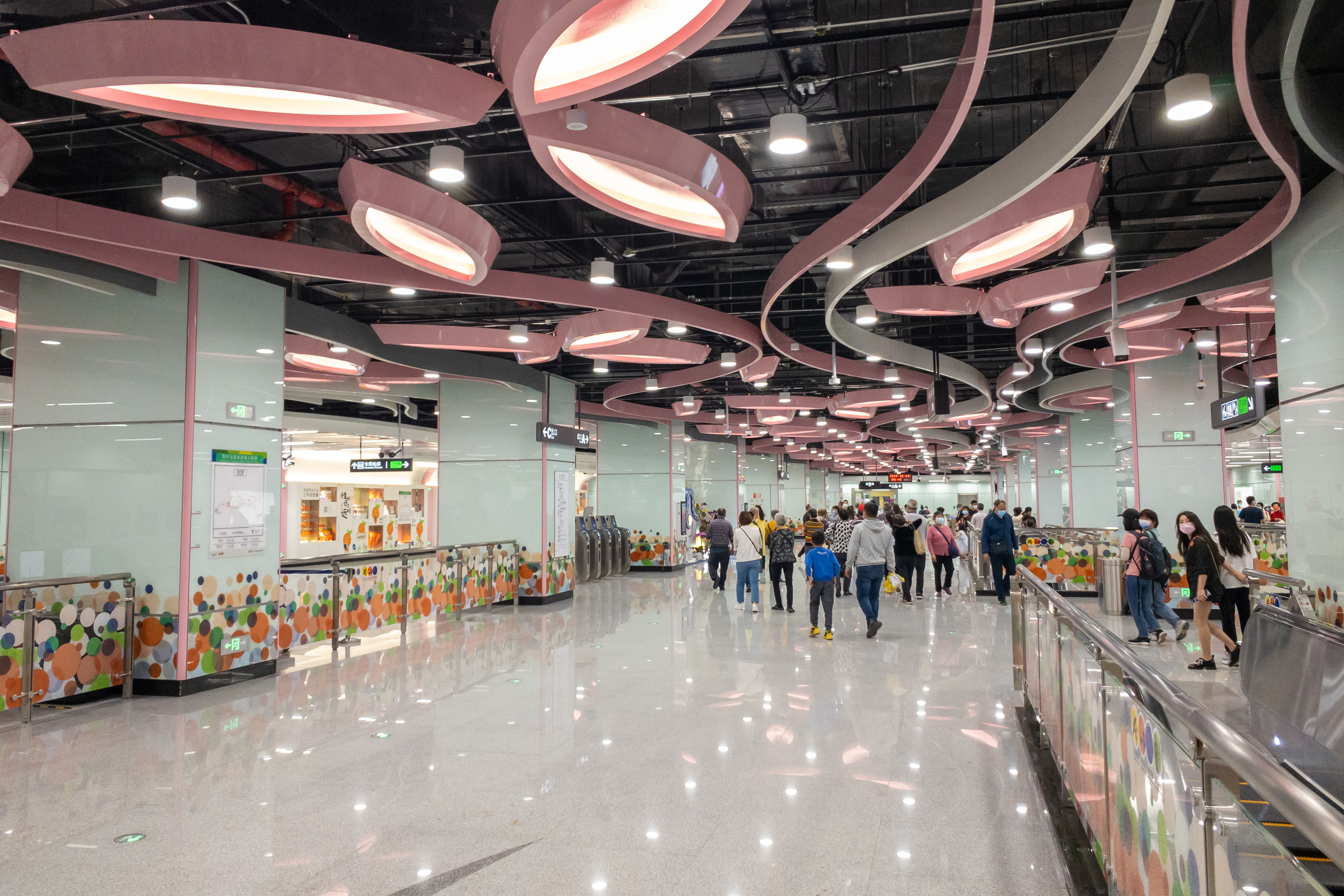
Concourse

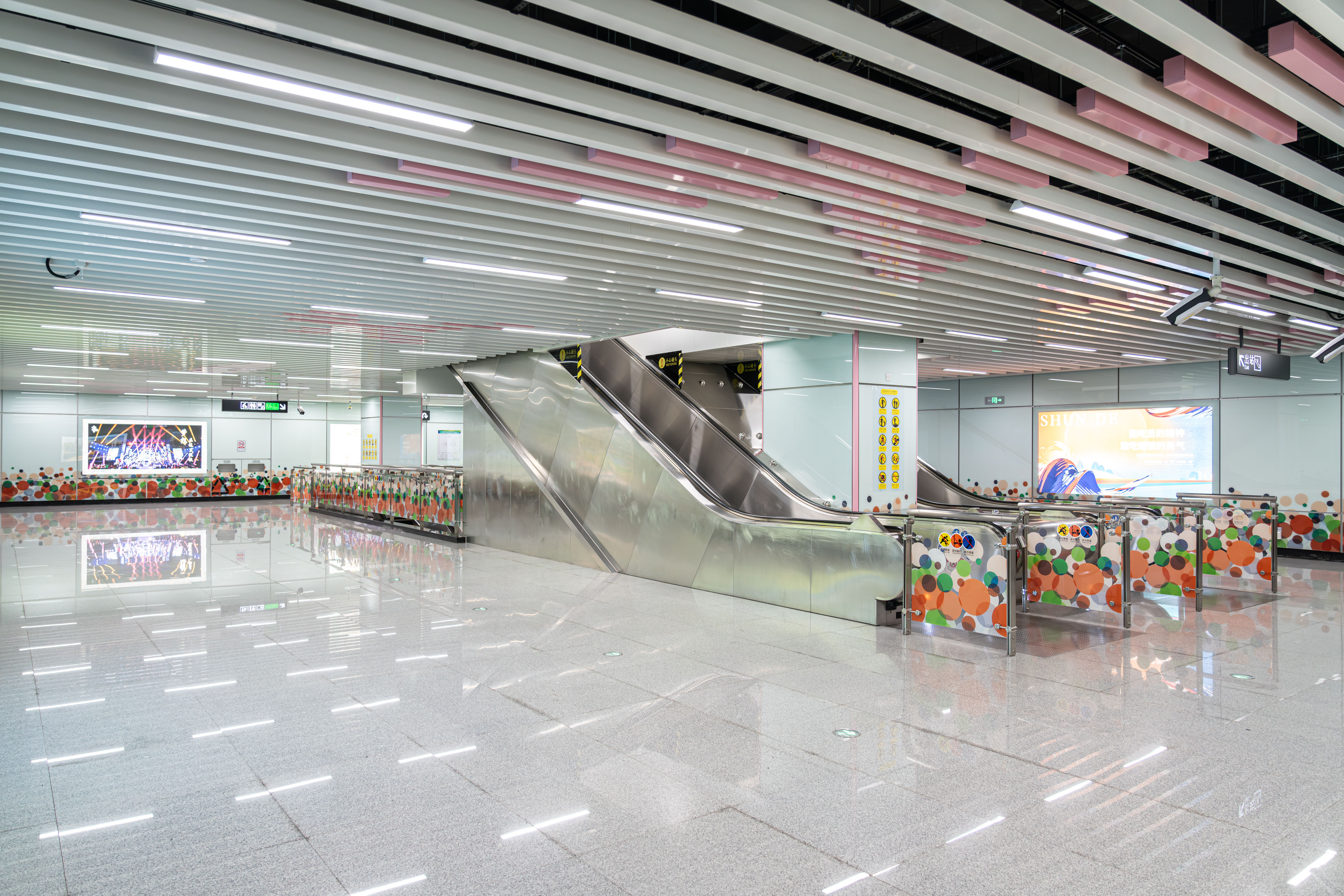
Buffer area

== History ==
This station was the starting target of the Shunde section of Guangzhou Metro Line 7 west extension. On 19 September 2018, the station successfully topped out. It opened on 1 May 2022 with the western extension of Line 7.

During COVID-19 pandemic control rules at the end of 2022, due to the impact of prevention and control measures, station service was suspended from 28 to the afternoon of 30 November 2022.
