= Jinlong station (Guangzhou Metro) =

Guangzhou Metro Line 7 station

Jinlong 锦龙
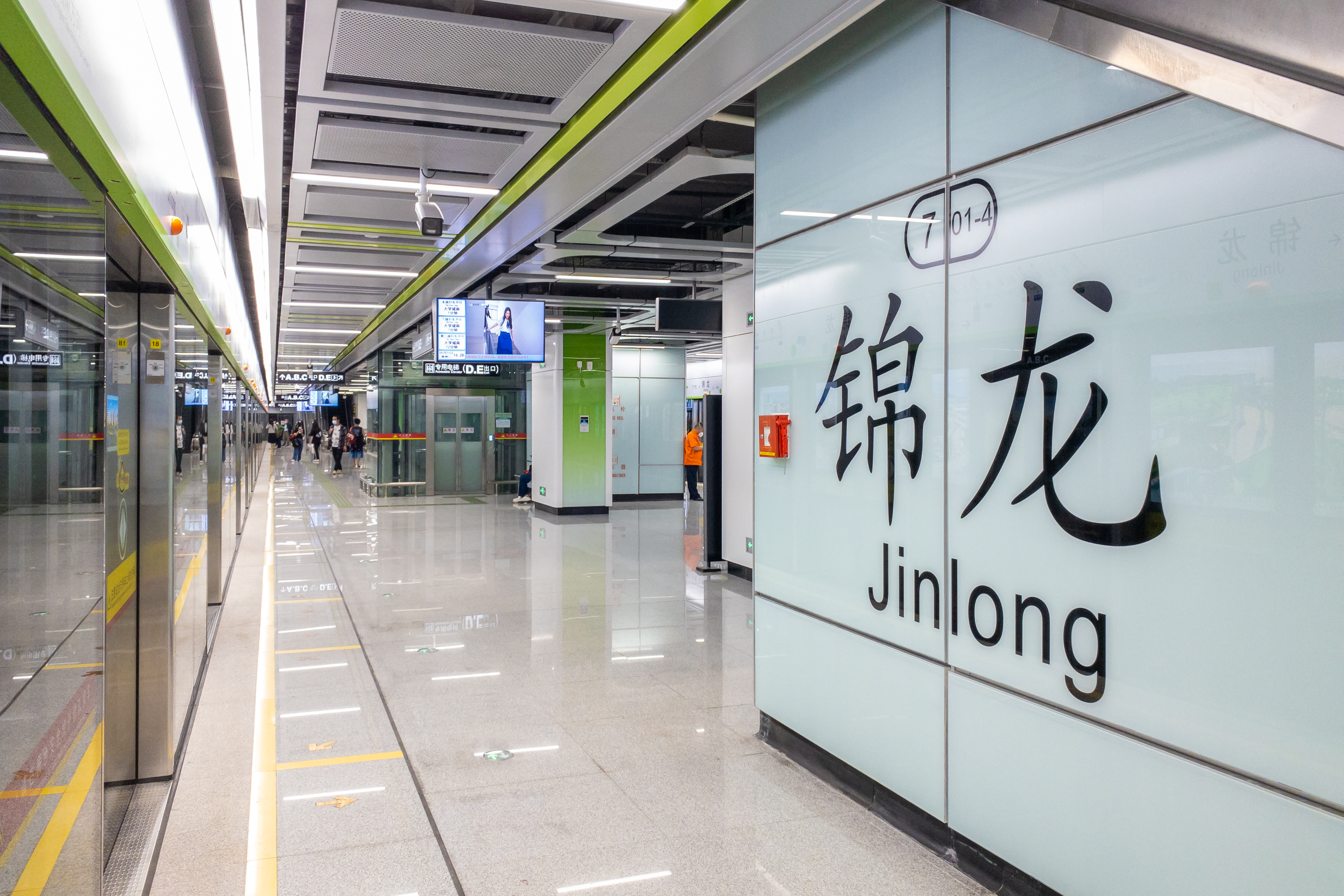
- Platform

Chinese name
- Simplified Chinese: 锦龙站
- Traditional Chinese: 錦龍站
Transcriptions
Standard Mandarin
- Hanyu Pinyin: Jǐnlóng Zhàn
Yue: Cantonese
- Yale Romanization: Gámlùhng Jaahm
- Jyutping: Gam^{2}lung^{4} Zaam^{6}

General information
- Location: Intersection of Fochen Avenue (佛陈大道) and Baichen Road (白陈路), Chencun Subdistrict, Shunde District, Foshan, Guangdong; China
- Coordinates: 22°57′24.44″N 113°14′8.99″E
- Operator: Guangzhou Metro Group
- Line: Line 7
- Platforms: 2 (1 island platform)
- Tracks: 2

Construction
- Structure type: Underground
- Accessible: Yes

Other information
- Station code: 701-4

History
- Opened: 1 May 2022 (4 years ago)
- Former names: Chencun New Town (陈村新城)

Services
| Preceding station | Guangzhou Metro | Following station |
|---|---|---|
| Nanchong towards Meidi Dadao | Line 7 | Chencun towards Yanshan |
Location

Jinlong Station (simplified Chinese: 锦龙站; traditional Chinese: 錦龍站; pinyin: Jǐnlóng Zhàn; Cantonese Yale: Gámlùhng Jaahm) is a station on Line 7 of Guangzhou Metro, located underground at the intersection of Fochen Avenue and Baichen Road in Foshan's Shunde District. The station was opened on 1 May 2022, with the opening of the western extension of Line 7.

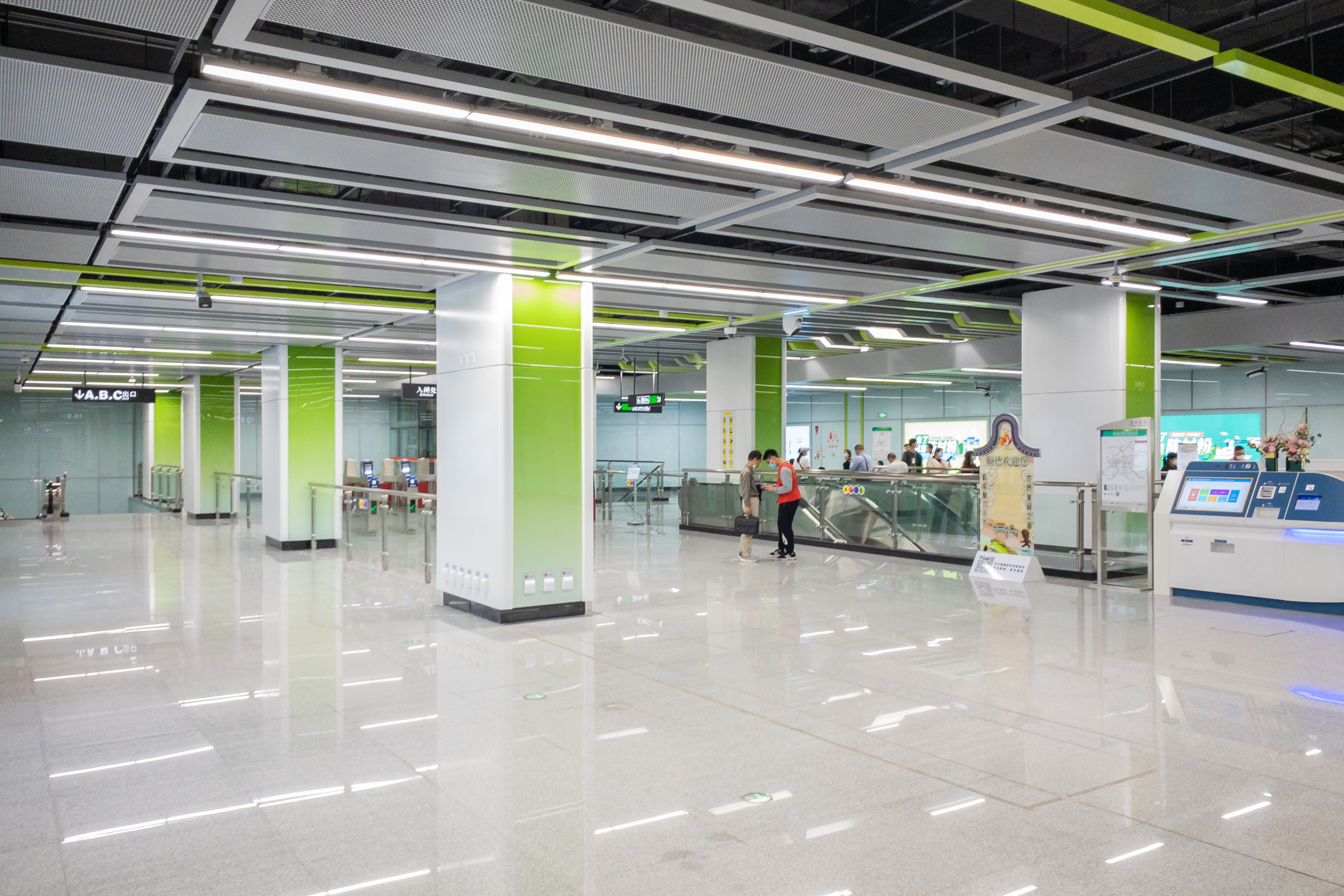
North concourse

== Station layout ==
| G | Street level | Exits A-E |
| L1; Concourse | North lobby | Ticket Machines, Customer Service, Shops, Police Station, Security Facilities |
| L1; Concourse | | (Chencun tunnel) |
| L1; Concourse | South lobby | Ticket Machines, Customer Service, Shops, Police Station, Security Facilities |
| L2; Platforms | Platform 2 | 7 towards Meidi Dadao (Nanchong) |
| L2; Platforms | Island platform, doors will open on the left (Toilets, Nursery) |
| L2; Platforms | Platform 1 | 7 towards Yanshan (Chencun) |

=== Entrances/exits ===
The station has 5 points of entry/exit, split between the south and north concourses. Exits A and E are equipped with elevators.

==== South concourse ====
- A: Chencun Avenue
- B: Chencun Avenue
- C: Fochen Road

==== North concourse ====
- D: Fochen Road
- E: Chencun Avenue
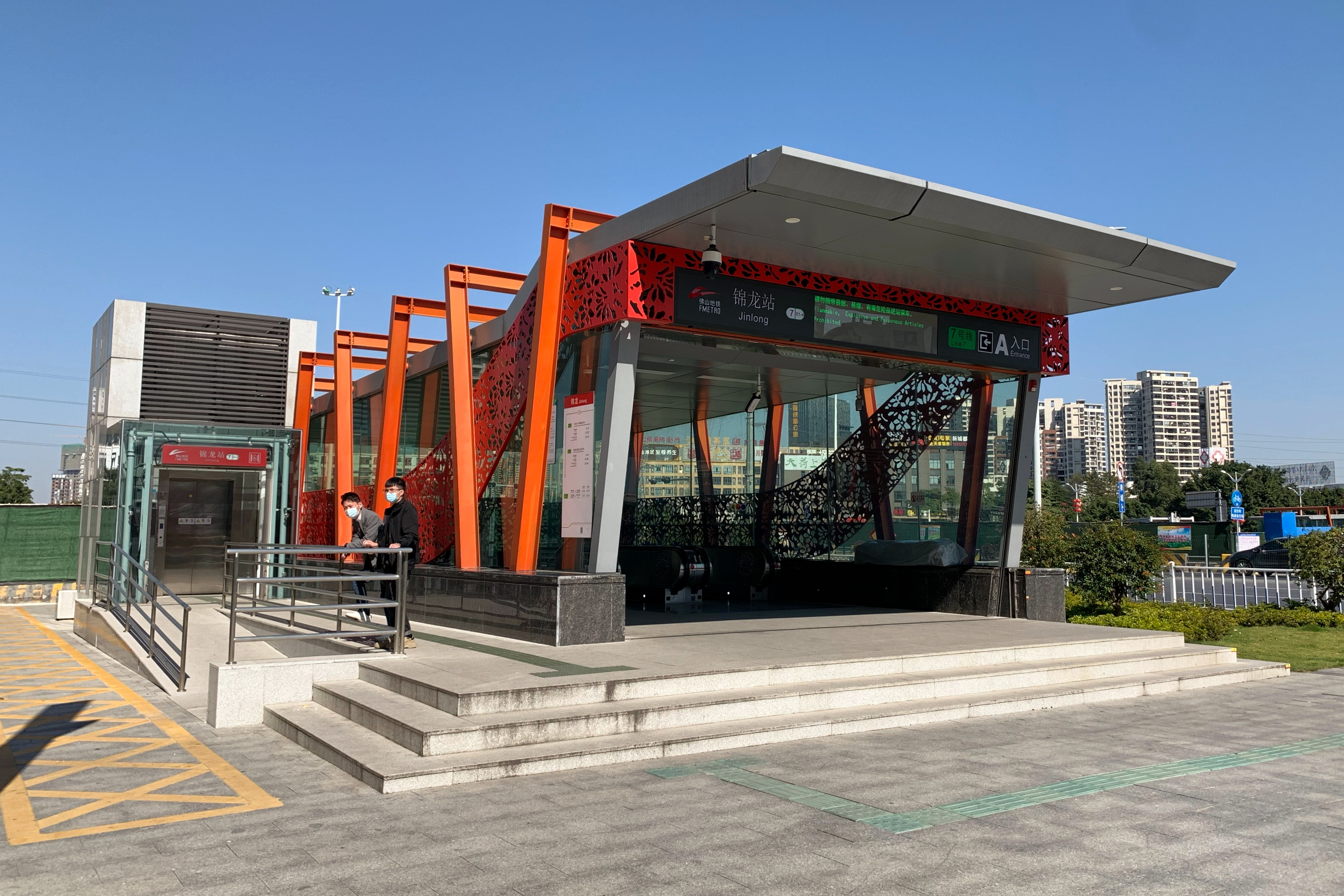
Entrance A

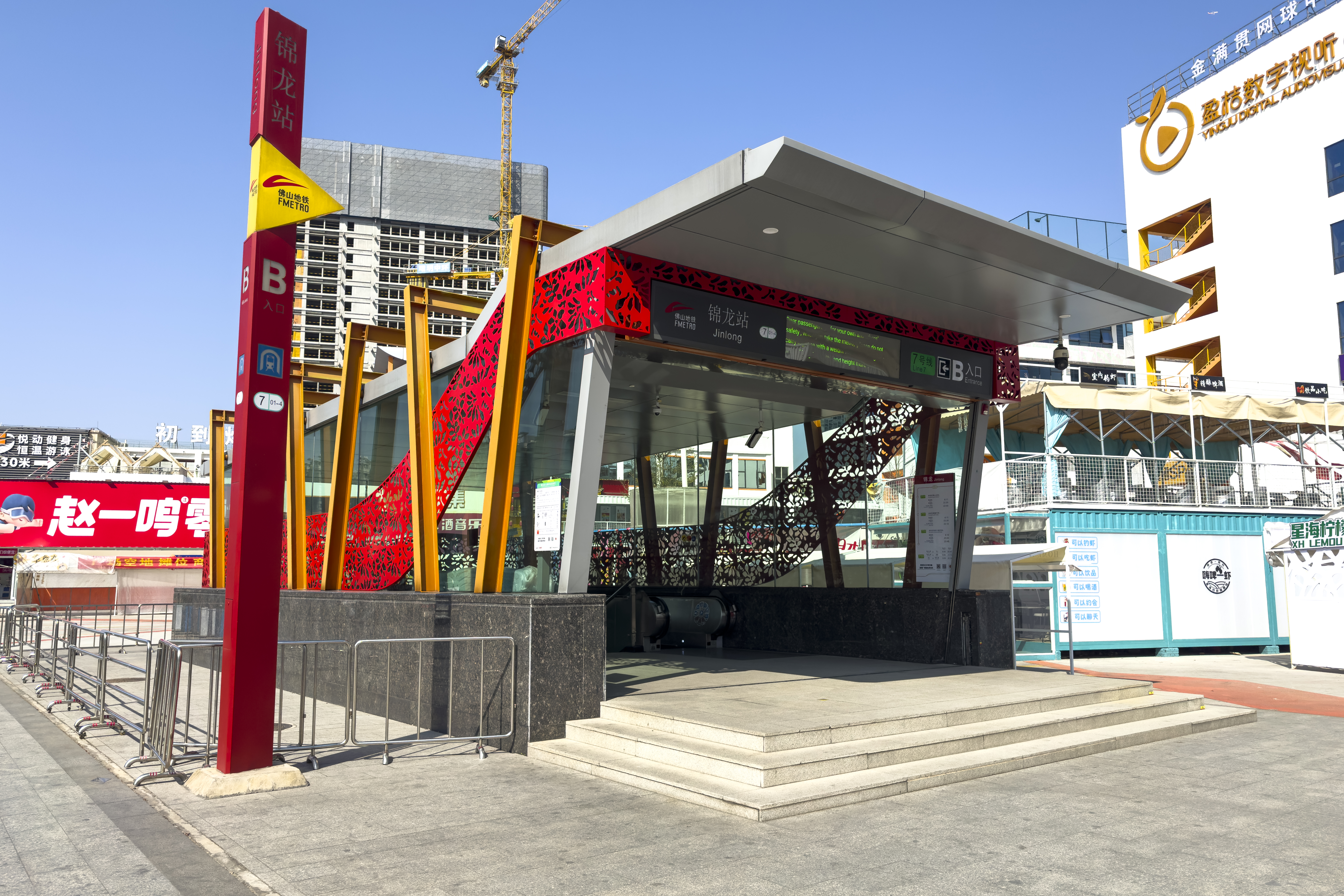
Entrance B

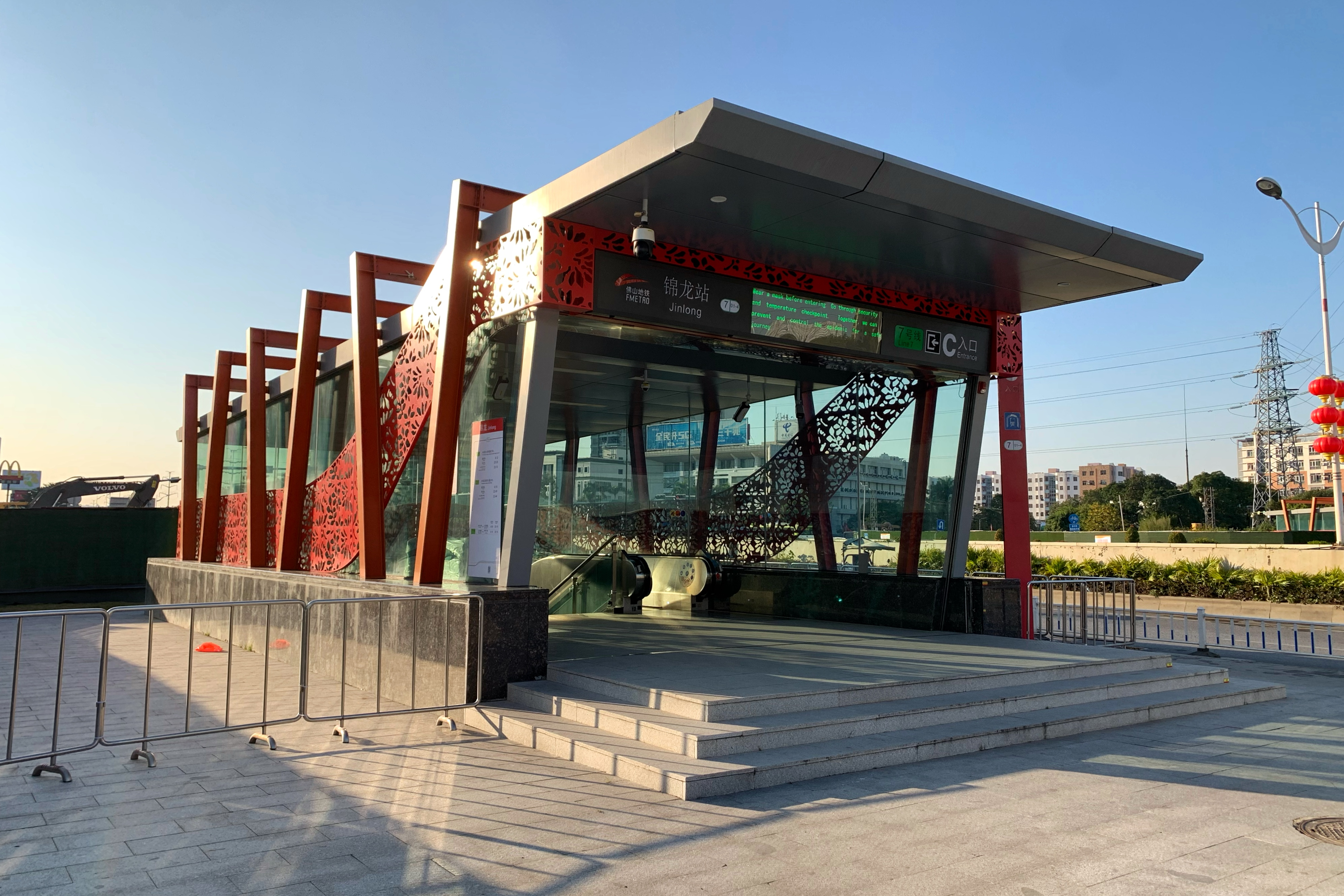
Entrance C

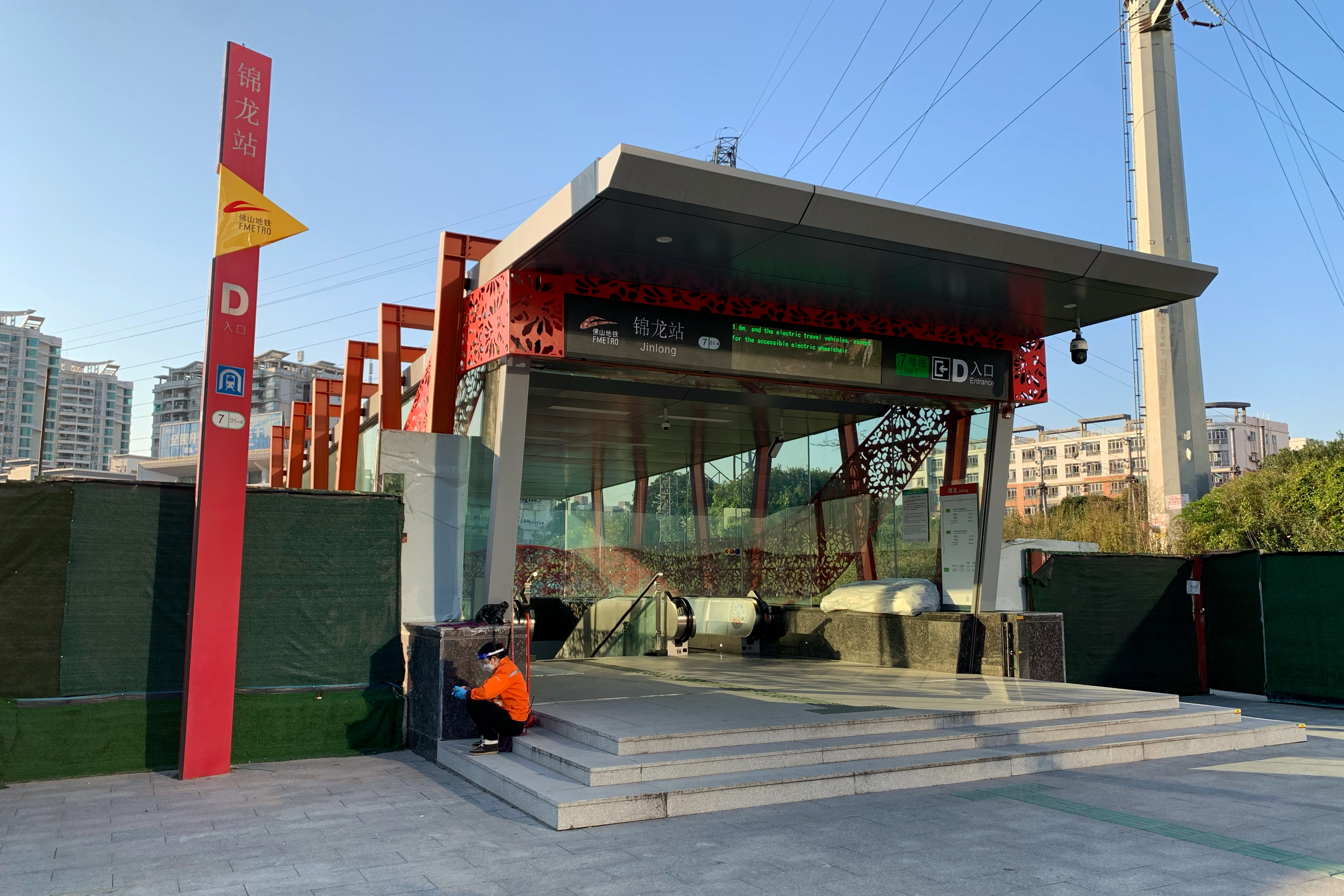
Entrance D

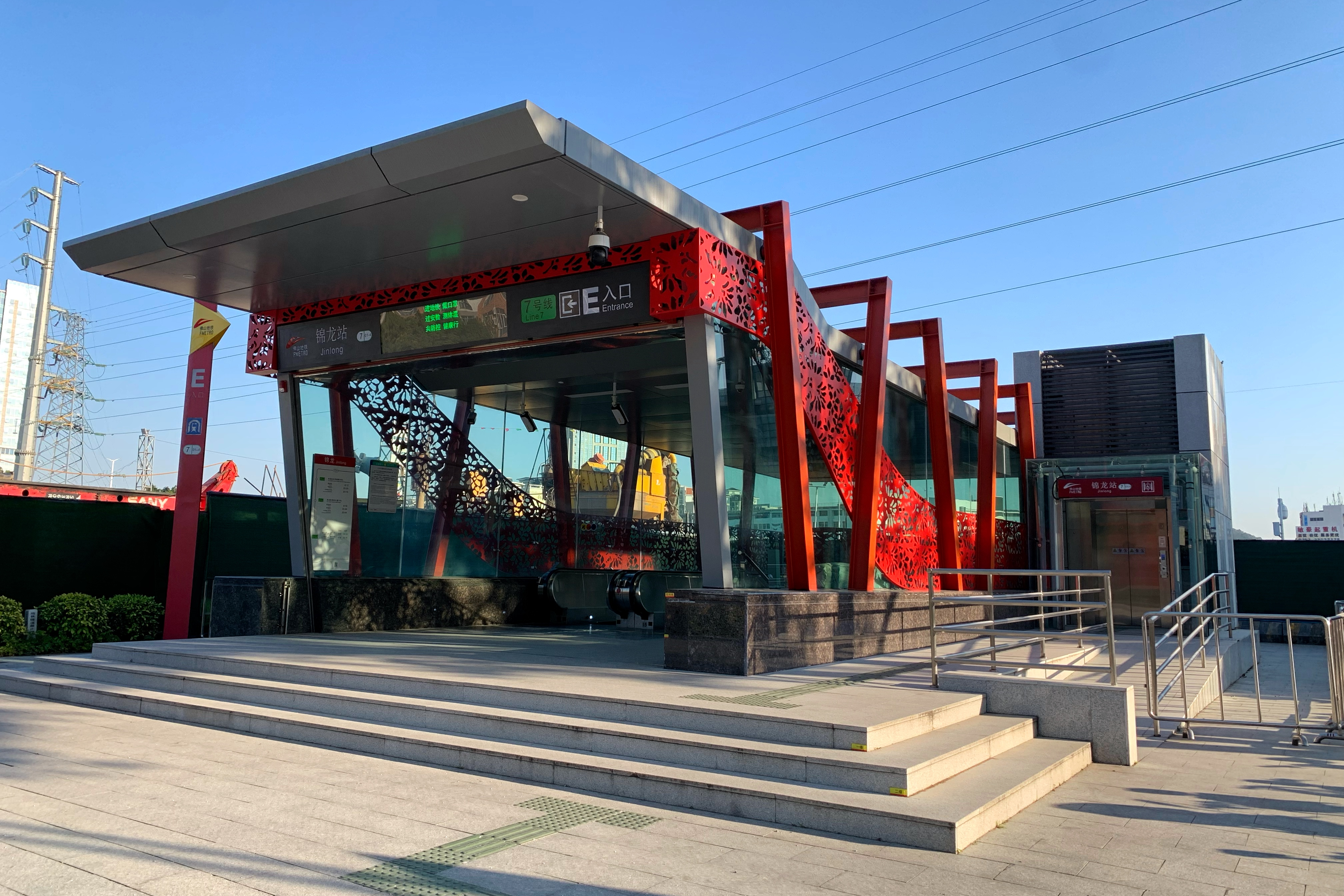
Entrance E

== History ==
The station was called Chencun New Town station during the planning and construction phase. The station started construction at the end of 2017 and topped out on 22 October 2020.

In 2021, this station was named Jinlong station. The station is located at the junction of the three communities of Jinlong, Hecheng and Nanchong in Chencun, and some citizens believe that compared with Chencun station one station to the north, in fact, the location of Jinlong Station is the center of Chencun Town, and it is suggested that Jinlong Station can be considered called Chencun Central station or Chencun Town station, which is clearer for passengers going to the center of Chencun Town.

The station opened on 1 May 2022 with the western extension of Line 7.

During COVID-19 pandemic control rules at the end of 2022, due to the impact of prevention and control measures, station service was suspended from 28 to the afternoon of 30 November 2022.
