= Dazhou station (Guangzhou Metro) =

Guangzhou Metro Line 7 station

Dazhou 大洲
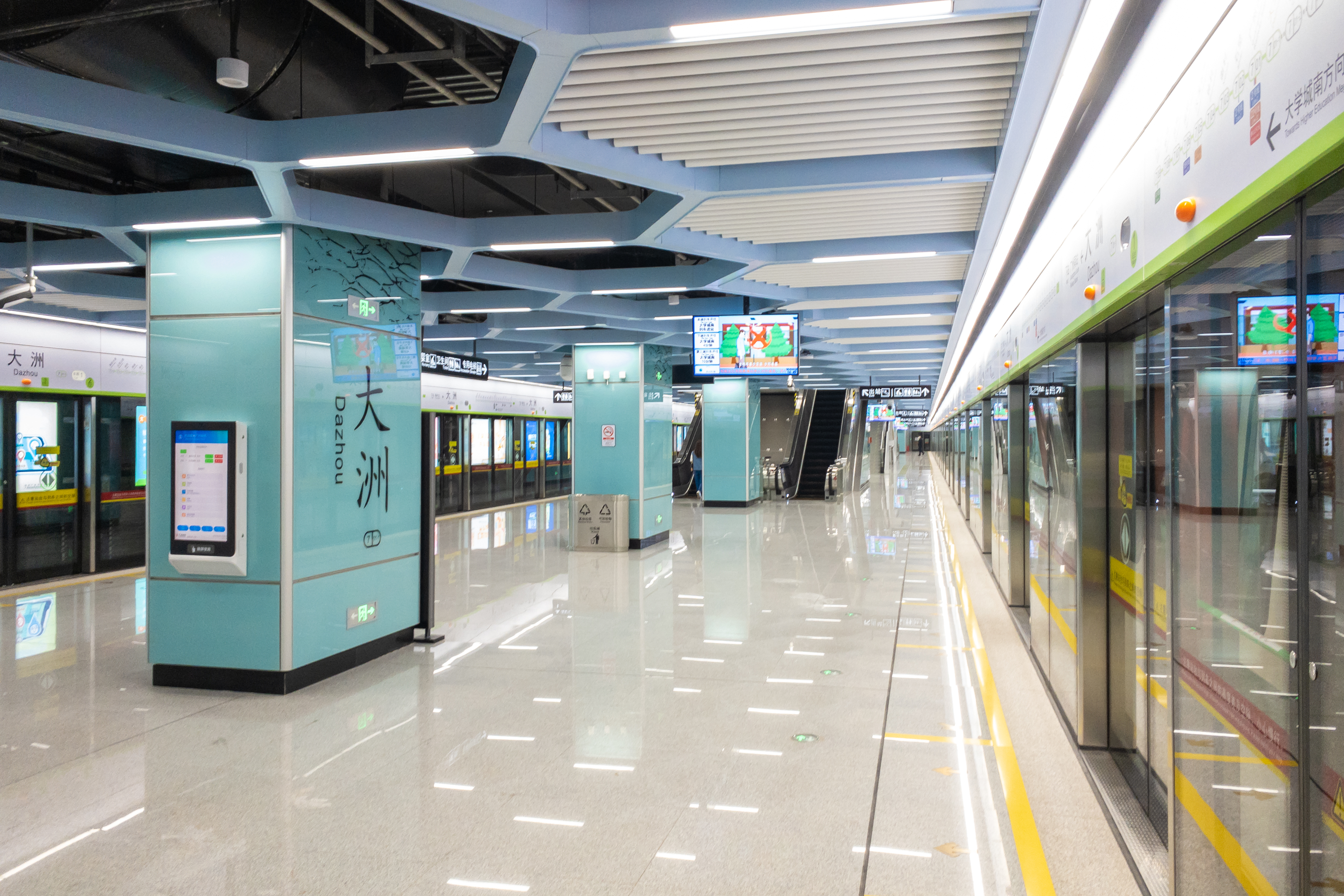
- Platform

Chinese name
- Chinese: 大洲站
Transcriptions
Standard Mandarin
- Hanyu Pinyin: Dàzhōu Zhàn
Yue: Cantonese
- Yale Romanization: Daaijāu Jaahm
- Jyutping: Daai^{6}zau^{1} Zaam^{6}

General information
- Location: Dazhou Road (大洲路) within Dazhou Village (大洲村), Shibi Subdistrict, Panyu District, Guangzhou, Guangdong; China
- Coordinates: 22°59′12.15″N 113°15′8.29″E
- Operator: Guangzhou Metro Group
- Line: Line 7
- Platforms: 2 (1 island platform)
- Tracks: 2

Construction
- Structure type: Underground
- Accessible: Yes

Other information
- Station code: 701-1

History
- Opened: 1 May 2022 (4 years ago)
- Former names: Weichong (韦涌)

Services
Preceding station	Guangzhou Metro	Following station
Chencunbei towards Meidi Dadao	Line 7	Guangzhou South Railway Station towards Yanshan
Location

Dazhou Station (Chinese: 大洲站; pinyin: Dàzhōu Zhàn; Cantonese Yale: Daaijāu Jaahm) is a station on Line 7 of Guangzhou Metro, located underground within Dazhou Village on Dazhou Road in Guangzhou's Panyu District. The station was opened on 1 May 2022, with the opening of the western extension of Line 7. This is the last station on the line westbound before it enters Foshan's Shunde District.

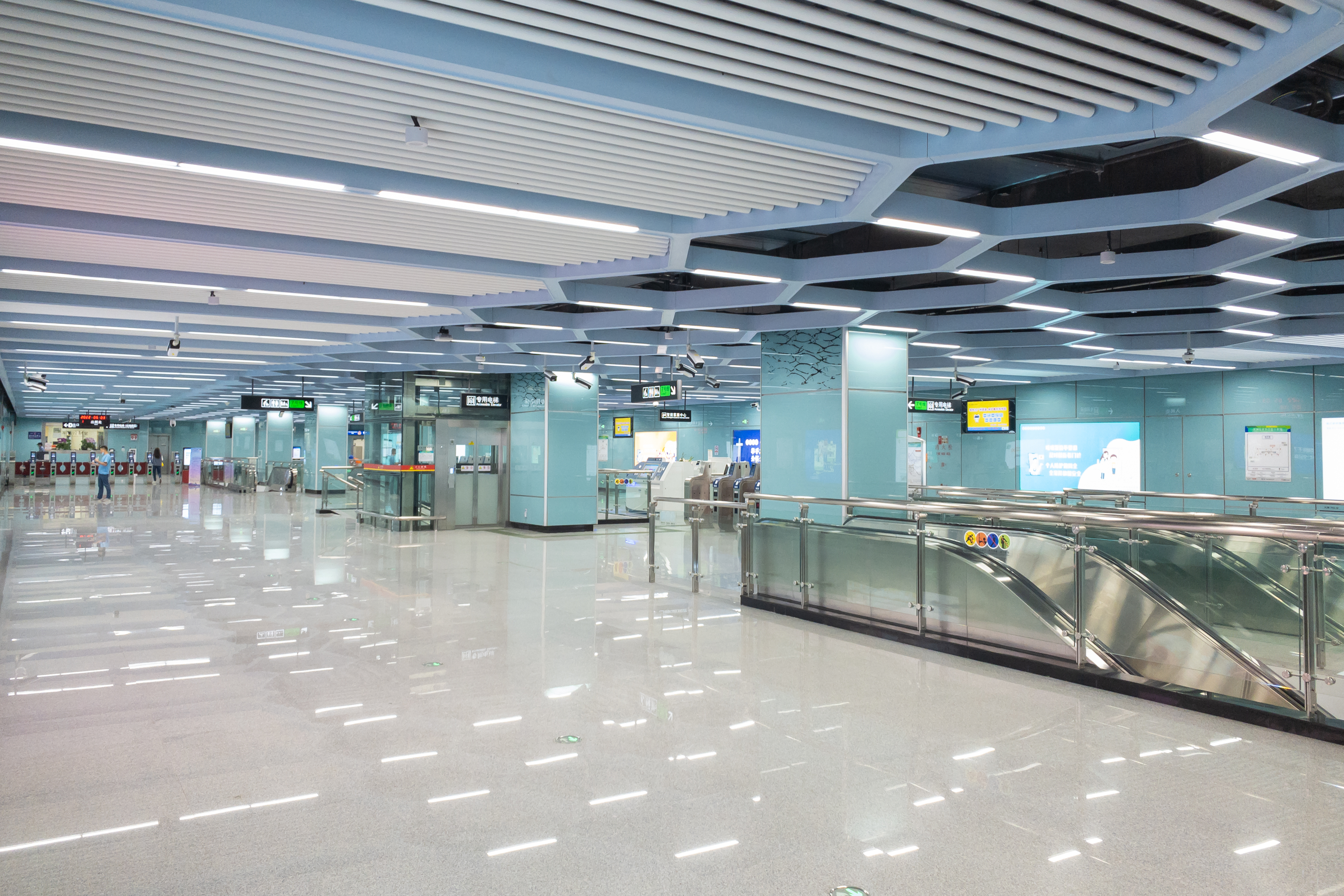
Concourse

== Station layout ==
G	Street level	Exits B, D
L1; Concourse	Lobby	Ticket Machines, Customer Service, Shops, Police Station, Security Facilities
L2; Platforms	Platform 2	7 towards Meidi Dadao (Chencunbei)
L2; Platforms	Island platform, doors will open on the left (Toilets, Nursery)
L2; Platforms	Platform 1	7 towards Yanshan (Guangzhou South Railway Station)

=== Entrances/exits ===
The station has 2 points of entry/exit. Exit D is equipped with an elevator.

- B: Dazhou Gongye Road
- D: Weida Road
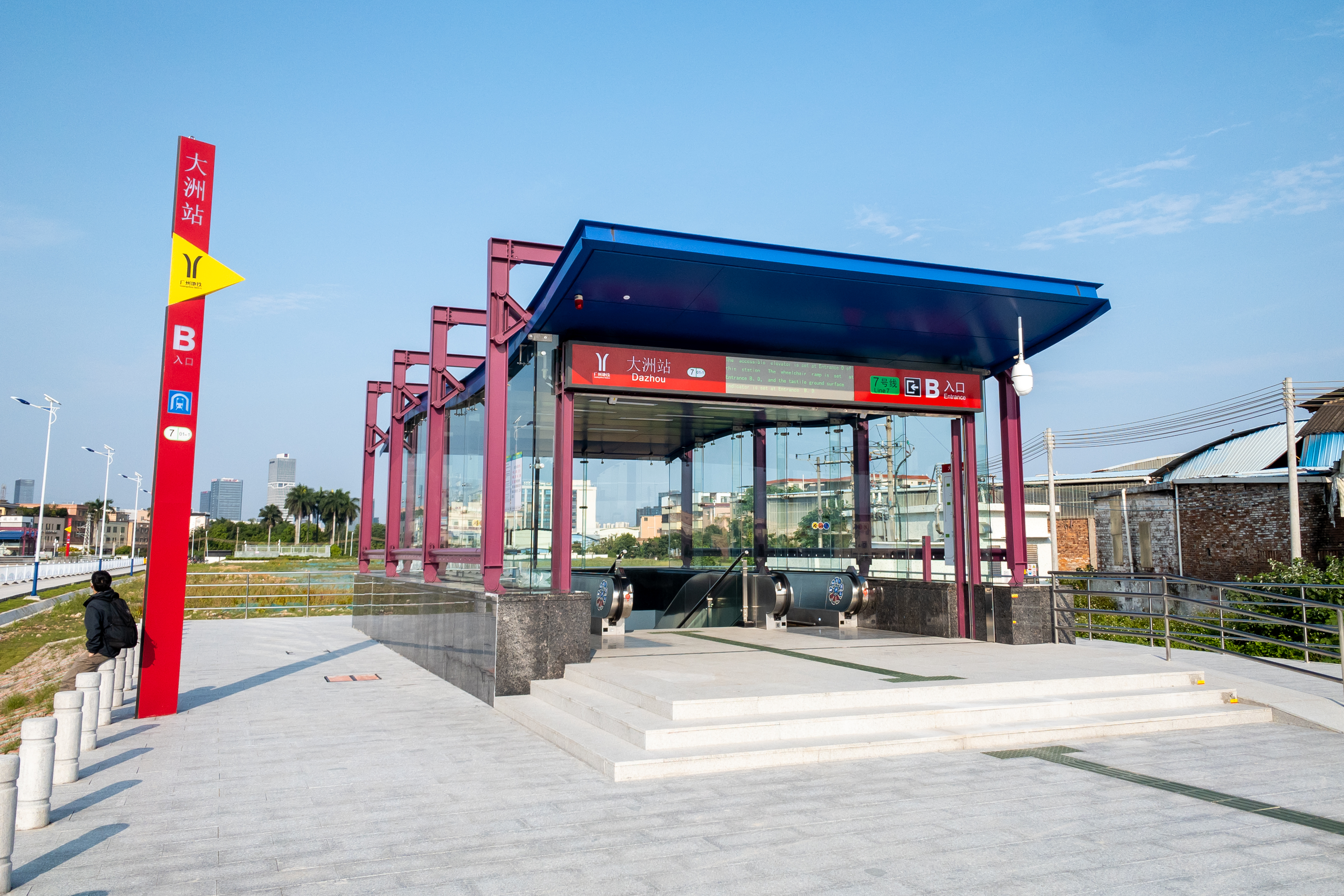
Entrance B

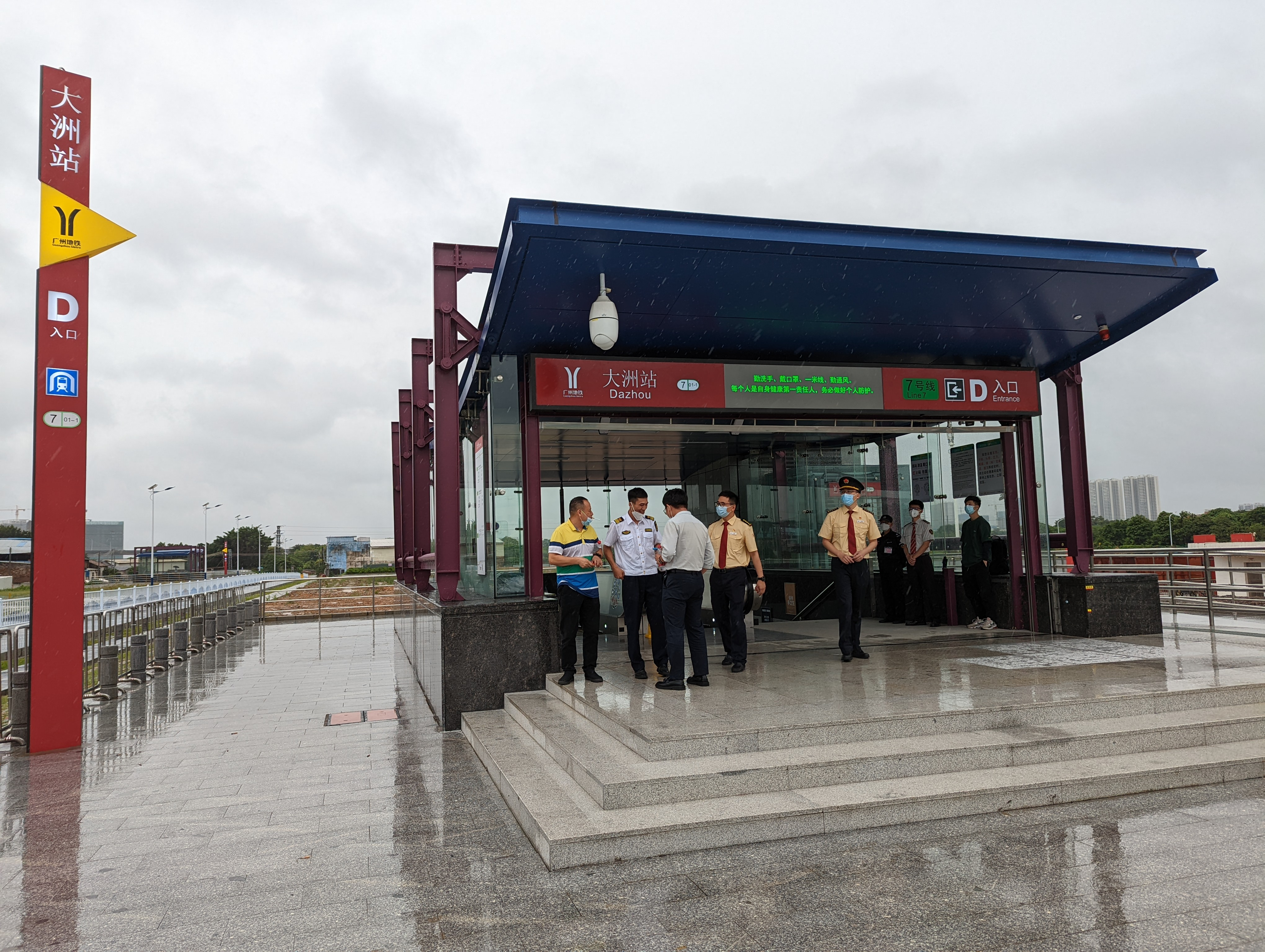
Entrance D

== History ==
The station was called Weichong station during the planning and construction phase. Since the station is actually located in Dazhou Village, not Weichong Village, the Guangzhou Metro Group renamed the station to Dazhou station and reported it to the Geographical Names Committee of the Guangzhou Civil Affairs Bureau in November 2020. The station completed the "three rights" transfer on 21 October 2021, making it the first station on the western extension of Line 7 to do so. It opened on 1 May 2022 with the western extension of Line 7.

During COVID-19 pandemic control rules at the end of 2022, due to the impact of prevention and control measures, station service was suspended from 28 to the afternoon of 30 November 2022.
