= Chencun, Guangdong =

Town in Foshan, China

Coordinates: 22.962582°N 113.233852°E

Chencun
- Traditional Chinese: 陳村
- Simplified Chinese: 陈村
- Postal: Chanchuen
Transcriptions
Standard Mandarin
- Wade–Giles: Ch'en^{2}-ts'un^{1}

Chencun (陈村) is a town in the Shunde district of Foshan (a prefecture-level city) in China's Guangdong Province. It is popular with its flower planting and has become a production base of fresh flowers.

== See also ==
- Ou Daren
- Ou Shizi
