= Changzhou station (Guangzhou Metro) =

Guangzhou Metro Line 7 and Line 8 station

Changzhou 长洲
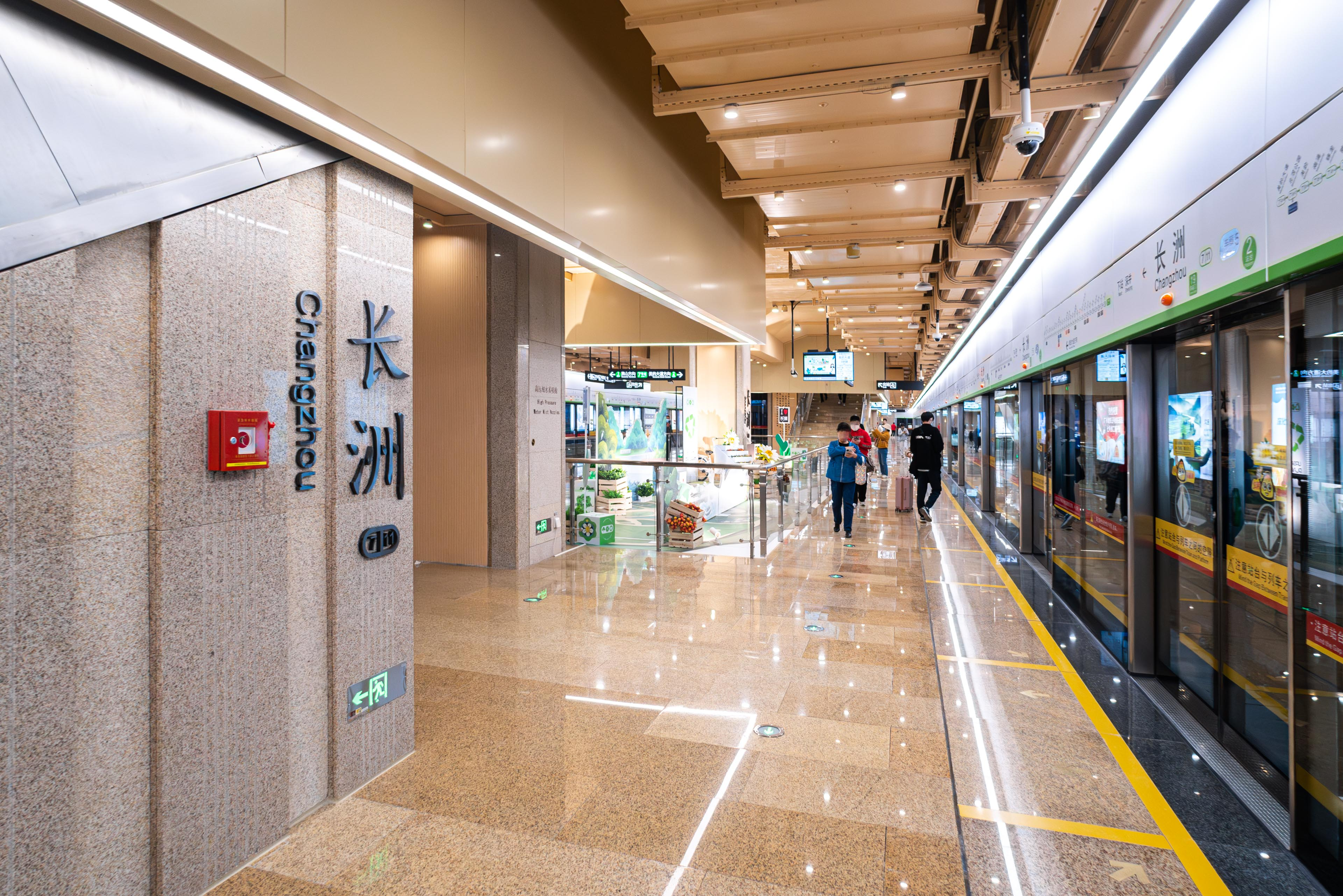
- Platform with decorative art installations

Chinese name
- Simplified Chinese: 长洲站
- Traditional Chinese: 長洲站
Transcriptions
Standard Mandarin
- Hanyu Pinyin: Chángzhōu Zhàn
Yue: Cantonese
- Yale Romanization: Chèuhng Jāu Jaahm
- Jyutping: Coeng^{4}zau^{1} Zaam^{6}

General information
- Location: Intersection of Jinzhou North Road (金洲北路) and Jindie Road (金蝶路), Changzhou Island, Changzhou Subdistrict; Huangpu District, Guangzhou, Guangdong; China
- Coordinates: 23°4′42.71″N 113°25′25.75″E
- Operator: Guangzhou Metro Co. Ltd.
- Line: Line 7
- Platforms: 2 (1 island platform)
- Tracks: 2

Construction
- Structure type: Underground
- Accessible: Yes

Other information
- Station code: 711

History
- Opened: 28 December 2023 (2 years ago)

Services
Preceding station	Guangzhou Metro	Following station
Shenjing towards Meidi Dadao	Line 7	Yufengwei towards Yanshan
Future services
Shenjing towards Meidi Dadao	Line 7	Hongshengsha towards Yanshan
Location

Changzhou Station (simplified Chinese: 长洲站; traditional Chinese: 長洲站; pinyin: Chángzhōu Zhàn; Cantonese Yale: Chèuhng Jāu Jaahm) is a station of Guangzhou Metro Line 7, located underground at the intersection Jinzhou North Road with Jindie Road on Changzhou Island in Guangzhou's Huangpu District. It opened on 28 December 2023, with the opening of Phase 2 of Line 7.

The station has a reserved interchange interface and platform with Line 8, which is planned to have a stop here.

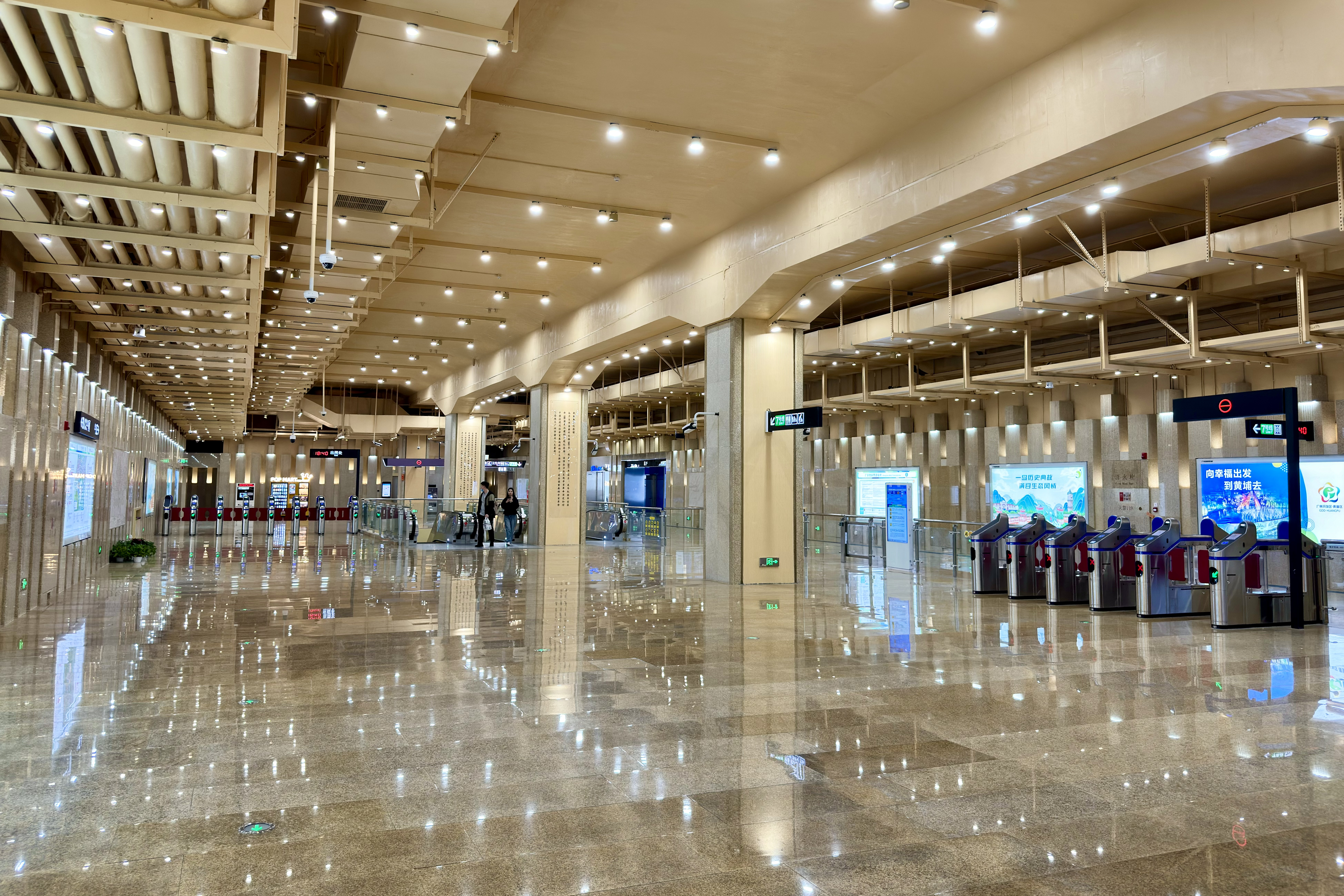
Concourse

== Art installation ==
This station is one of the two cultural theme stations of the second phase of Line 7, the station is designed with the theme "Huangpu Spirit", and the whole station is made of golden stone to show the cultural heritage of Changzhou Island.

== Station layout ==
G	Street level	Exits B, C, E
L1; Concourse	Lobby	Ticket Machines, Customer Service, Shops, Police Station, Security Facilities
L2; Platforms	Platform 2	7 towards Meidi Dadao (Shenjing)
L2; Platforms	Island platform, doors will open on the left (Toilets, Nursery)
L2; Platforms	Platform 1	7 towards Yanshan (Yufengwei)
L3; Reserved Platforms		8 reserved track area
L3; Reserved Platforms	Reserved Island platform
L3; Reserved Platforms		8 reserved track area

=== Entrances/exits ===
The station has 3 points of entry/exit. Exit B is equipped with an elevator.

- B: Jinzhou North Road
- C: Jinzhou North Road, Former site of the Huangpu Military Academy
- E: Jinzhou North Road, Memorial Museum of 1911 Revolution
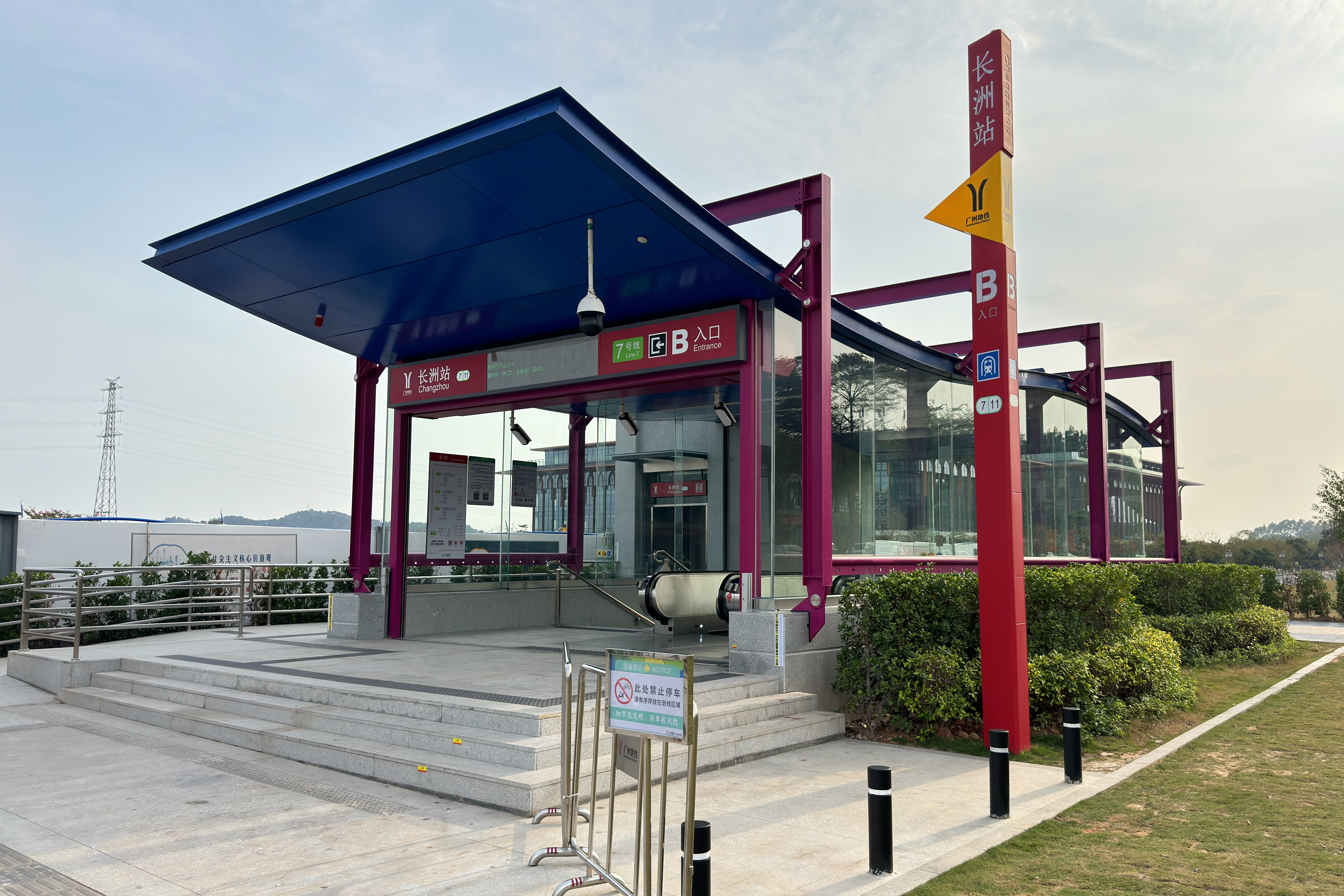
Entrance B

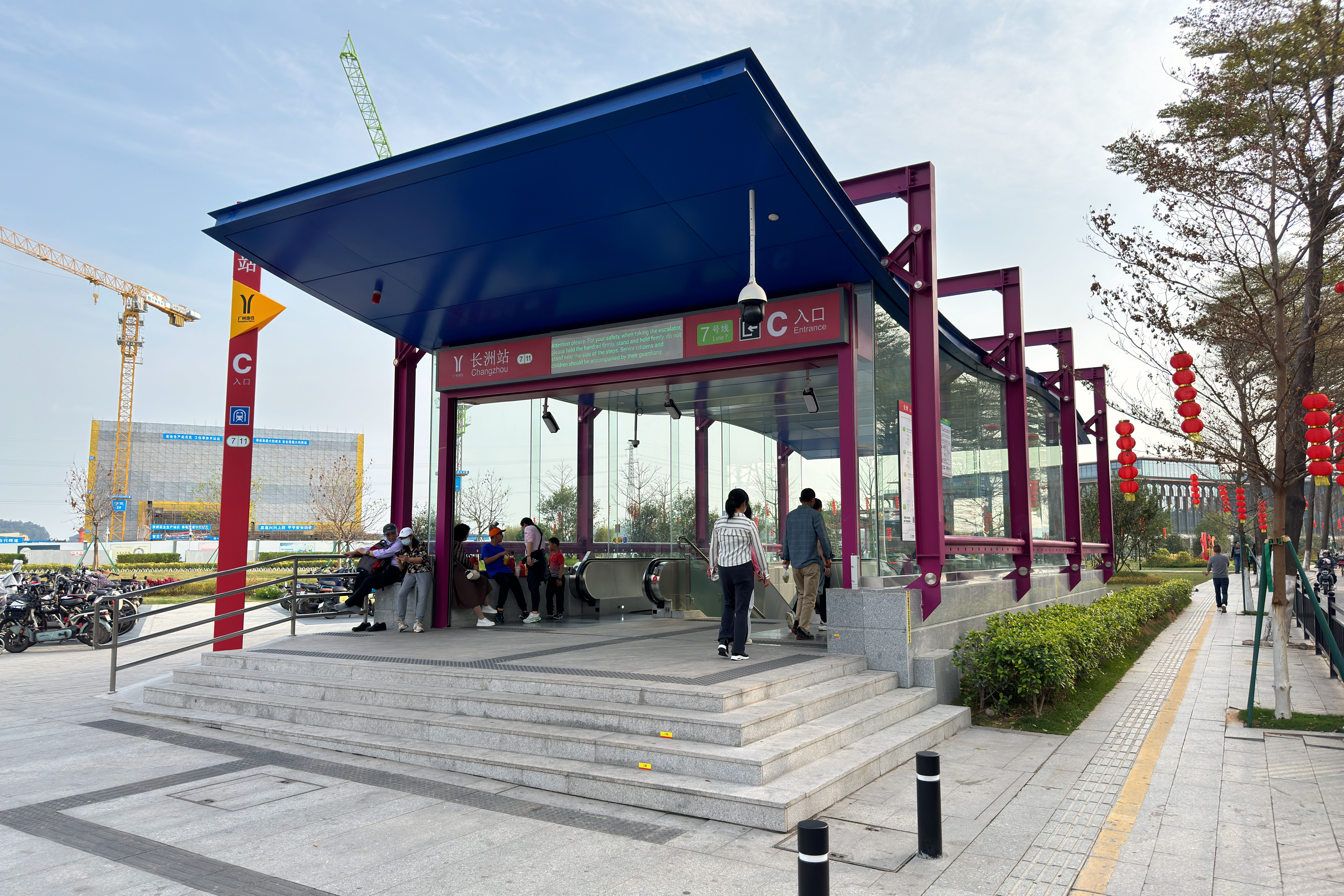
Entrance C

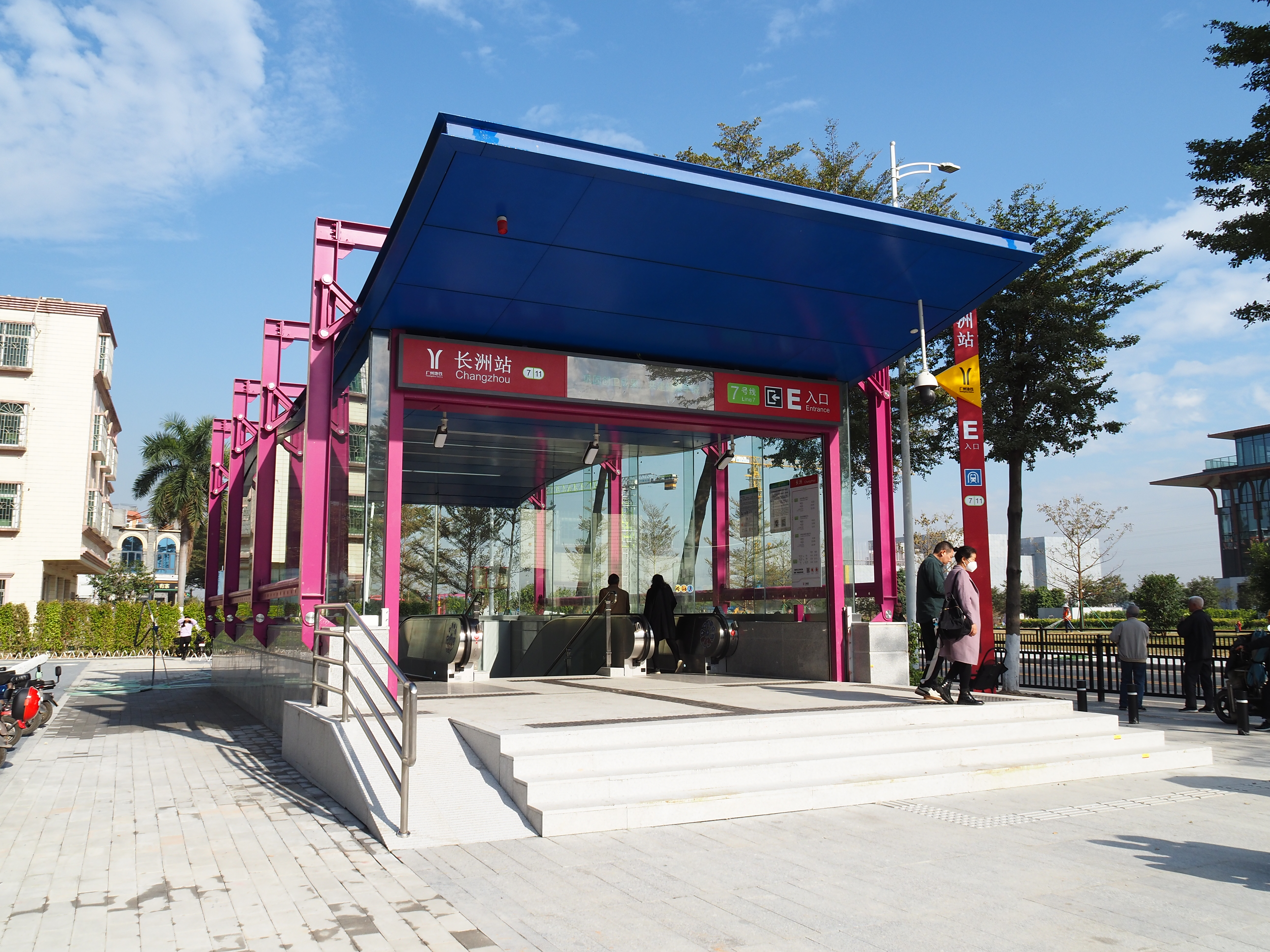
Entrance E

== History ==
On 31 August 2020, the main structure of the first phase of this site was topped out. The station completed the "three powers" transfer in October 2023. At 12:00 on December 28, the station was put into use with the opening of Line 7 Phase 2.

== Future development ==
Line 8 is planned to have a stop here, which will interchange with Line 7. After the completion and opening of the Line 8 station, the station transfer node, the concourse and platform of Line 8 will be opened, and passengers can transfer to the two lines at the station. The Line 8 station will have three floors, located underneath the planned Jindie Road South, underneath the Line 7 platform by forming a "T" shape rotating 25 degrees counterclockwise. The Line 8 station will be equipped with 14-metre island platforms, with existing transfer nodes reserved in the middle of the Line 7 platform and additional escalators connecting to the transfer platform then to the Line 8 platform on the third basement level in the future.

Line 8 station enclosure construction began in late 2024.
