= Yuzhu station =

Guangzhou Metro Line 5 and Line 13 station

Yuzhu 鱼珠
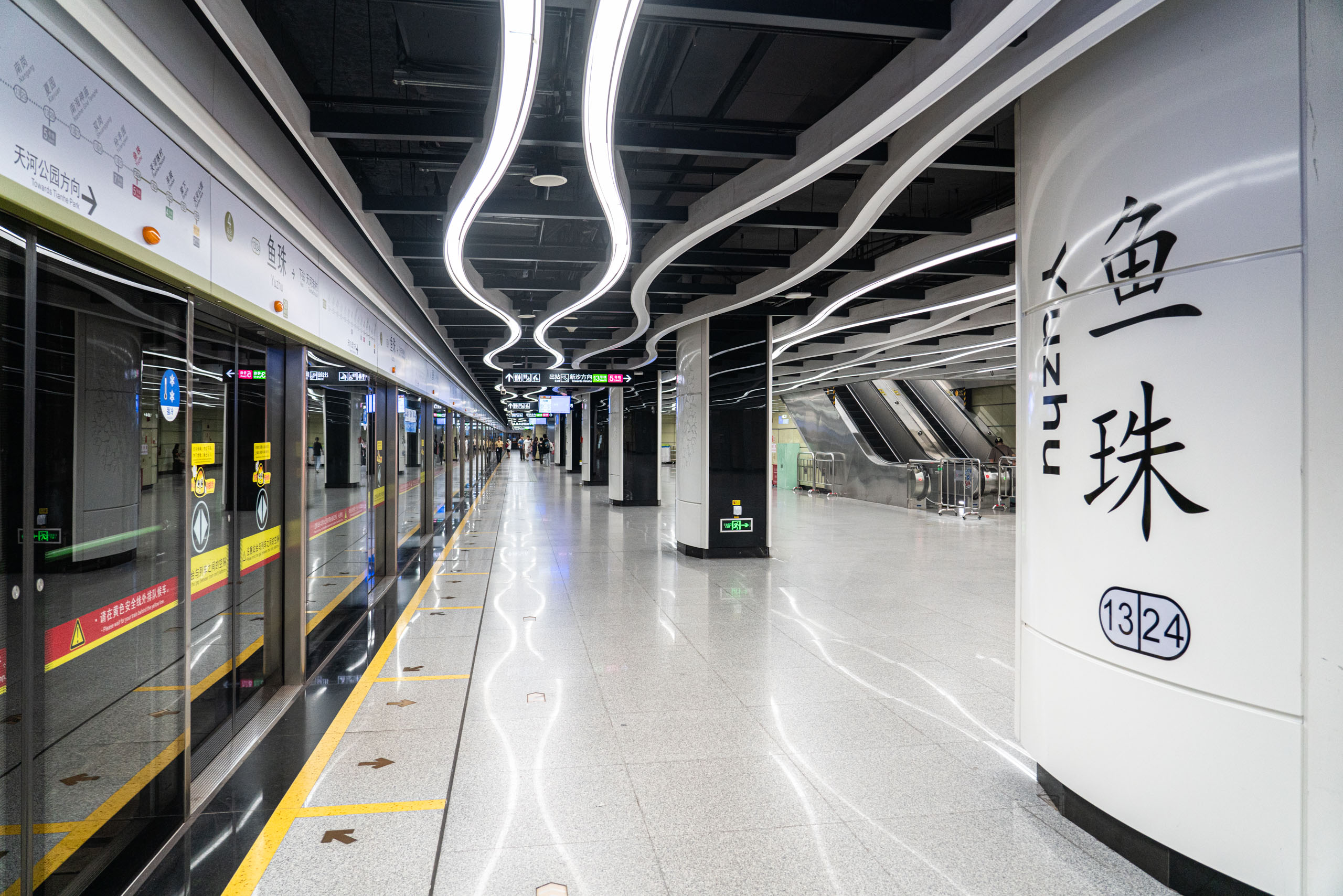
- Line 13 platform 4 (towards Tianhe Park)

Chinese name
- Simplified Chinese: 鱼珠站
- Traditional Chinese: 魚珠站
Transcriptions
Standard Mandarin
- Hanyu Pinyin: Yúzhū Zhàn
Yue: Cantonese
- Jyutping: jyu^{4}zyu^{1} zaam^{6}

General information
- Location: Yumao Road (鱼茅路); Huangpu District, Guangzhou, Guangdong; China
- Coordinates: 23.1004°N 113.4322°E
- Operator: Guangzhou Metro Co. Ltd.
- Lines: Line 5; Line 13
- Platforms: 4 (1 island platform and 2 side platforms)
- Tracks: 4

Construction
- Structure type: Underground
- Accessible: Yes

Other information
- Station code: 521 1324

History
- Opened: Line 5: 28 December 2009 (16 years ago); Line 13: 28 December 2017 (8 years ago)

Services
Preceding station	Guangzhou Metro	Following station
Sanxi towards Jiaokou	Line 5	Dashadi towards Huangpu New Port
Tianhe Zhucun towards Tianhe Park	Line 13	Yufengwei towards Xinsha
Route map
Location
- Map

Yuzhu Station (Chinese: 鱼珠站), formerly Maogang Station (茅岗站) during planning, is an interchange station between Line 5 and Line 13 of the Guangzhou Metro. It is located under Yumao Road (鱼茅路) near the south of the Maogang Interchange (茅岗立交) on Huangpu Avenue (黄埔大道) in the Huangpu District. It opened on 28 December 2009. It was the western terminus of Line 13 until the phase 2 initial extension to Tianhe Park opened on 29 September 2025. As part of the extension, a yard for the line at Yuzhu was constructed adjacent Yuzhu Yard for Line 5 in June 2025.

== Station layout ==
G	-	Exits A-D
L1; Concourse	Lobby	Ticket Machines, Customer Service, Shops, Police Station, Safety Facilities
L2; Platforms	Side platform, doors will open on the right
L2; Platforms	Platform 4	13 towards Tianhe Park (Tianhe Zhucun)
L2; Platforms	Platform 3	13 towards Xinsha (Yufengwei)
L2; Platforms	Side platform, doors will open on the right
L3; Platforms	Platform 2	5 towards Jiaokou (Sanxi)
L3; Platforms	Island Platform, doors will open on the left
L3; Platforms	Platform 1	5 towards Huangpu New Port (Dashadi)

=== Entrances/exits ===
Yuzhu has 4 points of entry/exit. Exit B is equipped with an elevator, and Exit C is equipped with a stairlift.

- A: Yumao Road
- B: Yumao Road
- C: Yumao Road
- D: Yumao Road
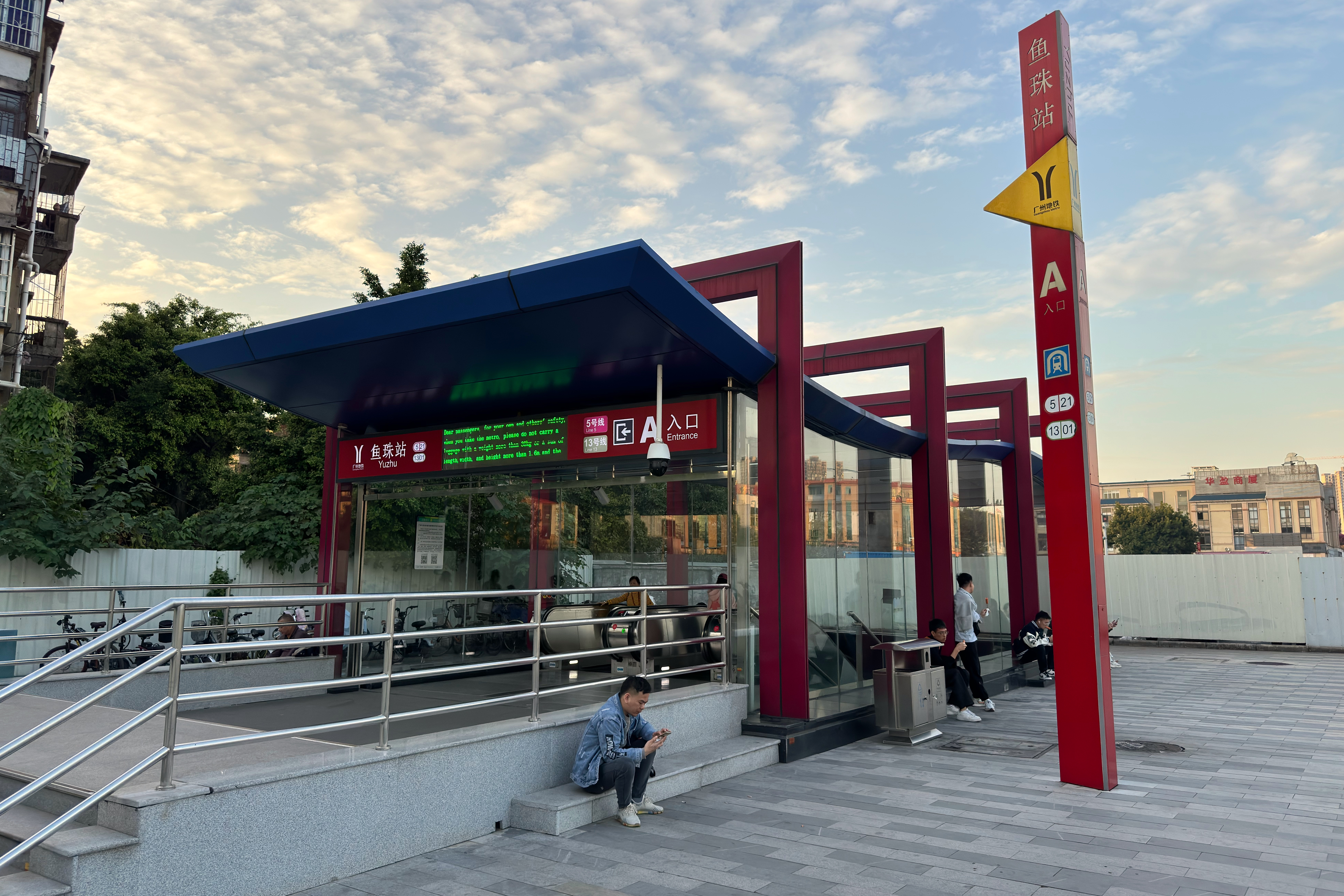
Entrance A

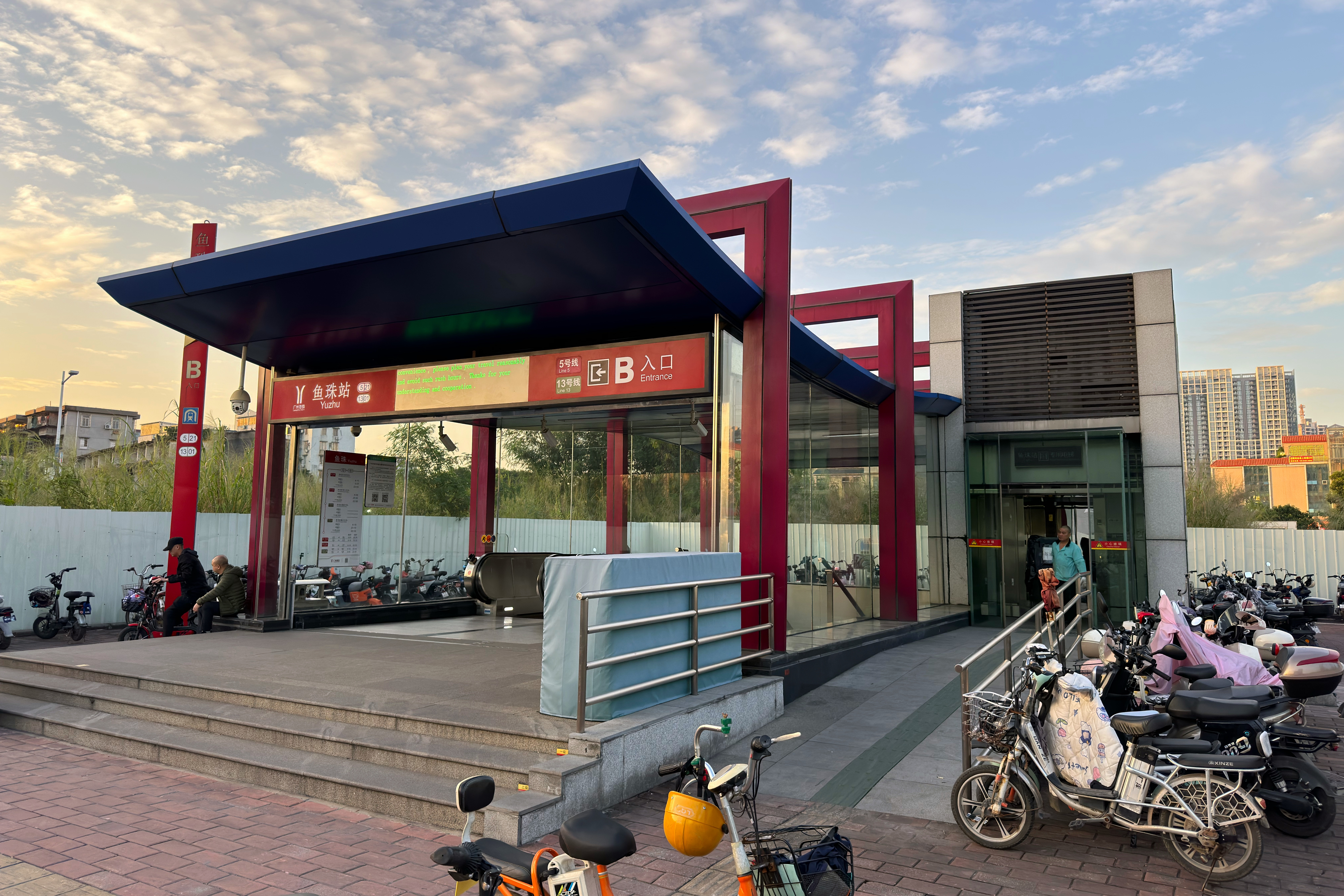
Entrance B

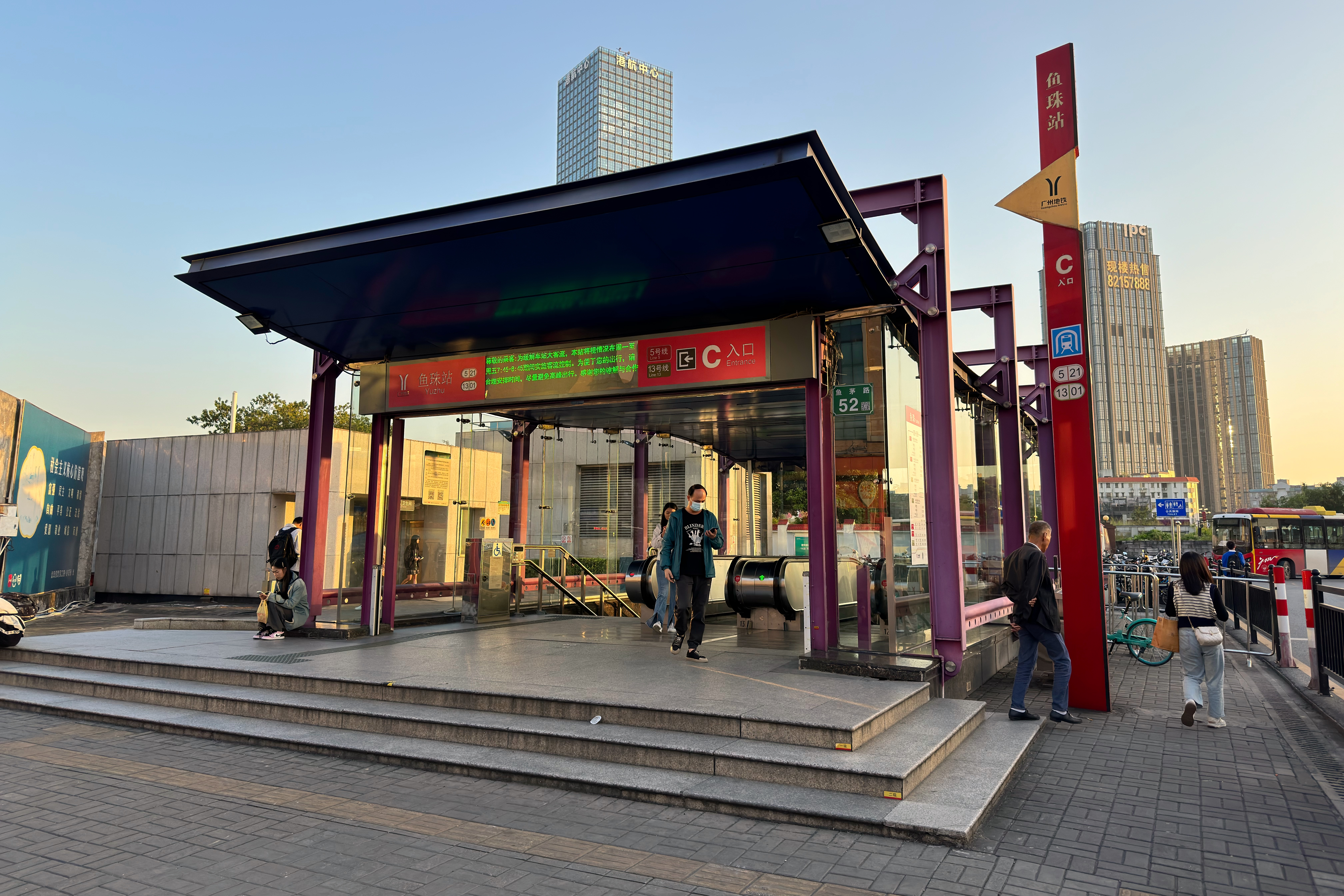
Entrance C

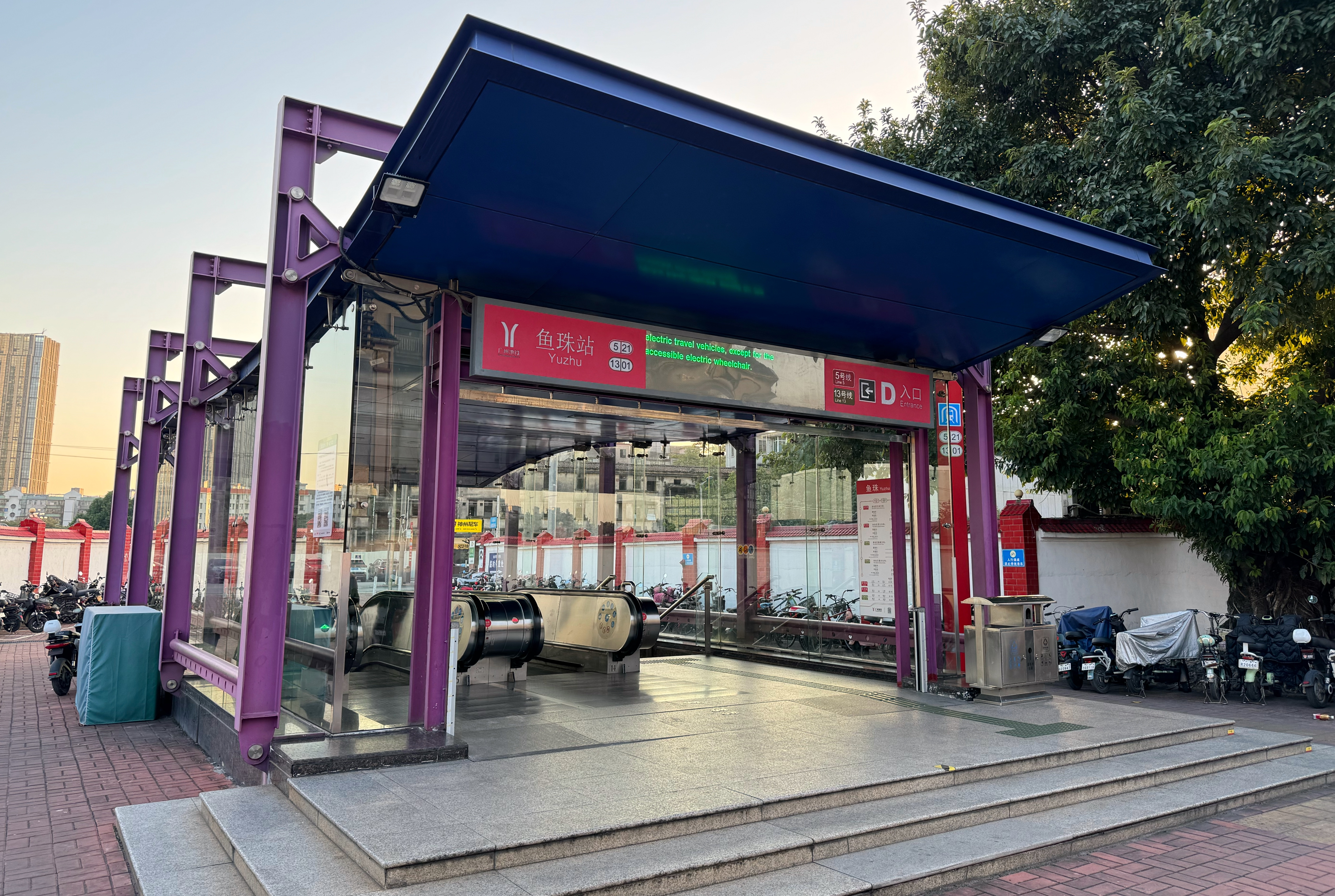
Entrance D

== Gallery ==
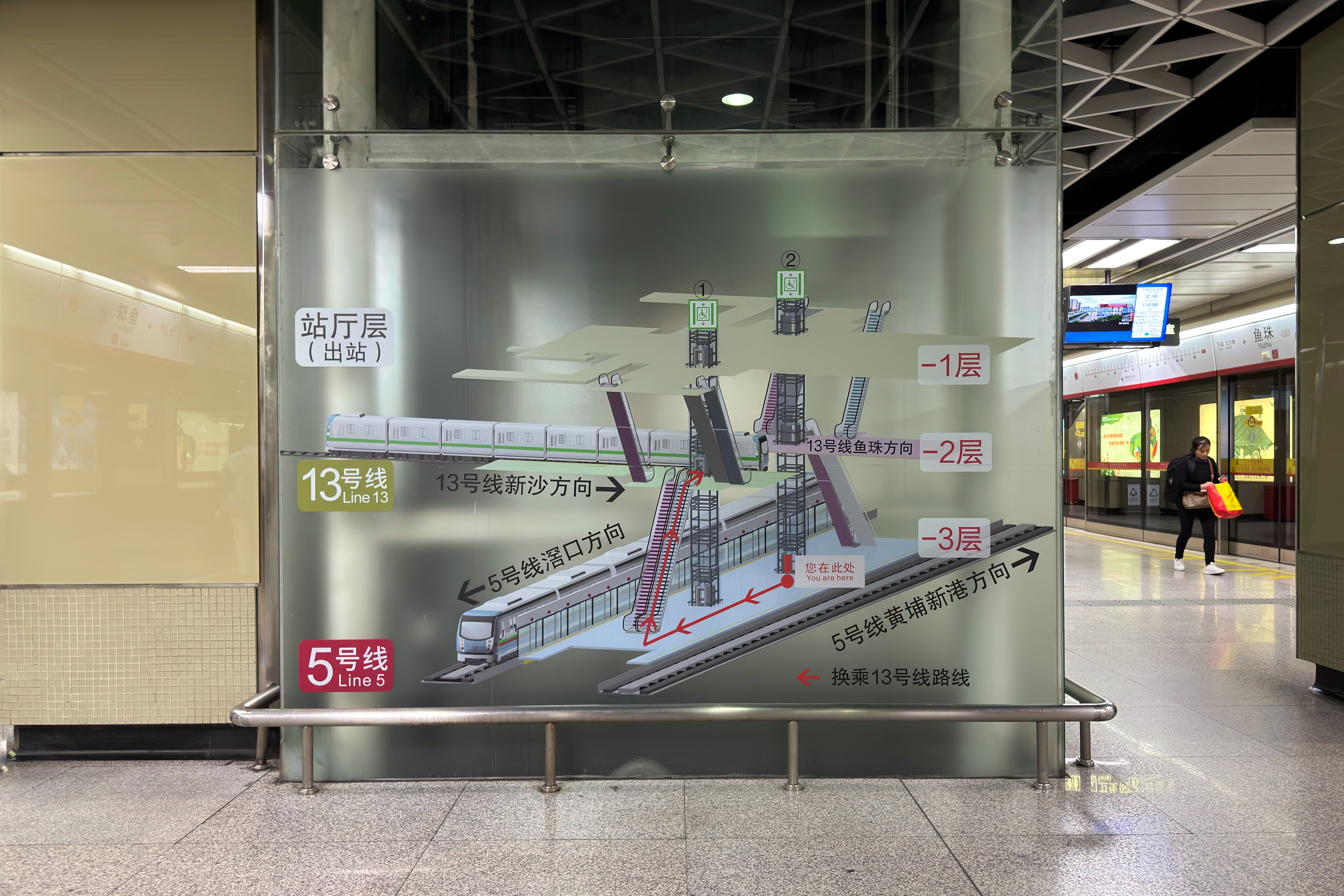
Schematic diagram of station structure

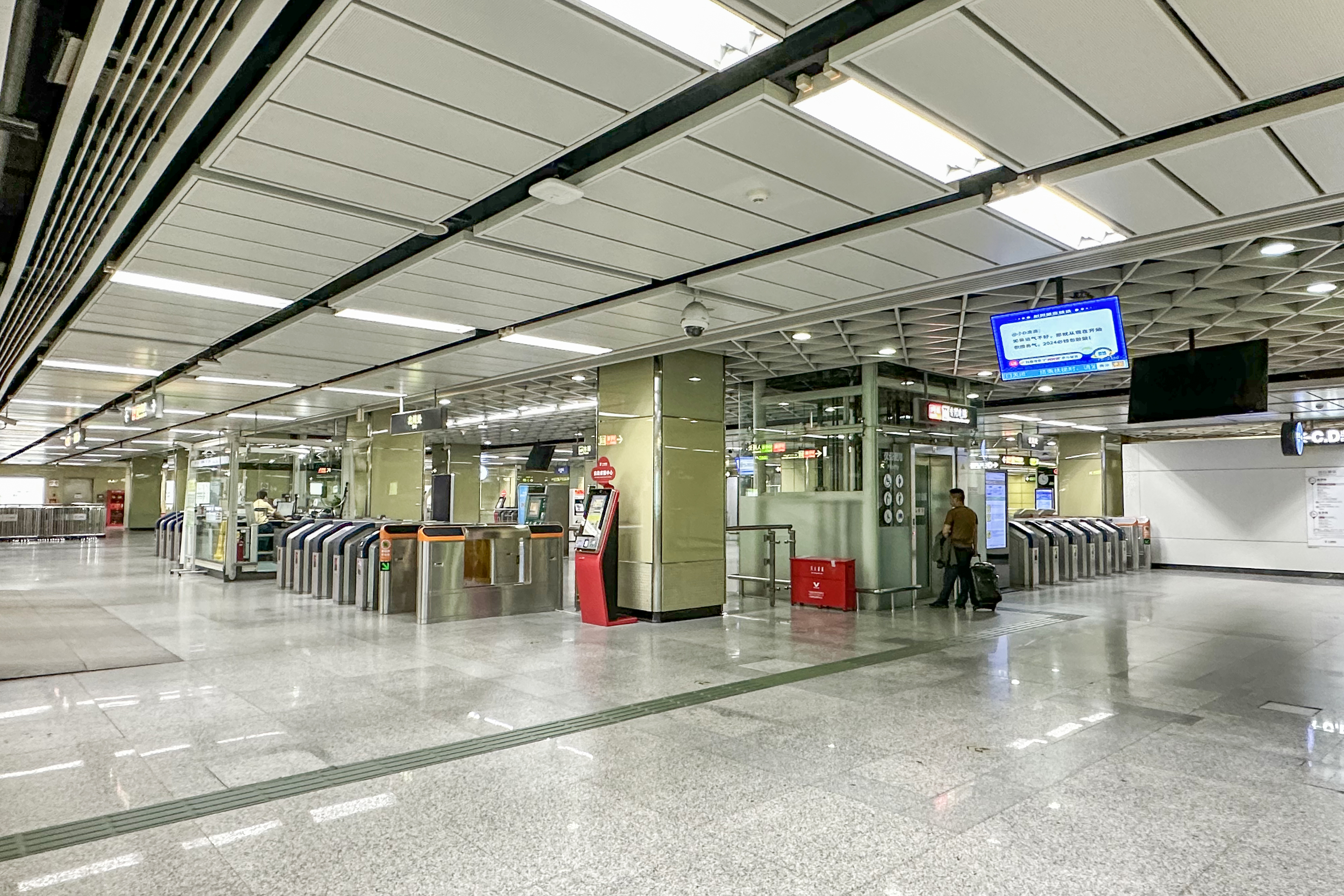
Line 5 concourse

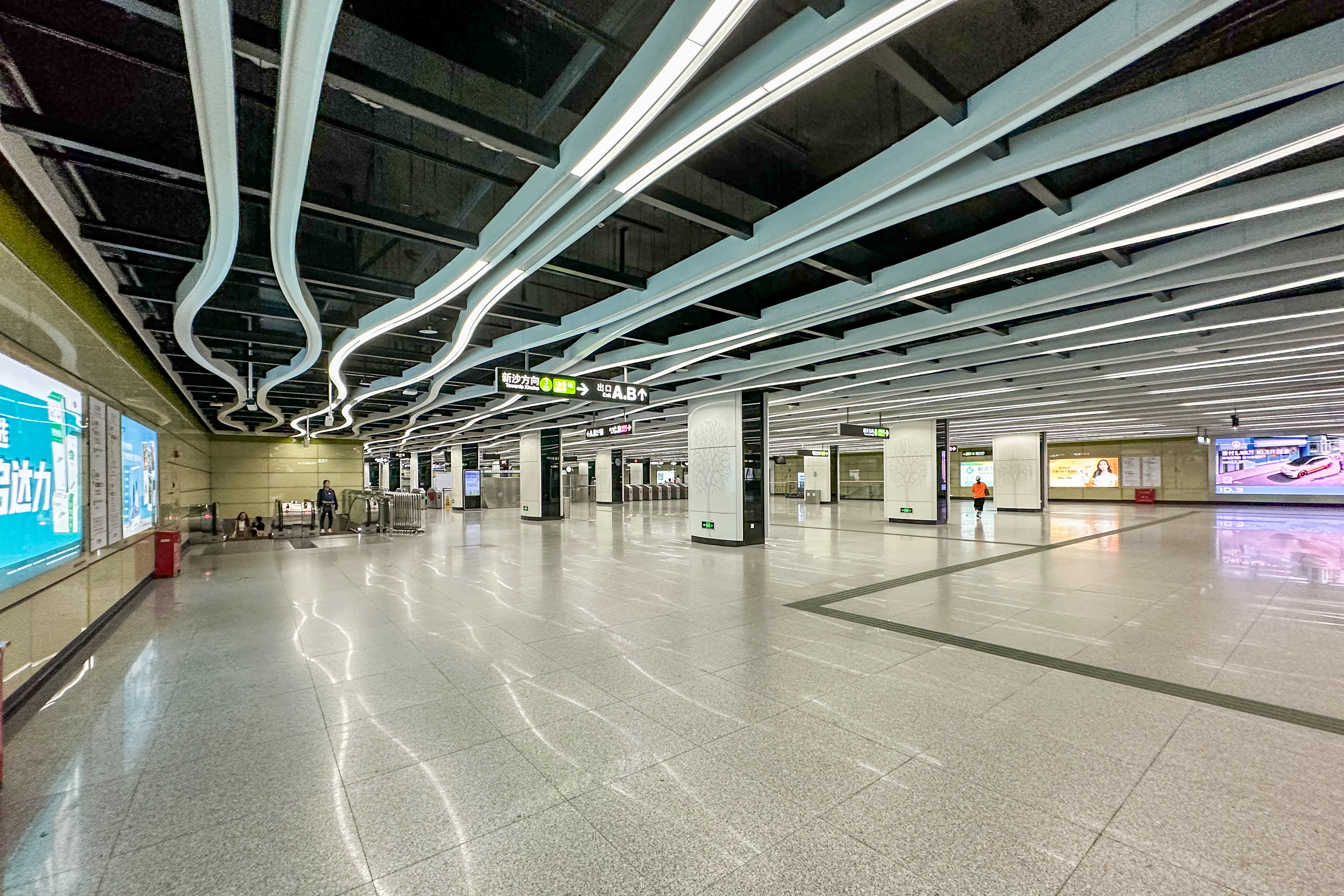
Line 13 concourse (south side)

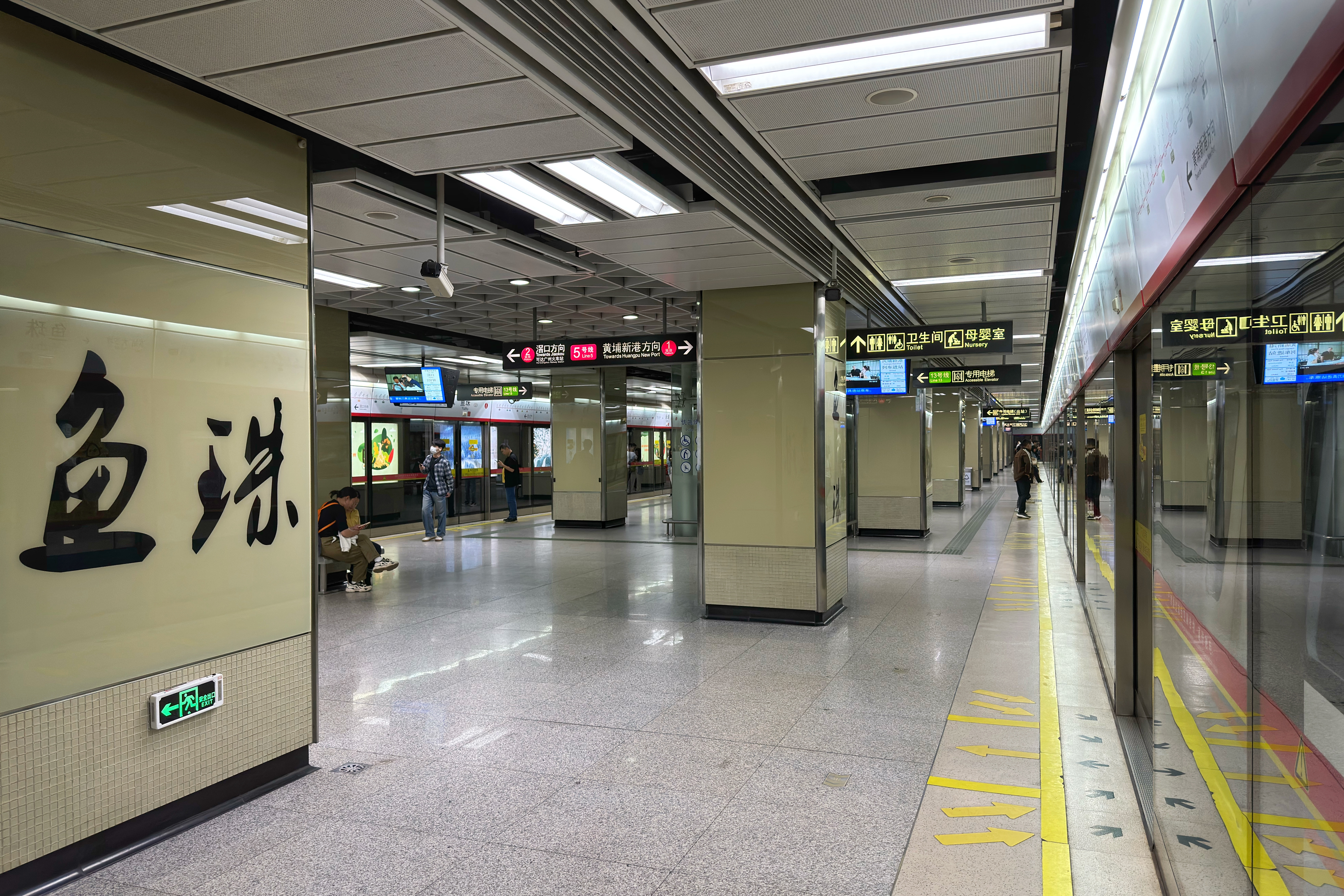
Line 5 platform

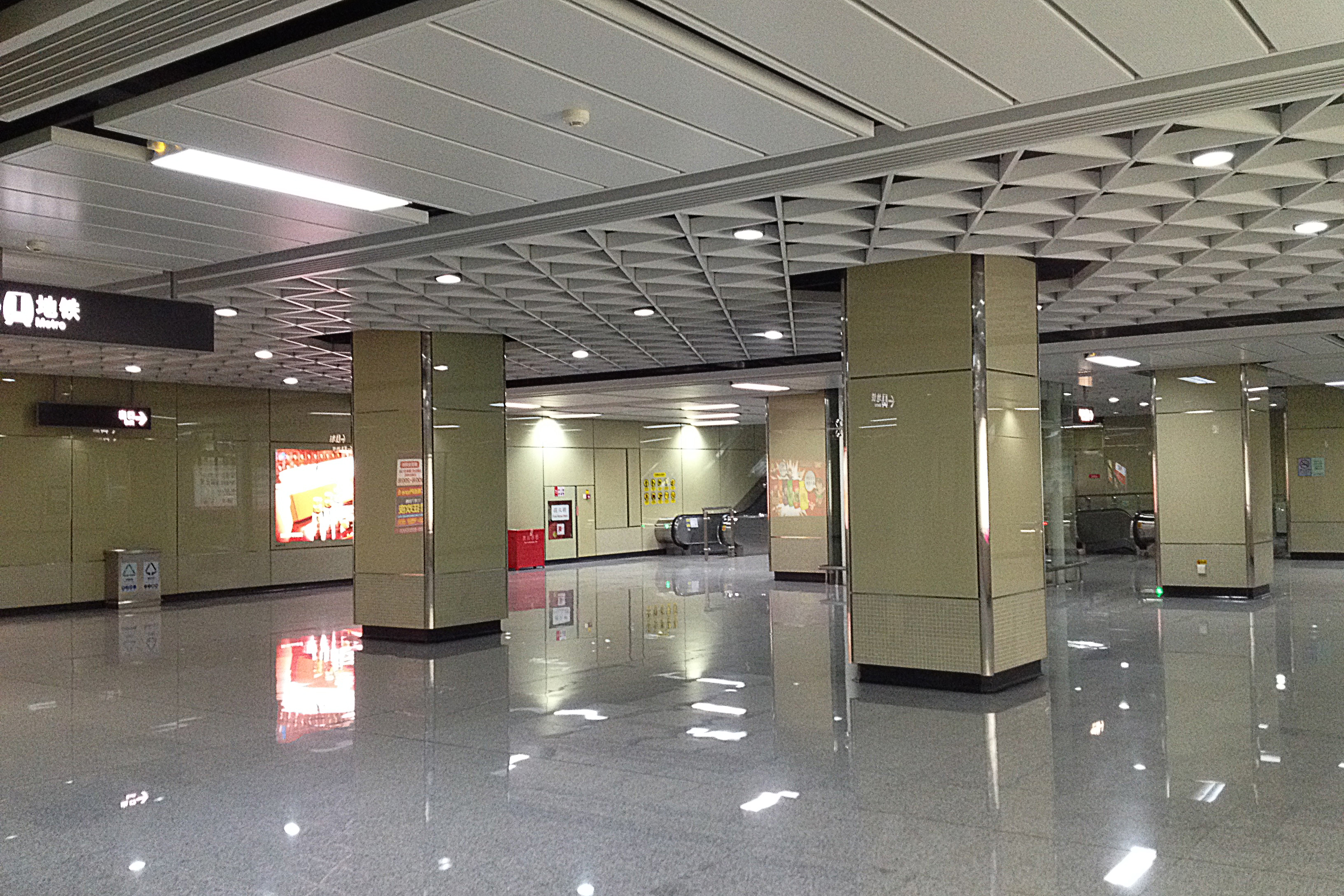
Mezzanine before the construction of Line 13

== History ==
The Line 5 station opened on 28 December 2009. The station was initially built with provisions for the future construction and integration of Line 13; however this was while Line 13 was still projected to use the smaller Type L light metro cars as Line 5 used. Due to overcrowding on routes using the smaller Type L cars, Line 13 was instead upgraded to use high capacity 8-car Type A cars. During phase I construction, Line 13 platforms were extended south to accommodate the longer trains with the platform heights adjusted accordingly. Line 13 began servicing the station with the rest of Phase I on 28 December 2017.

== Future ==
=== Line 28 ===
The planned high-speed metro Line 28 is projected to serve Yuzhu station, however the line is still in planning and no construction timeline has been announced yet.
