= Hongshengsha station =

Future Guangzhou Metro Line 7 station

Hongshengsha 洪圣沙
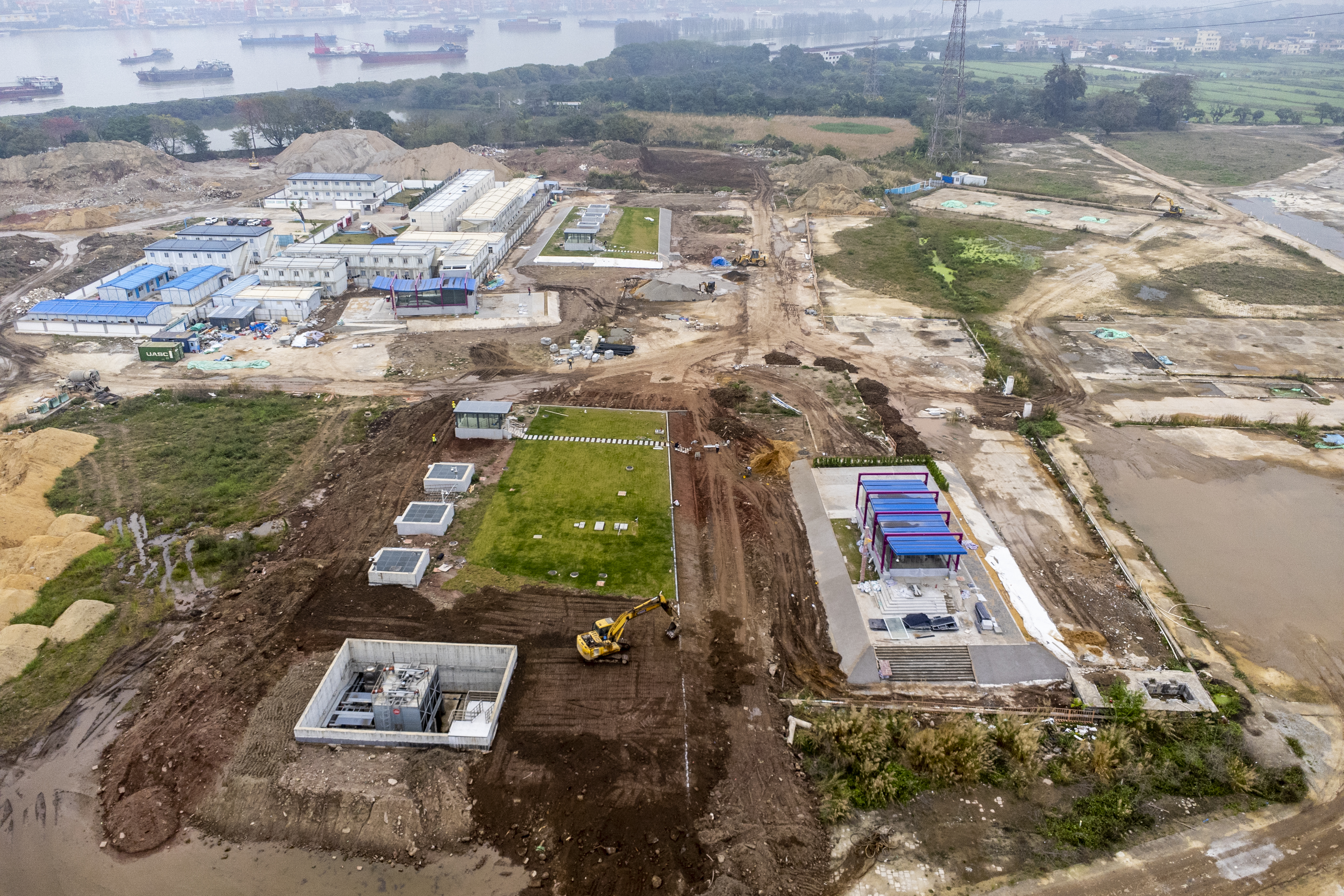
- Aerial view of the station surface and surrounding construction site (March 2024)

Chinese name
- Simplified Chinese: 洪圣沙站
- Traditional Chinese: 洪聖沙站
Transcriptions
Standard Mandarin
- Hanyu Pinyin: Hóngshèngshā Zhàn
Yue: Cantonese
- Yale Romanization: Hùhngsingsā Jaahm
- Jyutping: Hung^{4}sing^{3}saa^{1} Zaam^{6}

General information
- Location: West side of Hongshengsha Island, Huangpu District, Guangzhou, Guangdong; China
- Coordinates: 23°5′6.32″N 113°26′17.09″E
- Operated by: Guangzhou Metro Co. Ltd.
- Line: Line 7
- Platforms: 2 (1 island platform)
- Tracks: 2

Construction
- Structure type: Underground
- Accessible: Yes

Other information
- Station code: 712

History
- Opening: To be determined

Services
Preceding station	Guangzhou Metro	Following station
Line 7 does not stop here
Future services
Changzhou towards Meidi Dadao	Line 7	Yufengwei towards Yanshan
Location

Hongshengsha Station (simplified Chinese: 洪圣沙站; traditional Chinese: 洪聖沙站; pinyin: Hóngshèngshā Zhàn; Cantonese Yale: Hùhngsingsā Jaahm) is a station of Guangzhou Metro Line 7, located underground on the west side of Hongshengsha Island in Guangzhou's Huangpu District. The civil works and mechanical and electrical works of the station have been basically completed, but because Hongshengsha Island, where the station is located, has not been developed, and the construction of various municipal supporting facilities has not been completed, the station does not have the opening conditions, so the station cannot be opened simultaneously with the second phase of Line 7, and trains currently pass the station without stopping. It will not open until the island is more developed.

== Station layout ==
Since both ends of the station are on the Pearl River, and in order to meet the requirements of the depth of the rail crossing the river, the station has a total of 3 floors. The station is planned to have 4 exits.

G	Street level	Exits A-D
L1; Concourse	Lobby	Ticket Machines, Customer Service, Shops, Police Station, Security Facilities
L2; Mezzanine	Buffer Level	Station Equipment
L3; Platforms	Platform 2	7 towards Meidi Dadao (Changzhou)
L3; Platforms	Island platform, doors will not open (Toilets, Nursery)
L3; Platforms	Platform 1	7 towards Yanshan (Yufengwei)

=== Entrances/exits ===
The station will have 4 points of entry/exit, currently only Exits A and C have been constructed.

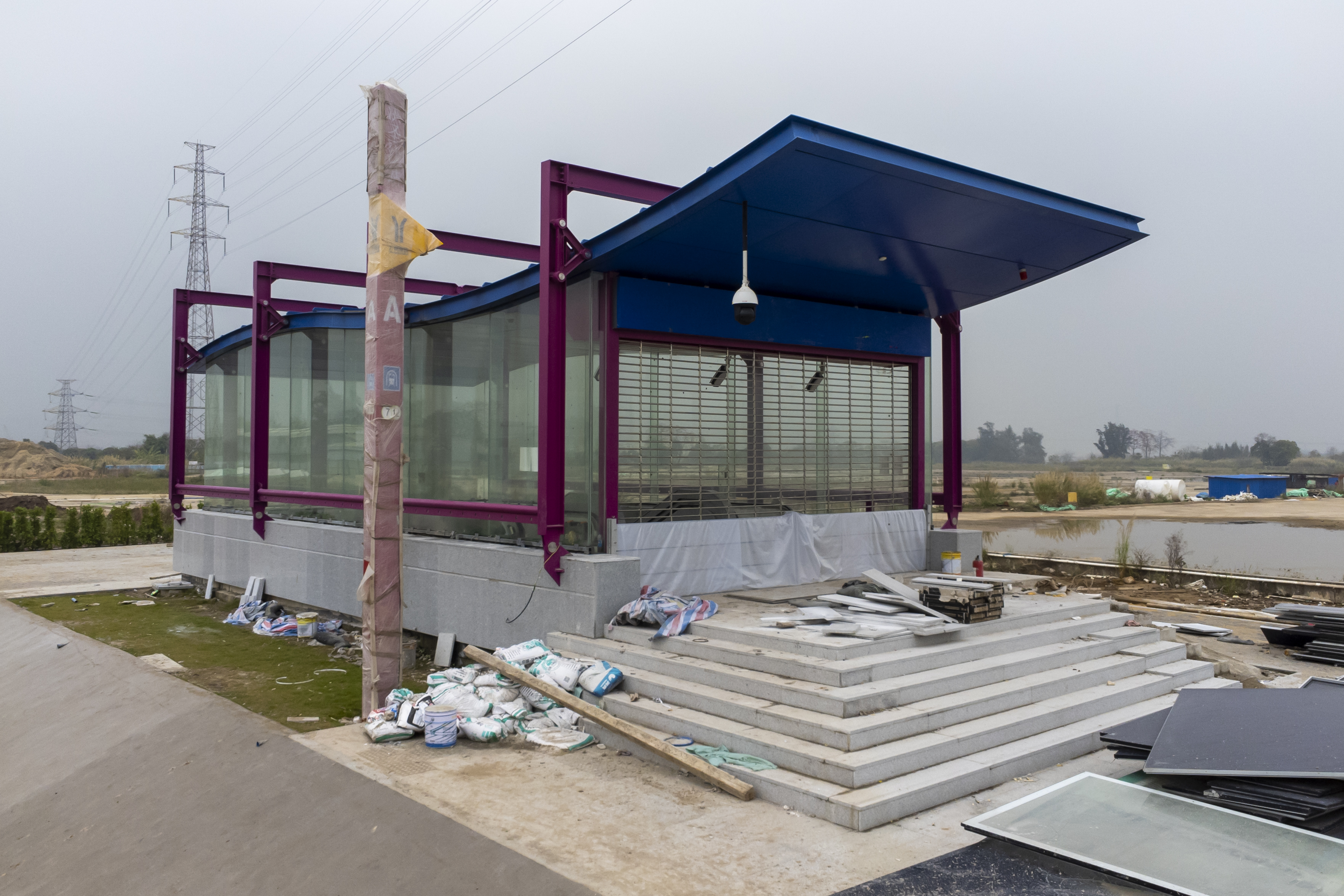
Entrance A

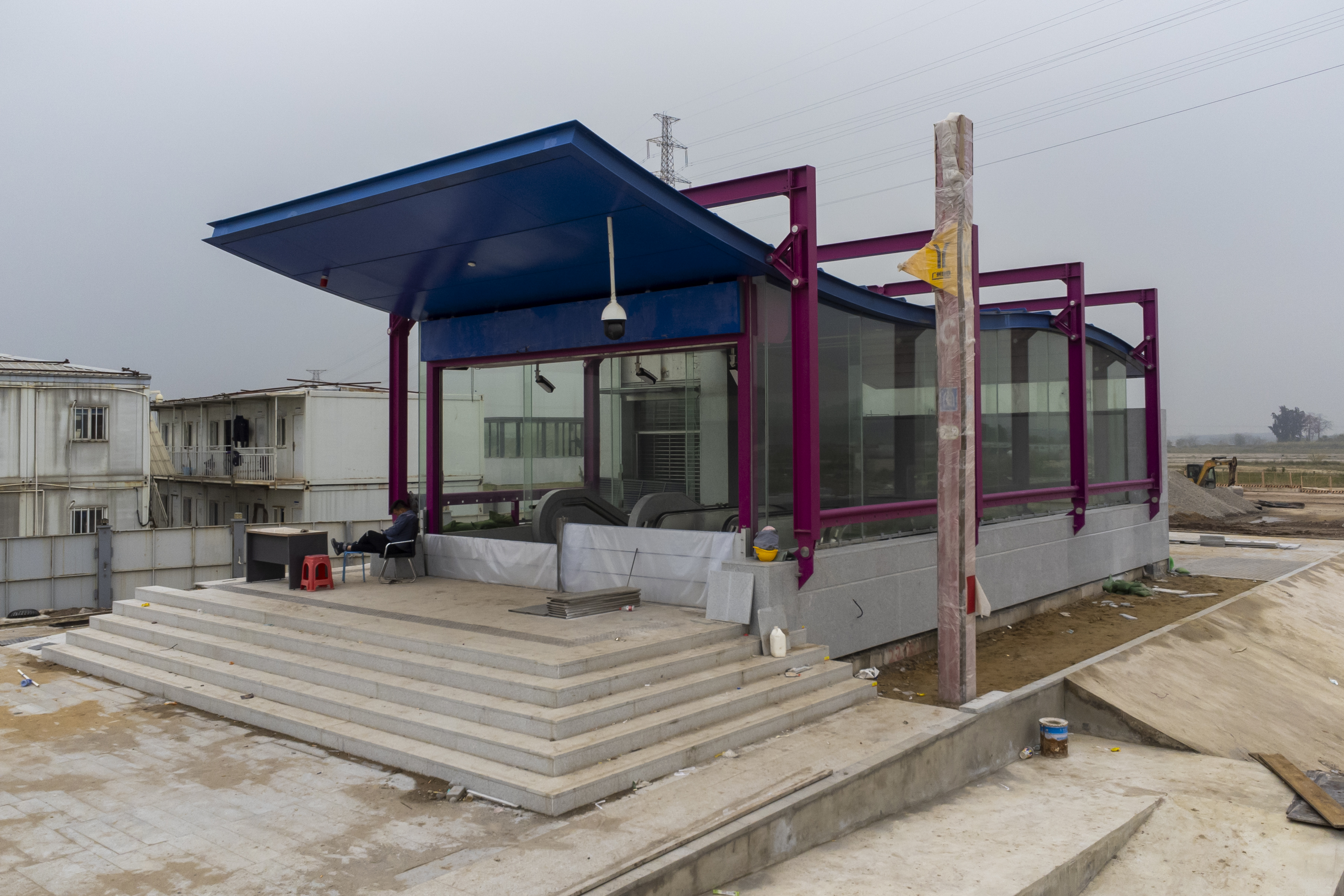
Entrance C

== History ==
Although the route of Line 7 to Huangpu in the early planning stage will pass through Hongshengsha Island, it did not set up a station on the island until 2016. Eventually, the station was included in the second phase of Line 7 for construction. At the same time, in order to cooperate with the setting of the station, Guangzhou Port Co. Ltd., the owner of the original site of the station, handed over the island to the Huangpu District Land Development Center for collection and preservation. Construction started on 18 April 2019, the construction of the main envelope structure was completed in April 2020. In May 2021, the main structure of the station successfully topped out, making it the first station to do so on the second phase of Line 7.

The station completed the "three rights" transfer on 31 October 2023.
