= Sanxi station =

Guangzhou Metro station

Coordinates: 23.1041°N 113.4156°E

Sanxi 三溪
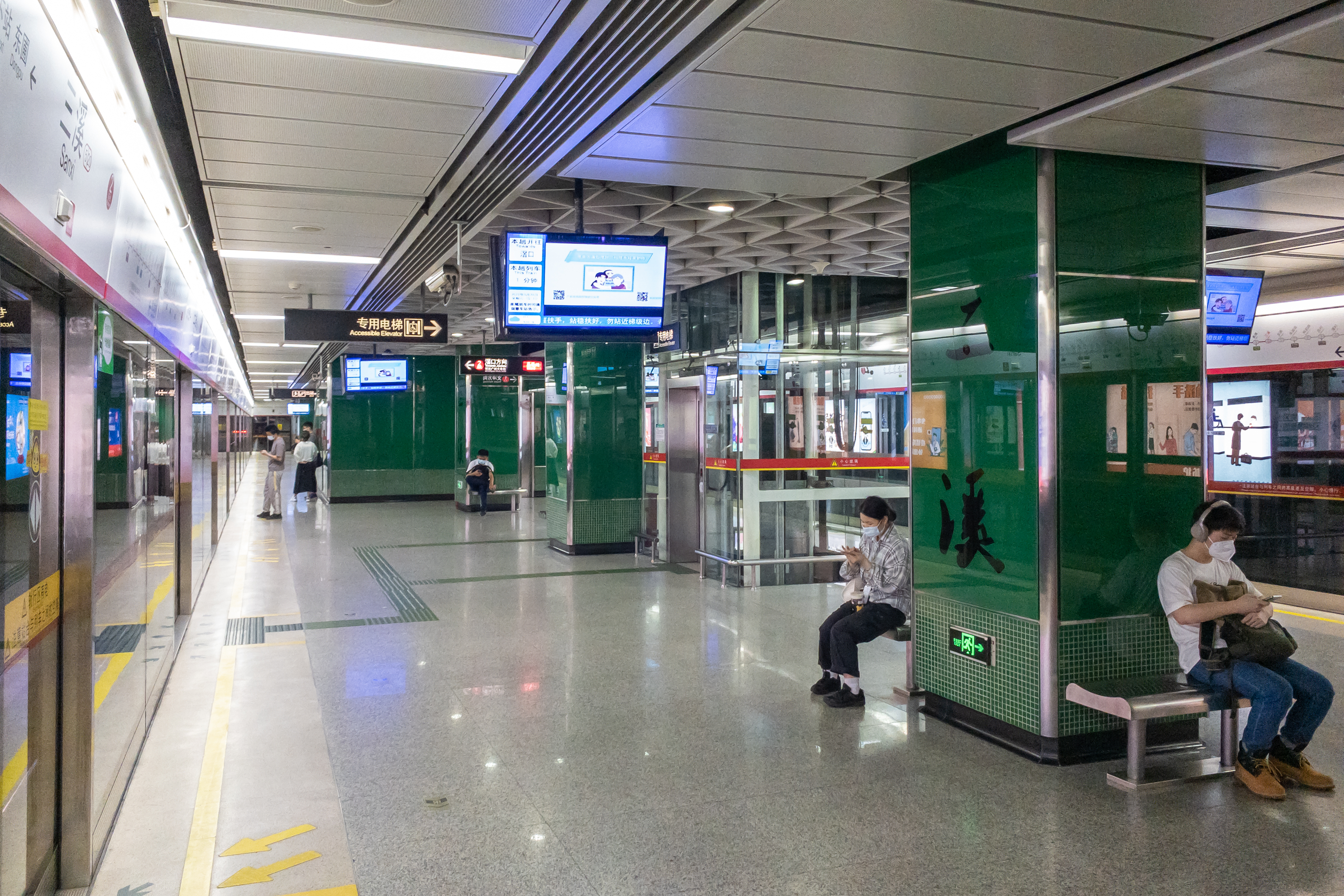

General information
- Location: Huangpu Avenue East (黄埔大道东); Tianhe District, Guangzhou, Guangdong; China
- Operated by: Guangzhou Metro Co. Ltd.
- Line: Line 5
- Platforms: 2 (1 island platform)

Construction
- Structure type: Underground

Other information
- Station code: 520

History
- Opened: 28 December 2009; 16 years ago

Services
Preceding station	Guangzhou Metro	Following station
Dongpu towards Jiaokou	Line 5	Yuzhu towards Huangpu New Port
Location

Sanxi Station (Chinese: 三溪站; pinyin: Sānxī Zhàn; Jyutping: saam^{1}kai^{1} zaam^{6}; lit. 'three brooks'), formerly Yuzhu Station (鱼珠站) during planning, is a station on Line 5 of the Guangzhou Metro. It is located under Huangpu Avenue East (黄埔大道东) near Tangxiachong (棠下涌) in the Tianhe District. It opened on 28 December 2009.
