= Yufengwei station =

Guangzhou Metro Line 7 and Line 13 station

Yufengwei 裕丰围
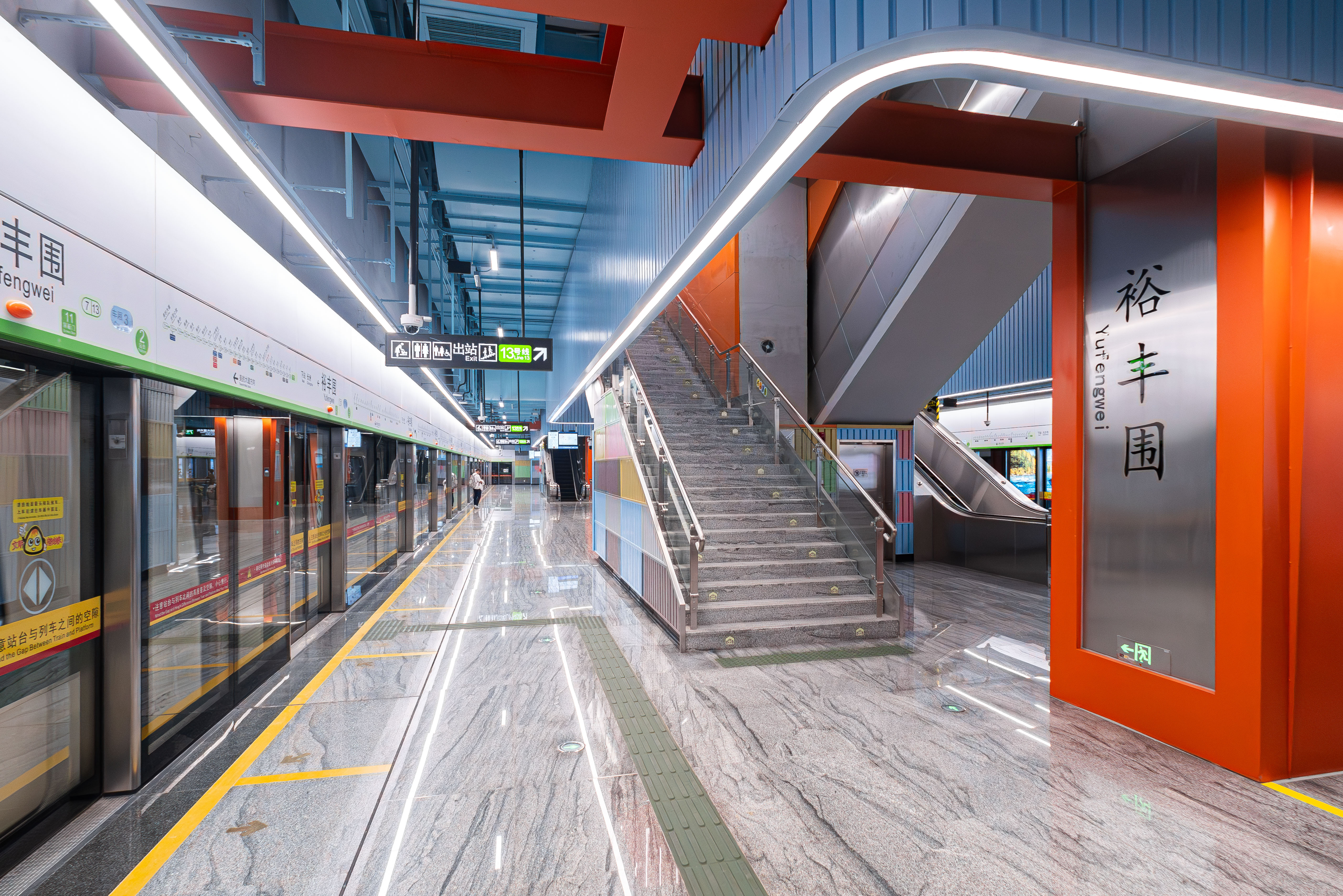
- Line 7 platform

Chinese name
- Simplified Chinese: 裕丰围站
- Traditional Chinese: 裕豐圍站
Transcriptions
Standard Mandarin
- Hanyu Pinyin: Yùfēngwéi Zhàn
Yue: Cantonese
- Yale Romanization: Yuhfūngwài Jaahm
- Jyutping: Jyu^{6}fung^{1}wai^{4} Zaam^{6}

General information
- Location: Intersection of Haiyuan Road (海員路) and Fengle South Road (豐樂南路); Huangpu Subdistrict, Huangpu District, Guangzhou, Guangdong; China
- Coordinates: 23°5′51.10″N 113°26′56.83″E
- Operator: Guangzhou Metro Co. Ltd.
- Lines: Line 7; Line 13

Construction
- Structure type: Underground
- Accessible: Yes

Other information
- Station code: 713 1325

History
- Opened: Line 13: 28 December 2017 (8 years ago); Line 7: 28 December 2023 (2 years ago)

Services
Preceding station	Guangzhou Metro	Following station
Changzhou towards Meidi Dadao	Line 7	Dashadong towards Yanshan
Yuzhu towards Tianhe Park	Line 13	Shuanggang towards Xinsha
Future services
Hongshengsha towards Meidi Dadao	Line 7	Dashadong towards Yanshan
Location

Yufengwei station (simplified Chinese: 裕丰围站; traditional Chinese: 裕豐圍站; pinyin: Yùfēngwéi Zhàn; Cantonese Yale: Yuhfūngwài Jaahm) is an interchange station between Line 7 and Line 13 of the Guangzhou Metro, located in Guangzhou's Huangpu District. Line 13 opened on 28 December 2017, whilst Line 7 opened on 28 December 2023.

== Station layout ==
The station has three underground floors. The ground is the entrance and exit, and it is surrounded by Fengle South Road, Gangqian Road, the planned Bay Area Avenue, Huangpu Port Wharf and other buildings. The first floor is the concourse, the second floor is the Line 13 platform, the buffer level, equipment level of Line 7 and the partial reserved structure of Line 25, and the third floor is the Line 7 platform.

This station is one of the two culturally themed stations of the second phase of Line 7, with the theme "Port Impression", and the walls are decorated with colorful container elements, with orange wall columns and blue ceiling pipes, to resemble the busy scene of a port. The Line 13 station adopts the standard gray-green glass curtain panel of the Line 13 first phase and the wavy ceiling design running through the front and rear ends.

The station has three toilets and nursery rooms, which are located at the western end of the Line 13 platform, the middle of the fare-paid area of the Line 7 concourse and the fare-paid area near the Exit D passage.

G	-	Exits A-E
L1; Concourse	Lobby	Ticket Machines, Customer Service, Shops, Police Station, Security Facilities, Toilets, Nursery
L2; Platforms	Platform 4	13 towards Tianhe Park (Yuzhu)
L2; Platforms	Island platform, doors will open on the left (Toilets, Nursery); towards 7 platforms
L2; Platforms	Platform 3	13 towards Xinsha (Shuanggang)
L2; Platforms	Mezzanine (Line 7)	Stairs linking Line 7 platform with concourse Station Equipment
L2; Platforms		Reserved interchange interface with Line 25
L3; Platforms	Platform 2	7 towards Meidi Dadao (Changzhou)
L3; Platforms	Island platform, doors will open on the left; towards 13 platforms
L3; Platforms	Platform 1	7 towards Yanshan (Dashadong)

=== Concourse ===
The concourse is arranged in a "7" shape, with Line 7 in the north-south direction and Line 13 in the east-west direction. There are ticket vending machines and a smart customer service center.

The west part of the Line 7 concourse and the central part of the Line 13 concourses are divided into fare-paid areas. There is a dedicated elevator in the fare-paid area of the concourse on both lines, as well as multiple sets of escalators and stairs for passengers to travel between the concourse and platforms.

=== Platforms and transfers ===
The station has underground island platforms each on Lines 7 and 13, with Line 7 on the lower level and Line 13 on the upper level. Among them, the platform of Line 7 is located underground on Fengle South Road, and the platform of Line 13 is located underground on the planned Bay Area Avenue. On the eve of the opening of Line 7 Phase II, the original platform number of Line 13 was changed to 3 and 4, and the original numbers 1 and 2 were transferred to Line 7 to comply with the platform numbering rules of Guangzhou Metro.

In addition, Line 7 of this station has a single crossing line at the northern end of the platform to connect the up and down main lines.

For transferring, the two lines connect the north end of Line 7 and the east end of the Line 13 platform through two escalators and stairs between the second and third floors, allowing passengers to transfer between the two lines. Transfer is also available via the concourse.

=== Entrances/exits ===
The station has 5 points of entry/exit, of which Exits A, D and E are located at the Line 7 concourse, whilst Exits B and C are located at the Line 13 concourse. Exits C and E are equipped with elevators.

- A: Fengle South Road
- B: Fengle South Road
- C: Fengle South Road
- D: Fengle South Road, Guangzhou Municipal Public Security Bureau Port and Navigation Branch
- E: Fengle South Road
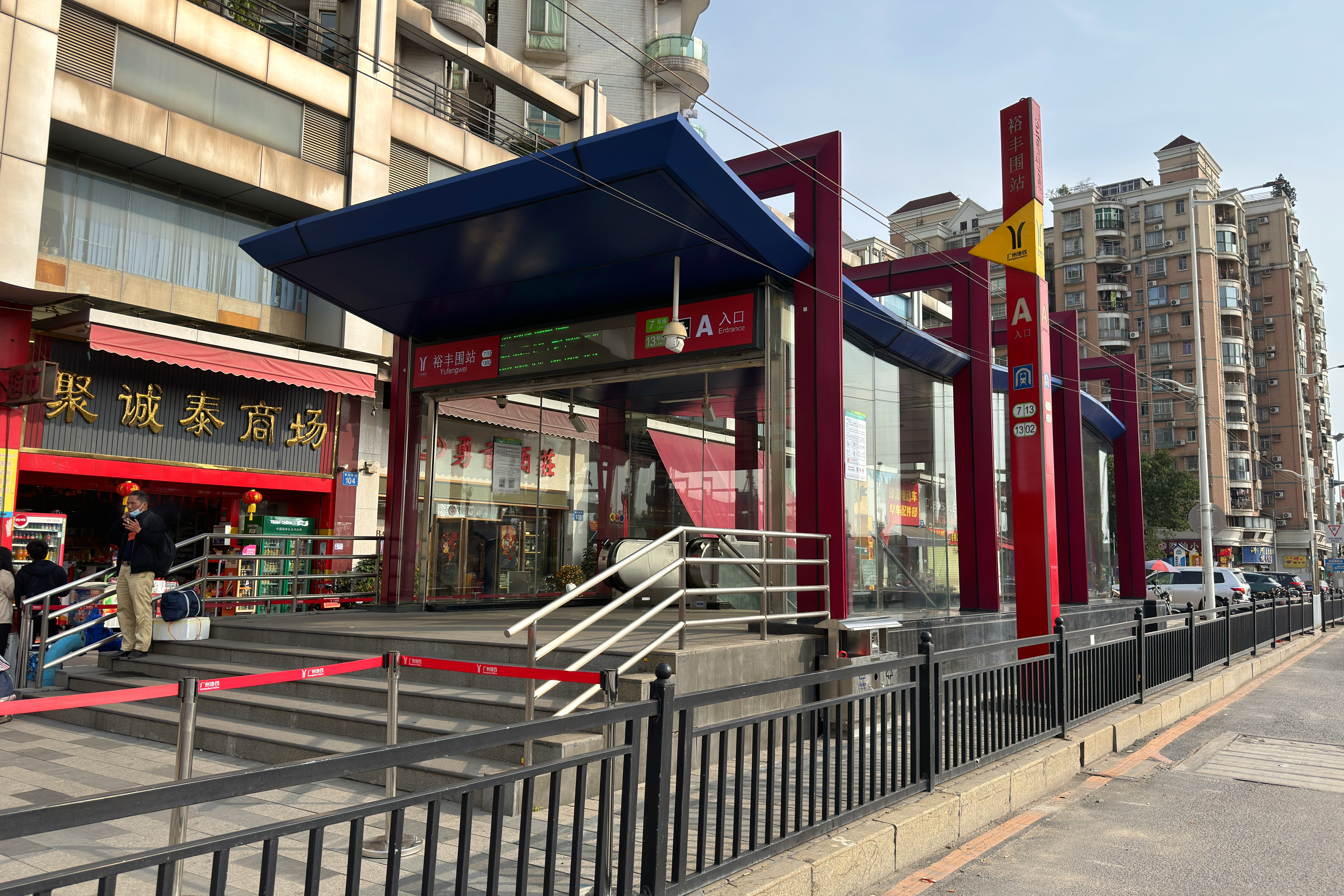
Entrance A

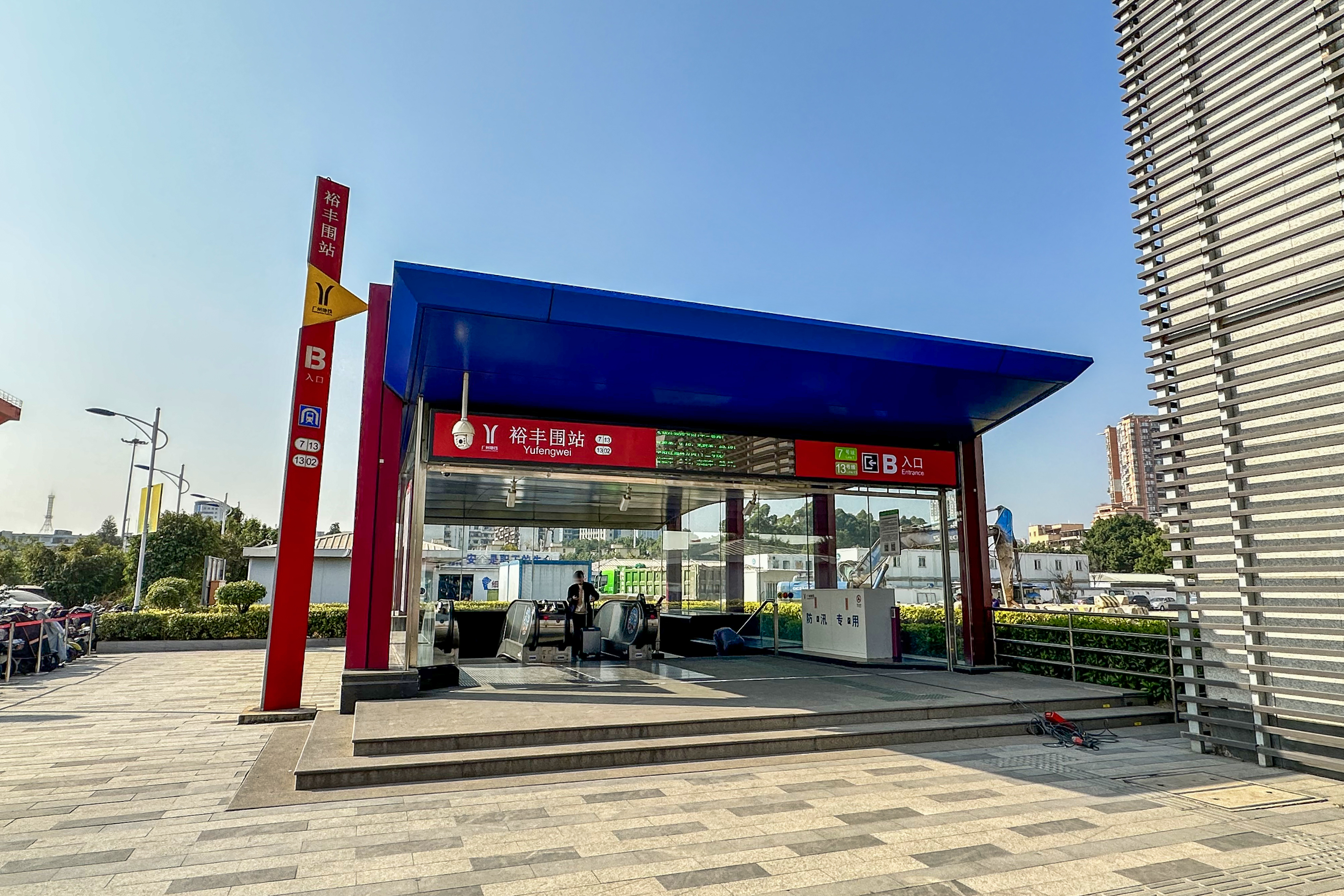
Entrance B

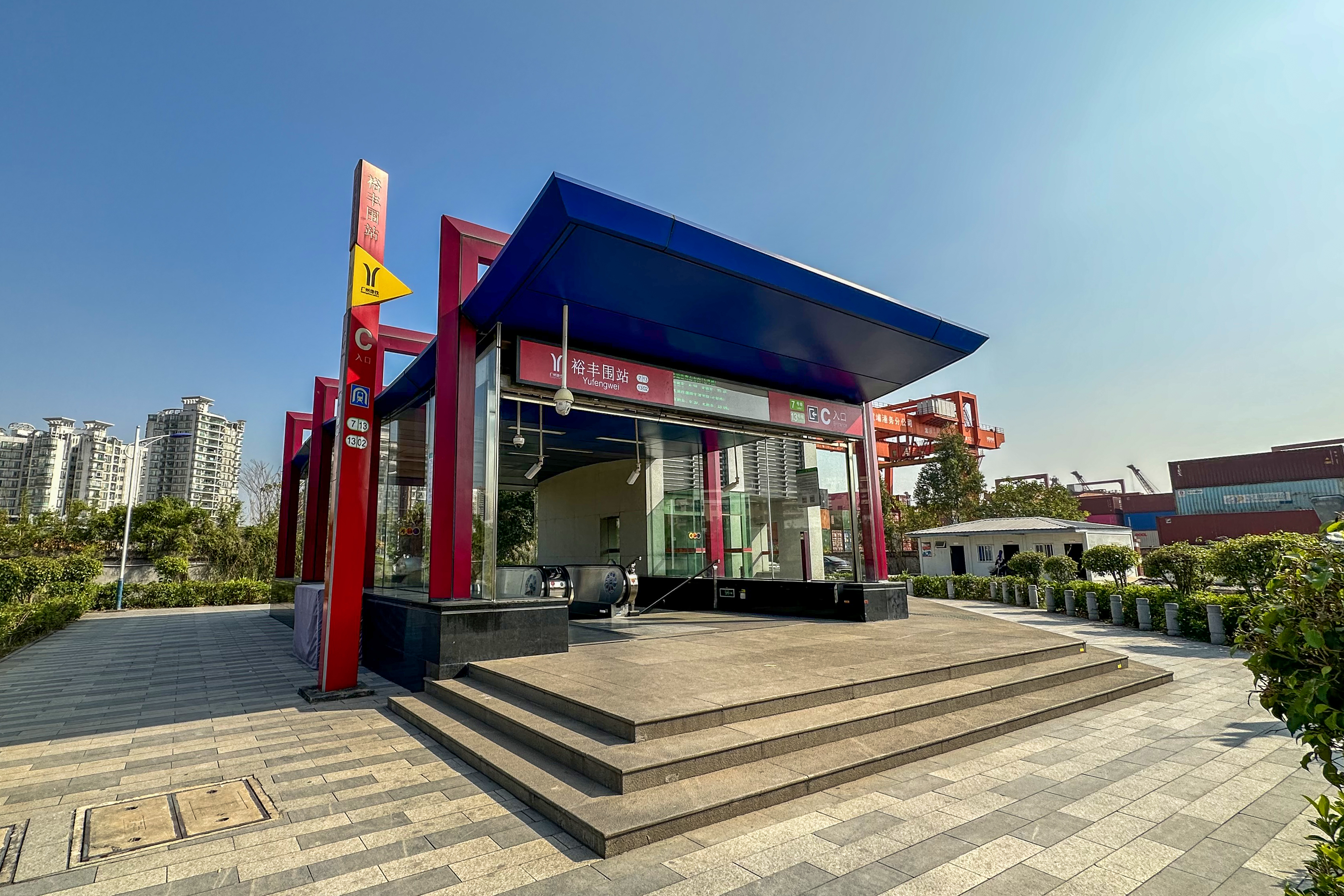
Entrance C

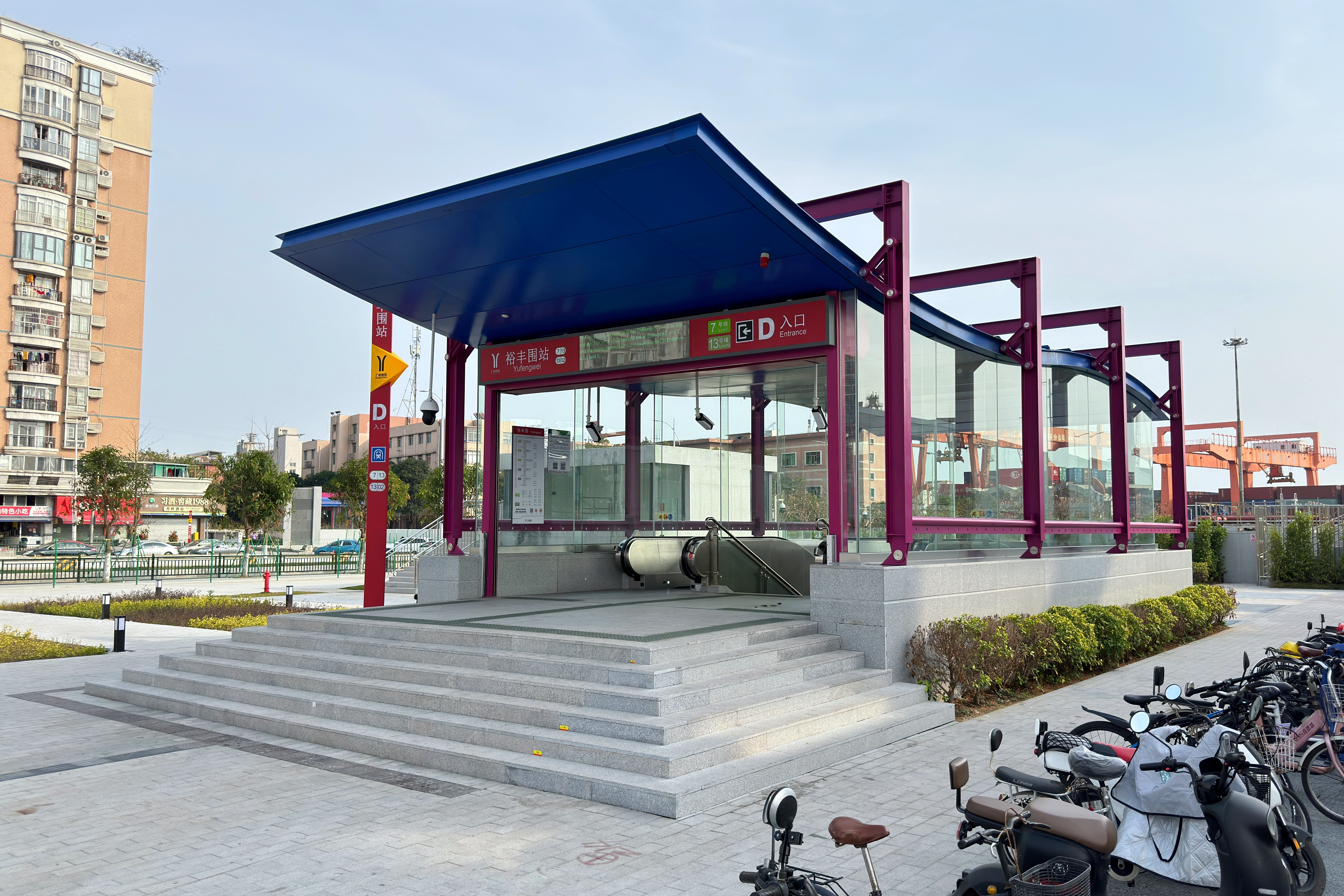
Entrance D

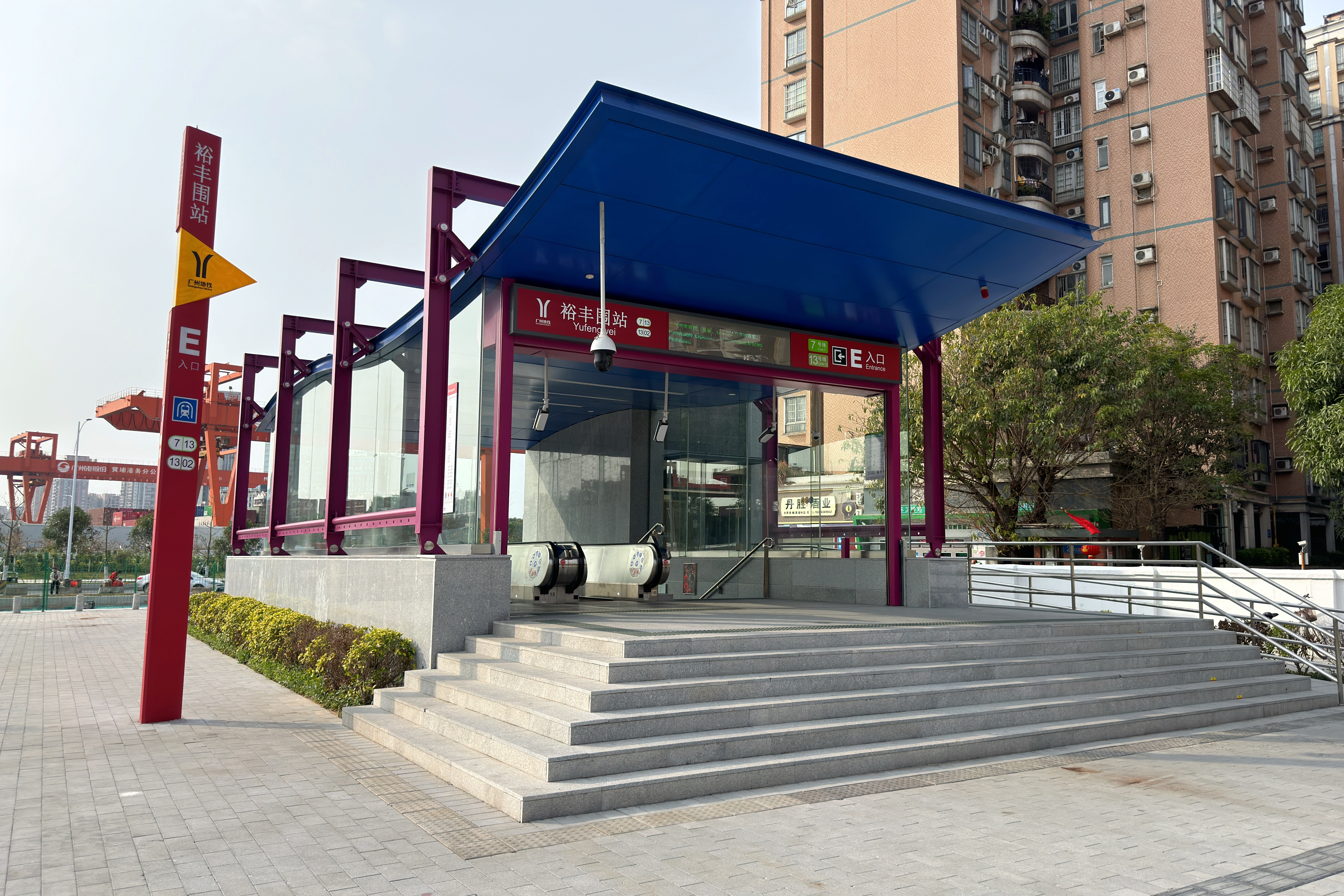
Entrance E

== Gallery ==
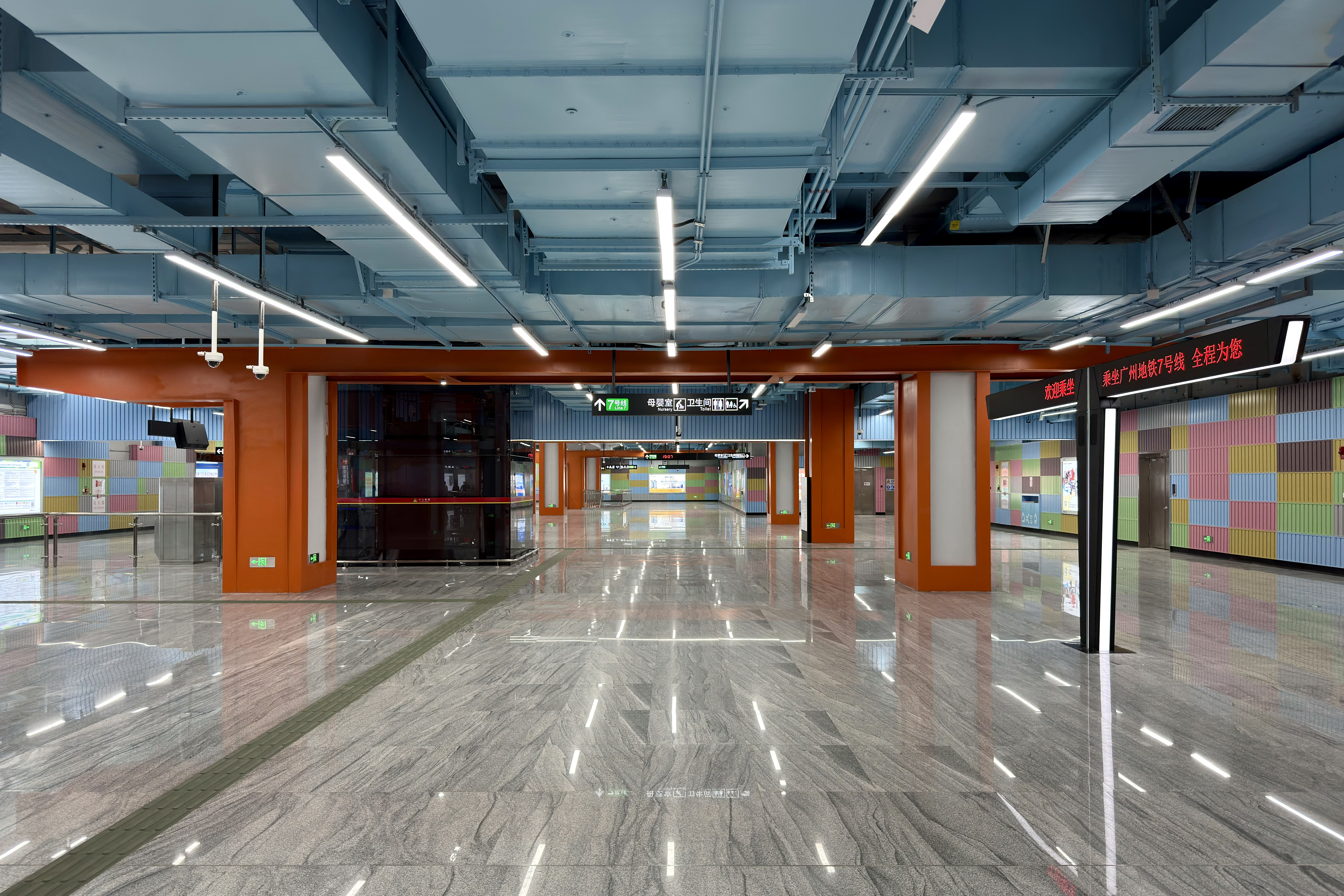
Line 7 concourse

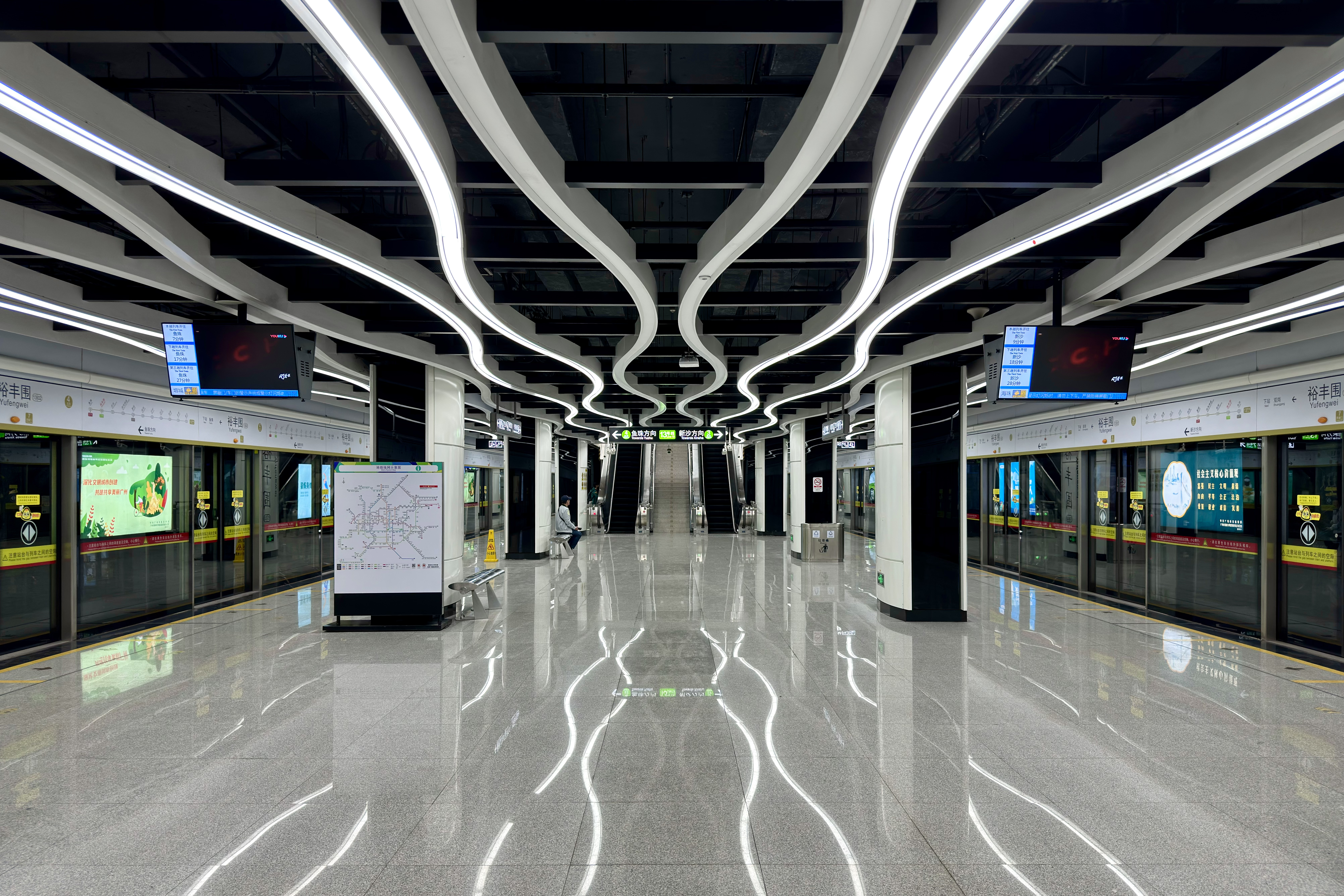
Line 13 platform

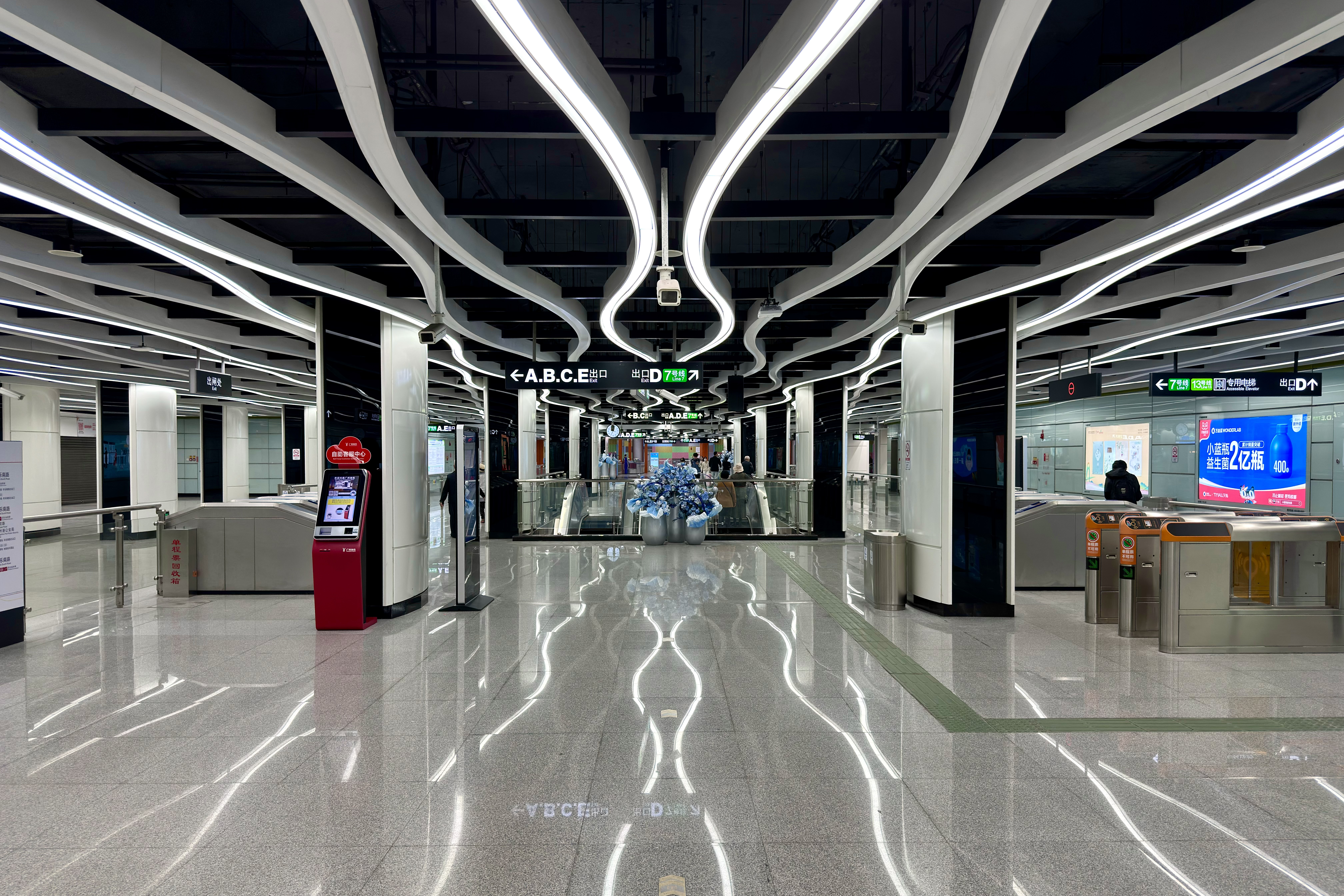
Line 13 concourse

== History ==
The station first appeared in the 2003 subway planning plan as an interchange station for Lines 5 and 7, and its location is roughly the same as it is now. Later, the plan was partially modified, and the station became an interchange station for Lines 14 and 7 at that time. Subsequently, in the 2008 plan, the original Line 14 was split and reorganized into multiple lines, and finally this station was determined to become an interchange station for Line 13 and Line 7, and with the start of construction of Line 13, the transfer node and part of the platform of Line 7 have been reserved at the east end of the station during construction. Later, the planned new Line 25 also has plans to stop at the station, and it became a planned three-line transfer station.

The station was called Fengle Road station during the planning and construction phase, and in the initial station name announcement of each station in the first phase of Line 13, this station was named Yufengwei station. Finally, after the application of Guangzhou Metro Group, the Geographical Names Office of the Guangzhou Civil Affairs Bureau determined that Yufengwei station was the official name of the station.

On 10 January 2017, the main structure of the Line 13 station topped out. On 28 December, the station opened with the opening of the first phase of Line 13, and the station was assigned the station number "13-02" until the opening of the first section of the second phase of Line 13.

The main structure of the Line 7 station topped out on 30 November 2022 and fully entered the mechanical and electrical construction stage in January 2023. Exit A was temporarily closed on 17 February 2023 to coincide with the partial reconstruction of the concourse for Line 7.

On 31 October 2023, the Line 7 station completed the "three rights" transfer. At 12:00 on 28 December the same year, the Line 7 station officially opened with the opening of the second phase of Line 7, and the station became a transfer station.

=== Incident ===
On 22 May 2020, due to the heavy rainstorm from the 2020 China floods in Guangzhou in the early morning, Line 13 was completely suspended, and the station was subsequently closed. It was reopened a week later on 29 May with the resumption of operation of the Yuzhu to Shacun section.

== Future development ==
The planned Line 25 will also set up a station here, and its station is proposed to be located on Gangqian Road, south of the Line 13 station, making this station one of the three-line interchange hubs of the Guangzhou Metro. The second phase of Line 7 has reserved an interchange node for Line 25 during construction, but Line 25 is long-term planned line and there is no construction timetable.
