= Memorial Museum of 1911 Revolution =

- Established: October 8, 2011
- Location: Changzhou Island, Huangpu District, Guangzhou City
- Type: History museum
- Website: www.xhgmjng.com

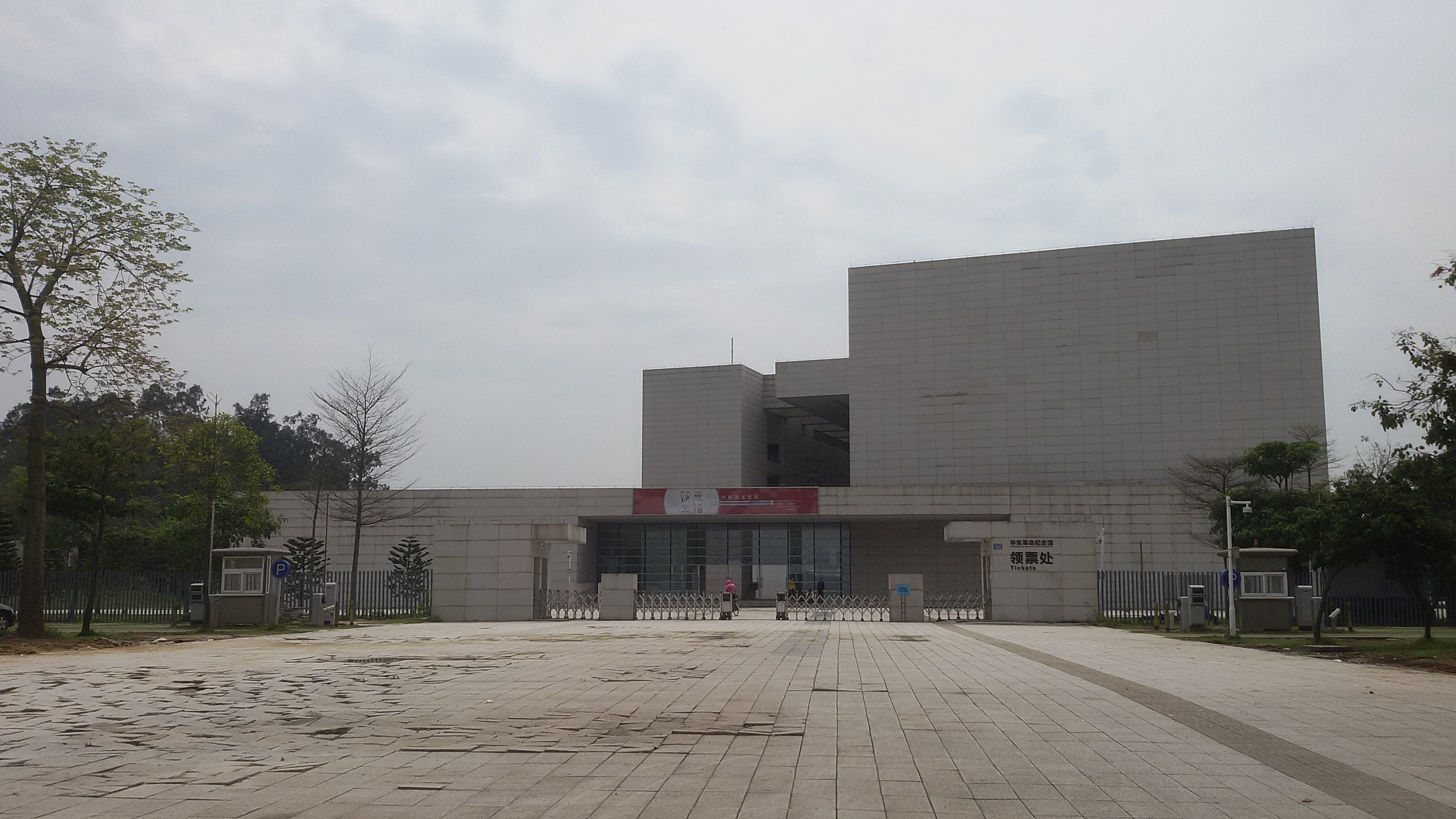
Revolution Memorial Hall, Guangzhou city

The Memorial Museum of 1911 Revolution (simplified Chinese: 辛亥革命纪念馆; traditional Chinese: 辛亥革命紀念館), also known as Xinhai Revolution Memorial Hall, is a Guangzhou-based thematic memorial hall built to commemorate the Xinhai Revolution, with a total investment of RMB 319 million. The museum is located in Changzhou Island, Huangpu District, Guangzhou City.

== History ==
Memorial Museum of 1911 Revolution was officially opened on October 8, 2011, with a main building area of 18,228 square meters.
