= Yuangang station =

Guangzhou Metro station

Yuangang 员岗
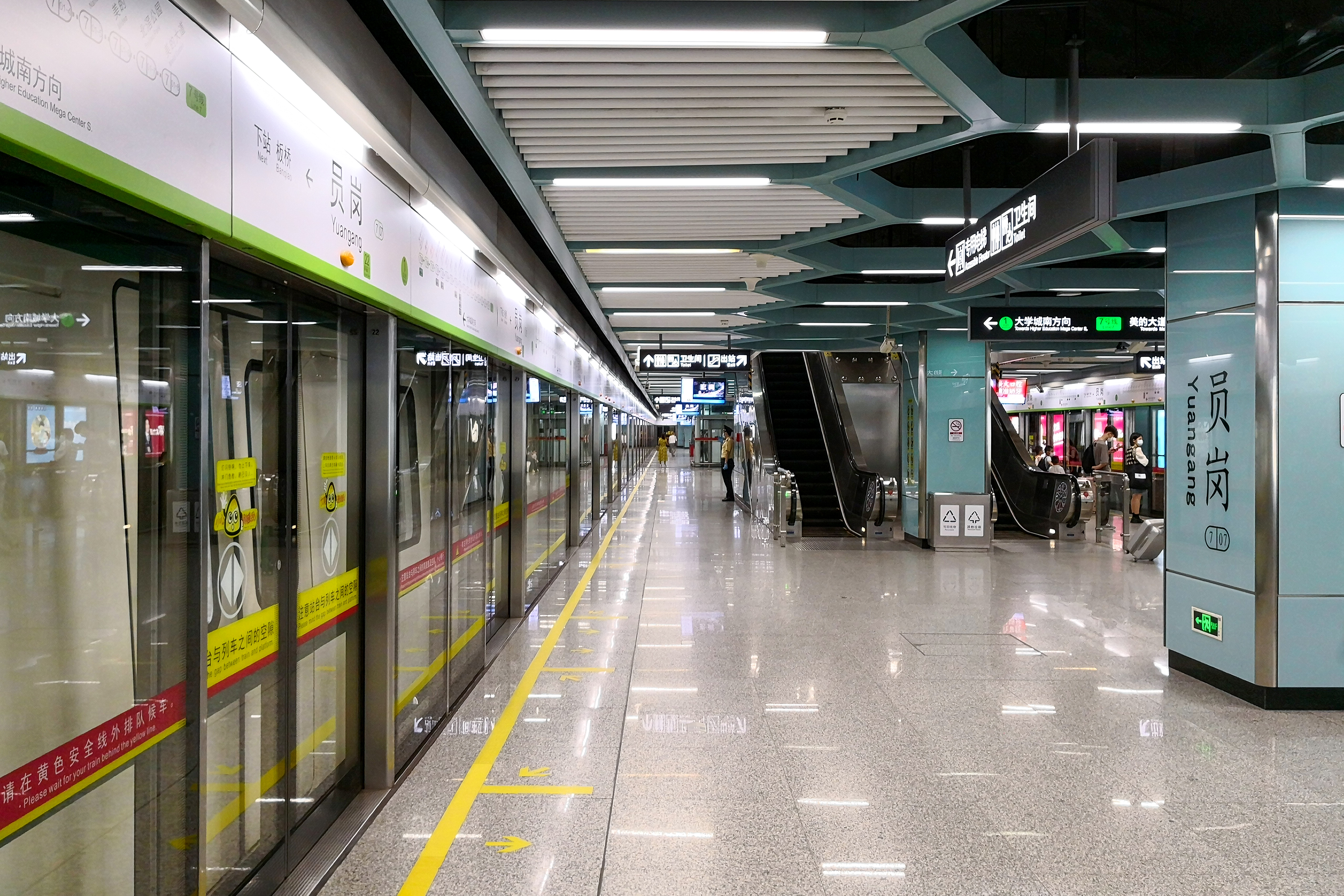
- Platform of the station

Chinese name
- Simplified Chinese: 员岗站
- Traditional Chinese: 員崗站
Transcriptions
Standard Mandarin
- Hanyu Pinyin: Yuángǎng Zhàn
Yue: Cantonese
- Jyutping: jyun^{4}gong^{1} zaam^{6}

General information
- Location: Panyu District, Guangzhou, Guangdong; China
- Coordinates: 23°00′57″N 113°21′56″E
- Operated by: Guangzhou Metro Co. Ltd.
- Line: Line 7
- Platforms: 2 (1 island platform)

Construction
- Structure type: Underground

Other information
- Station code: 707

History
- Opened: 28 December 2016; 9 years ago

Services
Preceding station	Guangzhou Metro	Following station
Nancun Wanbo towards Meidi Dadao	Line 7	Banqiao towards Yanshan
Location

Yuangang Station (Chinese: 员岗站) is a station of Line 7 on the Guangzhou Metro. The station is situated under Nanda Avenue (南大干线), located in Panyu District, Guangzhou. It began operations on 28 December 2016.

== Station layout ==
G	Street level	Exit
L1; Concourse	Lobby	Customer Service, Vending Machines, Security Office
L2; Platforms	Platform 2	7 towards Meidi Dadao (Nancun Wanbo)
L2; Platforms	Island platform, doors will open on the left
L2; Platforms	Platform 1	7 towards Yanshan (Banqiao)

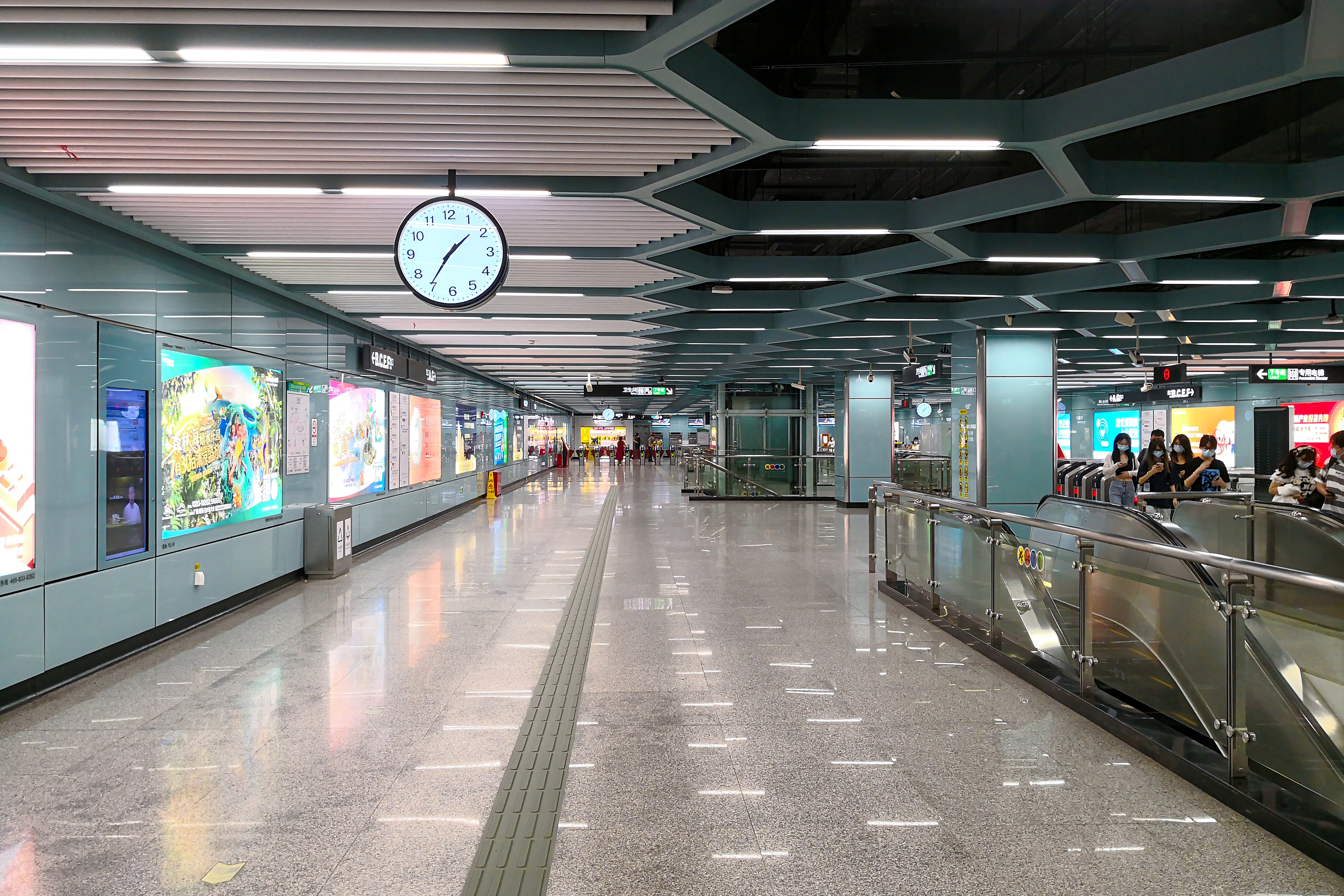
Concourse

== Exits ==
Yuangang station has 6 points of entry/exit, with Exit A being accessible via elevator.

- A: Nanda Avenue
- B: Nanda Avenue
- C: Nanda Avenue
- E: Nanda Avenue
- F: Nanda Avenue
- G: Nanda Avenue
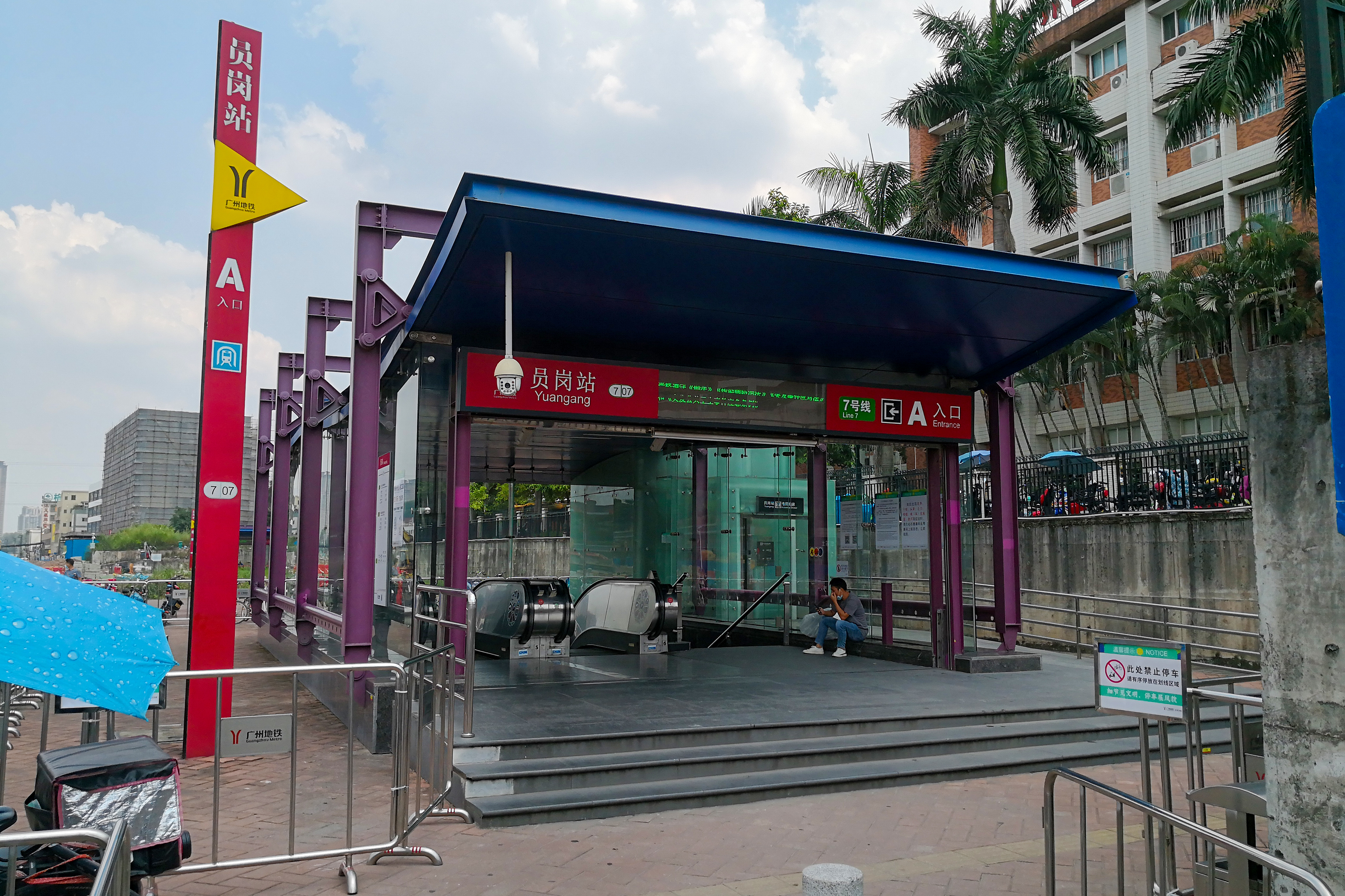
Exit A

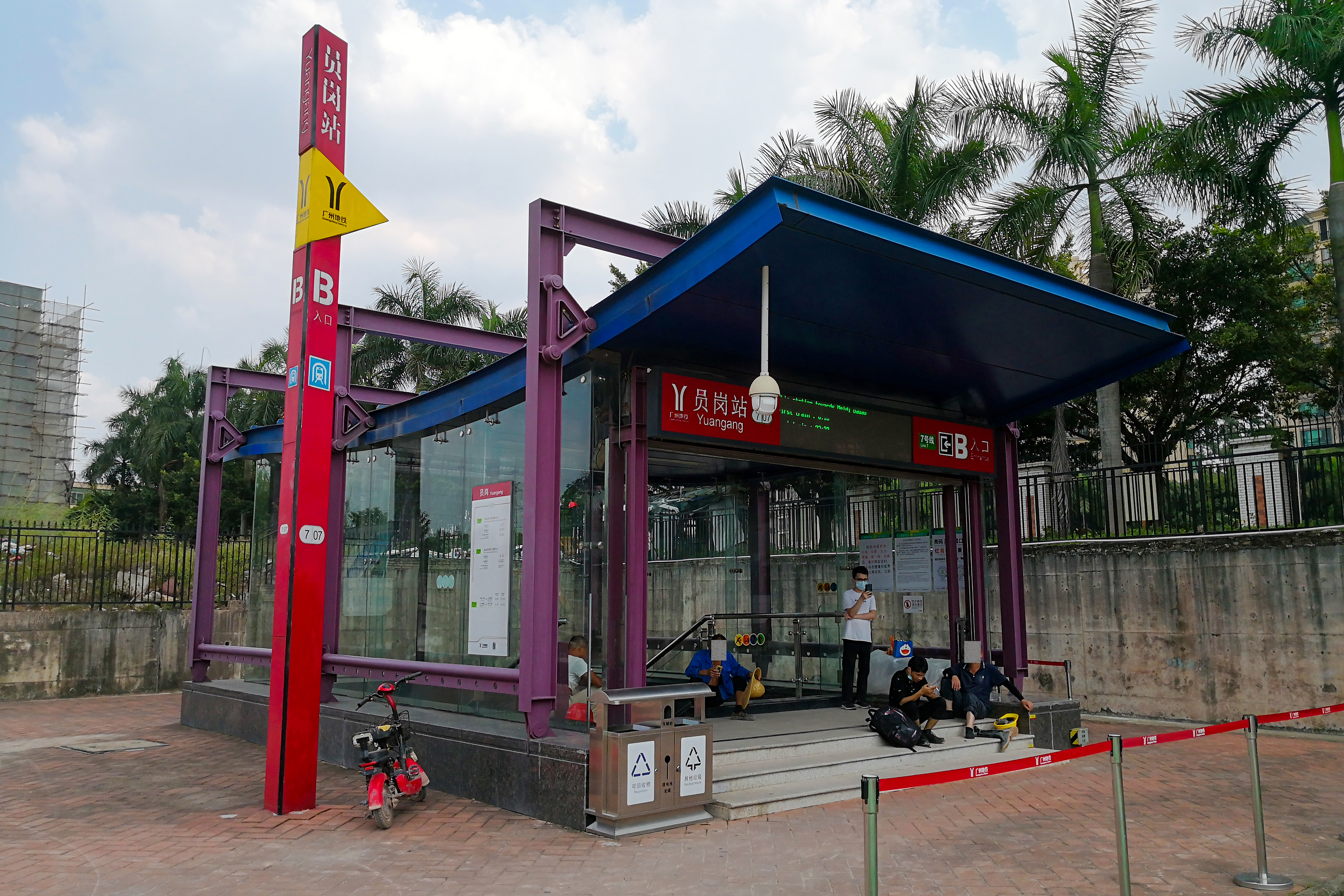
Exit B

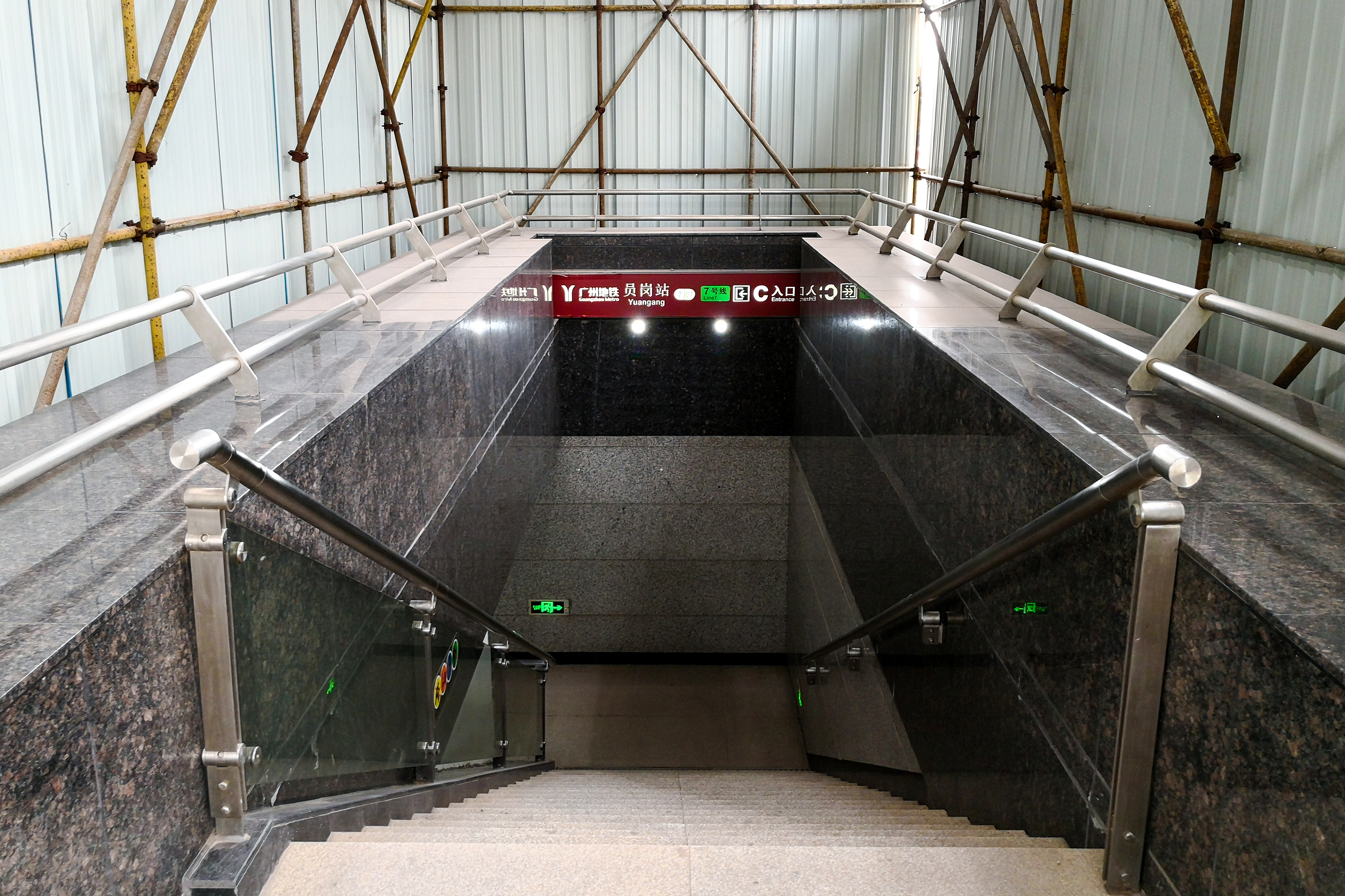
Exit C

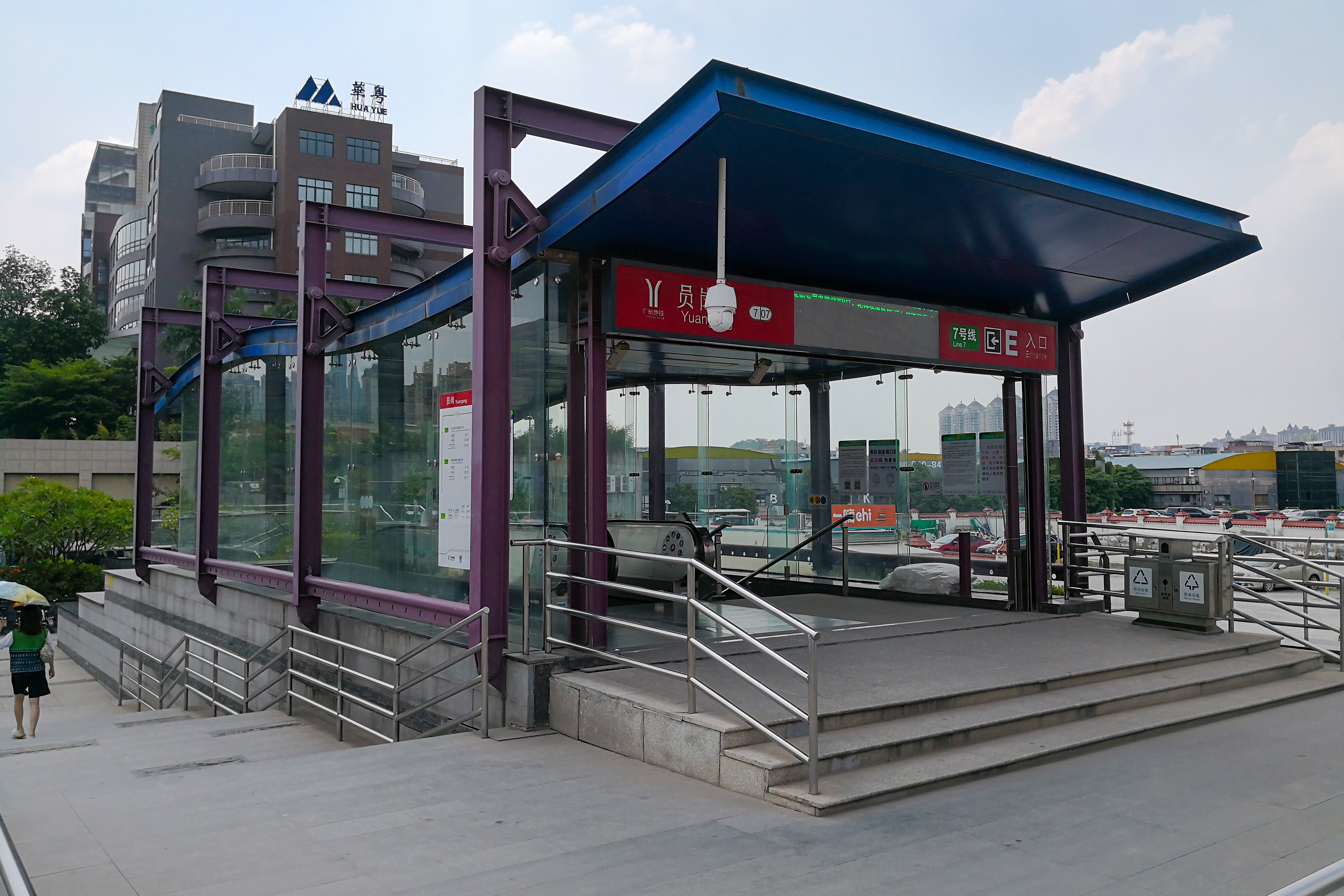
Exit E

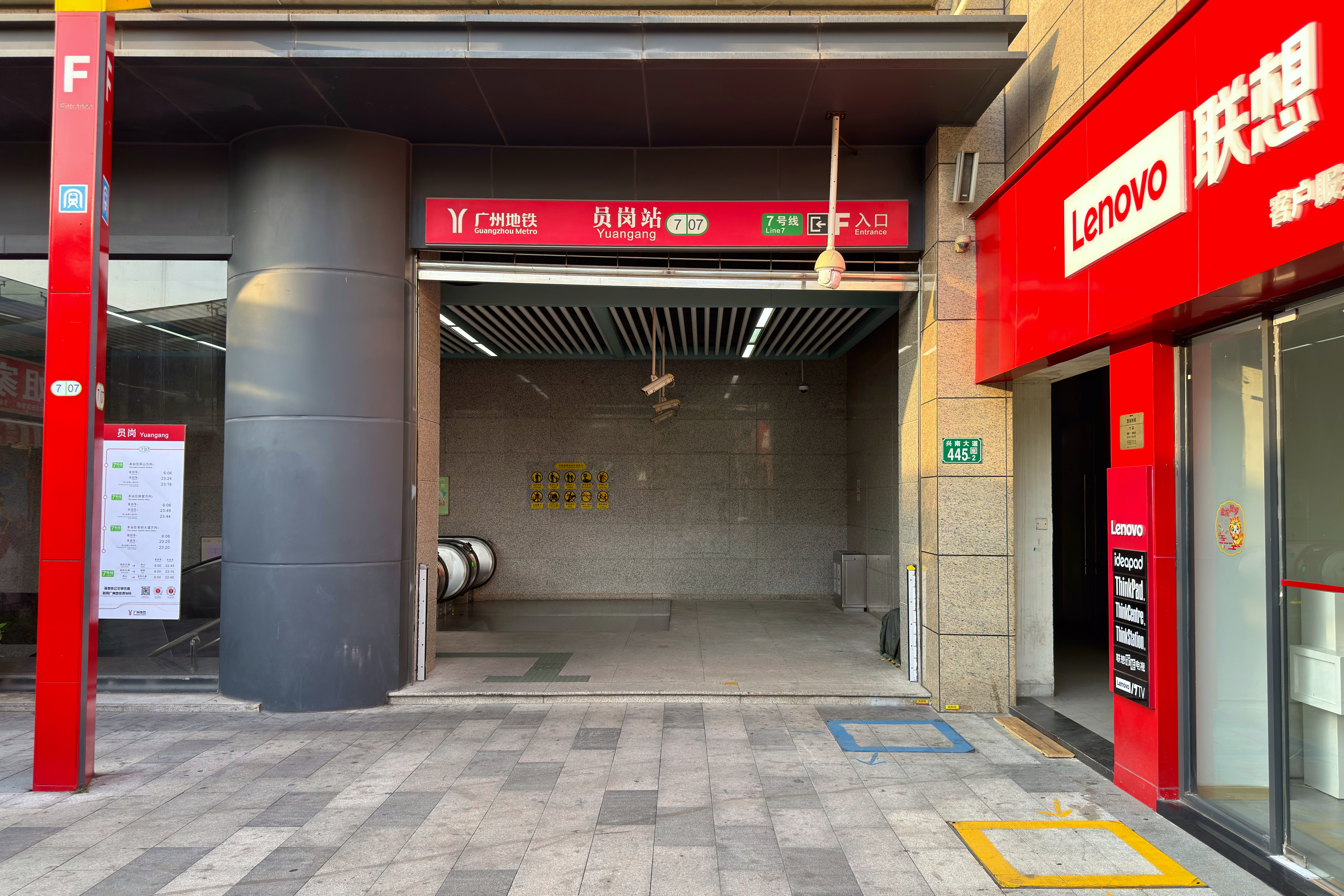
Exit F

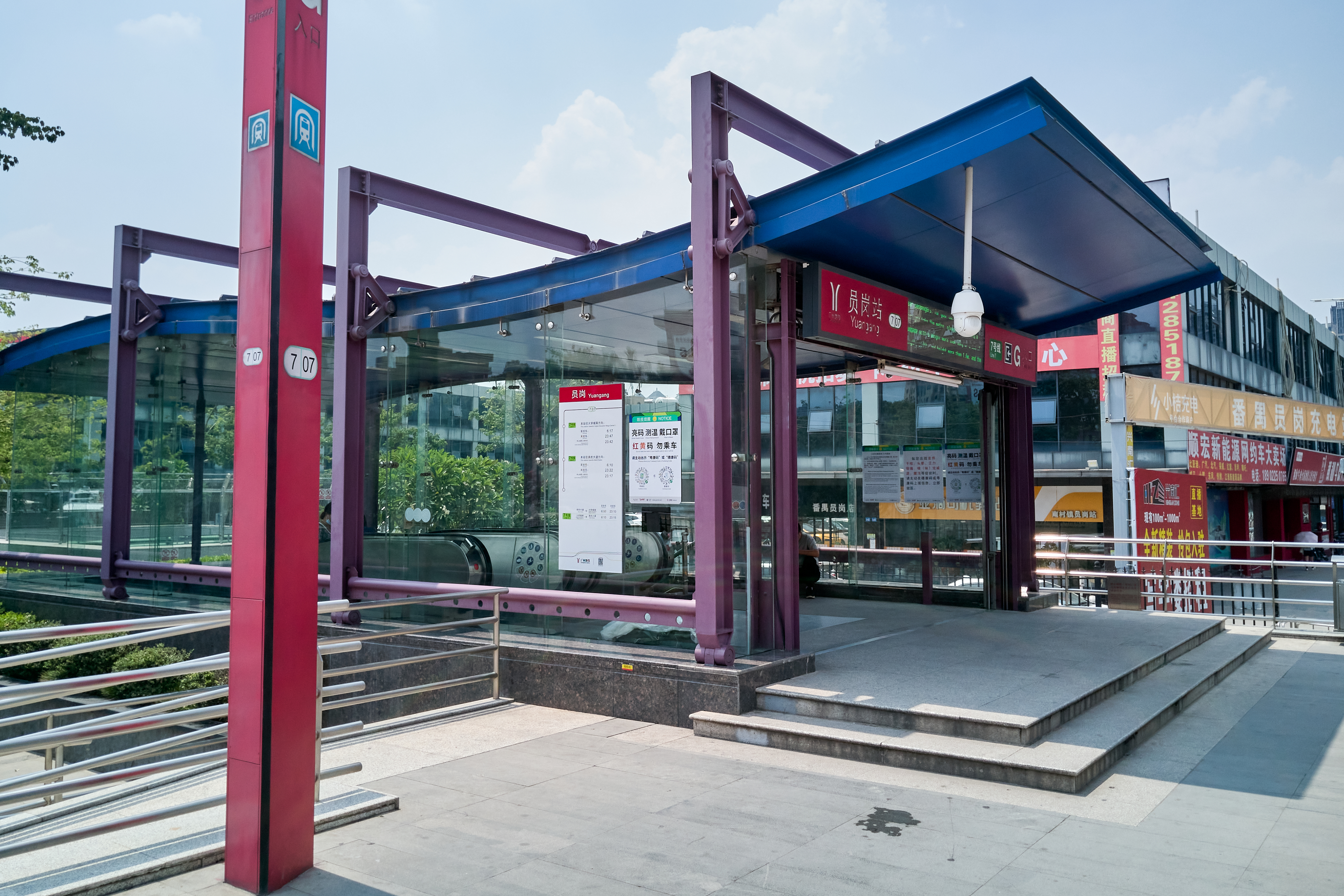
Exit G

== History ==
When Line 7 was originally planned, there were two stations situated under Xingnan Avenue--Guantang Station (Chinese: 官堂站) and Jingkeng Station (Chinese: 金坑站). To accommodate the construction of the Nanda Highway, Line 7 in the Xingnan Avenue section had to lay under the north side of the road, so the original Guantang station did not have enough space to build, and then it merged with the Jinkeng station and moved to the current location.

On November 28, 2013, the station began construction. In July 2014, the station was formally renamed as Yuangang Station (Chinese: 员岗站). The main structure of the station was completed in early August 2015, and it opened on December 28, 2016.
