= Banqiao station (Guangzhou Metro) =

Guangzhou Metro station

Banqiao 板桥
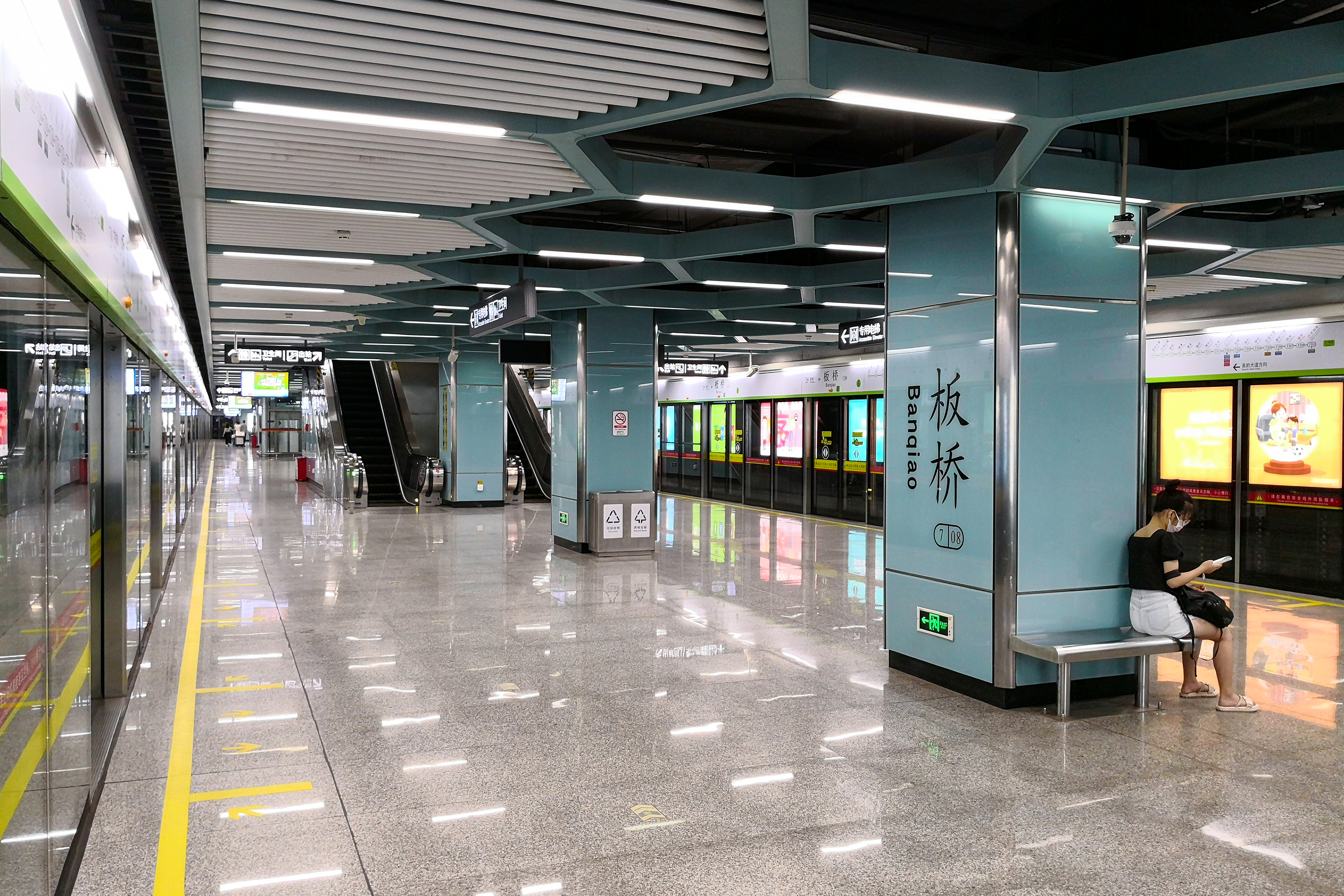
- Platform 1 of the station

Chinese name
- Simplified Chinese: 板桥站
- Traditional Chinese: 板橋站
Transcriptions
Standard Mandarin
- Hanyu Pinyin: Bǎnqiáo Zhàn
Yue: Cantonese
- Jyutping: baan^{2}kiu^{4} zaam^{6}

General information
- Location: Panyu District, Guangzhou, Guangdong; China
- Coordinates: 23°01′01″N 113°23′17″E
- Operated by: Guangzhou Metro Co. Ltd.
- Line: Line 7
- Platforms: 2 (1 island platform)

Construction
- Structure type: Underground

Other information
- Station code: 708

History
- Opened: 28 December 2016; 9 years ago

Services
Preceding station	Guangzhou Metro	Following station
Yuangang towards Meidi Dadao	Line 7	Higher Education Mega Center South towards Yanshan
Location

Banqiao Station (Chinese: 板桥站) is a station of Line 7 on the Guangzhou Metro, formerly known as Nancun Station (南村站) during its planning stages. The station is situated near Agile Beiyuan (雅居乐北苑), located in Panyu District, Guangzhou. It began operations on 28 December 2016.

== Station layout ==
G	Street level	Exit
L1; Concourse	Lobby	Customer Service, Vending Machines, Security Office
L2; Platforms	Platform 2	7 towards Meidi Dadao (Yuangang)
L2; Platforms	Island platform, doors will open on the left
L2; Platforms	Platform 1	7 towards Yanshan (Higher Education Mega Center South)

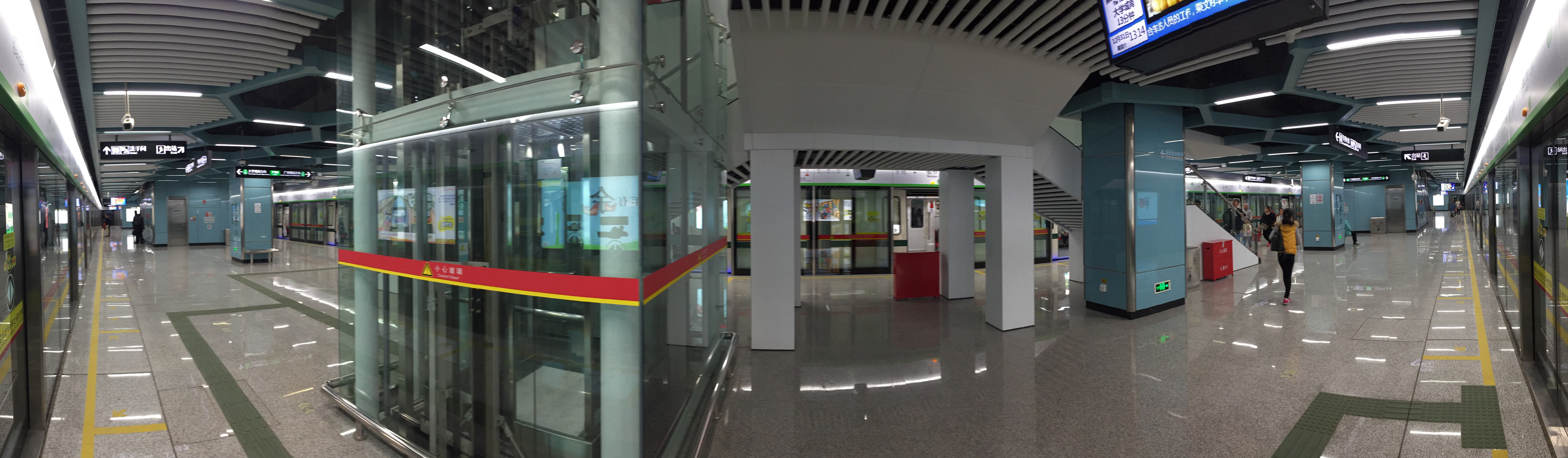
Platform 1 panorama

== Exits ==
Banqiao station currently has three exits.

Exit number	Exit location
Exit A	Jinyuan Road
Exit C	Bohou Road
Exit D	Bohou Road

== History ==
On June 18, 2013, the station began its construction. In July 2014, this station was formally renamed as Banqiao Station (Chinese: 板桥站). The main structure of the station was completed on January 18, 2015, and it began operations on 28 December 2016.
