= Line 7 (Guangzhou Metro) =

Line of the Guangzhou Metro

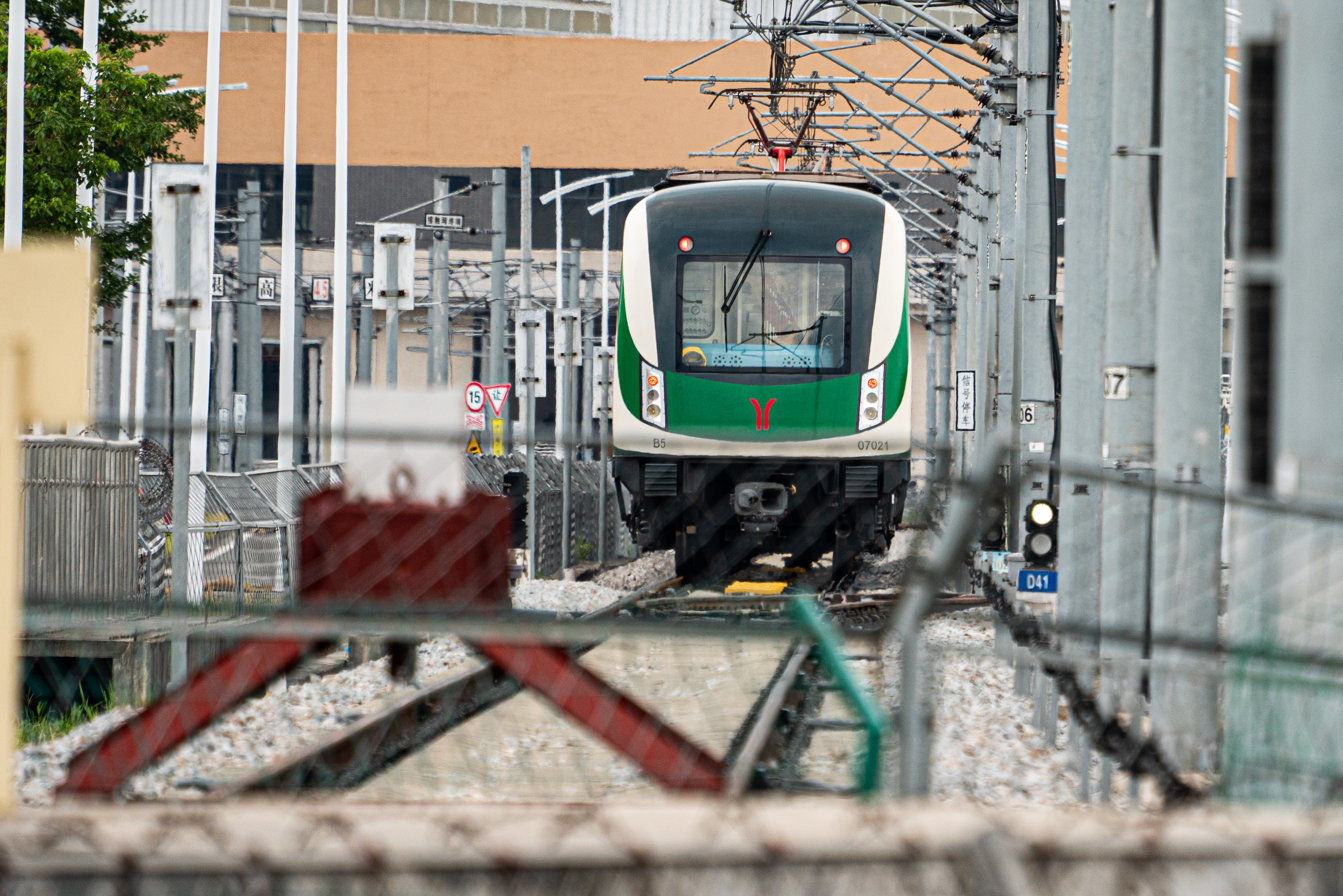
- Line 7 train

Overview
- Other name(s): M7 (plan name); Panyu line (番禺线)
- Status: Operating
- Owner: Phase 1 West Extension: Guangdong Shunguang Rail Transit Co., Ltd. Others: Guangzhou Metro Group Co., Ltd.
- Locale: Guangzhou (Panyu District and Huangpu District), Foshan (Shunde District); Guangdong
- Termini: Meidi Dadao; Yanshan
- Stations: 28 (including 1 complete but unopened) (Note: Hongshengsha station is complete, but it is not open pending development in the area.)

Service
- Type: Rapid transit
- System: Guangzhou Metro
- Services: 1
- Operator: Guangzhou Metro Group
- Daily ridership: 392,100 (2025 daily average)

History
- Opened: December 28, 2016; 9 years ago

Technical
- Line length: 54.24 km (33.70 mi)
- Track gauge: 1,435 mm (56.5 in)
- Operating speed: 90 km/h (56 mph)

Line 7
- Simplified Chinese: 广州地铁7号线
- Traditional Chinese: 廣州地鐵7號線
Transcriptions
Standard Mandarin
- Hanyu Pinyin: Guǎngzhōu Dìtiě Qī Hào Xiàn
Yue: Cantonese
- Jyutping: gwong^{2}zau^{1} dei^{6}tit^{3} cat^{1} hou^{6} sin^{3}

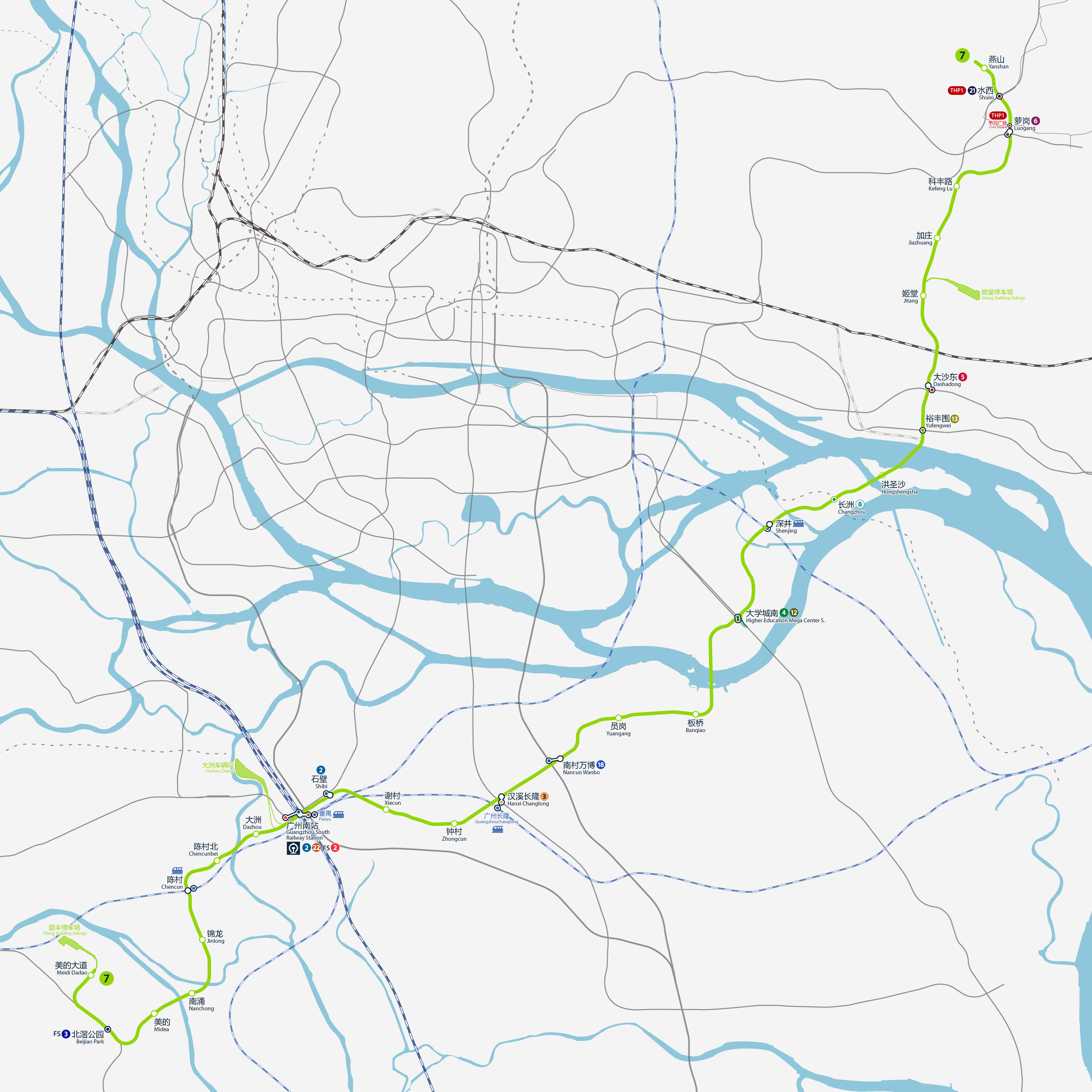
Map of Line 7 drawn to scale

Line 7 of the Guangzhou Metro is a rapid transit line in Guangzhou and Foshan, Guangdong Province, China. It is envisioned as a tangential line that runs across southeast Guangzhou and Foshan, allowing for orbital traffic between the suburbs of Shunde, Panyu and Huangpu to avoid the crowded stations in the city center. Line 7's color is light green.

== History ==
Segment	Commencement	Length	Station(s)	Name
Guangzhou South Railway Station — Higher Education Mega Center South	28 December 2016	18.6 km (11.56 mi)	9	Phase 1
Meidi Dadao — Guangzhou South Railway Station	1 May 2022	13.4 km (8.33 mi)	8	Phase 1 West extension
Higher Education Mega Center South — Yanshan	28 December 2023	22.2 km (13.79 mi)	10	Phase 2

=== Planning ===
A tangential line serving southern Guangzhou was first proposed in 2002 as the Fangcun-Panyu-Huangpu Line. It would have started at Xilang station on Line 1 in the southwest, running southeast to Nanpu, then east along the northern edge of Panyu District. Interchanges were planned at Dashi and Xinzao with what is now Line 3 and Line 4 respectively. Finally the line would cross the Pearl River to terminate at the Guangzhou Economic and Technological Development Zone.

Subsequently, Line 7's design was greatly revised in 2003, with most of the line realigned further south. It would now start at Guangzhou New Passenger Station, what is now Guangzhou South railway station, with the interchange with Line 3 at Hanxi Changlong station. From here, it would turn northeast to meet Line 4 at Higher Education Mega Center, passing Changzhou Island before crossing the Pearl River west of the original plan into Huangpu District.

By 2010, the line had been split into two stages at Higher Education Mega Center South, with stage 1 being the western section from Guangzhou South Railway Station and stage 2 the eastern section to Dashadong.

=== Phase 1 ===
On 16 July 2012, Phase 1 of the line received approval from the National Development and Reform Commission. It would run from Guangzhou South Railway Station to Higher Education Mega Center South, with 9 stations and a total route length of 18.6 km (11.6 mi). The line would share Line 3's control center at Dashi.

On 27 May 2014, the first tunnel section was completed, from Guangzhou South Railway Station to Dazhou depot.

By April 2016, tunnelling and the main structure of all stations was complete.

Phase 1 opened for passenger operation on 28 December 2016.

=== Phase 1 west extension ===
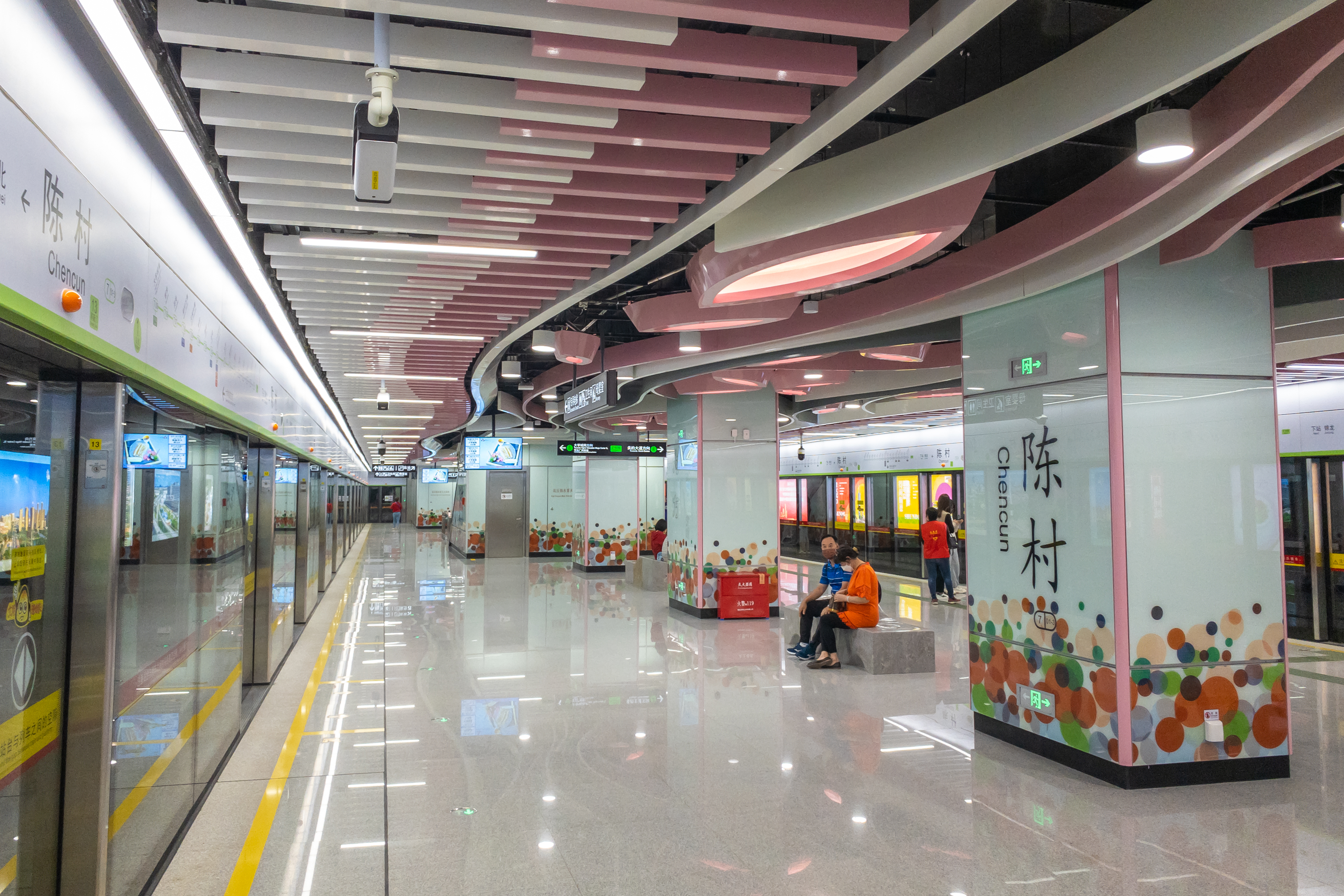
Platform of Chencun

The plan for west extension of the first phase from Guangzhou South Railway Station to Meidi Dadao in Shunde District, Foshan was approved in October 2015. The construction of the west extension to Shunde began in June 2016. The west extension opened on 1 May 2022. The extension is 13.447 km (8.356 mi) in length with 8 stations. It has an interchange with Foshan Metro Line 3 at Beijiao Park.

=== Phase 2 ===
The Northern extension to Yanshan opened on 28 December 2023. It extends the line into Huangpu District, having a total length of 22.2 km (13.79 mi) with 11 stations, 10 of which are operational (Hongshengsha station is complete, but was not opened pending development in the area). It has interchanges with Line 13 at Yufengwei, Line 5 at Dashadong, Line 6 at Luogang and Line 21 and Huangpu Tram Line 1 at Shuixi.

== Stations ==
Station No.	Station name		Connections	Future Connections	Distance km		Location	
Station No.	English	Chinese	Connections	Future Connections	Distance km		Location	
701-8	Meidi Dadao	美的大道			-	0	Shunde	Foshan
701-7	Beijiao Park	北滘公园	3 F313		2.3	2.3	Shunde	Foshan
701-6	Midea	美的			2.2	4.5	Shunde	Foshan
701-5	Nanchong	南涌			1.3	5.8	Shunde	Foshan
701-4	Jinlong	锦龙			2.0	7.8	Shunde	Foshan
701-3	Chencun	陈村	Guangzhao		1.6	9.4	Shunde	Foshan
701-2	Chencunbei	陈村北		11	1.5	10.9	Shunde	Foshan
701-1	Dazhou	大洲			1.5	12.4	Panyu	Guangzhou
701	Guangzhou South Railway Station	广州南站	2 201 22 2203; 2 F227; IZQ Guangzhu GSH; PYA Guangzhao GH ER		1.4	13.8	Panyu	Guangzhou
702	Shibi	石壁	2 202		1.1	14.9	Panyu	Guangzhou
703	Xiecun	谢村			1.9	16.8	Panyu	Guangzhou
704	Zhongcun	钟村			2.2	19.0	Panyu	Guangzhou
705	Hanxi Changlong	汉溪长隆	3 303 GH		1.6	20.6	Panyu	Guangzhou
706	Nancun Wanbo	南村万博	18 1804		2.1	22.7	Panyu	Guangzhou
707	Yuangang	员岗			2.4	25.1	Panyu	Guangzhou
708	Banqiao	板桥			2.4	27.5	Panyu	Guangzhou
709	Higher Education Mega Center South	大学城南	4 418 12 1225		3.8	31.3	Panyu	Guangzhou
710	Shenjing	深井	PL		3.3	34.6	Huangpu	Guangzhou
711	Changzhou	长洲		8	2.3	36.9	Huangpu	Guangzhou
712	Hongshengsha	洪圣沙			1.6	38.5	Huangpu	Guangzhou
713	Yufengwei	裕丰围	13 1325		1.9	40.4	Huangpu	Guangzhou
714	Dashadong	大沙东	5 523		1.5	41.9	Huangpu	Guangzhou
715	Jitang	姬堂			2.9	44.8	Huangpu	Guangzhou
716	Jiazhuang	加庄			1.7	46.5	Huangpu	Guangzhou
717	Kefeng Lu	科丰路			1.9	48.4	Huangpu	Guangzhou
718	Luogang	萝岗	6 631; Civic Square: THP1 THP104		2.7	51.1	Huangpu	Guangzhou
719	Shuixi	水西	21 2110; THP1 THP106		1.3	52.4	Huangpu	Guangzhou
720	Yanshan	燕山			1.0	53.4	Huangpu	Guangzhou

== Rolling stock ==
During initial planning, Line 7 considered the use of 4 car L-type light metro trains for operation. However, severe congestion issues were created after the opening of Line 3, which only uses low capacity 3 car Type B trains and Line 6 which uses even lower capacity 4 car L-shaped trains, prompted heavy public criticism. Planners subsequently reevaluated the passenger flow forecasts for the entire line of Line 7, and upgraded the design to use 6 car B-type trains. Therefore, at the time of construction of Line 7, the partly completed station structures of Line 7 platforms at Guangzhou South Railway Station and Higher Education Mega Center South station were expanded to accommodate the longer trains.

Type B9 trains were equipped with 36.6-inch LCD displays at the end of each car and above each door.

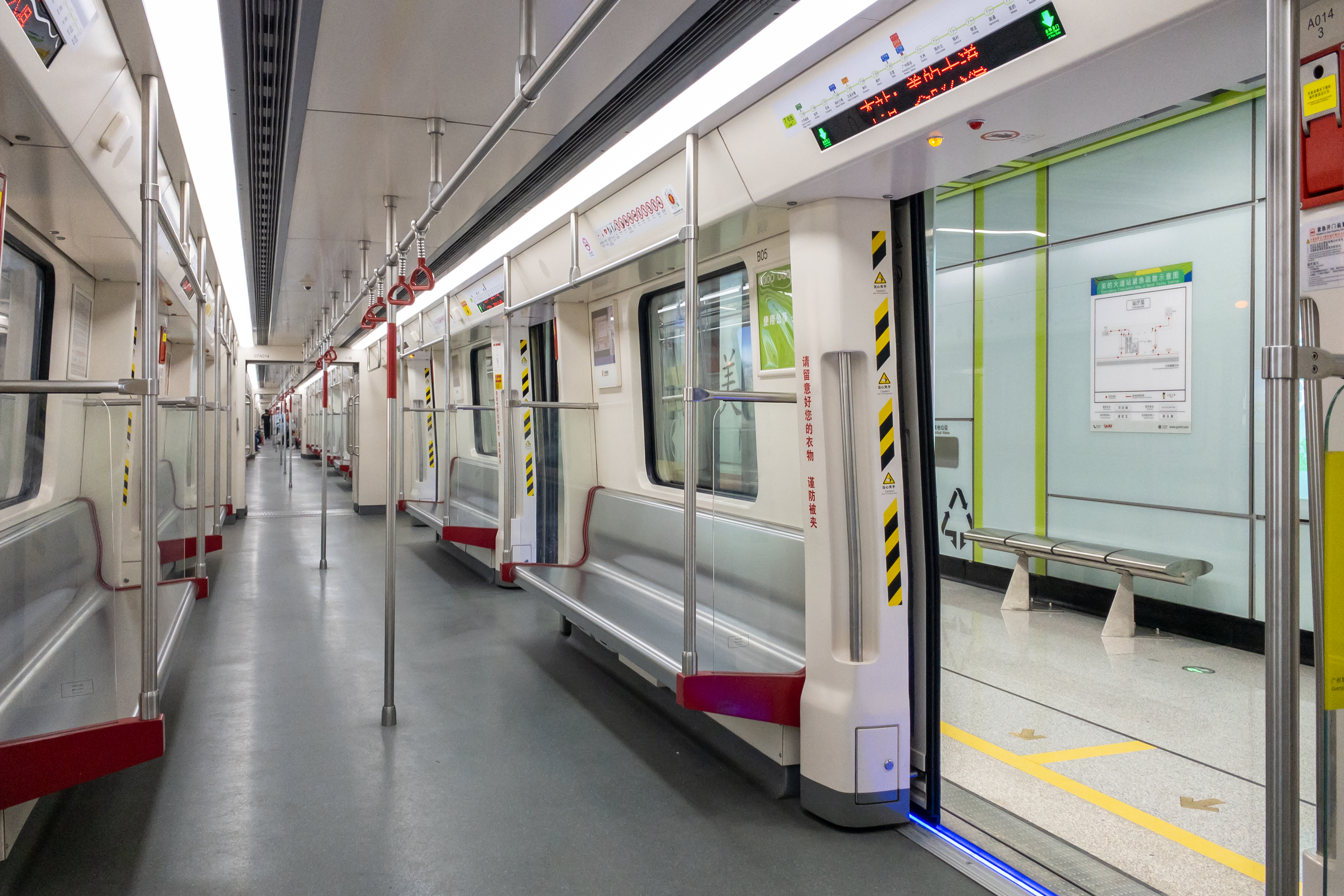
Interior of a B5 series train.

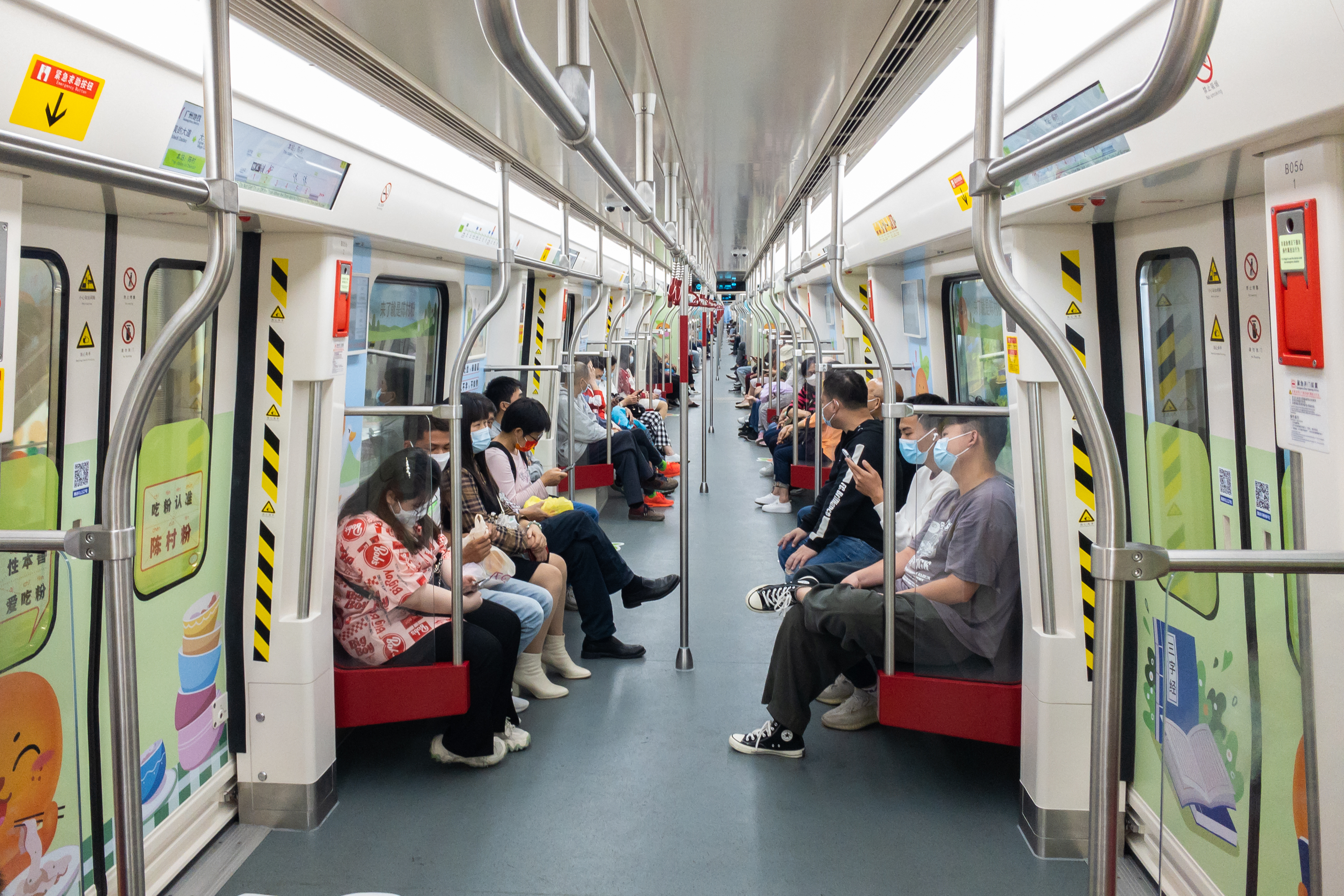
Interior of a B9 series train.

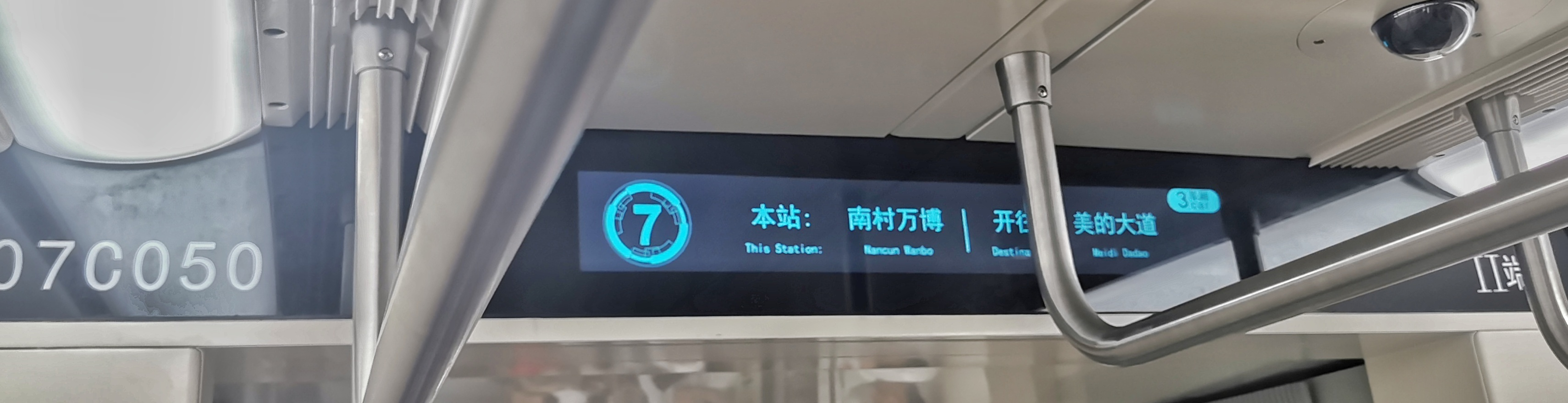
LCD screens on the ends of each B9 series car.

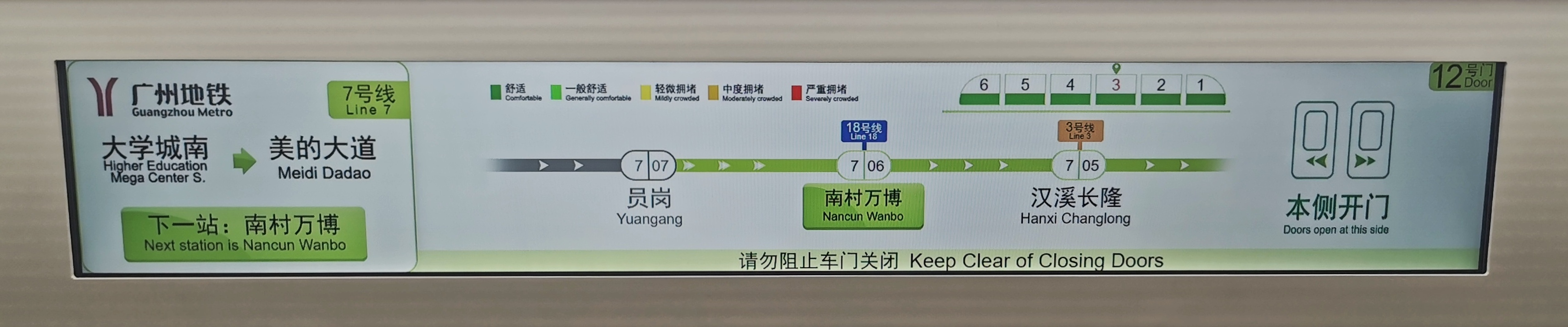
LCD passenger information display over each door of a B9 series train.

Type	Time of manufacturing	Series	Sets	Notes
Type B	2015–2016	B5	23	Manufactured by CRRC Guangzhou for Phase I.
Type B	2021–2022	B9	12	Manufactured by CRRC Qingdao Sifang for the Phase I West Extension.
Type B	2023	B12	19	Manufactured by CRRC Zhuzhou Locomotive for Phase II.
