= Yanshan station (Guangzhou Metro) =

Guangzhou Metro Line 7 terminus station

Yanshan 燕山
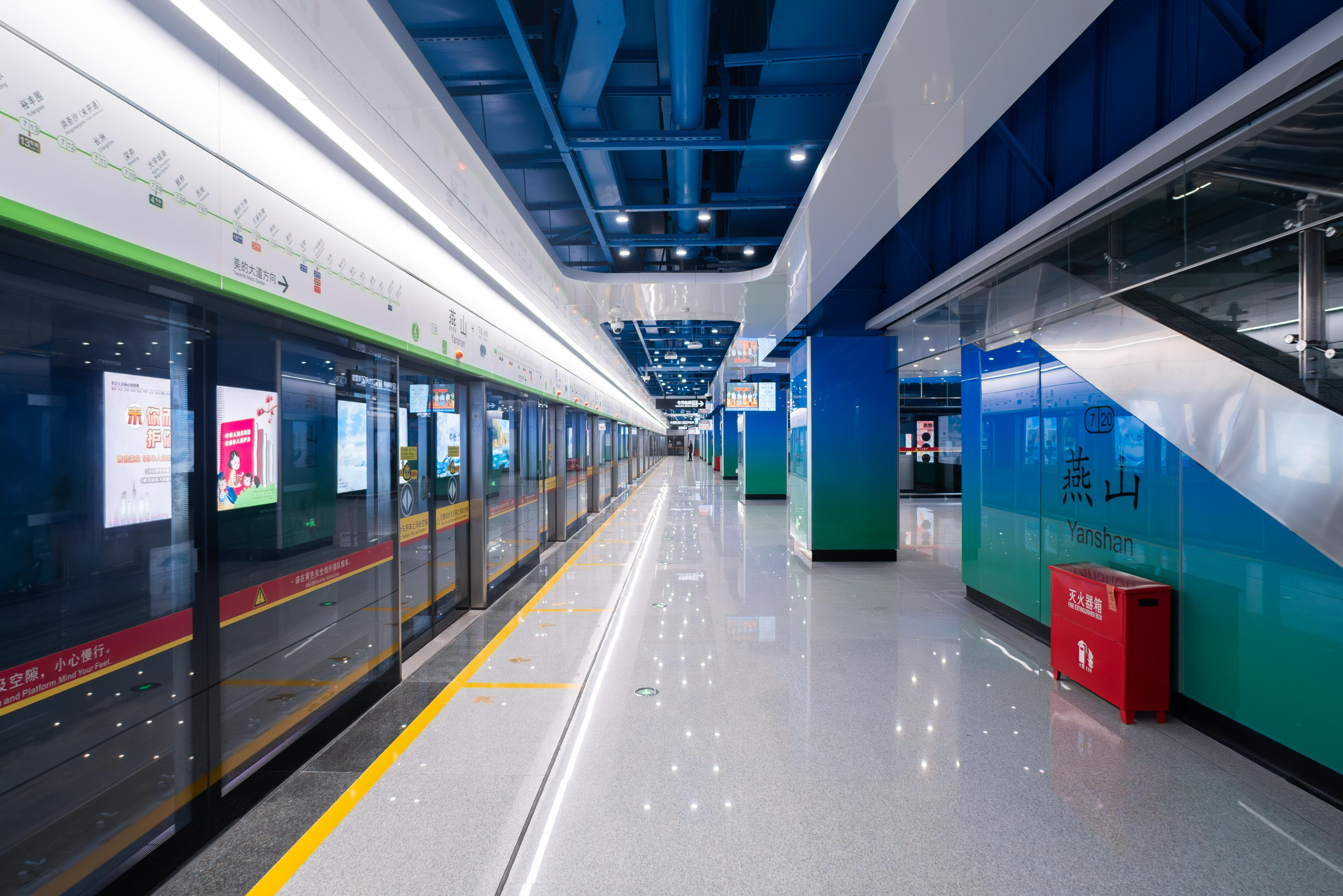
- Originating platform

Chinese name
- Chinese: 燕山站
Transcriptions
Standard Mandarin
- Hanyu Pinyin: Yānshān Zhàn
Yue: Cantonese
- Yale Romanization: Yinsāan Jaahm
- Jyutping: Jin^{3}saan^{1} Zaam^{6}

General information
- Location: South side of Shuixi Stabling Yard, Changling Subdistrict; Huangpu District, Guangzhou, Guangdong; China
- Coordinates: 23°11′51.2574″N 113°28′9.3234″E
- Operator: Guangzhou Metro Co. Ltd.
- Line: Line 7
- Platforms: 2 (2 side platforms)
- Tracks: 2

Construction
- Structure type: Underground
- Accessible: Yes

Other information
- Station code: 720

History
- Opened: 28 December 2023 (2 years ago)
- Former names: Shuixibei (水西北)

Services
Preceding station	Guangzhou Metro	Following station
Shuixi towards Meidi Dadao	Line 7	Terminus
Location

Yanshan Station (Chinese: 燕山站; pinyin: Yānshān Zhàn; Cantonese Yale: Yinsāan Jaahm) is a station of Guangzhou Metro Line 7, located underground at the south side of Shuixi Stabling Yard in Guangzhou's Huangpu District. It opened on 28 December 2023, with the opening of Phase 2 of Line 7, and is the northeastern terminus of the line.

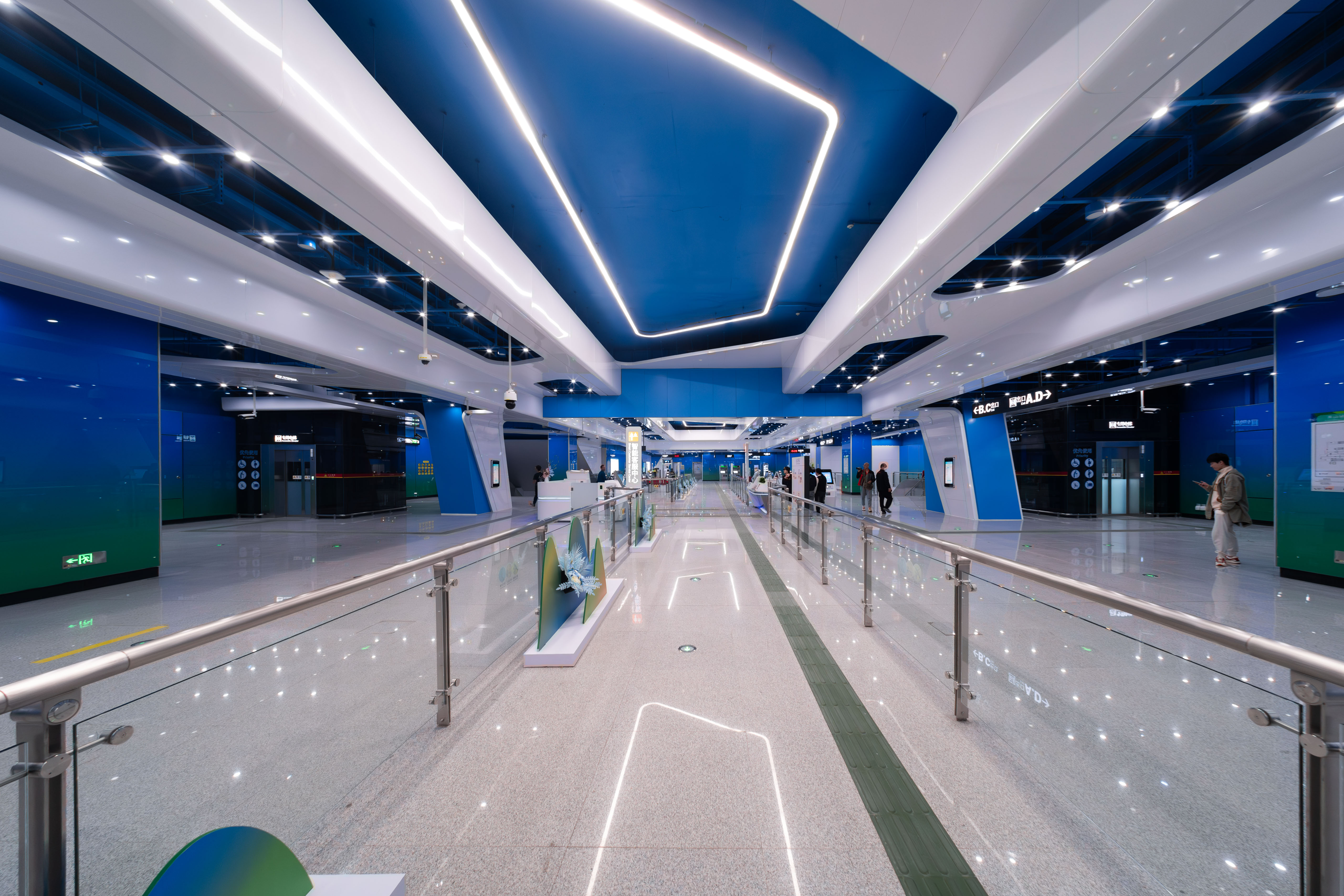
Concourse

== Station layout ==
G	Street level	Exits A-D
L1; Concourse	Lobby	Ticket Machines, Customer Service, Shops, Police Station, Security Facilities
L2; Platforms	Side platform, doors will open on the right for boarding passengers only (Toilets, Nursery)
L2; Platforms	Platform 2	7 towards Meidi Dadao (Shuixi)
L2; Platforms	Platform 1	7 termination platform
L2; Platforms	Side platform, doors will open on the right for alighting passengers only (Toilets, Nursery)

=== Entrances/exits ===
The station has 4 points of entry/exit. Exit A is equipped with an elevator.

- A: Luoxinheng Street
- B: Luoxinheng Street
- C: Luoxinheng Street
- D: Luoxinheng Street
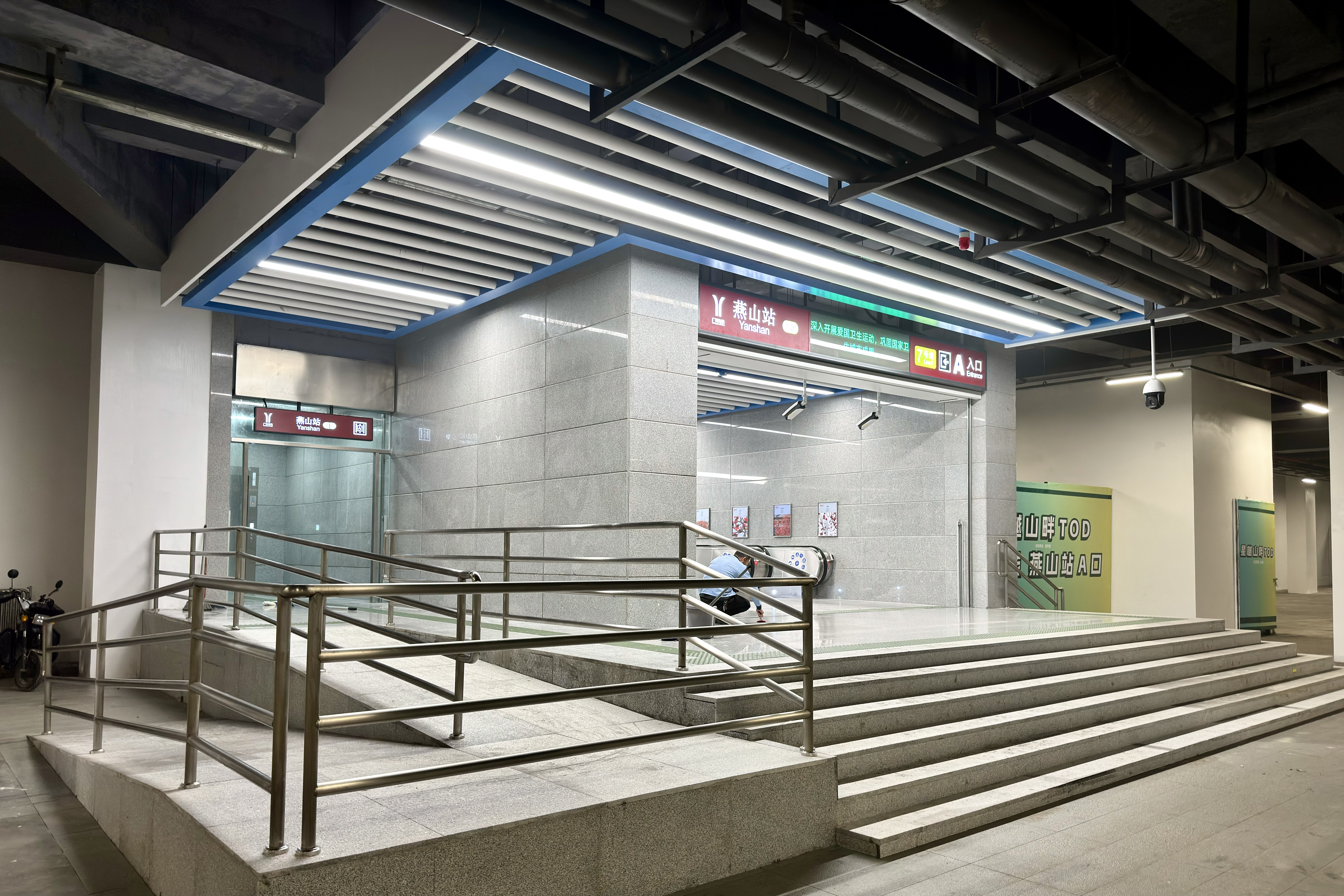
Entrance A

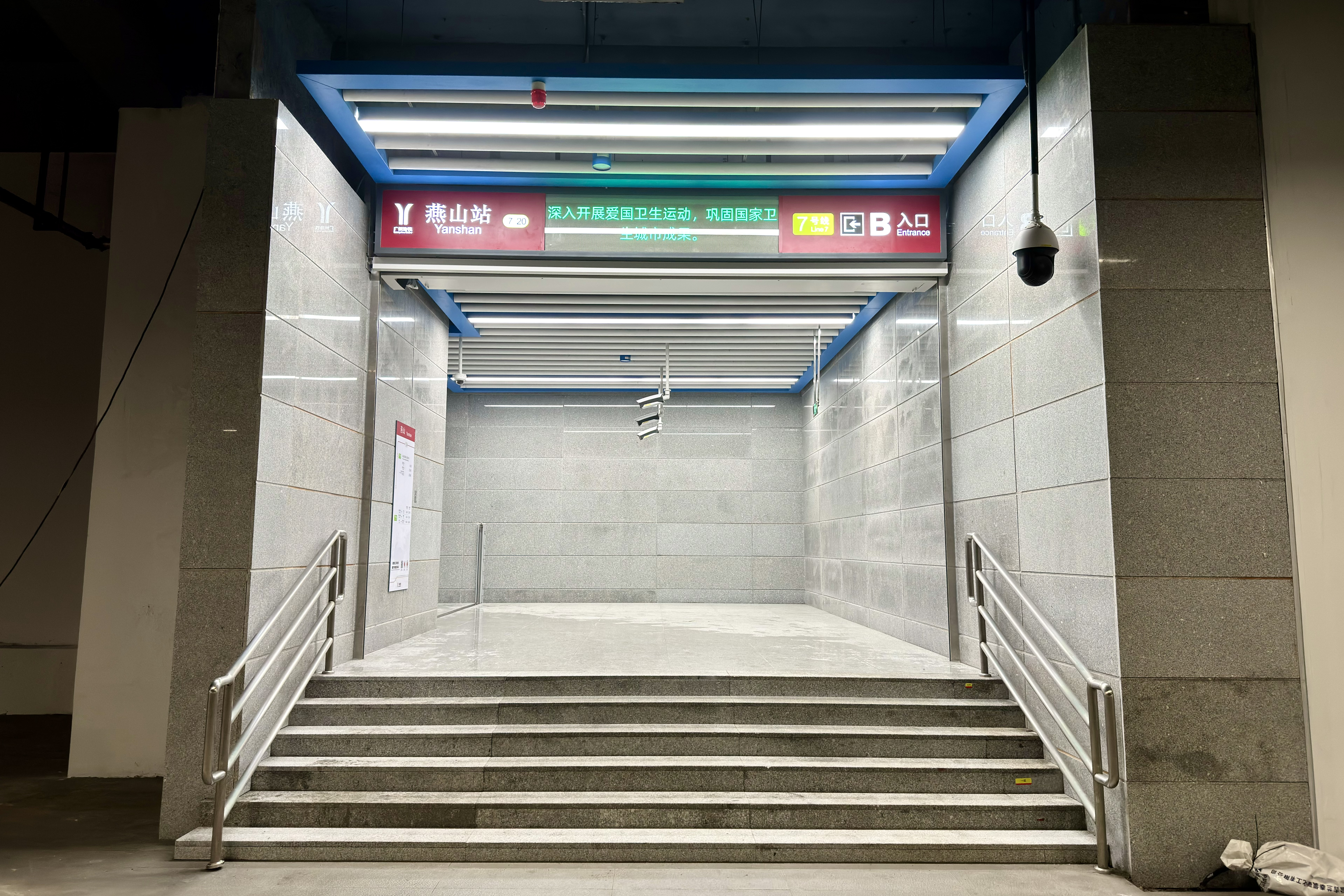
Entrance B

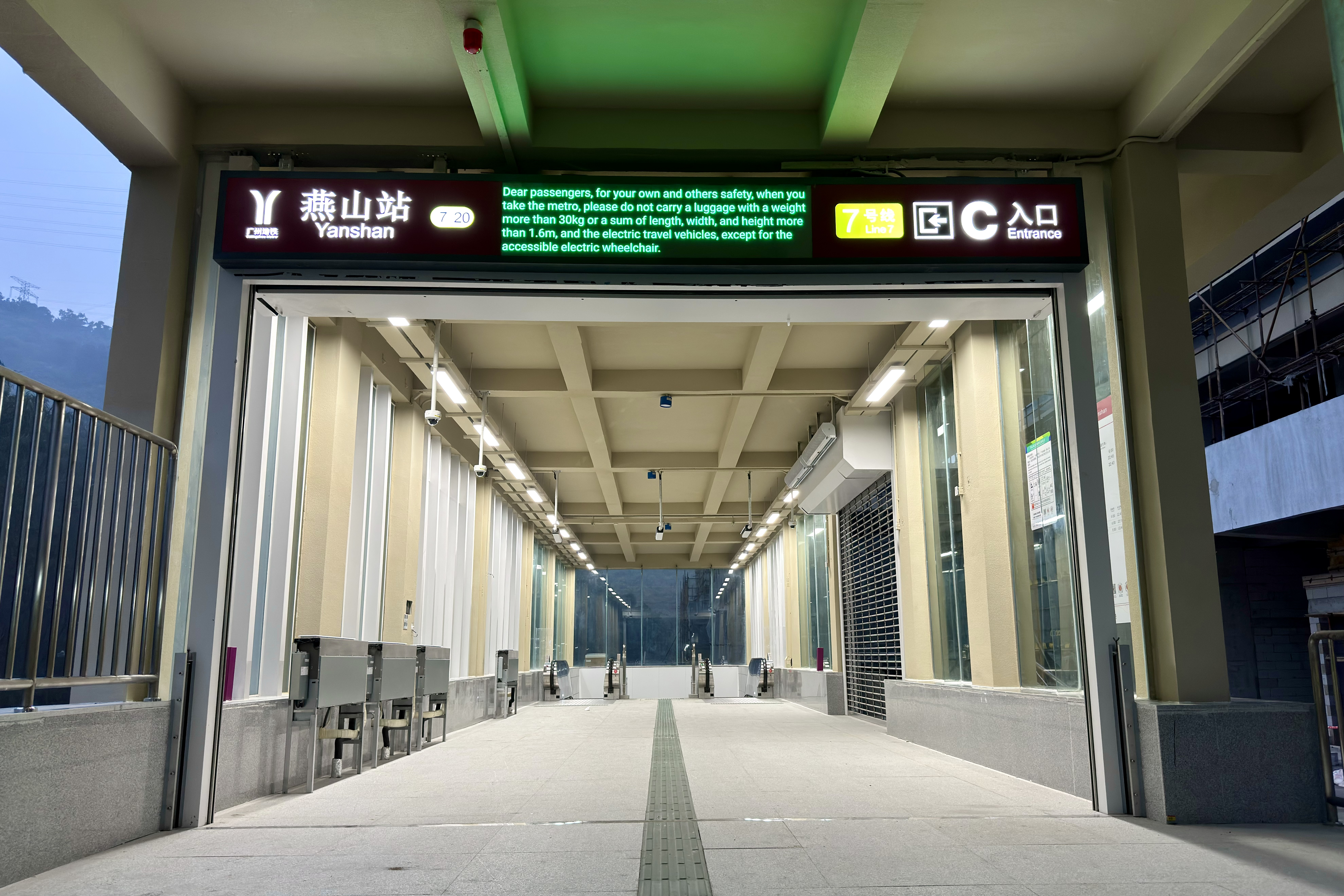
Entrance C

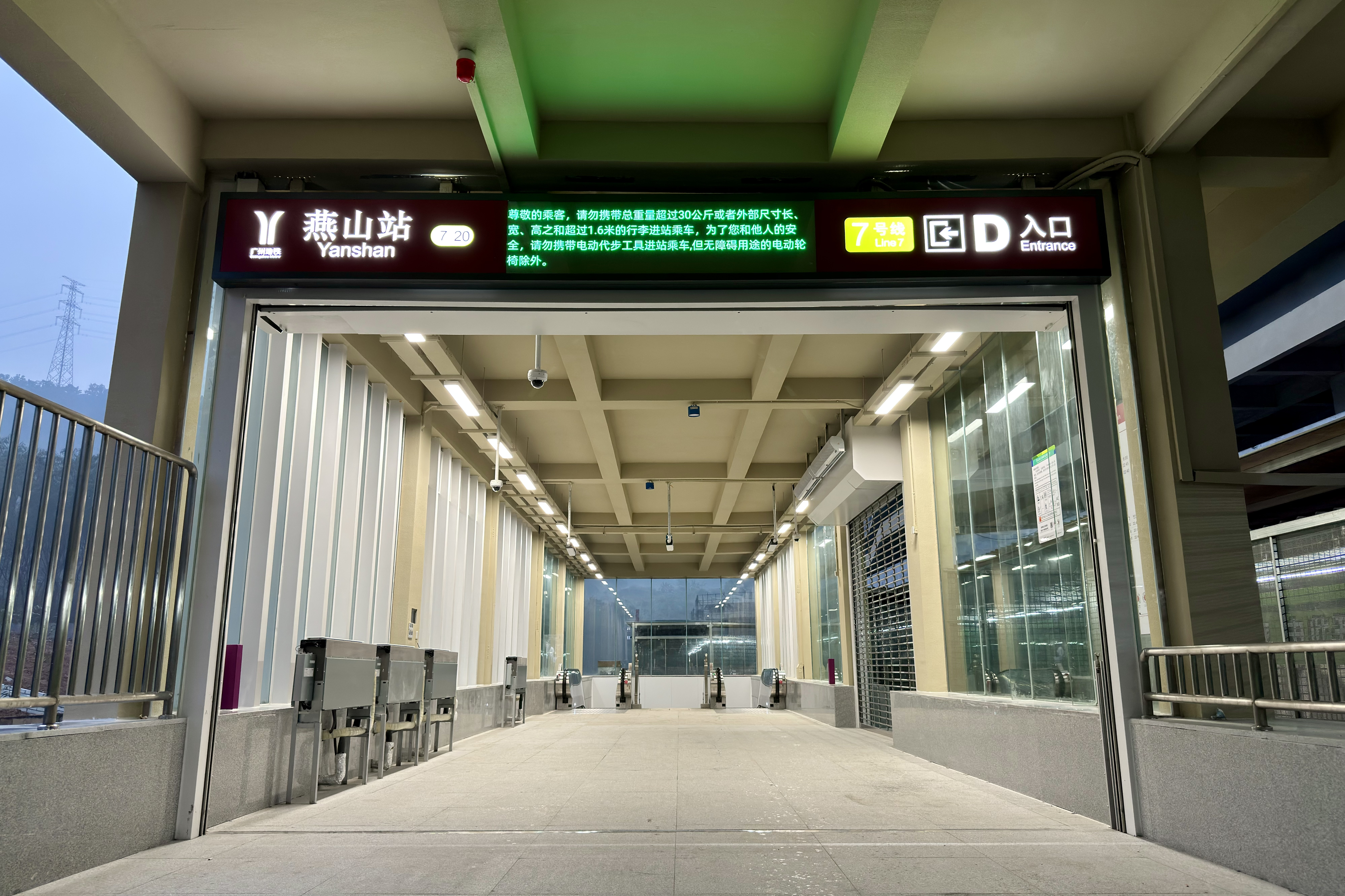
Entrance D

== History ==
In the initial planning of Phase 2 of Line 7, this station was not part of the plan. In order to develop the superstructure of the Shuixi Stabling Yard, the line was extended to Shuixibei Station, which was eventually implemented. In December 2021, the main structure of the site topped out.

This station was called Shuixibei station when it was planned and constructed. On 27 February 2023, the Guangzhou Civil Affairs Bureau announced the initial naming of the second phase of Line 7. Because the station was the location of Yanshan Village before the start of construction, it was renamed to Yanshan station in accordance with Article 5 (1) of the "Guangzhou Metro Station Naming Rules".

The station completed the "three rights" transfer in November 2023. At 12:00 on December 28, the station was put into use with the opening of Line 7 Phase 2.
