= Meidi Dadao station =

Guangzhou Metro Line 7 terminus station

Meidi Dadao 美的大道
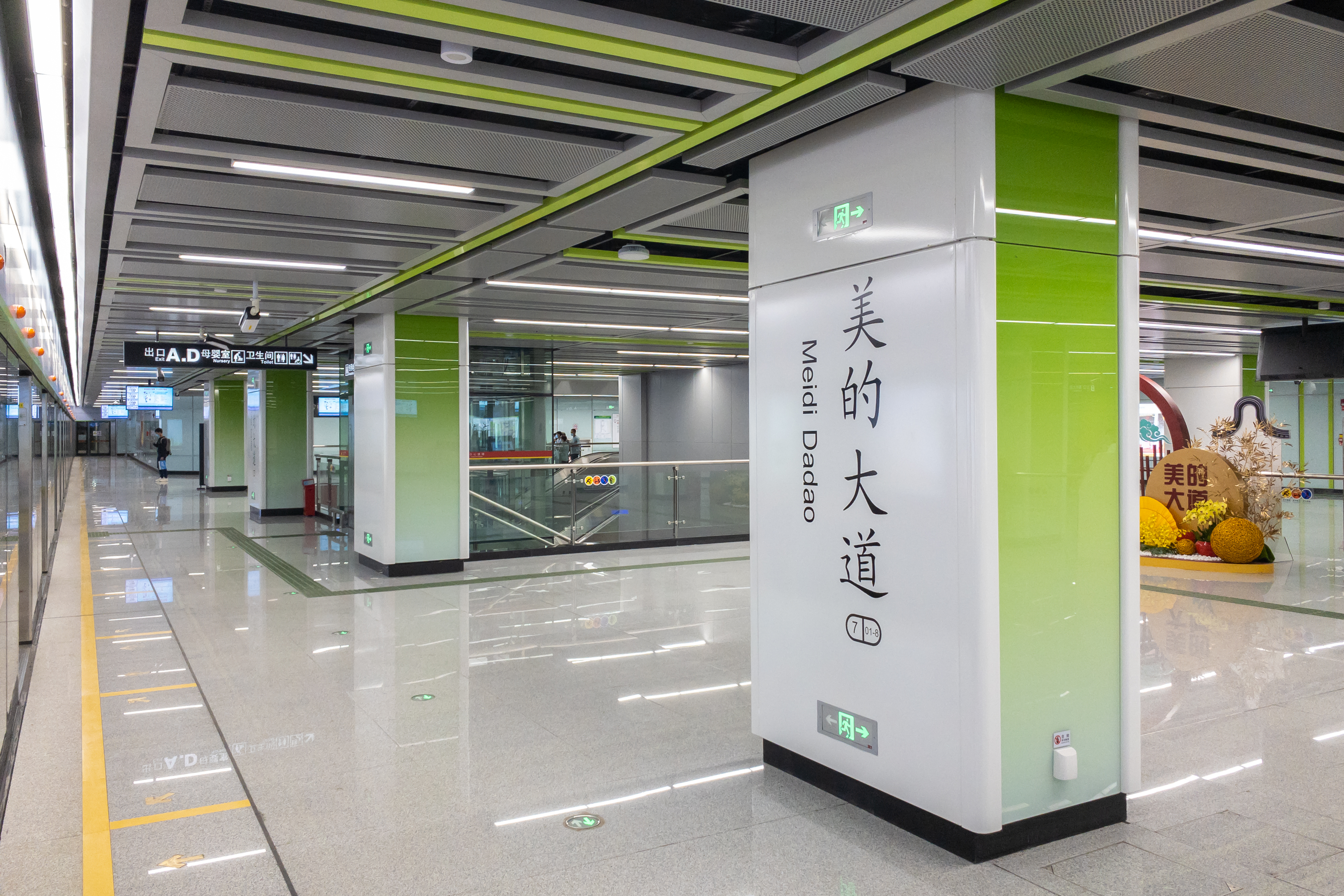
- Platform 1 (originating platform)

Chinese name
- Chinese: 美的大道站
Transcriptions
Standard Mandarin
- Hanyu Pinyin: Měidì Dàdào Zhàn
Yue: Cantonese
- Yale Romanization: Méihdīk Daaihdouh Jaahm
- Jyutping: mei^{5}dik^{1} daai^{6}dou^{6} zaam^{6}

General information
- Location: Intersection of Yifeng Road (益丰路) and Midea Avenue (美的大道), Beijiao Subdistrict, Shunde District, Foshan, Guangdong; China
- Coordinates: 22°56′51.47″N 113°12′8.60″E
- Operator: Guangzhou Metro Group
- Line: Line 7
- Platforms: 2 (2 side platforms)
- Tracks: 2

Construction
- Structure type: Underground
- Accessible: Yes

Other information
- Station code: 701-8

History
- Opened: 1 May 2022 (4 years ago)

Services
Preceding station	Guangzhou Metro	Following station
Terminus	Line 7	Beijiao Park towards Yanshan
Location

Meidi Dadao Station (Chinese: 美的大道站; pinyin: Měidì Dàdào Zhàn; lit. 'Midea Avenue Station') is a station on Line 7 of Guangzhou Metro, located underground on the intersection of Yifeng Road and Midea Avenue in Foshan's Shunde District. The station was opened on 1 May 2022, with the opening of the western extension of Line 7, and is the southwestern terminus of the line.

The rails for the station connect to the nearby Yifeng Stabling Yard.

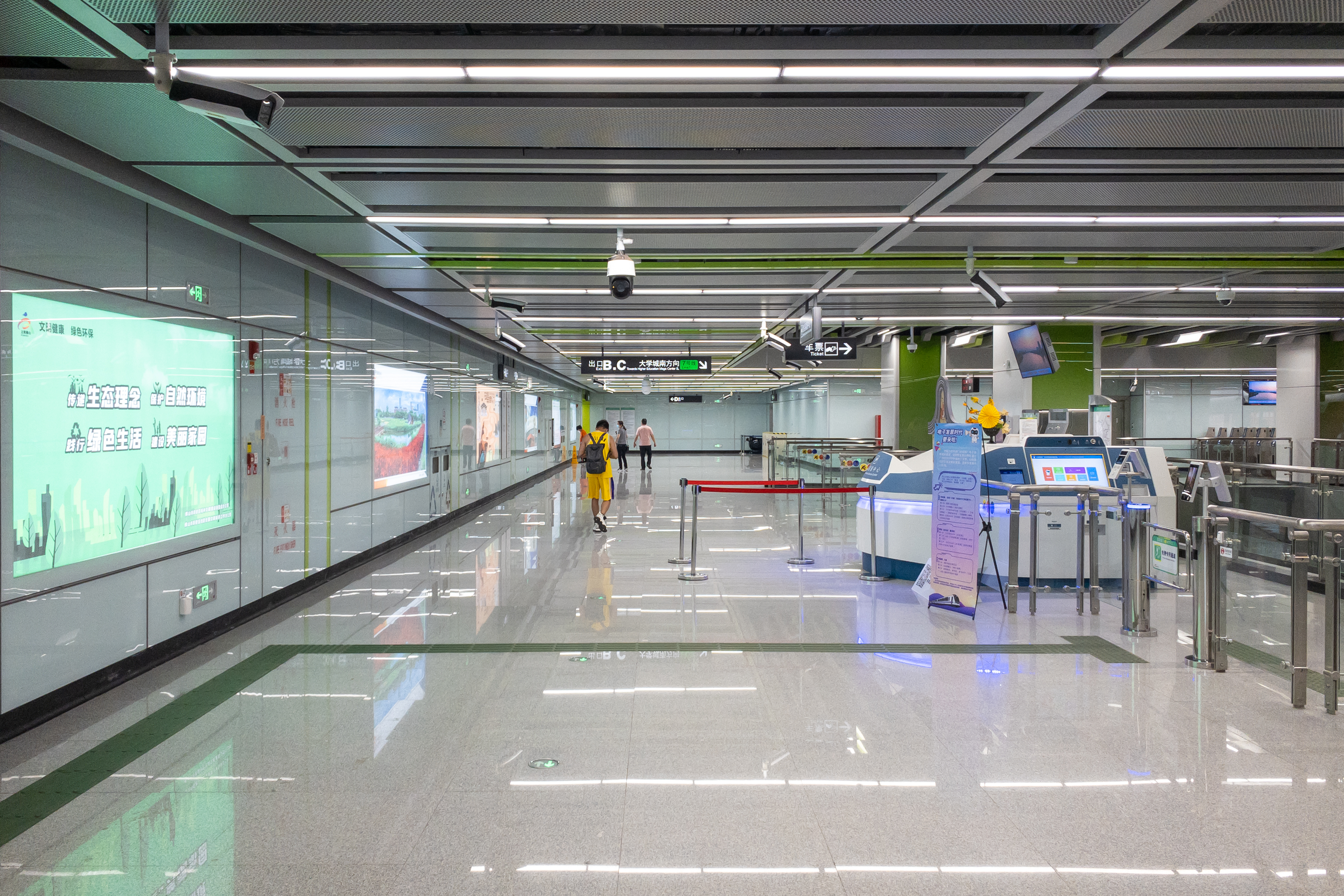
East concourse

== Station layout ==
G	Street level	Exits A, B, C, D
L1; Concourse & Platforms	North Lobby	Ticket Machines, Customer Service, Police Station, Security Facilities
L1; Concourse & Platforms	Side platform, doors will open on the right for alighting passengers only (Toilets, Nursery)
L1; Concourse & Platforms	Platform 2	7 termination platform
L1; Concourse & Platforms	Platform 1	7 towards Yanshan (Beijiao Park)
L1; Concourse & Platforms	Side platform, doors will open on the right for boarding passengers only (Toilets, Nursery)
L1; Concourse & Platforms	South Lobby	Ticket Machines, Customer Service, Police Station, Security Facilities
L2; Mezzanine	Connecting passageways	Non-paid connecting passage between both sides of the concourses, paid connecting passage between both sides of the platforms

=== Entrances/exits ===
Meidi Dadao has 4 points of entry/exit, split between Exits A and D located at the west concourse and Exits B and C located at the east concourse. Exit C is equipped with an elevator.

- A: Meidi Avenue
- B: Meidi Avenue
- C: Meidi Avenue
- D: Meidi Avenue
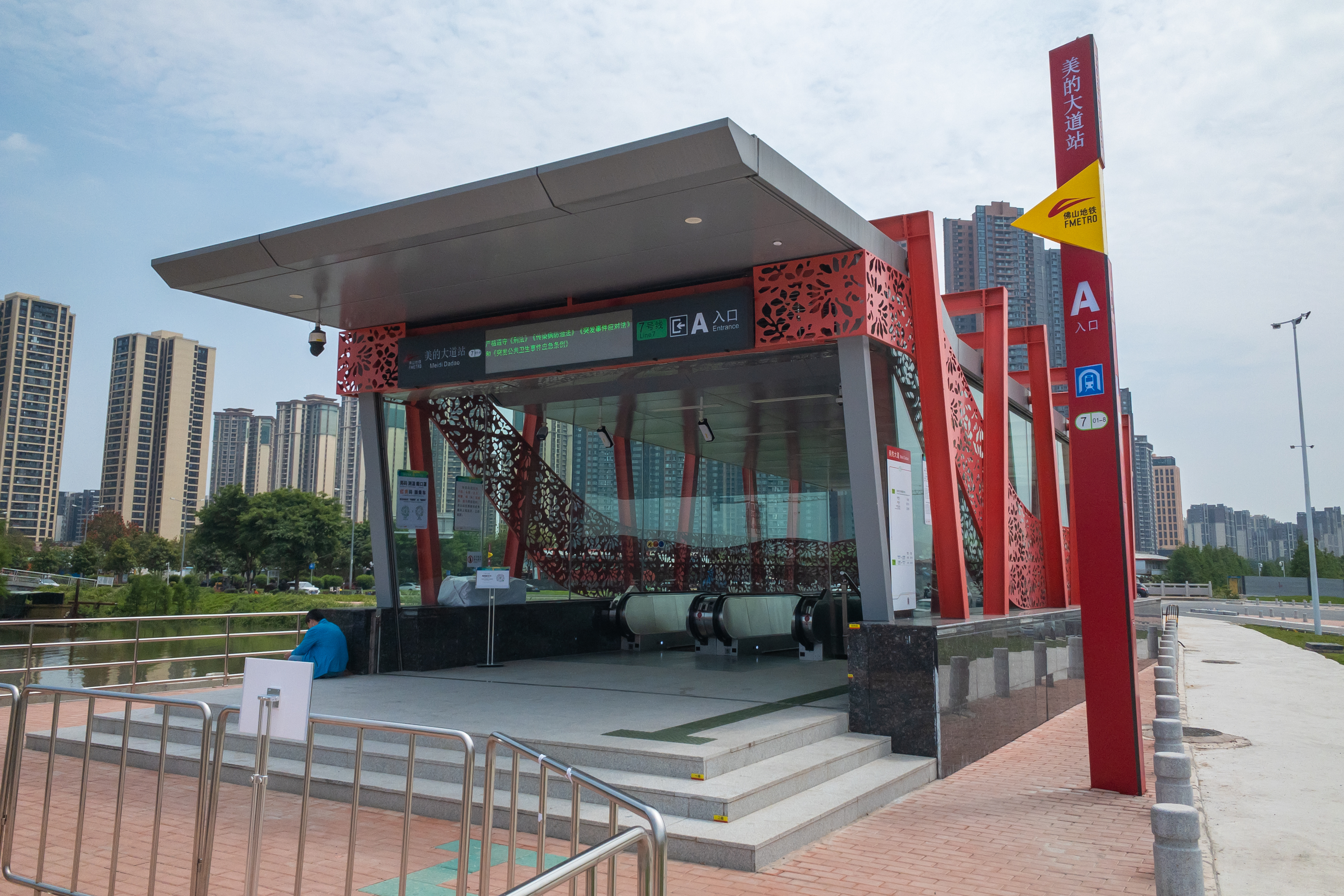
Entrance A

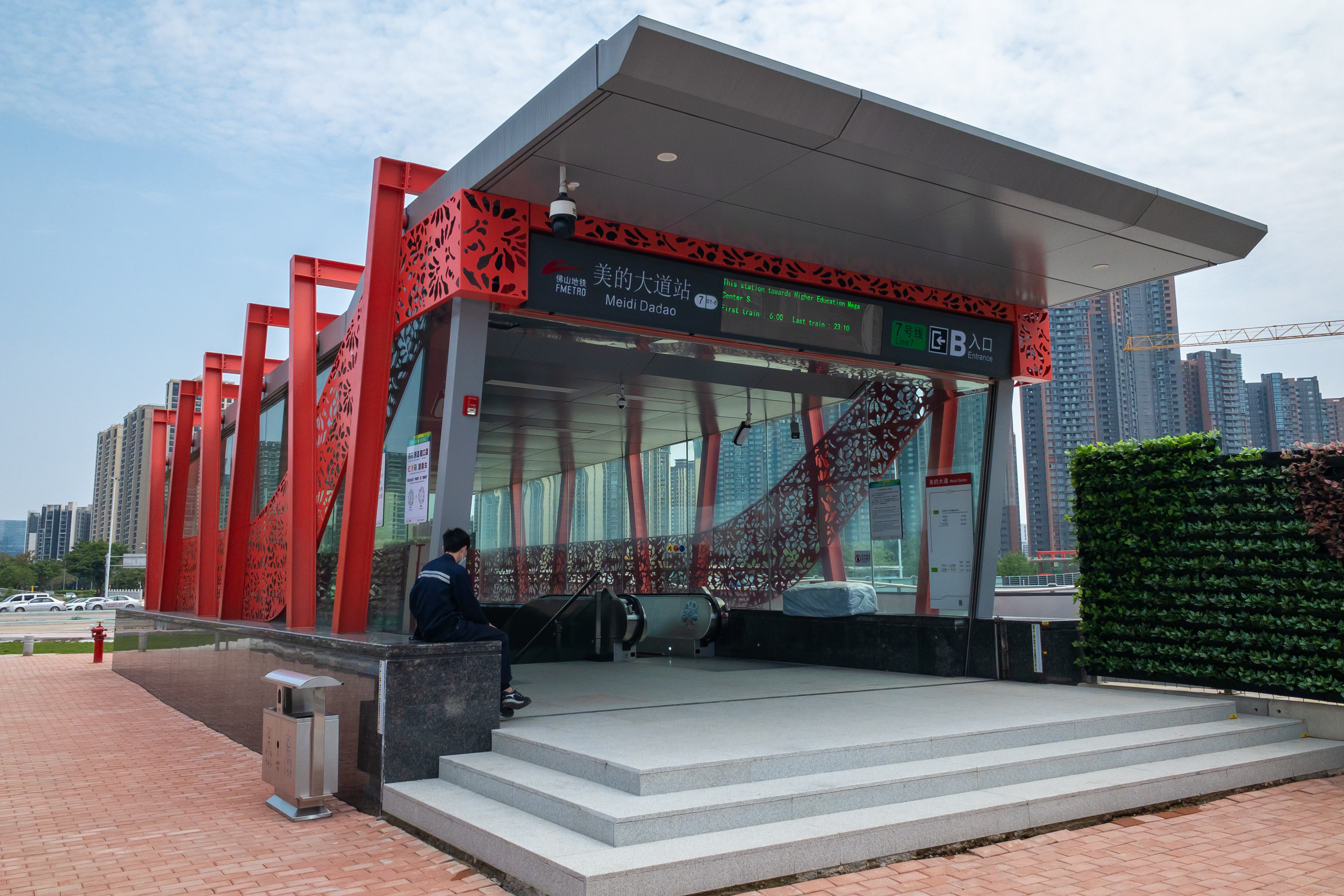
Entrance B

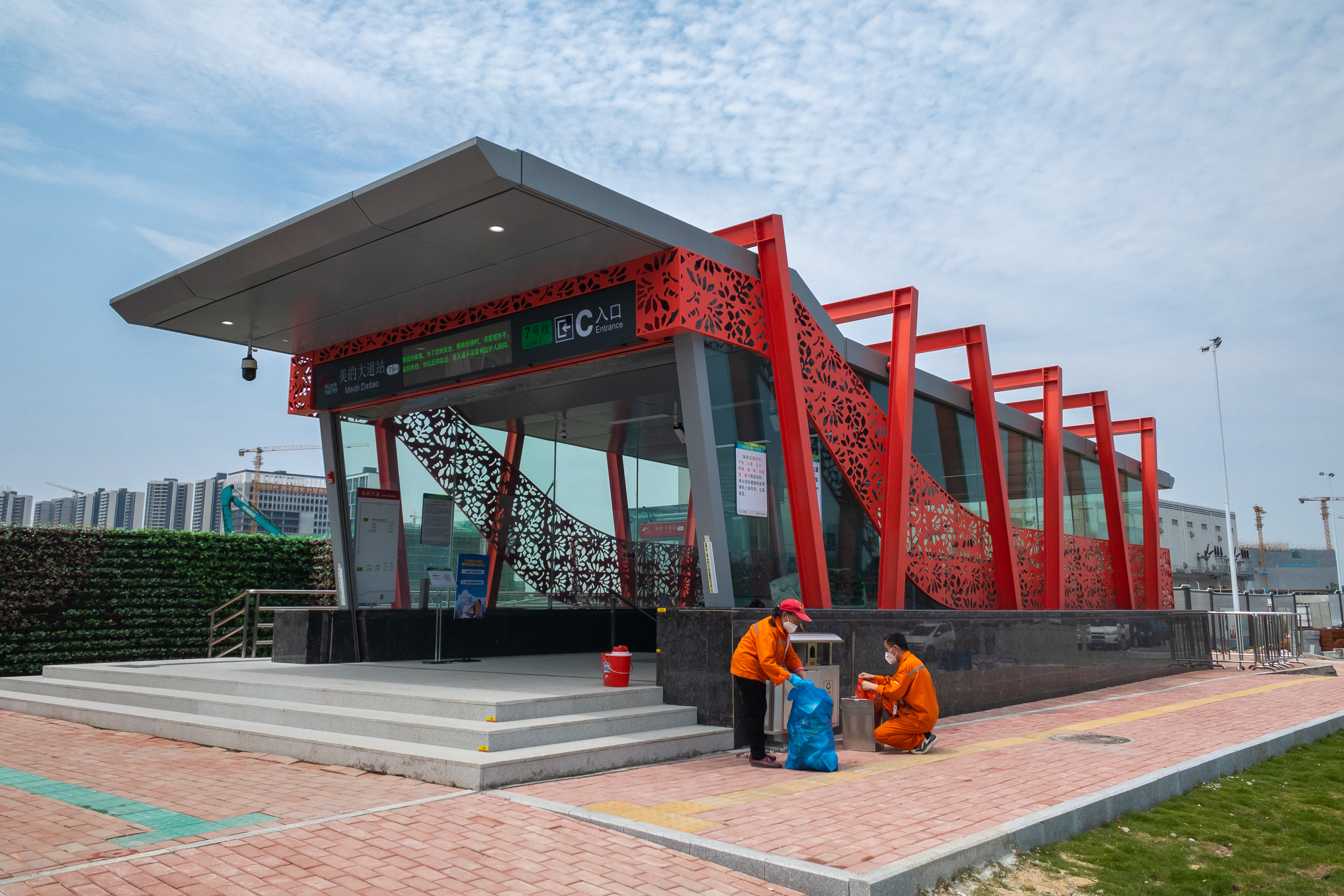
Entrance C

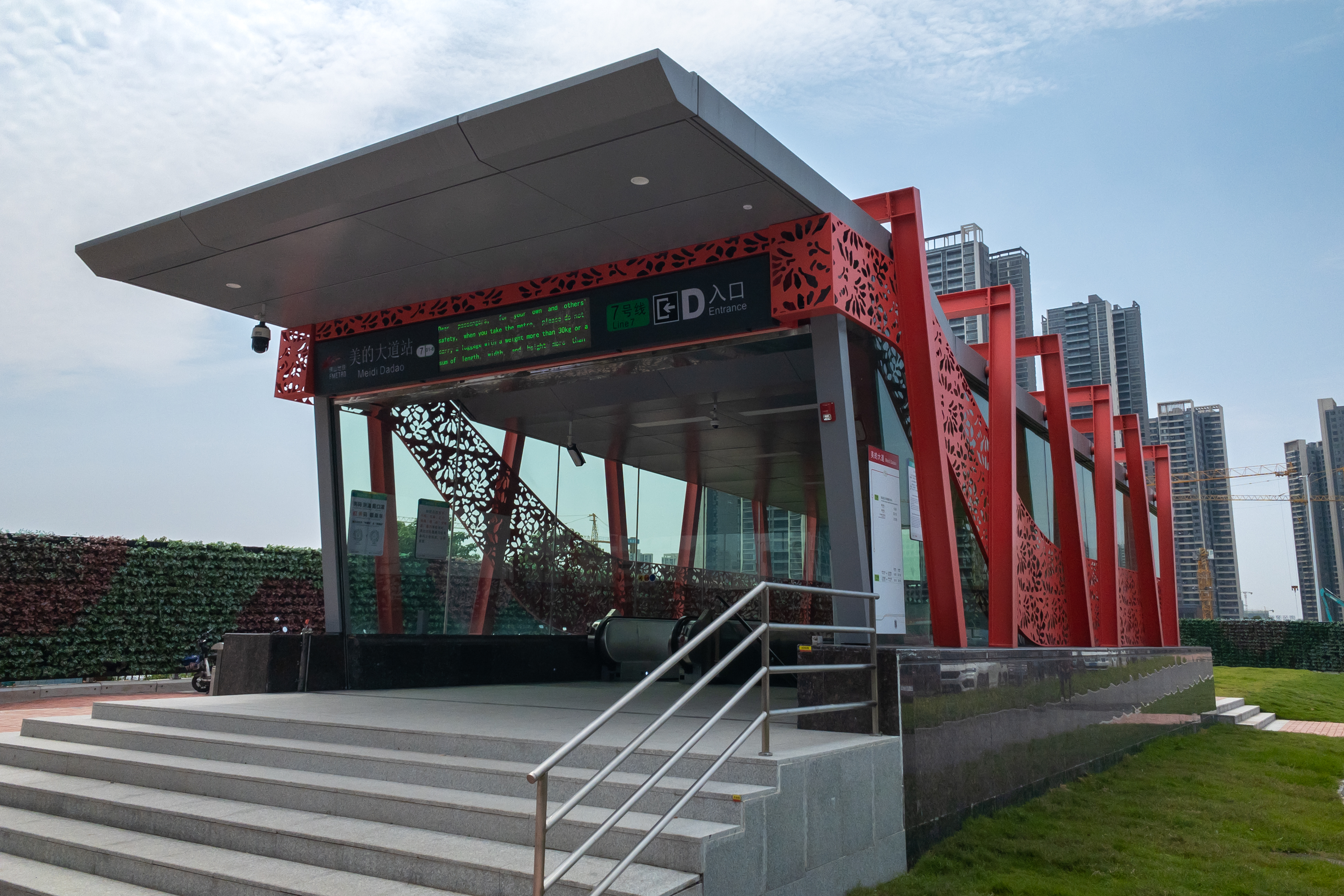
Entrance D

== History ==
During early planning, the planned terminus of Guangzhou Metro Line 7 westward to Beijiao in Shunde was originally planned to be located at Beijiao New Town station (now Beijiao Park), where it intersected with Foshan Metro Line 3. However, in later planning, it was determined that a stabling yard would be added to the western extension, and this station would be added at the same time, so this station became the official western terminus of Guangzhou Metro Line 7.

The station site began enclosure construction on 22 May 2017. On 10 January 2020, the main structure topped out. The station completed the "three rights" transfer on 21 October 2021, making it one of the first stations on the western extension of the line to do so.

It opened on 1 May 2022 with the western extension of Line 7.

During COVID-19 pandemic control rules at the end of 2022, due to the impact of prevention and control measures, station service was suspended from 28 to the afternoon of 30 November 2022.
