= Jitang station =

Guangzhou Metro Line 7 station

Jitang 姬堂
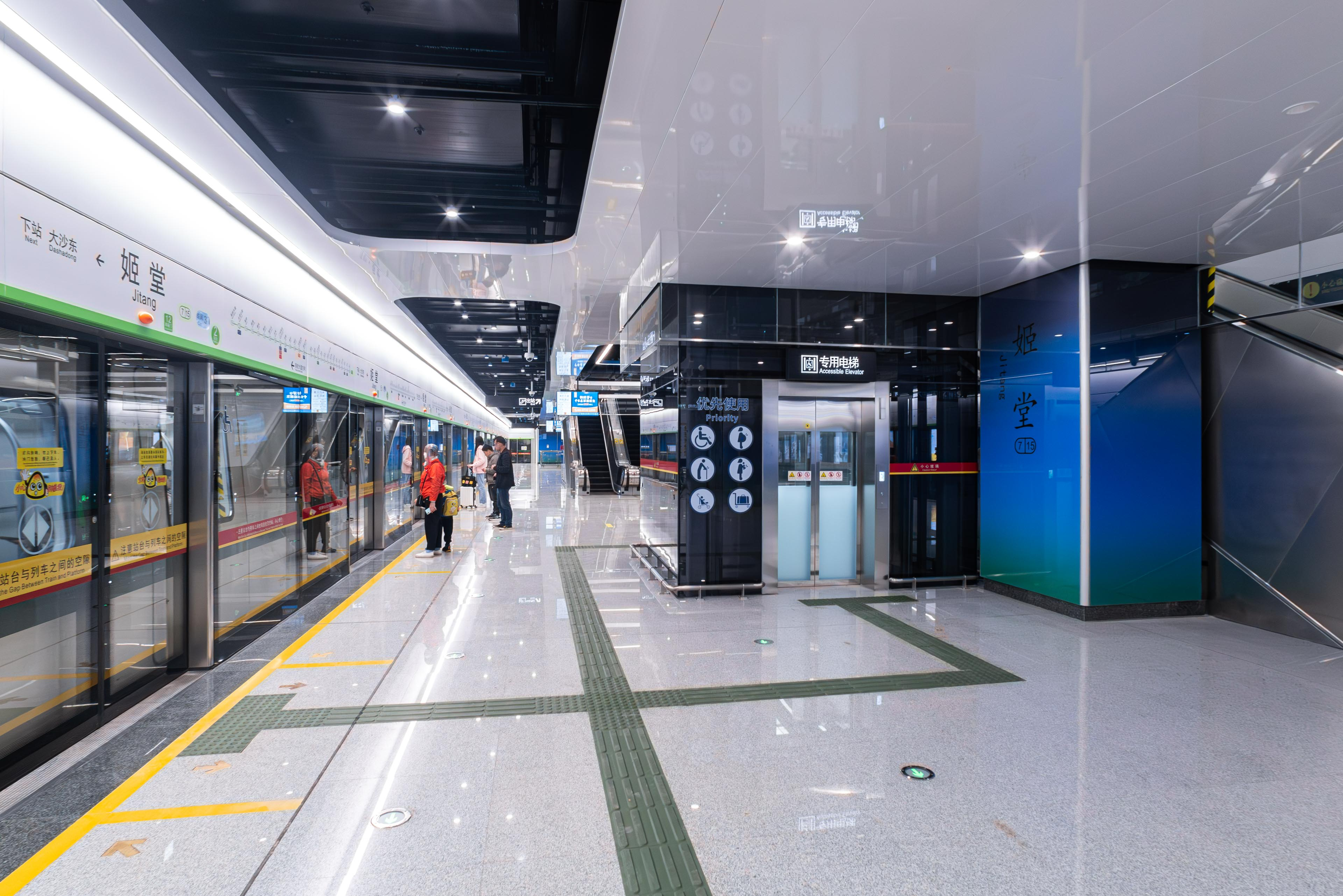
- Platform

Chinese name
- Chinese: 姬堂站
Transcriptions
Standard Mandarin
- Hanyu Pinyin: Jītáng Zhàn
Yue: Cantonese
- Yale Romanization: Gēitòng Jaahm
- Jyutping: Gei^{1}tong^{4} Zaam^{6}

General information
- Location: Fork of Fengle North Road (丰乐北路), Jitang Changqing Street (姬堂长庚街) and Changsheng Street (长盛街), Dasha Subdistrict; Huangpu District, Guangzhou, Guangdong; China
- Coordinates: 23°8′4.49″N 113°27′2.05″E
- Operator: Guangzhou Metro Co. Ltd.
- Line: Line 7
- Platforms: 2 (1 island platform)
- Tracks: 2

Construction
- Structure type: Underground
- Accessible: Yes

Other information
- Station code: 715

History
- Opened: 28 December 2023 (2 years ago)

Services
Preceding station	Guangzhou Metro	Following station
Dashadong towards Meidi Dadao	Line 7	Jiazhuang towards Yanshan
Location

Jitang Station (Chinese: 姬堂站; pinyin: Jītáng Zhàn; Cantonese Yale: Gēitòng Jaahm) is a station of Guangzhou Metro Line 7, located underground at the fork of Fengle North Road, Jitang Changqing Street and Changsheng Street in Guangzhou's Huangpu District. It opened on 28 December 2023, with the opening of Phase 2 of Line 7.

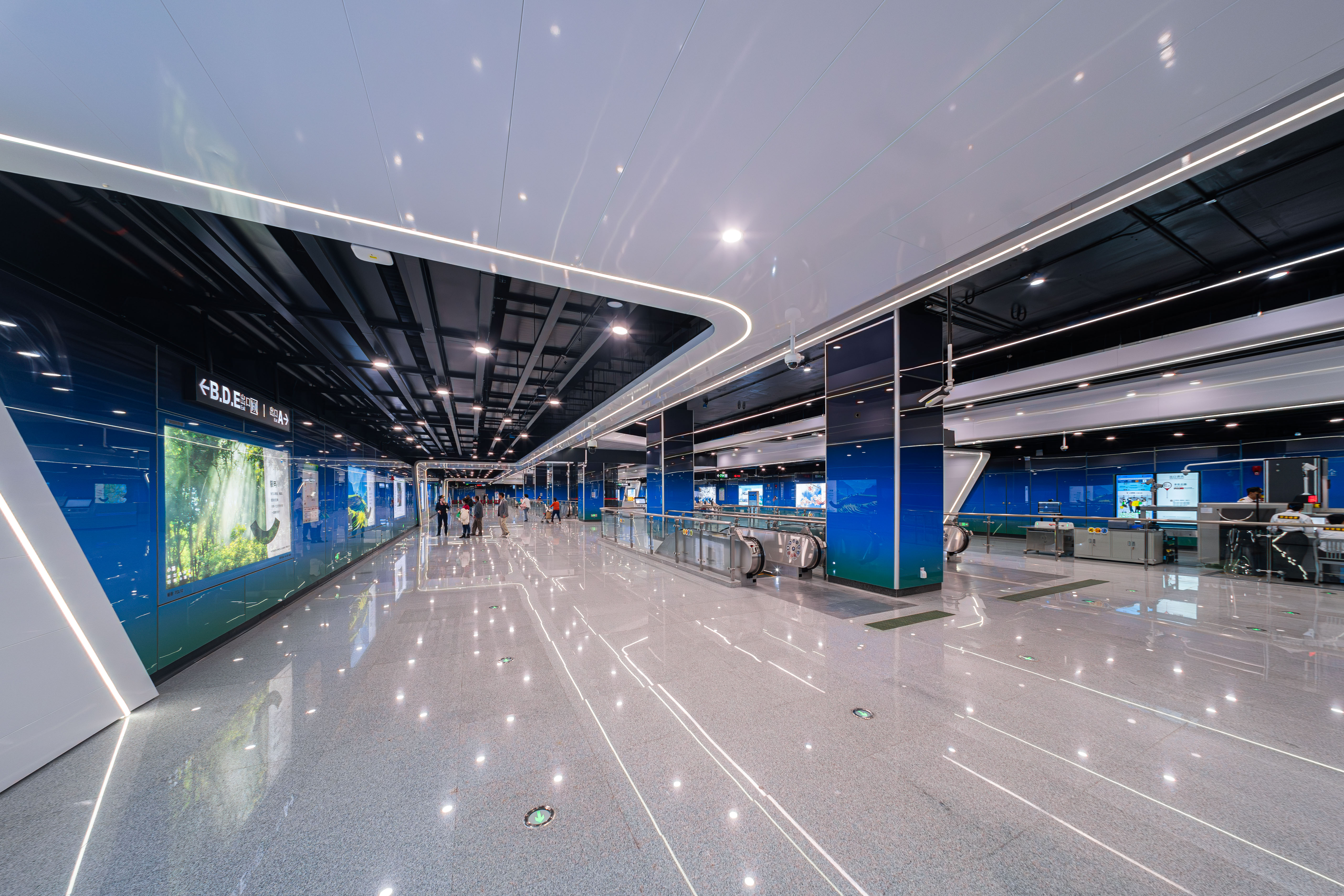
Concourse

== Station layout ==
G	Street level	Exits A, B, D, E
L1; Concourse	Lobby	Ticket Machines, Customer Service, Shops, Police Station, Security Facilities
L2; Platforms	Platform 2	7 towards Meidi Dadao (Dashadong)
L2; Platforms	Island platform, doors will open on the left (Toilets, Nursery)
L2; Platforms	Platform 1	7 towards Yanshan (Jiazhuang)

=== Entrances/exits ===
The station has 4 points of entry/exit. Exit E is equipped with an elevator.

- A: Fengle North Road
- B: Fengle North Road
- D: Fengle North Road
- E: Fengle North Road
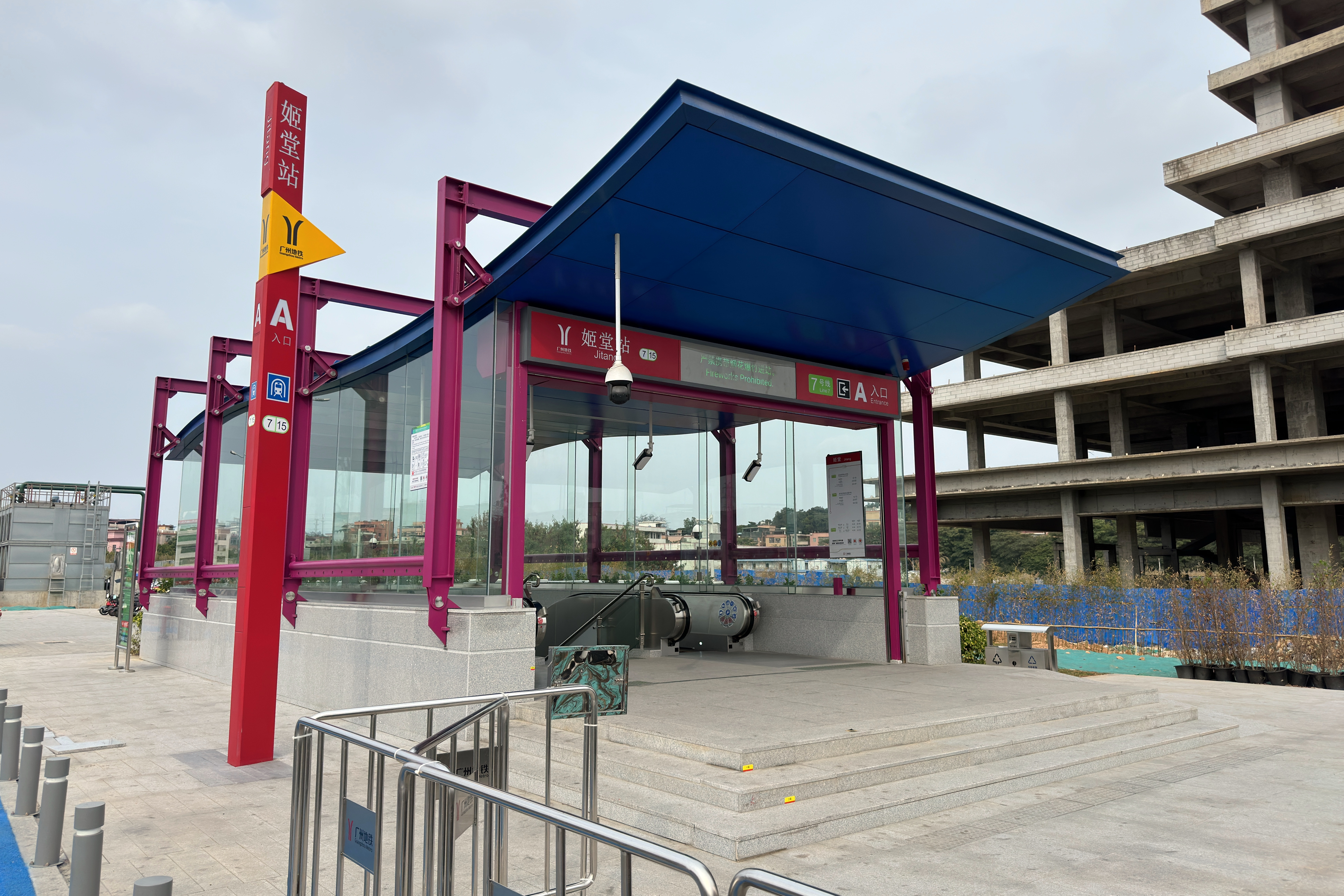
Entrance A

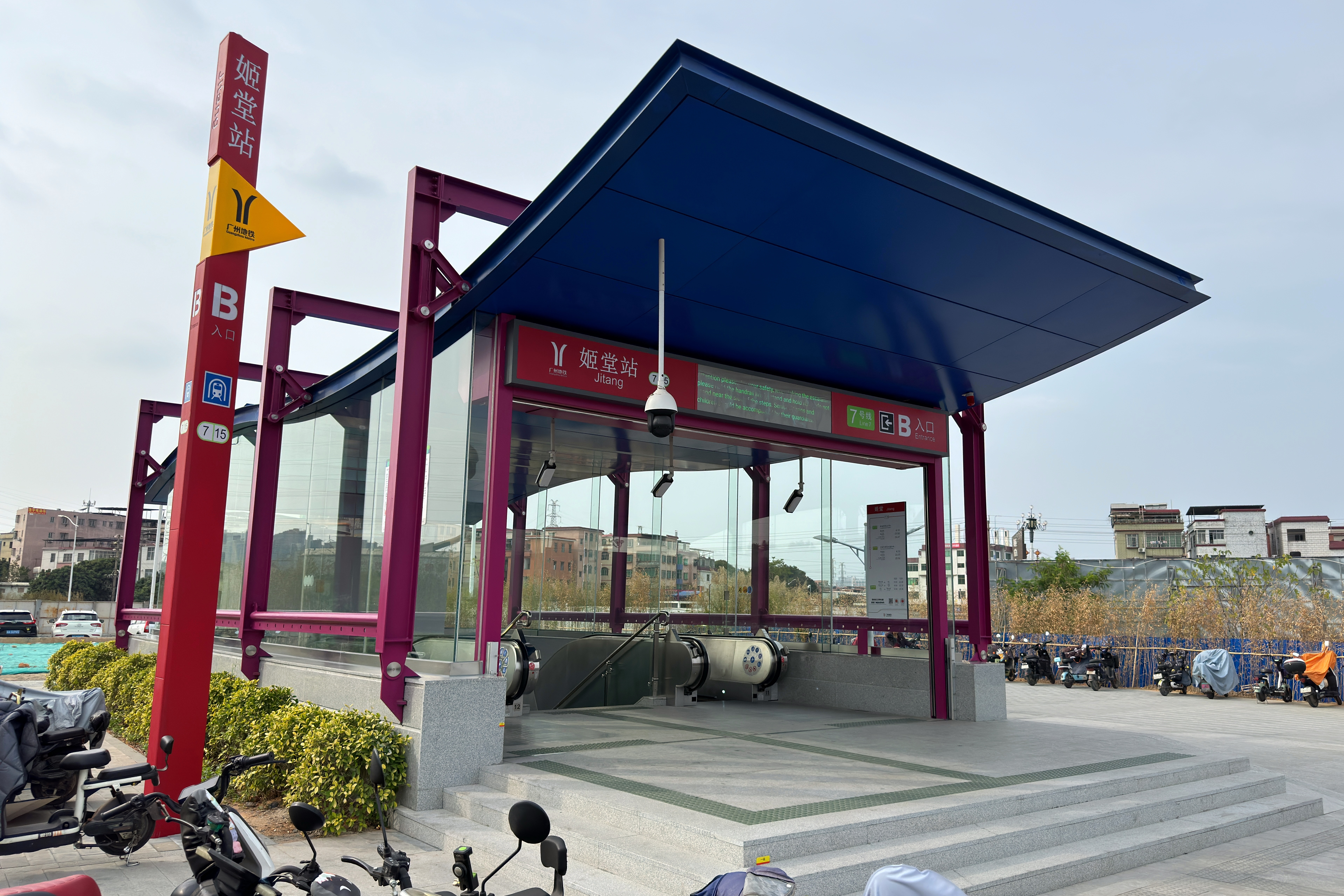
Entrance B

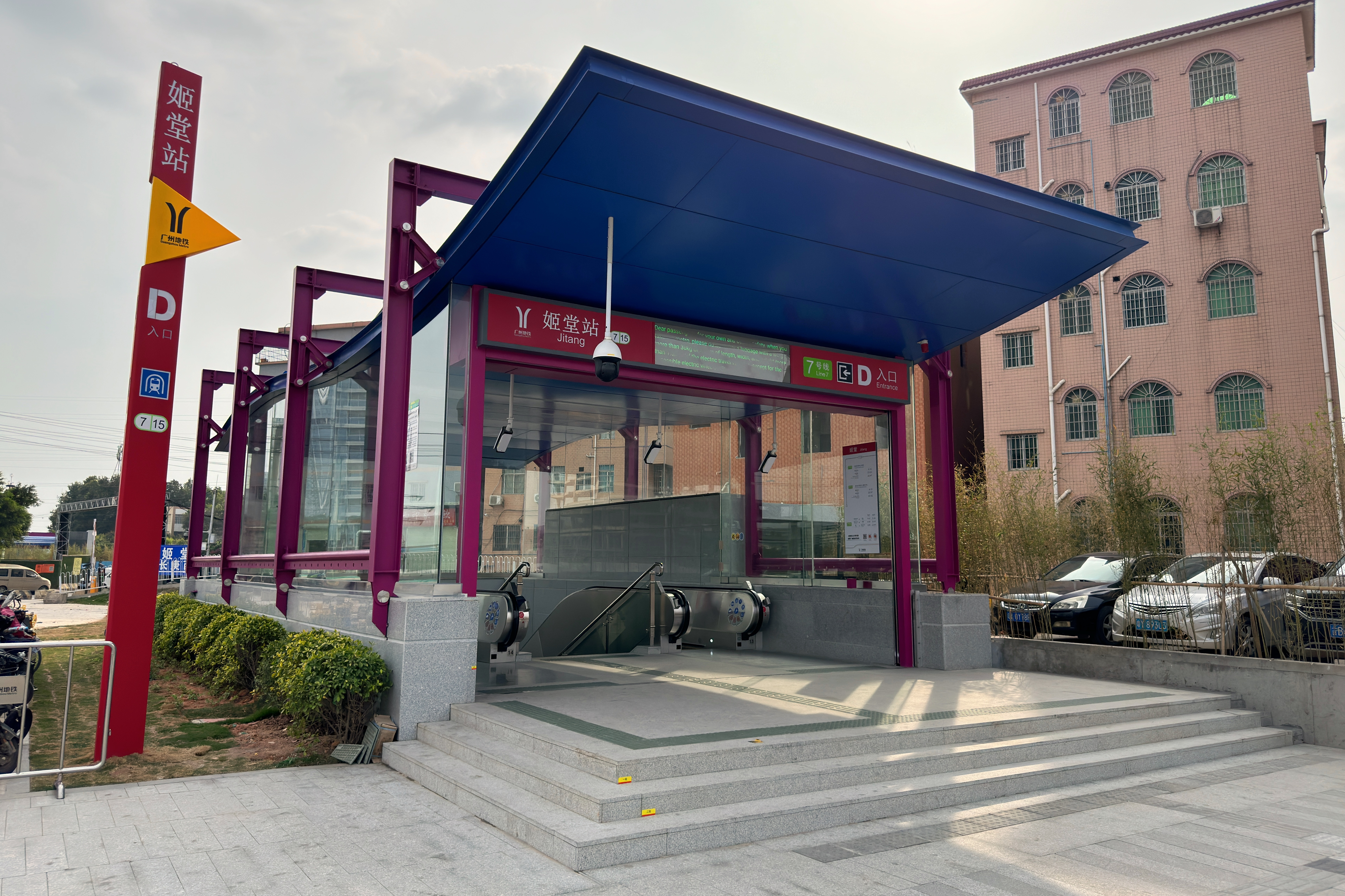
Entrance D

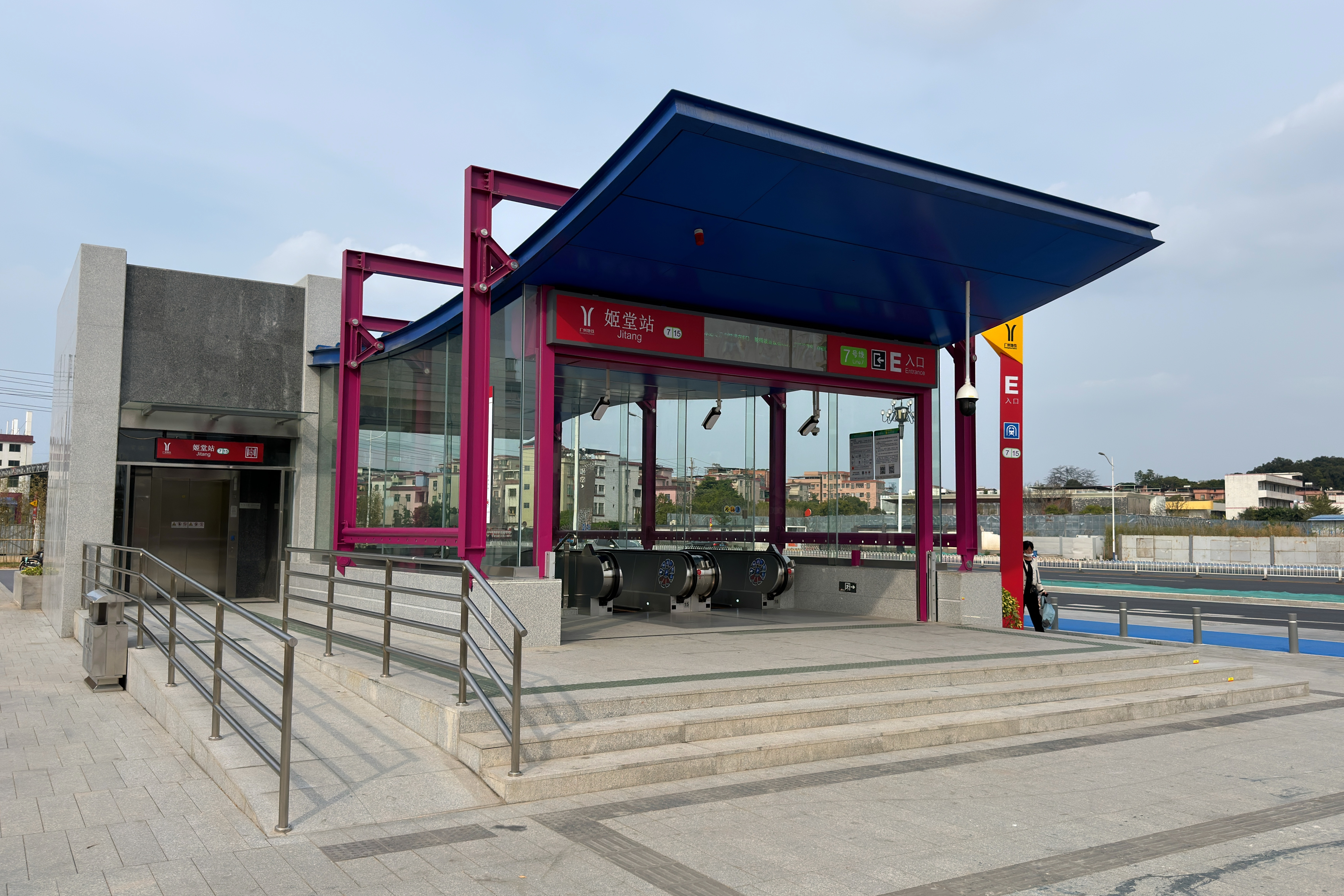
Entrance E

== History ==
The station started construction of the main station structure on 20 March 2020, topped out the main structure on 13 October 2022, and topped out of the auxiliary structures on 28 March 2023.

The station completed the "three rights" transfer on 31 October 2023. At 12:00 on December 28, the station was put into use with the opening of Line 7 Phase 2.

== Future development ==
The station is planned to have an interchange with Line 19.
