= Kefeng Lu station =

Guangzhou Metro Line 7 station

Kefeng Lu 科丰路
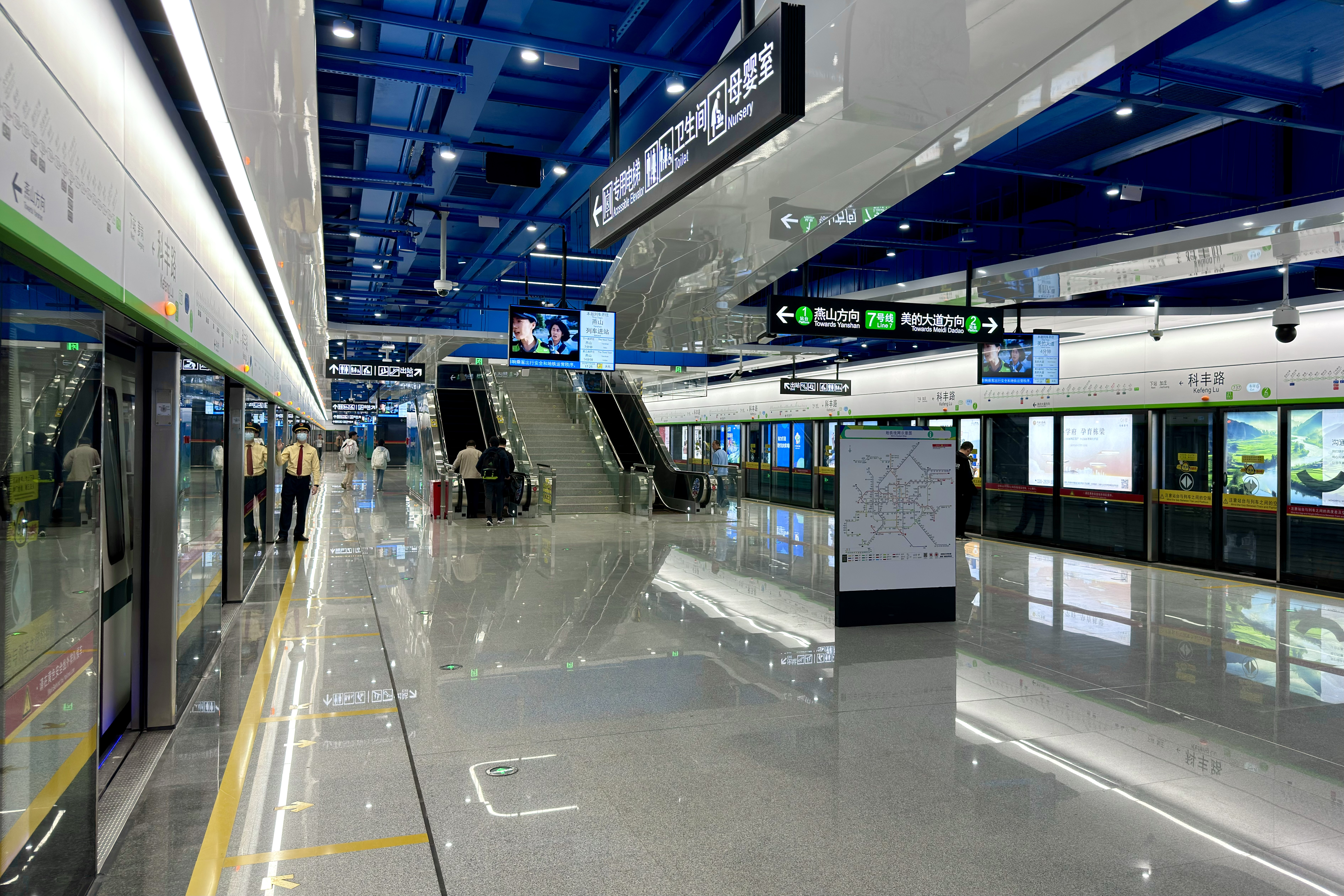
- Platform

Chinese name
- Simplified Chinese: 科丰路站
- Traditional Chinese: 科豐路站
Transcriptions
Standard Mandarin
- Hanyu Pinyin: Kēfēnglù Zhàn
Yue: Cantonese
- Yale Romanization: Fōfūng Louh Jaahm
- Jyutping: Fo^{1}fung^{1} Lou^{6} Zaam^{6}

General information
- Location: Intersection of Kefeng Road (科丰路) and Kaitai Avenue (开泰大道), Lianhe Subdistrict; Huangpu District, Guangzhou, Guangdong; China
- Coordinates: 23°9′55.87″N 113°27′38.88″E
- Operator: Guangzhou Metro Co. Ltd.
- Line: Line 7
- Platforms: 2 (1 island platform)
- Tracks: 2

Construction
- Structure type: Underground
- Accessible: Yes

Other information
- Station code: 717

History
- Opened: 28 December 2023 (2 years ago)

Services
Preceding station	Guangzhou Metro	Following station
Jiazhuang towards Meidi Dadao	Line 7	Luogang towards Yanshan
Location

Kefeng Lu Station (simplified Chinese: 科丰路站; traditional Chinese: 科豐路站; pinyin: Kēfēnglù Zhàn; Cantonese Yale: Fōfūng Louh Jaahm) is a station of Guangzhou Metro Line 7, located underground at the intersection of Kefeng Road and Kaitai Avenue in Guangzhou's Huangpu District. It opened on 28 December 2023, with the opening of Phase 2 of Line 7.

== Station layout ==
G	Street level	Exits B, C, D
L1; Concourse	Lobby	Ticket Machines, Customer Service, Shops, Police Station, Security Facilities
L2; Platforms	Platform 2	7 towards Meidi Dadao (Jiazhuang)
L2; Platforms	Island platform, doors will open on the left (Toilets, Nursery)
L2; Platforms	Platform 1	7 towards Yanshan (Luogang)

=== Entrances/exits ===
The station was designed with 4 points of entry/exit. In the station's initial opening, only Exits C and D on the west side of the Kefeng Road intersection of Kaitai Avenue were opened, while Exit B on the other side of the road was opened on 26 January 2025. In addition, the construction of Exit A has not yet been implemented. Exit B is equipped with a ramp, and Exit C is equipped with an elevator.

The distance between this station and Suyuan Station is about 800 meters. Guangzhou Metro believes that the distance between the two stations is too long, and there are interchanges to Line 6 and Line 21 respectively at Luogang and Shuixi stations, so it does not set up a long transfer passageway to connect the two stations, but reserves an interface to connect to Luogang Wanda Plaza at Exit C, which is connected to Suyuan Station.

- B: Kaitai Avenue
- C: Kaitai Avenue
- D: Kaitai Avenue
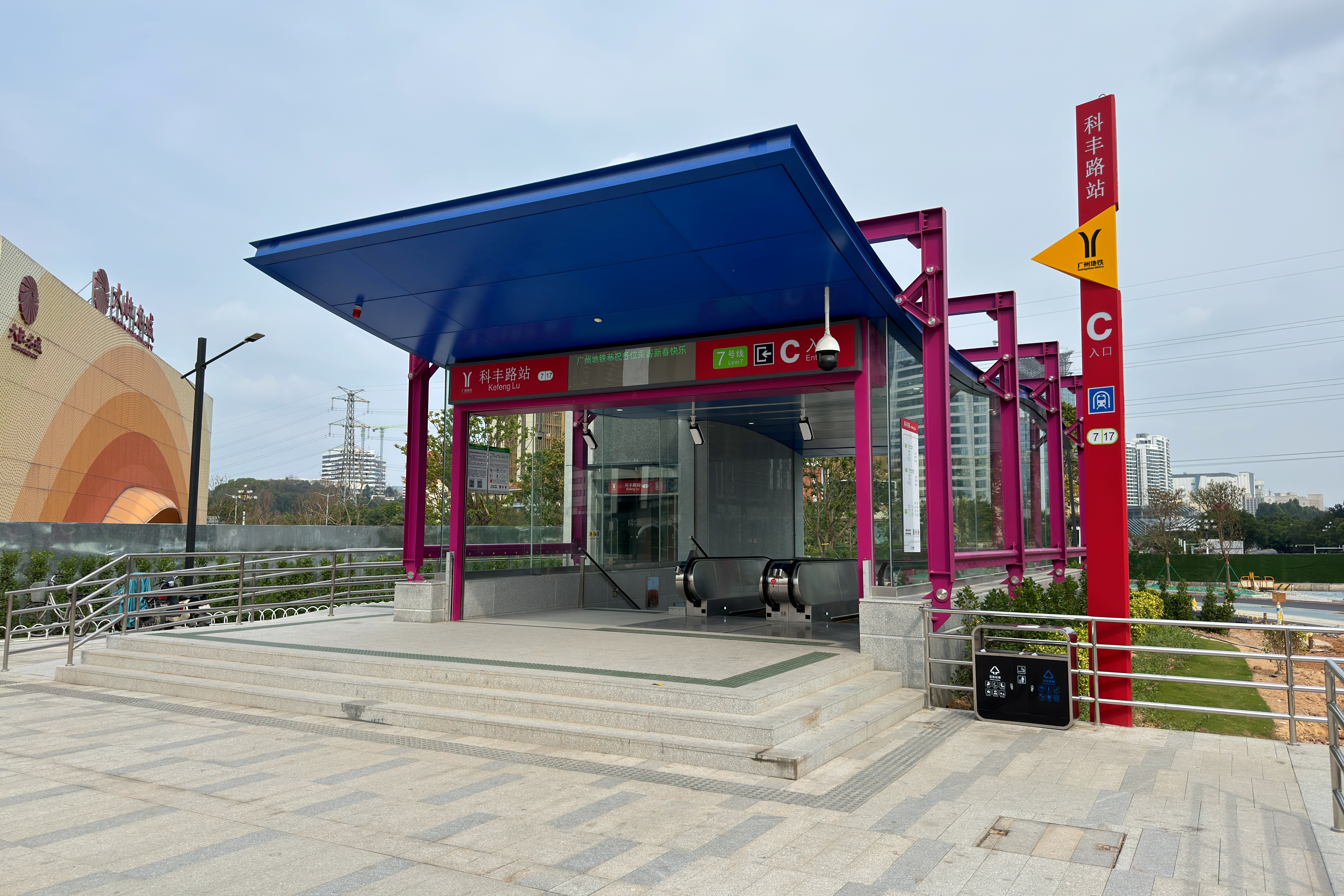
Entrance C

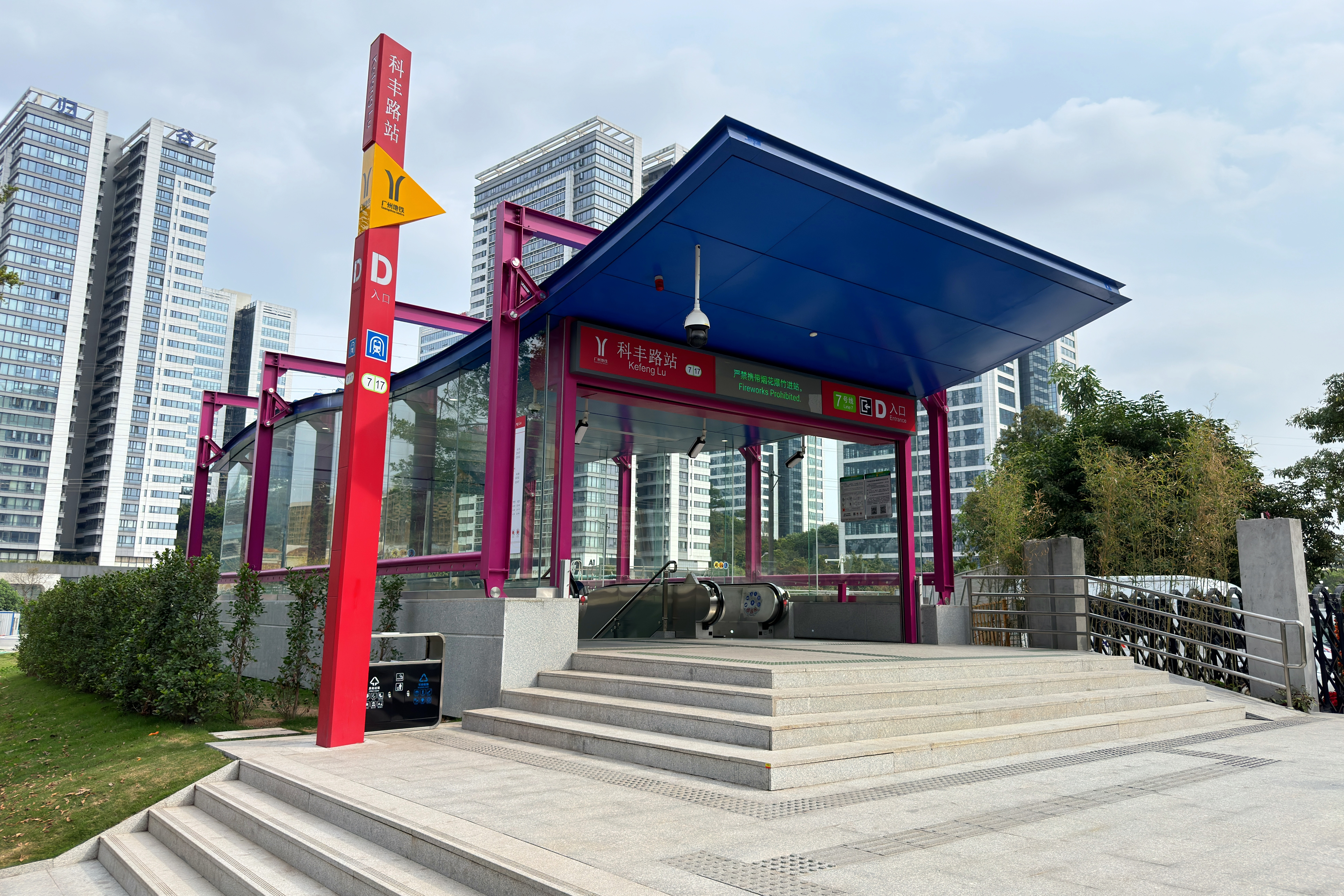
Entrance D

== Gallery ==
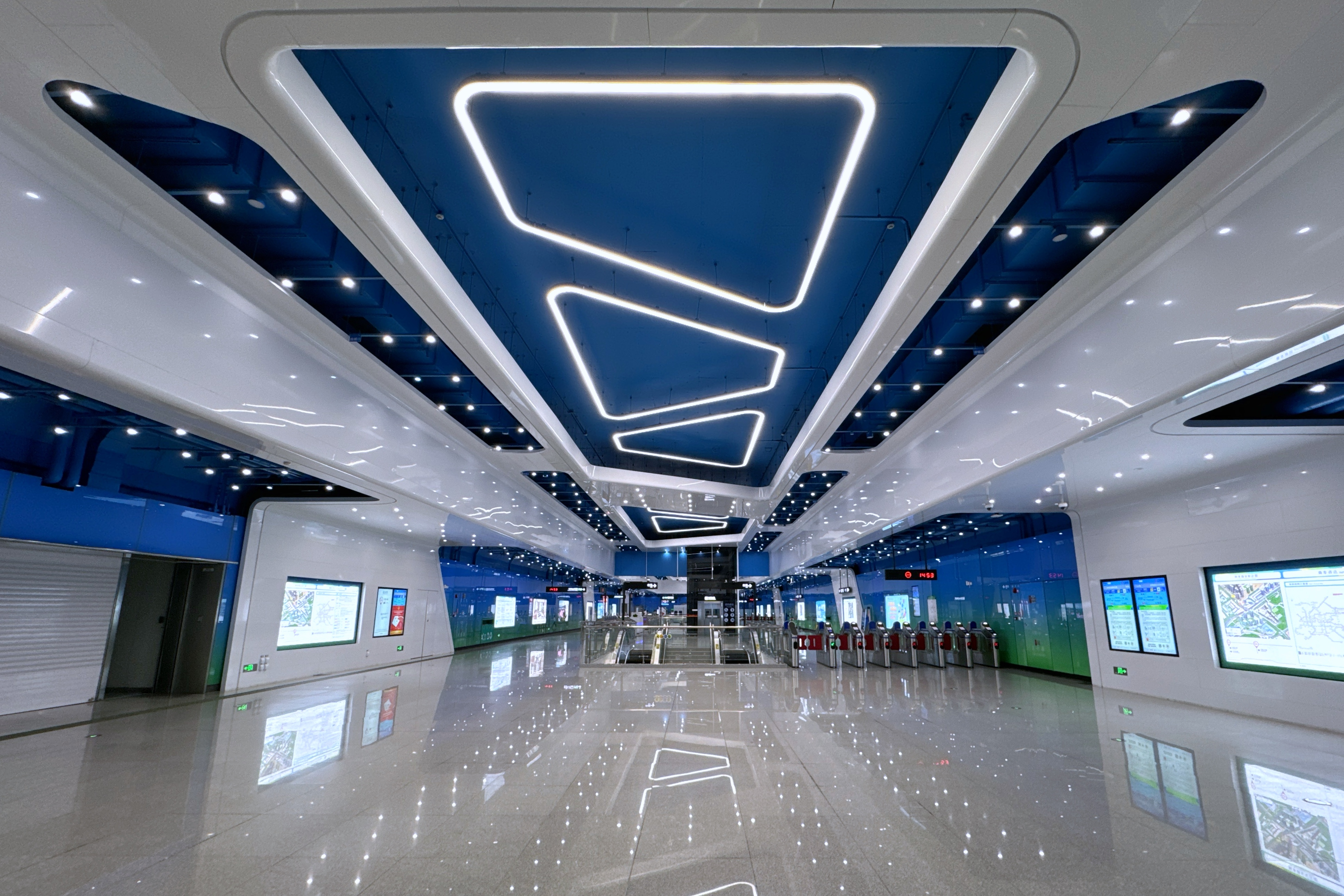
Concourse

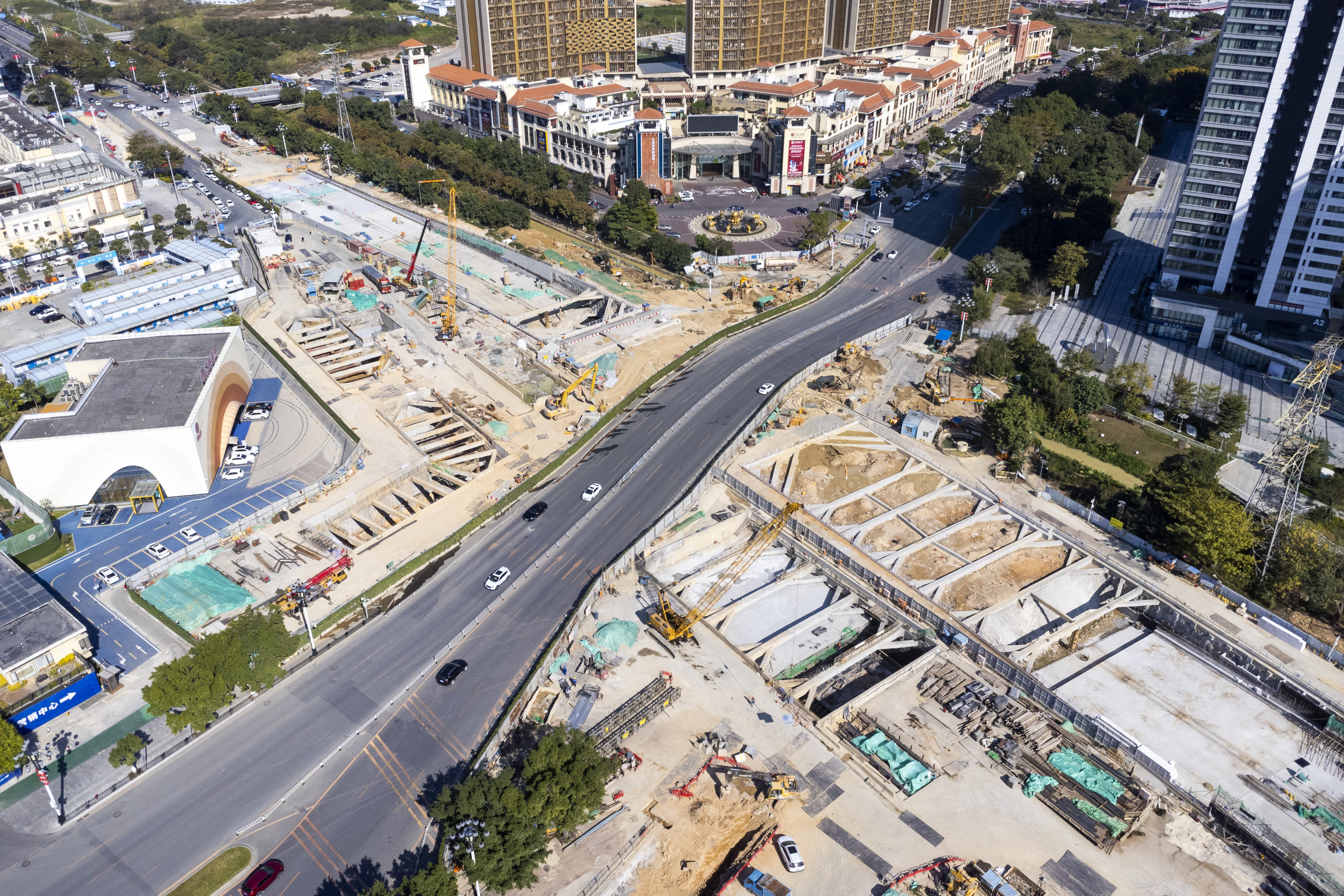
Station construction site (January 2023)

== History ==
In Phase III of the Guangzhou Metro construction plan approved in 2017, Line 7 will set up Xinyang Xilu station near the intersection of Xinyang Road West and Kaitai Avenue (i.e., the east side of the station's current location). In 2018, during the EIA phase of this line, Xinyang Xilu Station was adjusted to the location of this station and renamed to Kefeng Lu station, which was finally implemented. On 4 September 2019, the station site began enclosure construction.

At 12:00 on December 28, the station was put into use with the opening of Line 7 Phase 2.
