= Jiazhuang station =

Guangzhou Metro Line 7 station

Jiazhuang 加庄
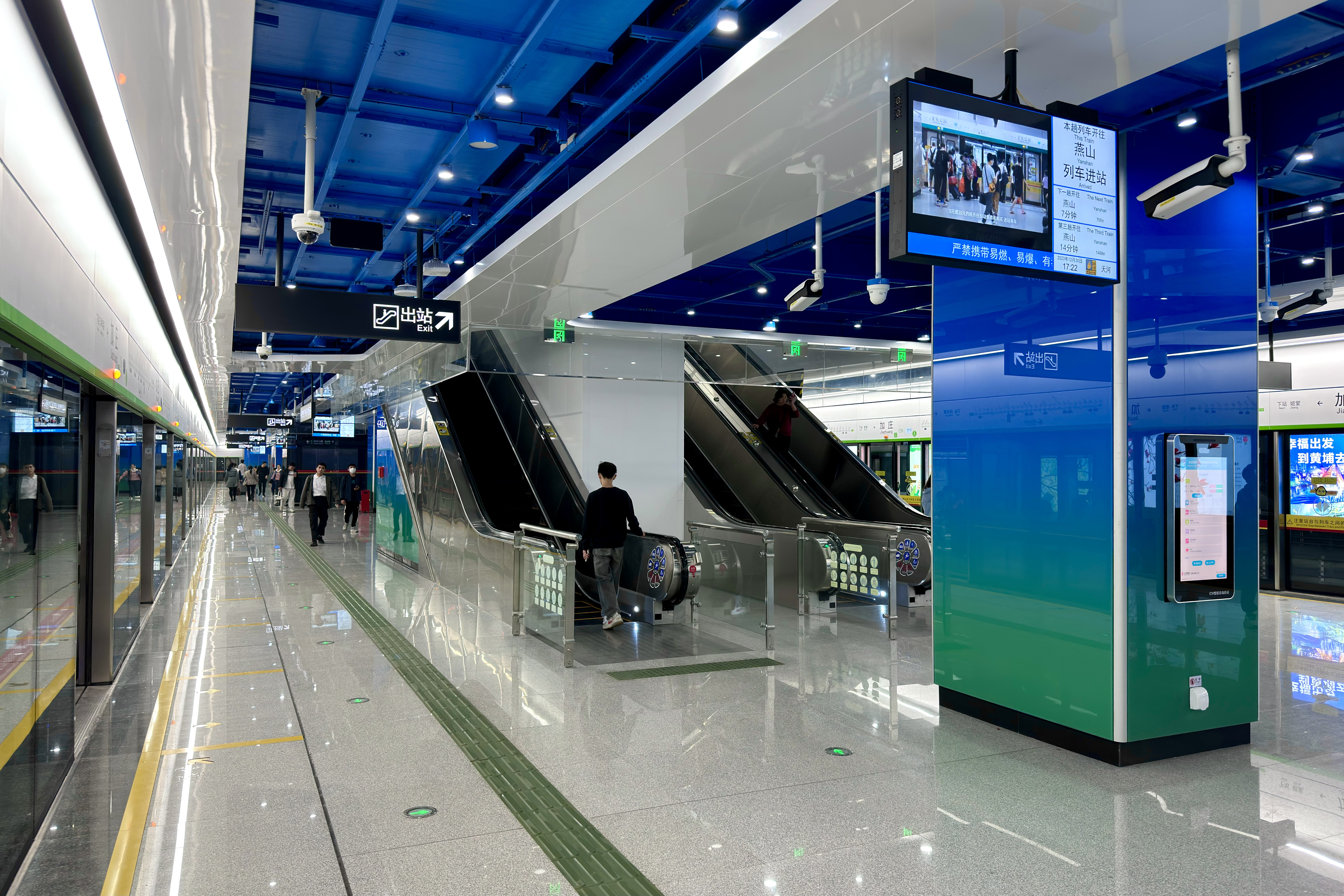
- Platform

Chinese name
- Simplified Chinese: 加庄站
- Traditional Chinese: 加莊站
Transcriptions
Standard Mandarin
- Hanyu Pinyin: Jiāzhuāng Zhàn
Yue: Cantonese
- Yale Romanization: Gājōng Jaahm
- Jyutping: Gaa^{1}zong^{1} Zaam^{6}

General information
- Location: Fork of Nanyun 5th Road (南云五路) and Kefeng Road (科丰路), border of Lianhe and Dasha Subdistricts; Huangpu District, Guangzhou, Guangdong; China
- Coordinates: 23°9′2.34″N 113°27′17.64″E
- Operator: Guangzhou Metro Co. Ltd.
- Line: Line 7
- Platforms: 2 (1 island platform)
- Tracks: 2

Construction
- Structure type: Underground
- Accessible: Yes

Other information
- Station code: 716

History
- Opened: 28 December 2023 (2 years ago)

Services
Preceding station	Guangzhou Metro	Following station
Jitang towards Meidi Dadao	Line 7	Kefeng Lu towards Yanshan
Location

Jiazhuang Station (simplified Chinese: 加庄站; traditional Chinese: 加莊站; pinyin: Jiāzhuāng Zhàn; Cantonese Yale: Gājōng Jaahm) is a station of Guangzhou Metro Line 7, located underground at the fork of Nanyun 5th Road and Kefeng Road in Guangzhou's Huangpu District. It opened on 28 December 2023, with the opening of Phase 2 of Line 7.

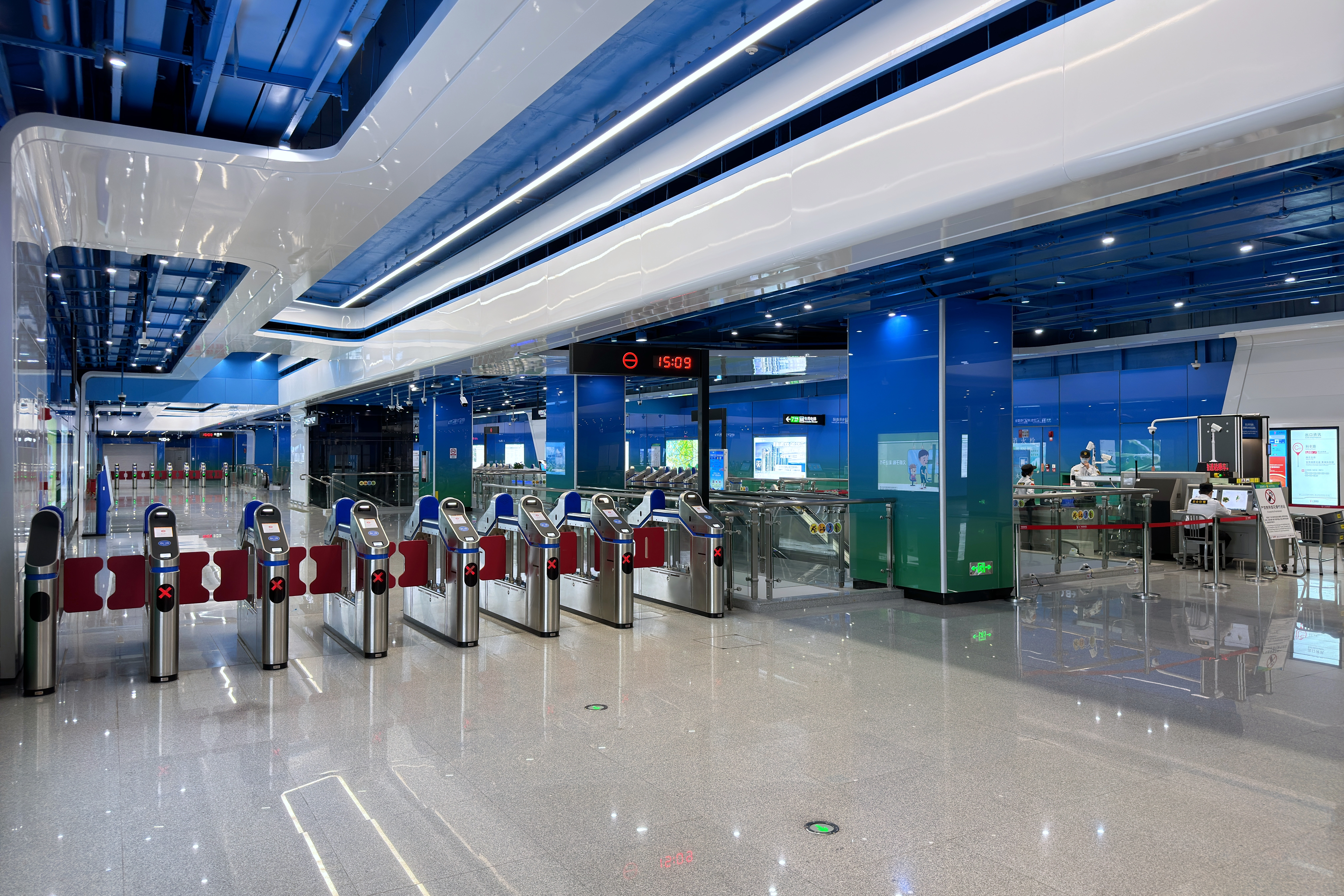
Concourse

== Station layout ==
G	Street level	Exits B, C, D
L1; Concourse	Lobby	Ticket Machines, Customer Service, Shops, Police Station, Security Facilities
L2; Platforms	Platform 2	7 towards Meidi Dadao (Jitang)
L2; Platforms	Island platform, doors will open on the left (Toilets, Nursery)
L2; Platforms	Platform 1	7 towards Yanshan (Kefeng Lu)

=== Entrances/exits ===
The station has 3 points of entry/exit. Exit C is equipped with an elevator.

- B: Kefeng Road
- C: Kefeng Road
- D: Kefeng Road (stairs only)
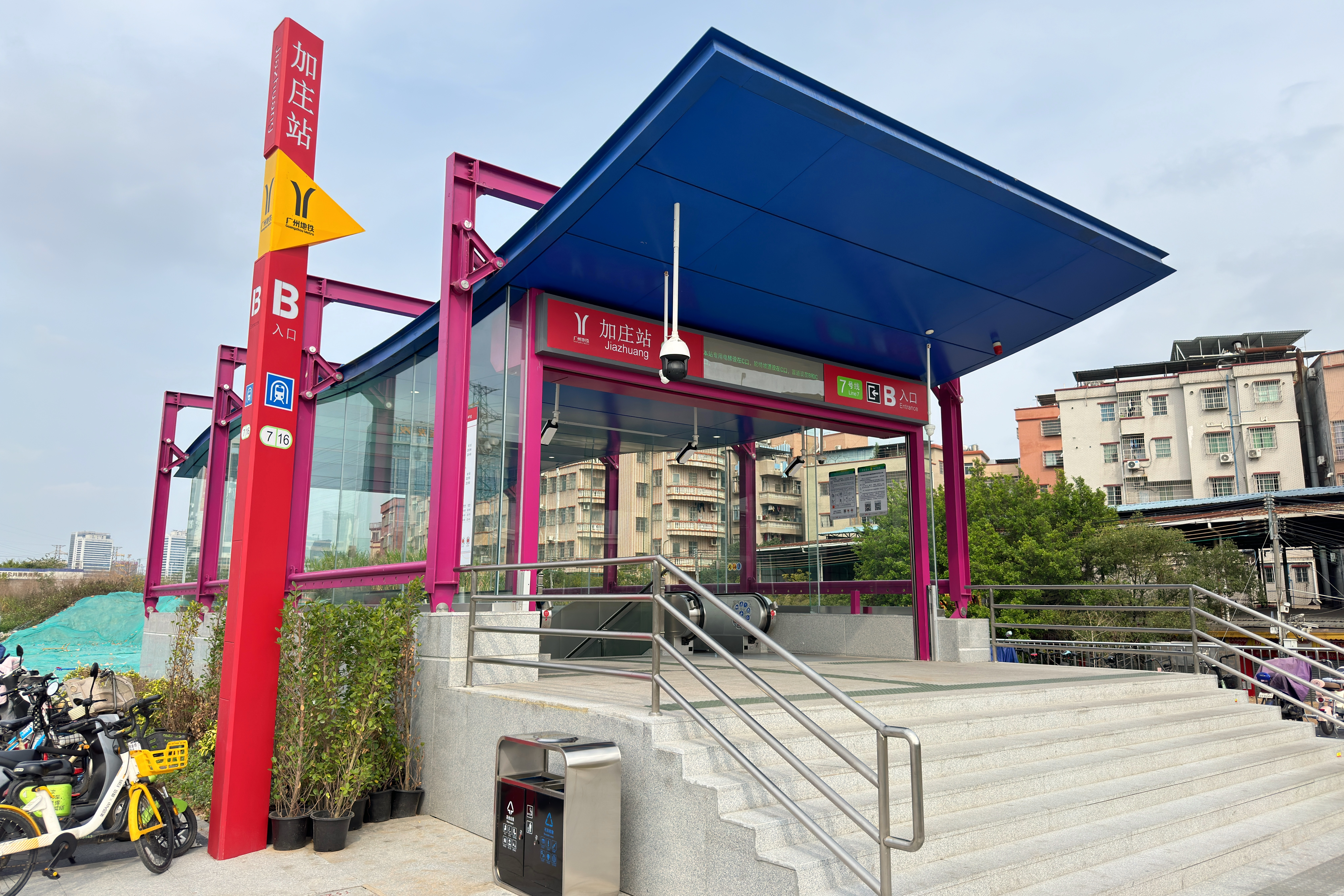
Entrance B

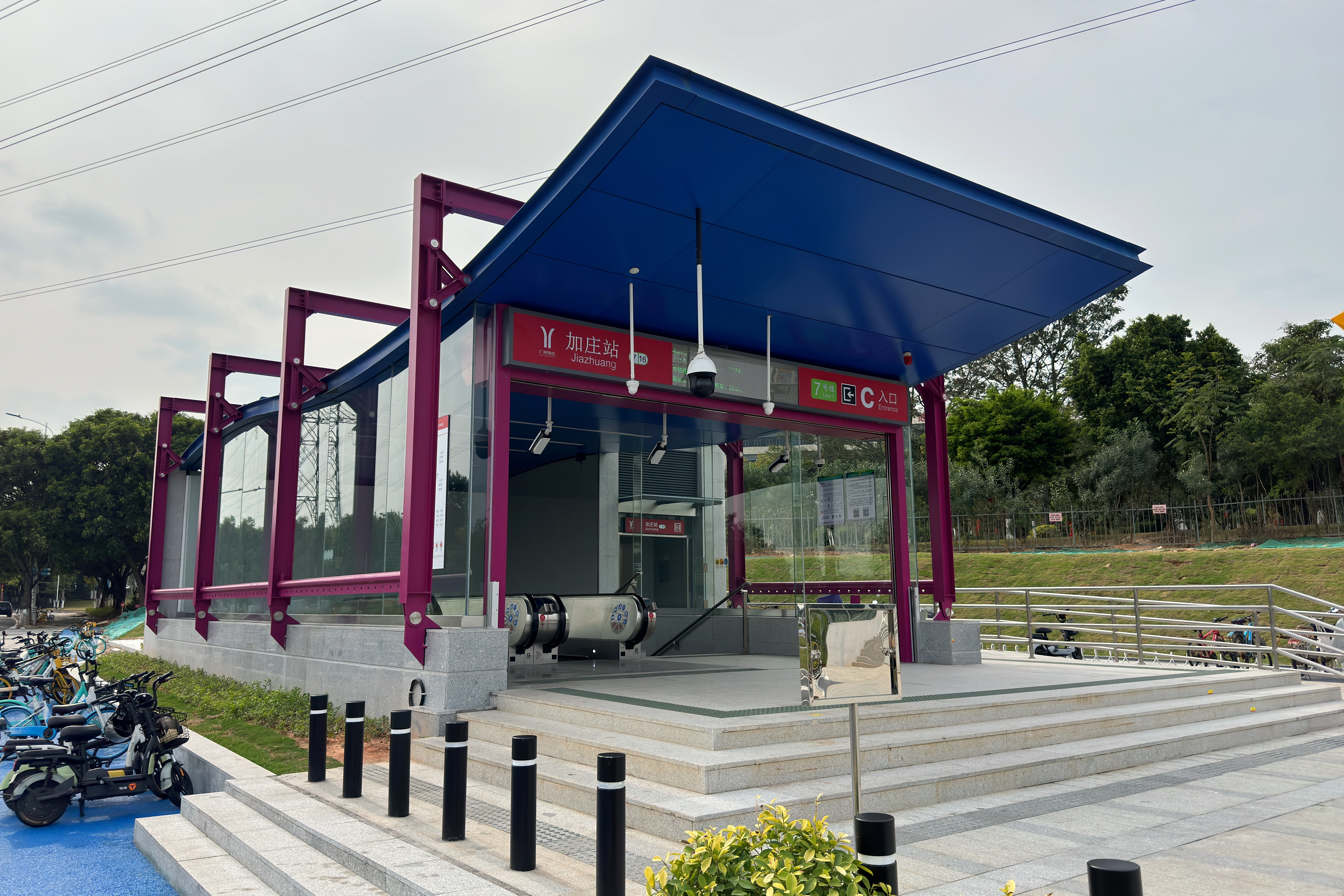
Entrance C

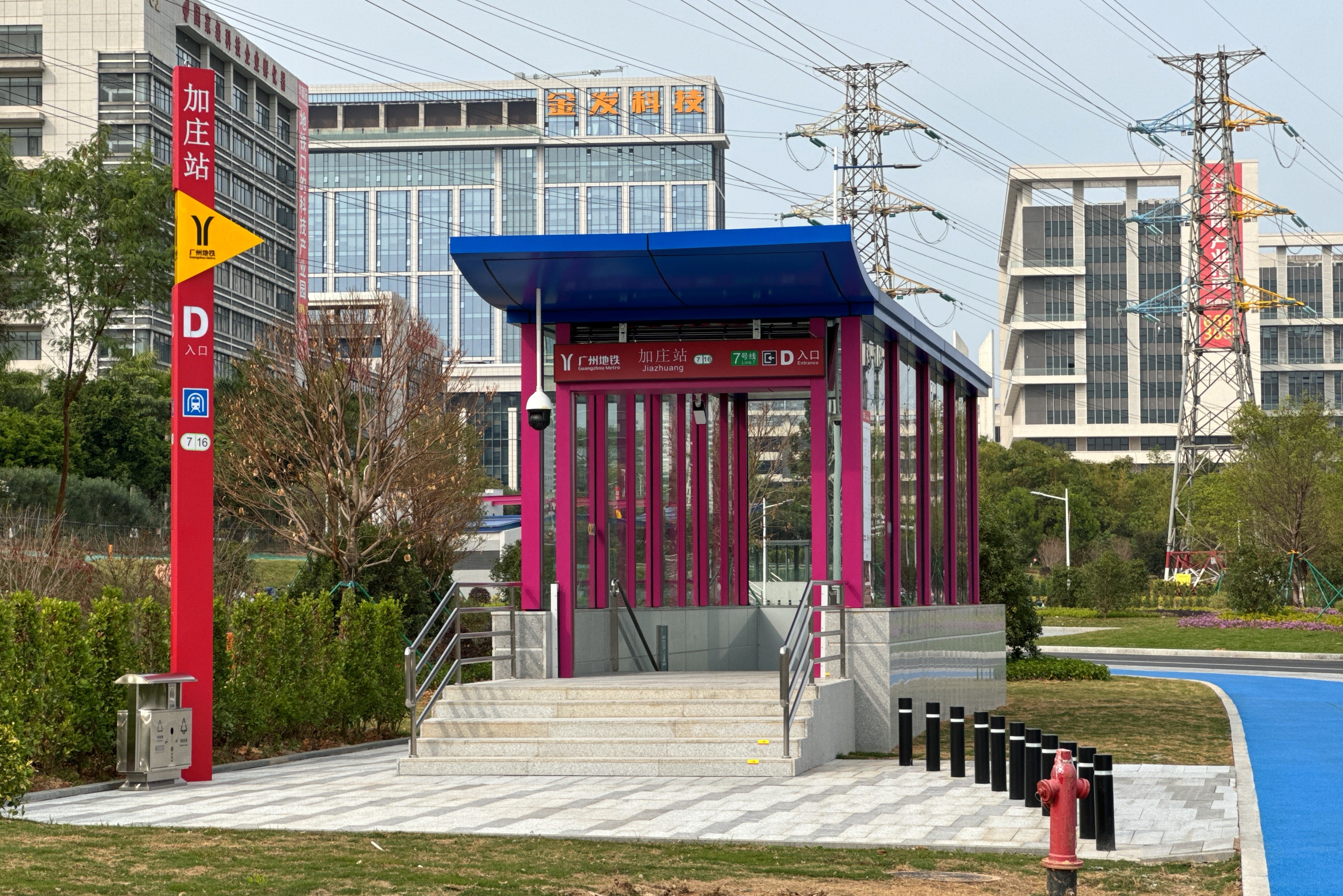
Entrance D

== History ==
In July 2019, the station site began enclosure construction. In September the same year, the station started construction of the main station structure. On 16 August 2020, the main structure of the second section of this station was topped out.

The station completed the "three rights" transfer on 7 November 2023. At 12:00 on December 28, the station was put into use with the opening of Line 7 Phase 2.

== Future development ==
The station is planned to have an interchange with Line 23. It was originally not designated to be an interchange station, but got altered in July 2018.
