= Xiyue station =

Foshan Metro Line 3 station

Xiyue 西约
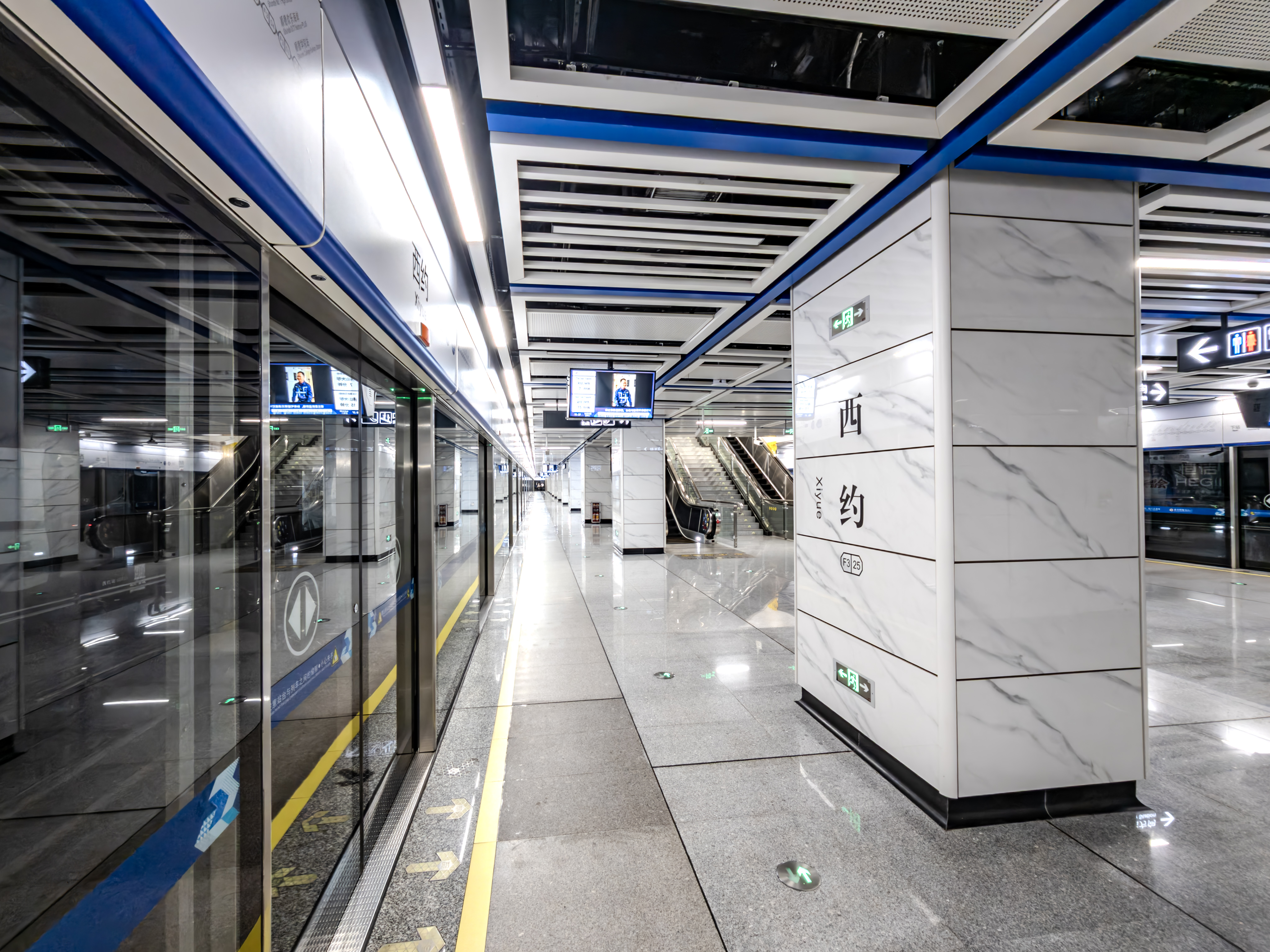
- Platform 1

Chinese name
- Chinese: 西约站
Transcriptions
Standard Mandarin
- Hanyu Pinyin: Xīyuē Zhàn
Yue: Cantonese
- Yale Romanization: Sāijǒek Jaahm
- Jyutping: Sai^{1}joek^{3} Zaam^{6}

General information
- Location: Intersection of Nanhai Boulevard (南海大道) and Haihui Road (海辉路), Guicheng Subdistrict; Nanhai District, Foshan, Guangdong; China
- Coordinates: 23°2′35.52″N 113°8′5.03″E
- Operator: Foshan Metro Operation Co., Ltd.
- Line: Line 3
- Platforms: 2 (1 island platform)
- Tracks: 2

Construction
- Structure type: Underground
- Accessible: Yes

Other information
- Station code: F325

History
- Opened: 23 August 2024 (2 years ago)
- Former names: Nanhai Square (南海广场)

Services
Preceding station	Foshan Metro	Following station
Diejiao towards Foshan University	Line 3	Guicheng towards Shunde College Railway Station
Location

Xiyue station (Chinese: 西约站; pinyin: Xīyuē Zhàn; Cantonese Yale: Sāijǒek Jaahm) is a station on Line 3 of Foshan Metro, located on Nanhai Boulevard in Foshan's Nanhai District. It opened on 23 August 2024.

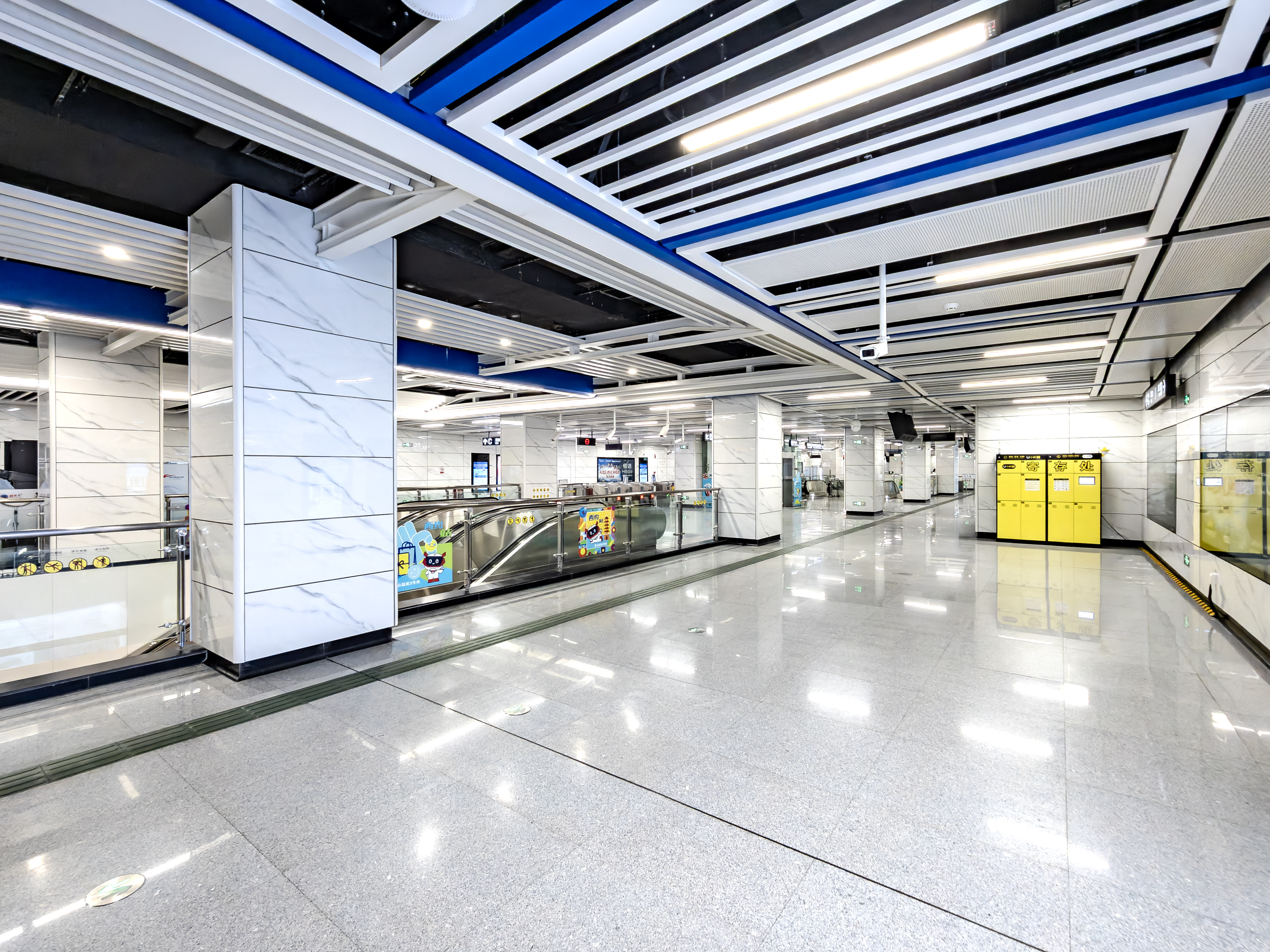
Concourse

== Station layout ==
The station has an island platform under Nanhai Boulevard.

G	-	Exits C & D
L1; Concourse	Lobby	Ticket Machines, Customer Service, Shops, Police Station, Security Facilities
L2	-	Station Equipment
L3; Platforms	Platform 1	3 towards Foshan University (Diejiao)
L3; Platforms	Island platform, doors will open on the left
L3; Platforms	Platform 2	3 towards Shunde College Railway Station (Guicheng)

=== Entrances/exits ===
The station has 4 points of entry/exit, lettered A-D, located on the east and west sides of Nanhai Avenue. In its initial opening, the station only opened Exits B and C on the east side of Nanhai Boulevard. None of the two entrances/exits had elevators, which meant the station was temporarily not accessible. Exit D was opened on 11 July 2026 and is equipped with an elevator, finally fulfilling the accessibility requirements after 2 years of opening.

- B: Nanhai Avenue North, Leigang Park
- C: Nanhai Avenue North, Nanhai Sports Center
- D: Nanhai Avenue North
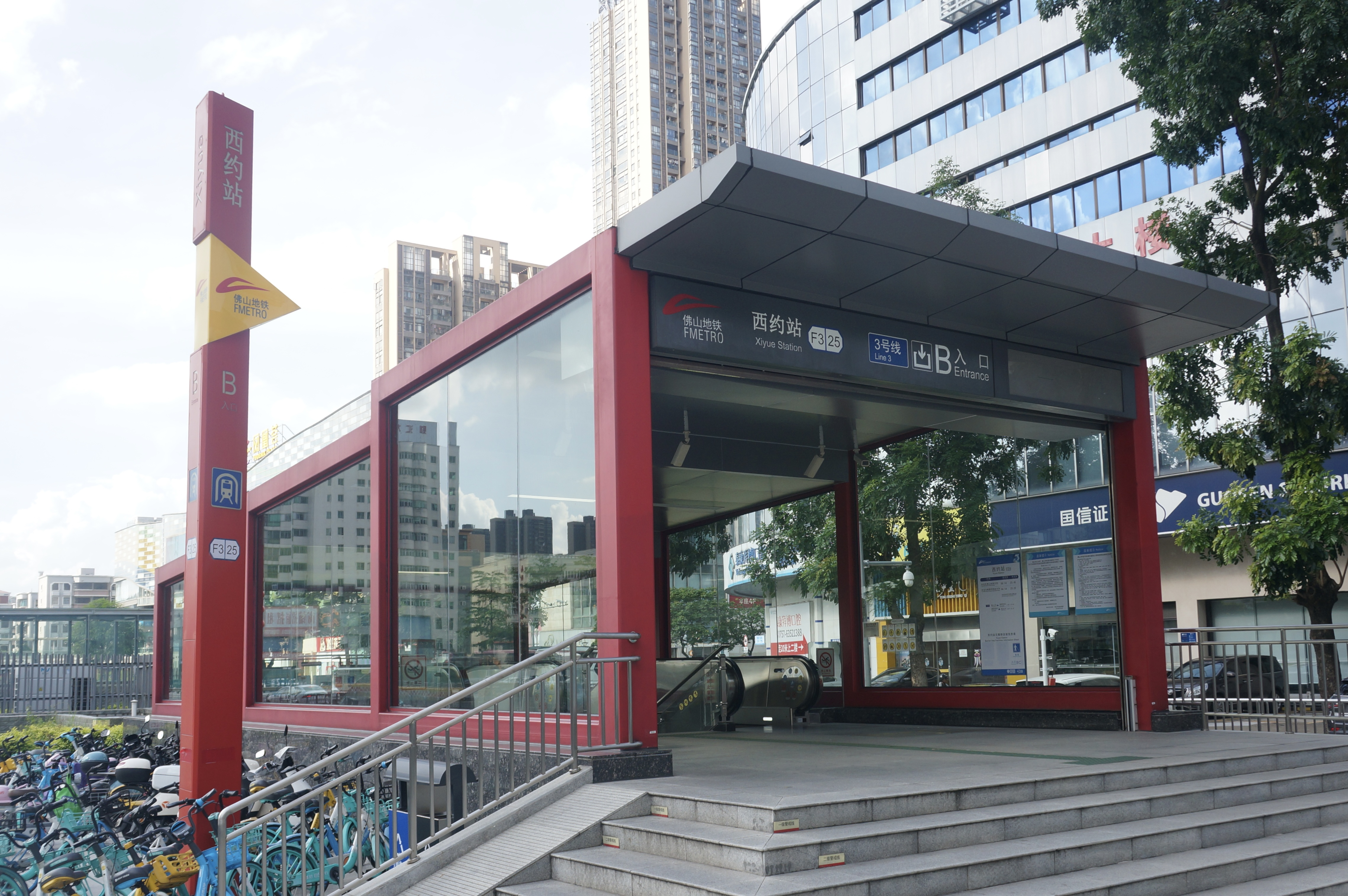
Entrance B

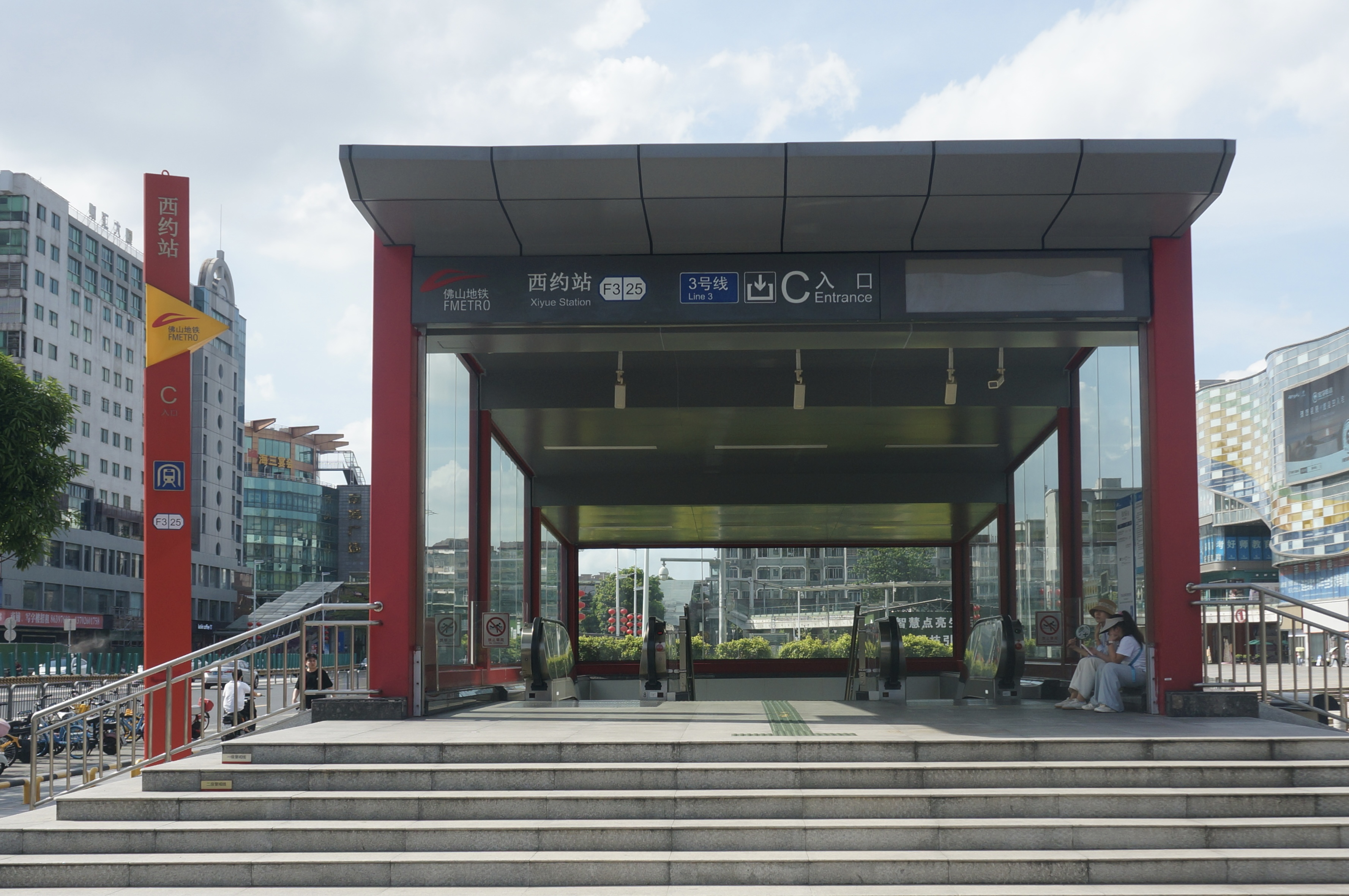
Entrance C

== History ==
The station was called Nanhai Square station during the planning and construction phase, and in 2022 it was renamed to Xiyue station. The site began enclosure construction on 11 August 2017. On 29 March 2019, the pouring of the first base plate of this station was completed. On 31 August 2019, the main structure topped out.

The station opened on 23 August 2024 as part of the section from "Zhen'an to Zhongshan Park". (Note: Prior to opening, it was known as part of the 'rear section' or 'section under construction')
