= Guicheng station =

Guangfo Metro and Foshan Metro Line 3 station

Guicheng 桂城
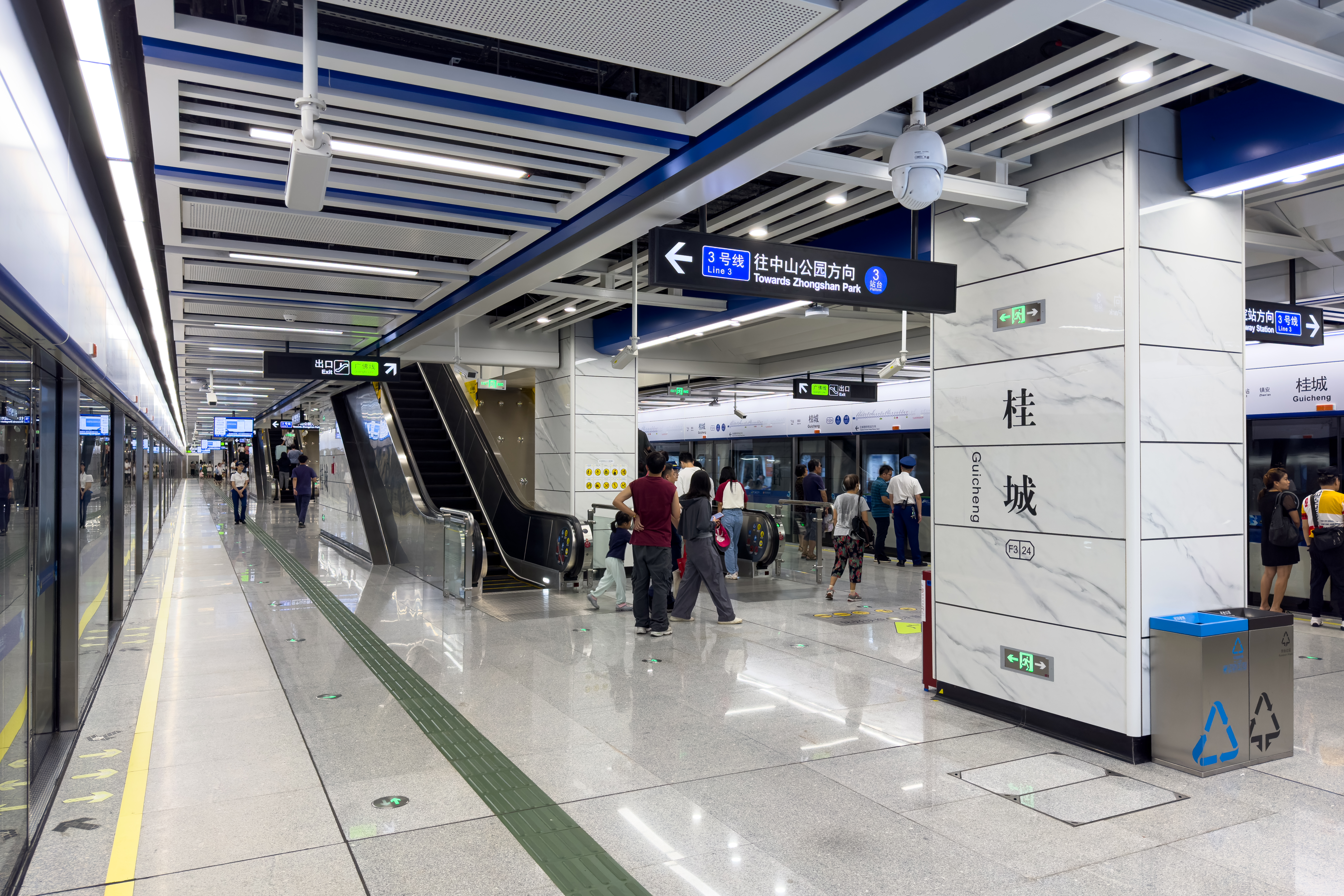
- Line 3 platform

Chinese name
- Chinese: 桂城站
Transcriptions
Standard Mandarin
- Hanyu Pinyin: Guìchéng Zhàn
Yue: Cantonese
- Yale Romanization: Gwaisìhng Jaahm
- Jyutping: Gwai^{3}sing^{4} Zaam^{6}

General information
- Location: Intersection of Nangui Road (南桂路) and Nanhai Boulevard (南海大道), Nanhai District, Foshan, Guangdong; China
- Coordinates: 23°2′2.760″N 113°8′8.844″E
- Operator: Foshan Railway Investment Construction Group Co. Ltd. Guangzhou Metro Co. Ltd.
- Lines: Guangfo line Line 3
- Platforms: 4 (2 island platforms)
- Tracks: 4

Construction
- Structure type: Underground
- Accessible: Yes

Other information
- Station code: GF11 F324

History
- Opened: Guangfo line: 3 November 2010 (15 years ago); Line 3: 23 August 2024 (2 years ago)

Services
Preceding station	Foshan Metro	Following station
Chao'an towards Xincheng Dong	Guangfo Line	Nangui Lu towards Lijiao
Xiyue towards Foshan University	Line 3	Zhen'an towards Shunde College Railway Station
Location

Guicheng Station (Chinese: 桂城站; pinyin: Guìchéng Zhàn; Cantonese Yale: Gwaisìhng Jaahm) is an interchange station between the Guangfo line and Line 3 of the Foshan Metro. It is located at the underground of the junction of Nanhai Avenue North (南海大道北) and Nangui Road (南桂路) in Guicheng Subdistrict, Nanhai District, Foshan, China. The station is situated at the central business district of Nanhai District, near the headquarters of Nanhai municipal government. Construction started in 2007 and was completed on 3 November 2010. The Line 3 station opened on 23 August 2024 as part of the section from "Zhen'an to Zhongshan Park", (Note: Prior to opening, it was known as part of the 'rear section' or 'section under construction') making the station an interchange station.

== Station structure ==
=== Platform layout ===
The station has three underground floors. The ground level is the exit, and it is surrounded by Nangui East Road, Nanhai AVenue and other nearby buildings. The first floor is the concourse, the second floor is the Guangfo line platform and the mezzanine of the Line 3 lower concourse, and the third floor is the Line 3 platform.

G	-	Exits A, B, D1, D2, E
L1; Concourse	Lobby	Ticket Machines, Customer Service, Shops, Police Station, Security Facilities
L2; Platforms	Platform 2	Guangfo towards Xincheng Dong (Chao'an)
L2; Platforms	Island platform, doors will open on the left
L2; Platforms	Platform 1	Guangfo towards Lijiao (Nangui Lu)
L2; Platforms	Buffer Area	Stairs and elevators towards concourse and 3 platforms Station Equipment
	Mezzanine	Transfer level between Guangfo and 3 platforms
L3; Platforms	Platform 3	3 towards Foshan University (Xiyue)
L3; Platforms	Island platform, doors will open on the left
L3; Platforms	Platform 4	3 towards Shunde College Railway Station (Zhen'an)

=== Concourse ===
The concourse is located on the first basement floor, which is an eccentric T-shaped concourse shared by Guangfo line and Line 3. The Line 3 section is north-south, and the Guangfo line section is east-west. The Line 3 section is divided into two parts, north and south.

The center of the Guangfo line part and the central southern part of Line 3 towards the north, and the northern part to the west are divided into fare-paid areas, where elevators, escalators, and stairs are installed for passengers to access the platforms. On the east side of the Guangfo line concourse, a separate fare-paid area is divided for passengers using the elevator connecting to the Guangfo line platform. As for the dedicated elevator connecting to the Guangfo line platform, since the elevator door is located on the east side of the non-paid area of the Guangfo line concourse, station staff must be requested for assistance when using it.

The station is equipped with a 7-Eleven convenience store and a bakery, as well as ticket machines, card recharge machines and other facilities.

=== Transfer ===
During the construction of Guangfo line, the transfer node and part of the lower level for the Line 3 platforms were reserved. When Line 3 was constructed, stairs were set up on both sides of the Guangfo Line platform to connect the lower transfer mezzanine, and a set of double escalators are set up at the transfer mezzanine to connect to the platform of Line 3. Considering the capacity gap between Guangfo line and Line 3, the interchange platform is currently only used in the direction from Guangfo line to Line 3, and its escalators are also set up to go to the platform of Line 3 in one direction, while the transfer of Line 3 to the Guangfo line requires transferring through the concourse.

=== Platform ===
The Guangfo line has an underground island platform, located underground on the south side of Nangui East Road. Line 3 also has an island platform located underground on Nanhai Avenue. The two-line platforms form roughly a "T" shape, with the Guangfo line above and Line 3 below.

The toilets and nursery room of the station are located at the northern end of the Line 3 platform.

In addition, during the construction of Guangfo line, the turnout location and related civil structures to the connecting line of Line 3 have been reserved in the southwest quadrant, and the follow-up works of the connecting line have been permanently shelved due to the design adjustment of Line 3.

=== Entrances/exits ===
The station has 5 points of entry/exit. In the early days of the Guangfo Metro, this station only had Exits B and D, both located on the south side of Nangui East Road, and passengers on the north side of the road had to cross the road to access the station until Exit D2 on the north side was opened on 28 January 2016. The original Exit D was reassigned to Exit D1 for distinction due to the opening of Exit D2. Exit A was opened on 2 September 2017.

After the opening of Line 3, in addition to the new Exit E on the east side of Nanhai Avenue, Exits A, B and D2 are all connected to the non-paid area of Line 3, so the signs leading to the above three entrances/exits of the Guangfo line and Line 3 concourses are marked as "Gate 1" and "Gate 2" respectively for distinction.

- A: Nanhai Boulevard
- B: Nanhai Boulevard, East Nangui Road, Nanhai District People's Government, Nanhai Branch of Foshan Public Security Bureau
- D1: Nangui East Road
- D2: Nangui East Road
- E: Nanhai Boulevard

Exit B is equipped with a stairlift and Exits D2 and E are equipped with elevators.

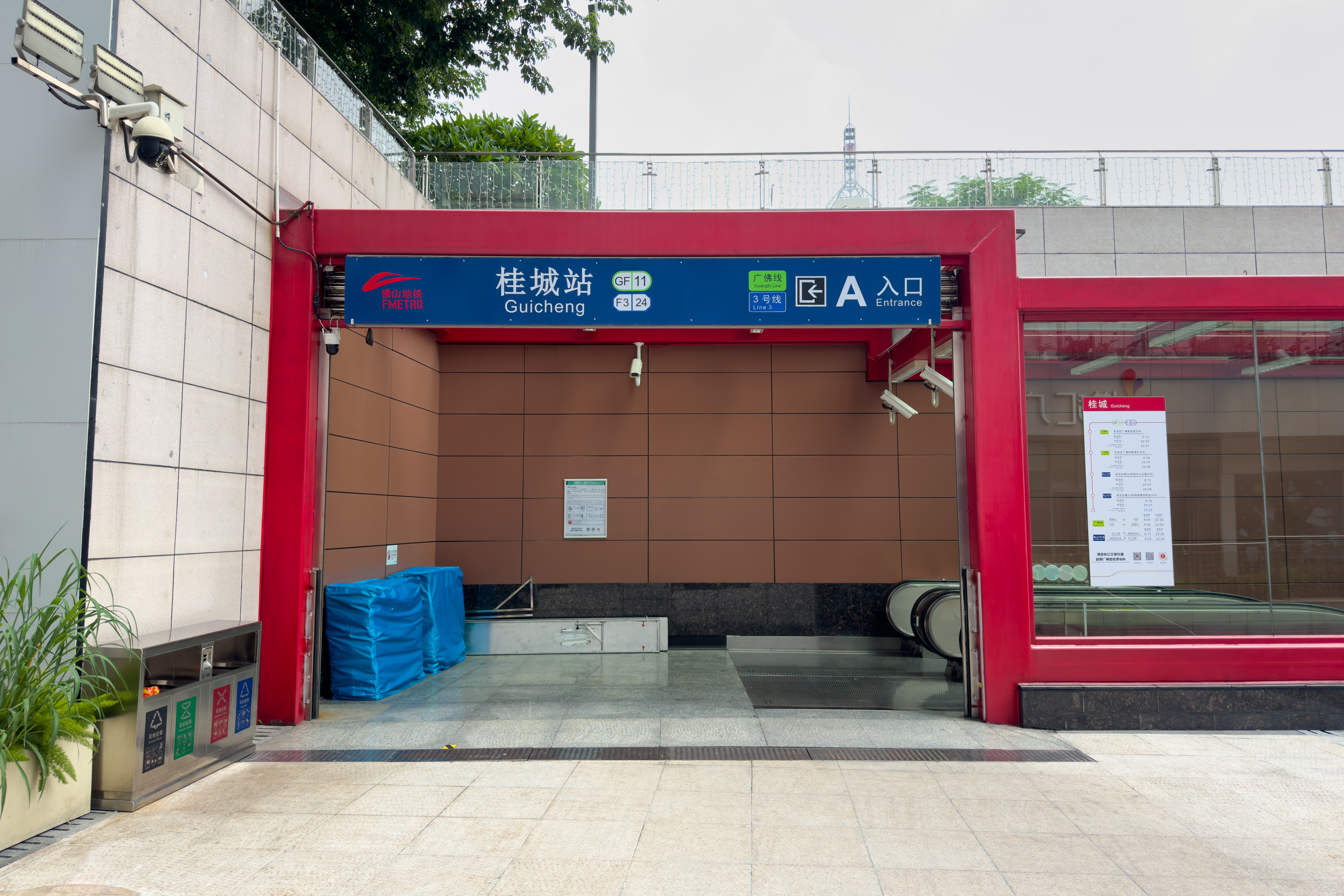
Entrance A

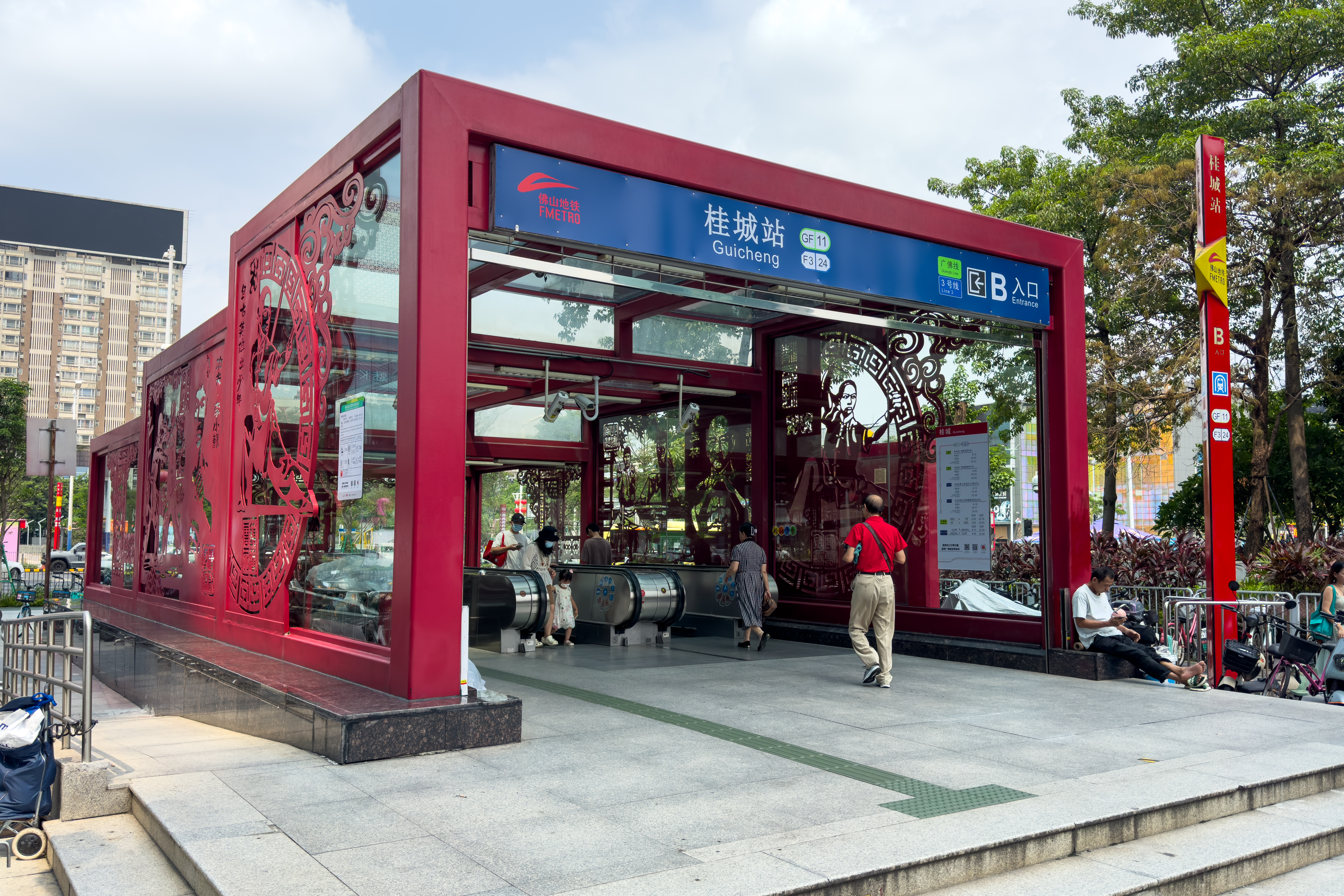
Entrance B

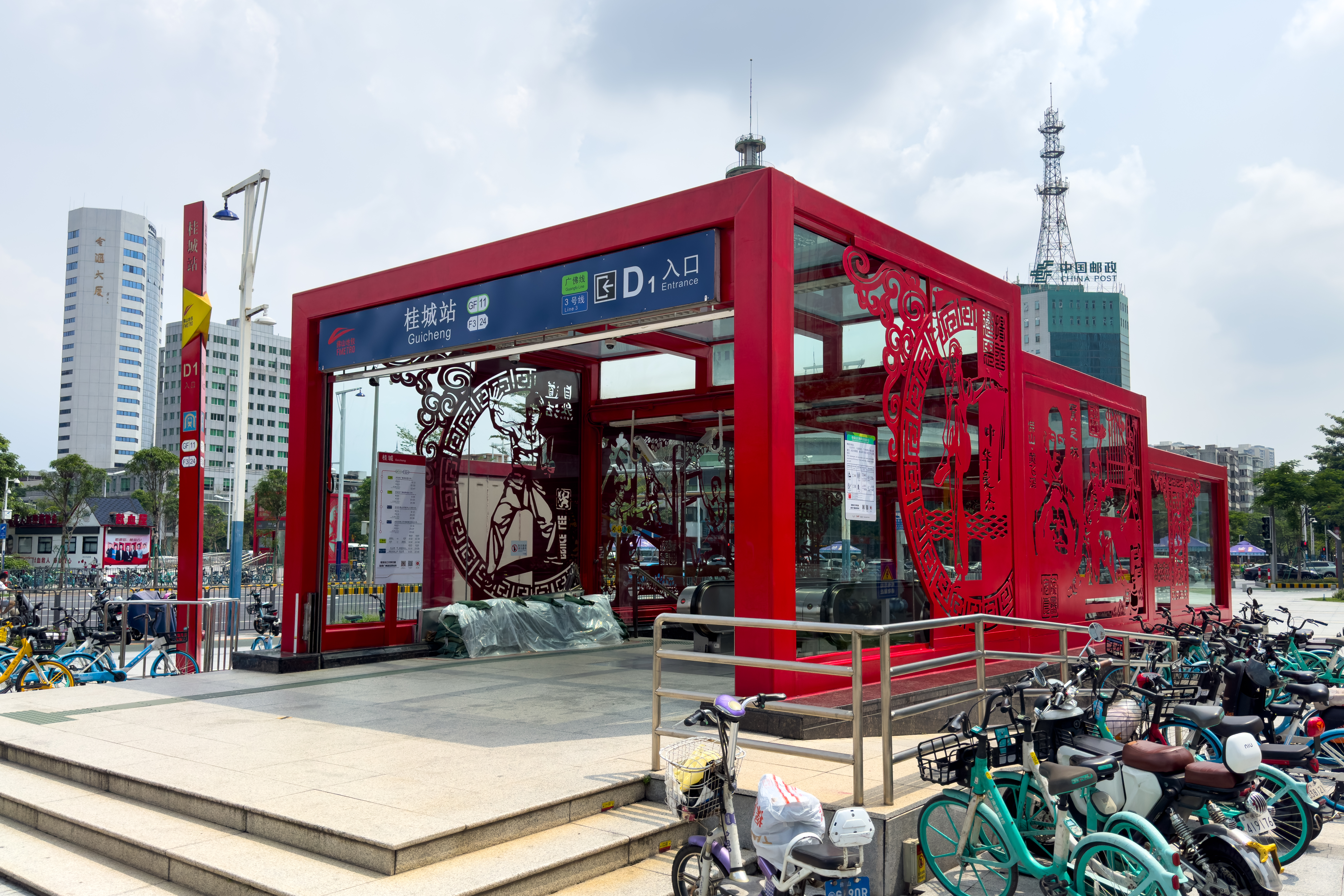
Entrance D1

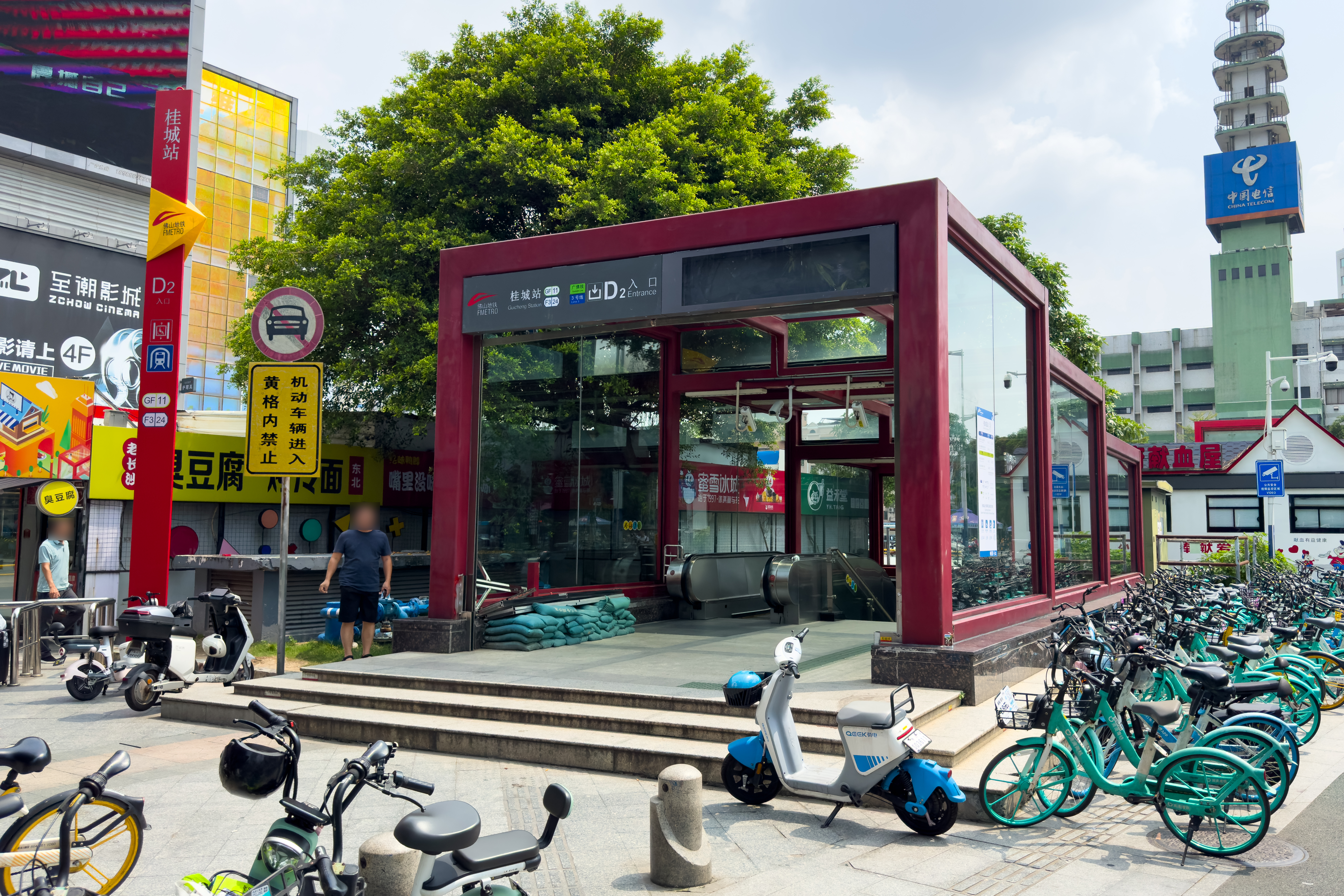
Entrance D2

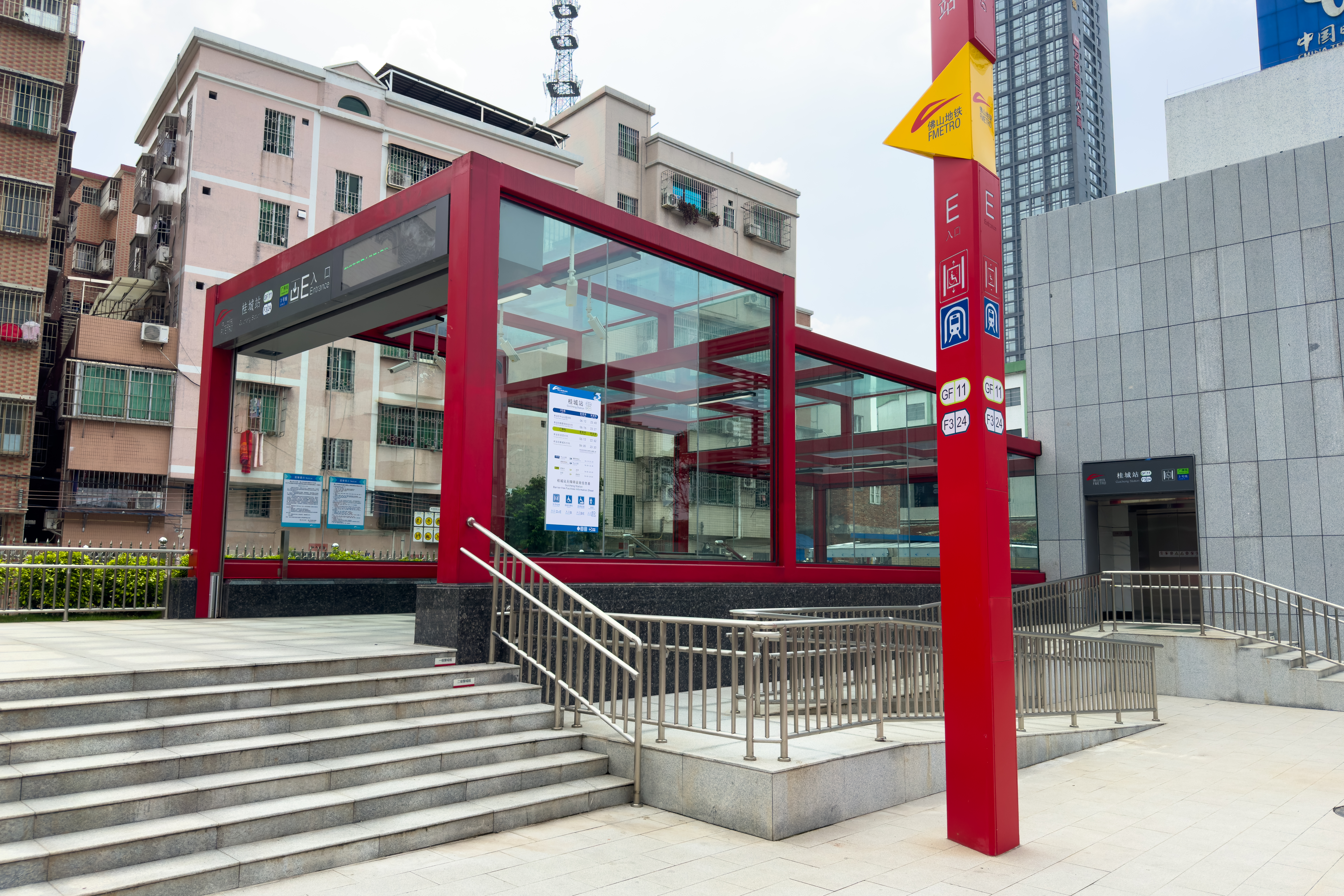
Entrance E

== Gallery ==
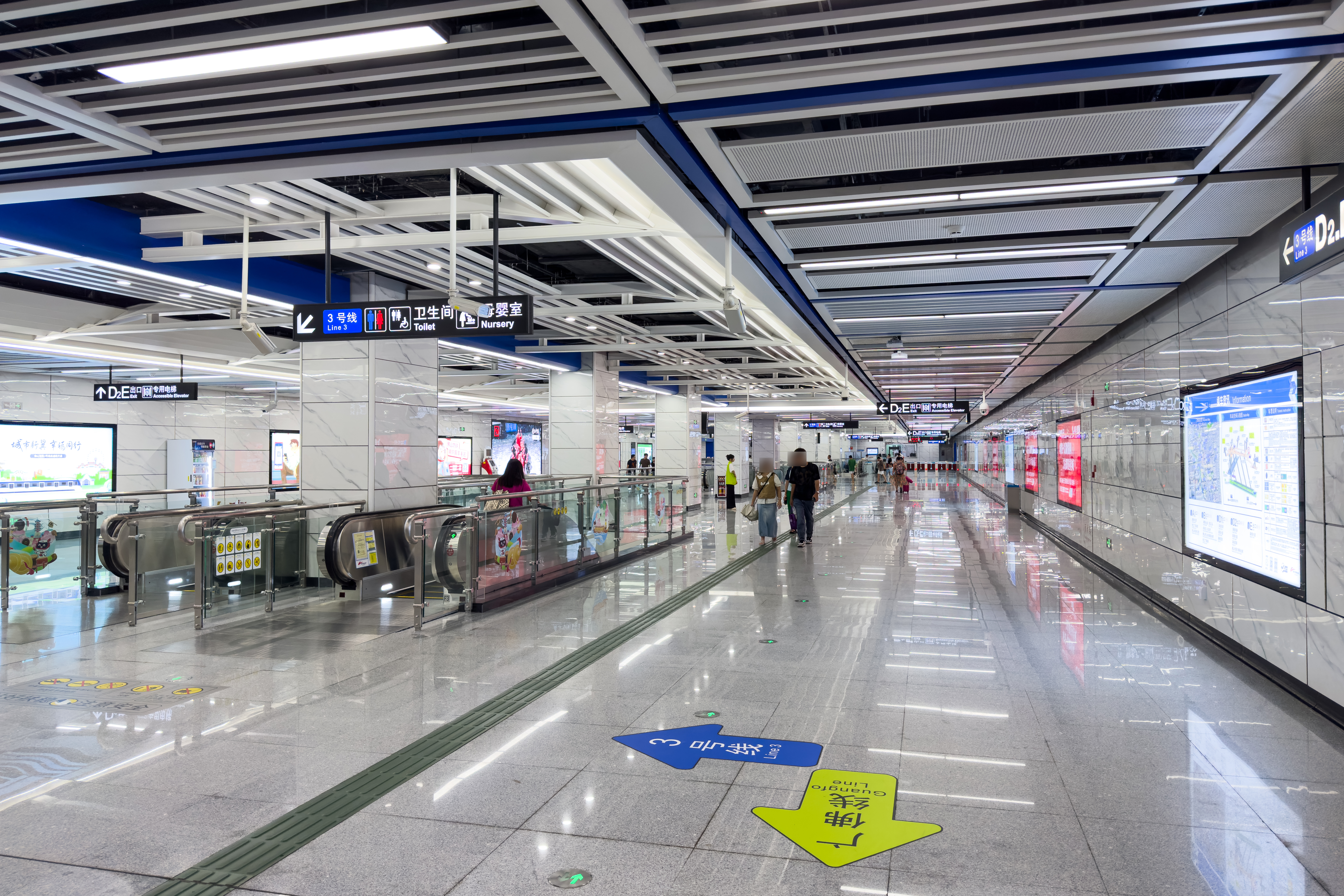
Line 3 concourse

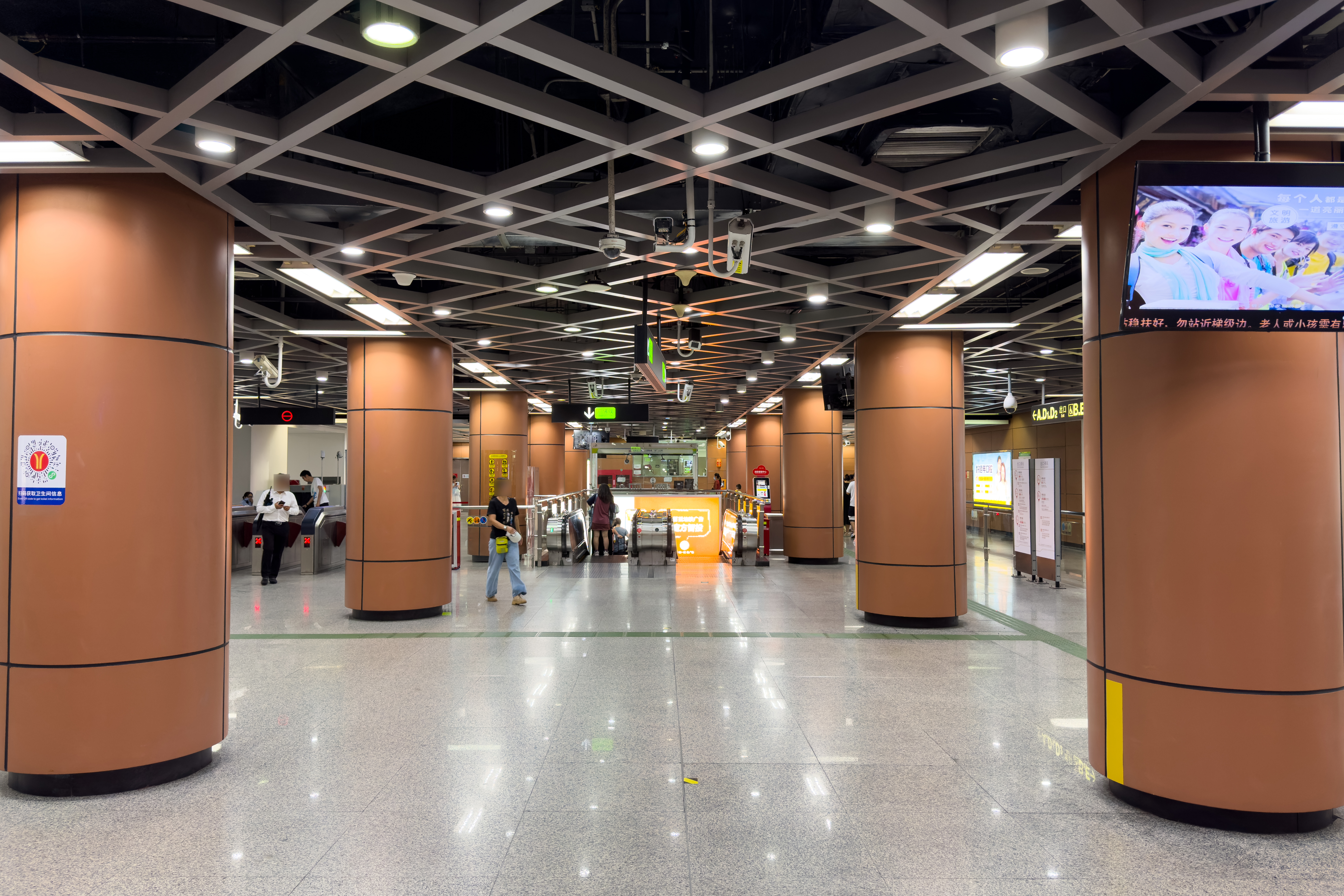
Guangfo line concourse

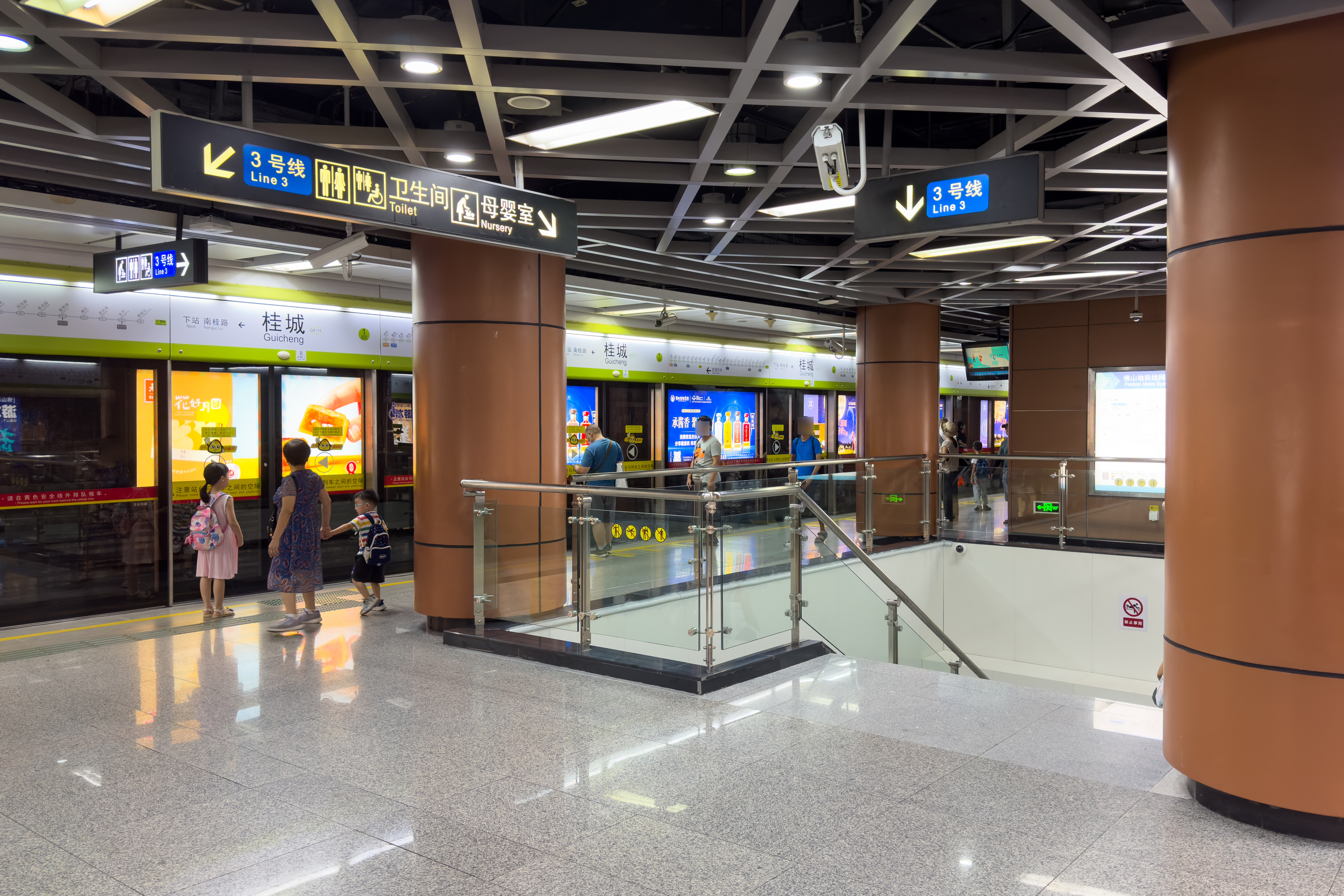
Transfer node entrance to Line 3 from Guangfo line platform

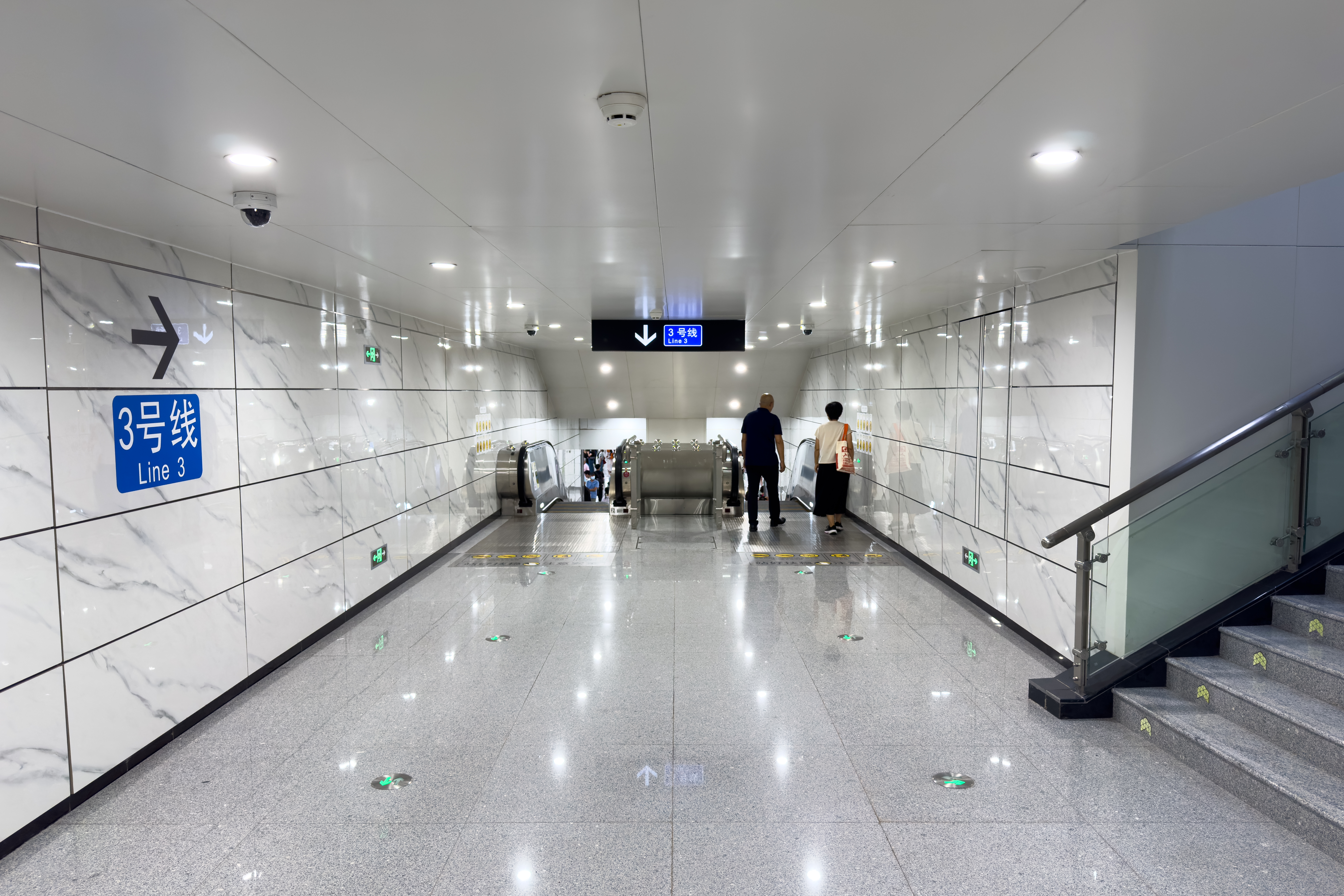
Transfer passageway (one-way only)

== History ==
In 2002, the direction of the Guangfo Metro was preliminarily determined, and the station was determined to be one of the intermediate stations in the Foshan section of the Guangfo Metro and there was also a transfer to the future planned Foshan Metro Line 3.

The station was the first to start construction on 28 June 2007. On 31 July 2008, the construction site of the station suddenly subsided, causing the wall of the station site to collapse about 40 meters, but fortunately there were no casualties.

On 28 and 29 October 2010, the station was opened to citizens in Guangzhou and Foshan for test rides along the initial section of the Guangfo Metro. At 14:00 on 3 November, the station opened with the opening of the Guangfo Metro.

The enclosure construction of the Line 3 station began at the end of May 2017, and the main structure topped out on 30 November 2019. The Guangfo Line station started the construction of the Line 3 access project in early 2023. On 23 August 2024, the station opened from the first train of Line 3.
