= Shunde Port station =

Future Foshan Metro Line 3 station

Shunde Port 顺德港

Chinese name
- Chinese: 顺德港站
Transcriptions
Standard Mandarin
- Hanyu Pinyin: Shùndé Gǎng Zhàn
Yue: Cantonese
- Yale Romanization: Seuhndāk Góng Jaahm
- Jyutping: Seon^{6}dak^{1} Gong^{2} Zaam^{6}

General information
- Location: Northwest side of East Nanguo Road (南国东路) and North Gangkou Road (港口北路), Daliang Subdistrict; Shunde District, Foshan, Guangdong; China
- Coordinates: 22°48′42.08″N 113°20′1.43″E
- Operator: Foshan Metro Operation Co., Ltd.
- Line: Line 3

Construction
- Structure type: Underground
- Accessible: Yes

Other information
- Status: Awaiting construction
- Station code: F301

History
- Opening: To be determined

Services
Preceding station	Foshan Metro	Following station
Future services
Shunde College Railway Station towards Foshan University	Line 3	Terminus
Location

Shunde Port station (Chinese: 顺德港站; pinyin: Shùndé Gǎng Zhàn; Cantonese Yale: Seuhndāk Góng Jaahm) is a planned future station on Line 3 of Foshan Metro, which will be located in Foshan's Shunde District near Shunde Port.

== History ==
In 2019, Line 3 was planned to extend from Shunde College Railway Station to the Shunde Port, known then as Shunde Passenger Port station. The adjustment plan was approved by the Guangdong Provincial Development and Reform Commission on 28 March 2019. In 2022, the station was renamed to Shunde Port station.

Since part of the station is located on the outside of an embankment, according to the requirements of the relevant water conservancy regulations, the station can only start construction after the completion of the adjustment of the embankment. As of 2024, the site is still in the preliminary planning stage, and the specific construction start time has not yet been determined.

== Station layout ==
The station will be located under East Nanguo Road.

== Exits ==
The station will have 2 exits, A and B, at its initial opening, located east and west of East Nanguo Road.
