= Diejiao station =

Foshan Metro Line 3 station

Diejiao 叠滘
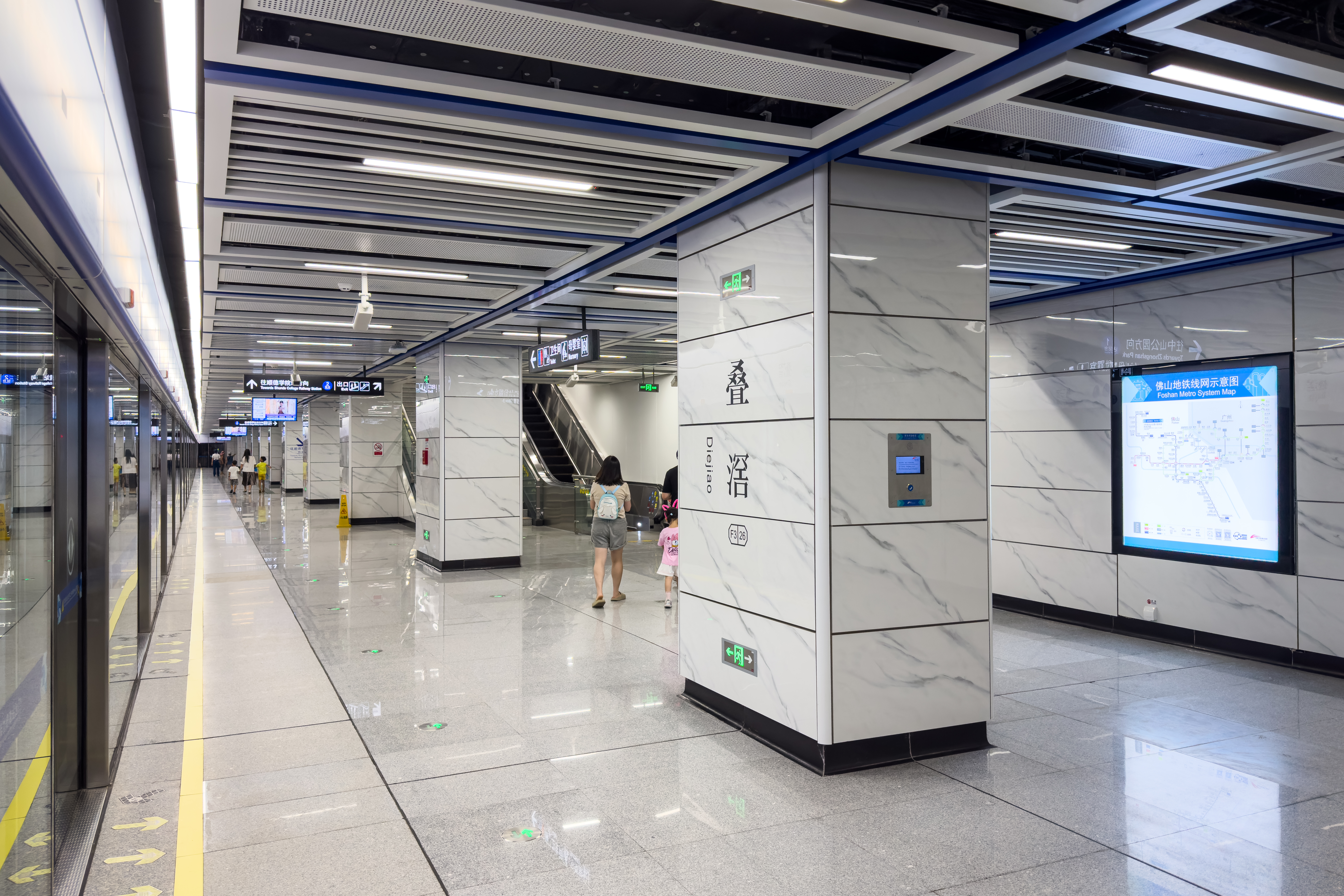
- Platform 1 (towards Foshan University)

Chinese name
- Chinese: 叠滘站
Transcriptions
Standard Mandarin
- Hanyu Pinyin: Diéjiào Zhàn
Yue: Cantonese
- Yale Romanization: Dihpgaau Jaahm
- Jyutping: Dip^{6}gaau^{3} Zaam^{6}

General information
- Location: Intersection of Diejiao Boulevard (叠滘大道) and Haisan Road (海三路), Guicheng Subdistrict; Nanhai District, Foshan, Guangdong; China
- Coordinates: 23°3′2.59″N 113°7′19.49″E
- Operator: Foshan Metro Operation Co., Ltd.
- Line: Line 3
- Platforms: 2 (2 stacked side platforms)
- Tracks: 2

Construction
- Structure type: Underground
- Platform levels: 2
- Accessible: Yes

Other information
- Station code: F326

History
- Opened: 23 August 2024 (23 months ago)

Services
Preceding station	Foshan Metro	Following station
Zhongshan Park towards Foshan University	Line 3	Xiyue towards Shunde College Railway Station
Location

Diejiao station (Chinese: 叠滘站; pinyin: Diéjiào Zhàn; Cantonese Yale: Dihpgaau Jaahm) is a station on Line 3 of Foshan Metro, located in Foshan's Nanhai District. It opened on 23 August 2024.

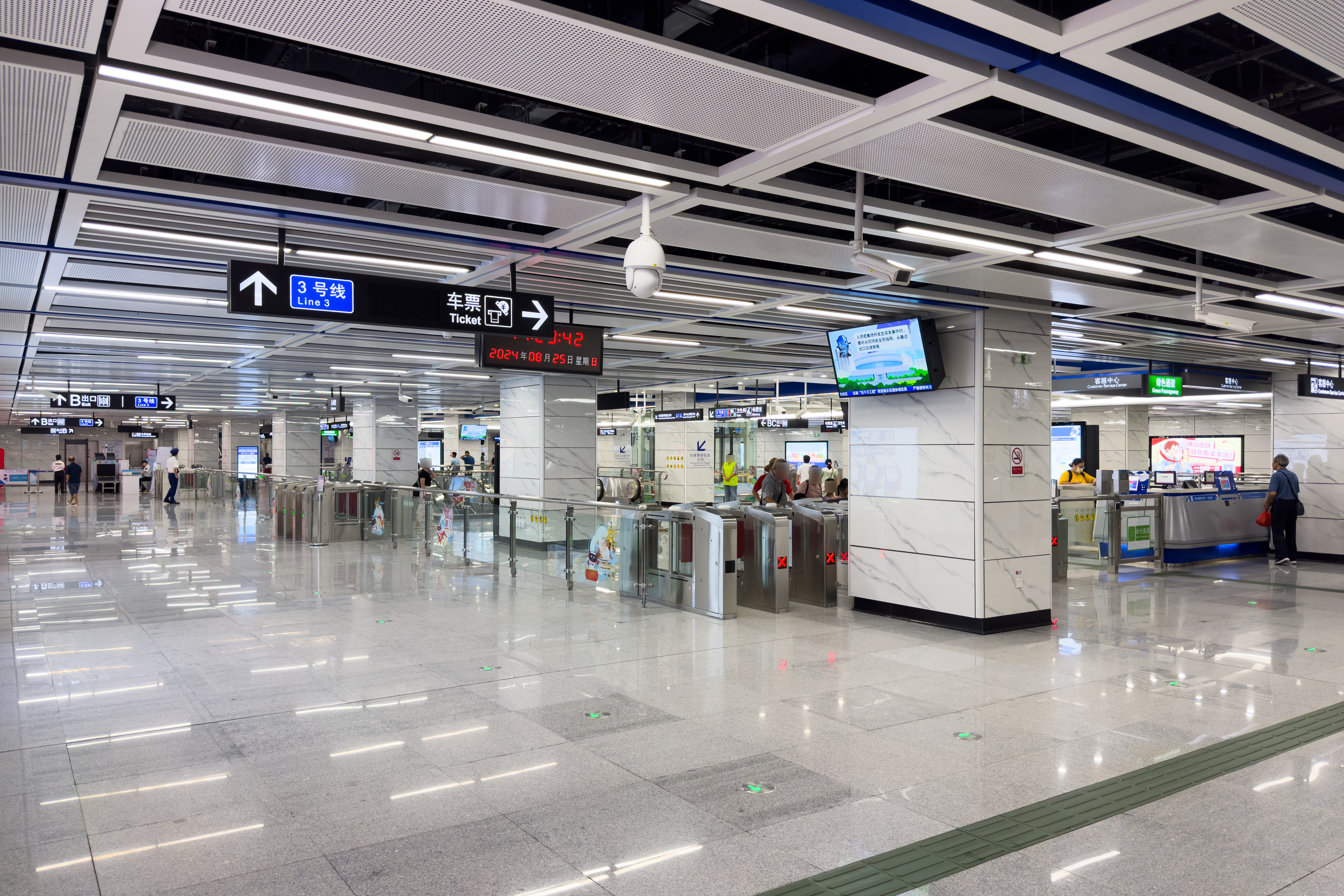
Concourse

== Station layout ==
The station has 2 stacked side platforms under Haisan Road. Due to the narrow road of Haisan Road and the large number of residences and shops on both sides of the road, in order to ensure the safe distance between the metro station and the buildings on both sides, and at the same time reduce the large number of demolitions of houses on both sides, the line was laid in a stacked manner, and the station was set up as a three-storey underground stacked station. It is the first station in Foshan to feature a stacked platform configuration.

G	-	Exits B & C
L1; Concourse	Lobby	Ticket Machines, Customer Service, Shops, Police Station, Security Facilities
L2; Platforms	Side platform, doors will open on the right
L2; Platforms	Platform 1	3 towards Foshan University (Zhongshan Park)
L3; Platforms	Side platform, doors will open on the left
L3; Platforms	Platform 2	3 towards Shunde College Railway Station (Xiyue)

=== Entrances/exits ===
The station has 2 points of entry/exit, lettered B and C, located on the east and west sides of North Wenhua Road. Exit B is equipped with an elevator.

- B: Haisan Road
- C: Wenchang Road, Foshan No.1 High School
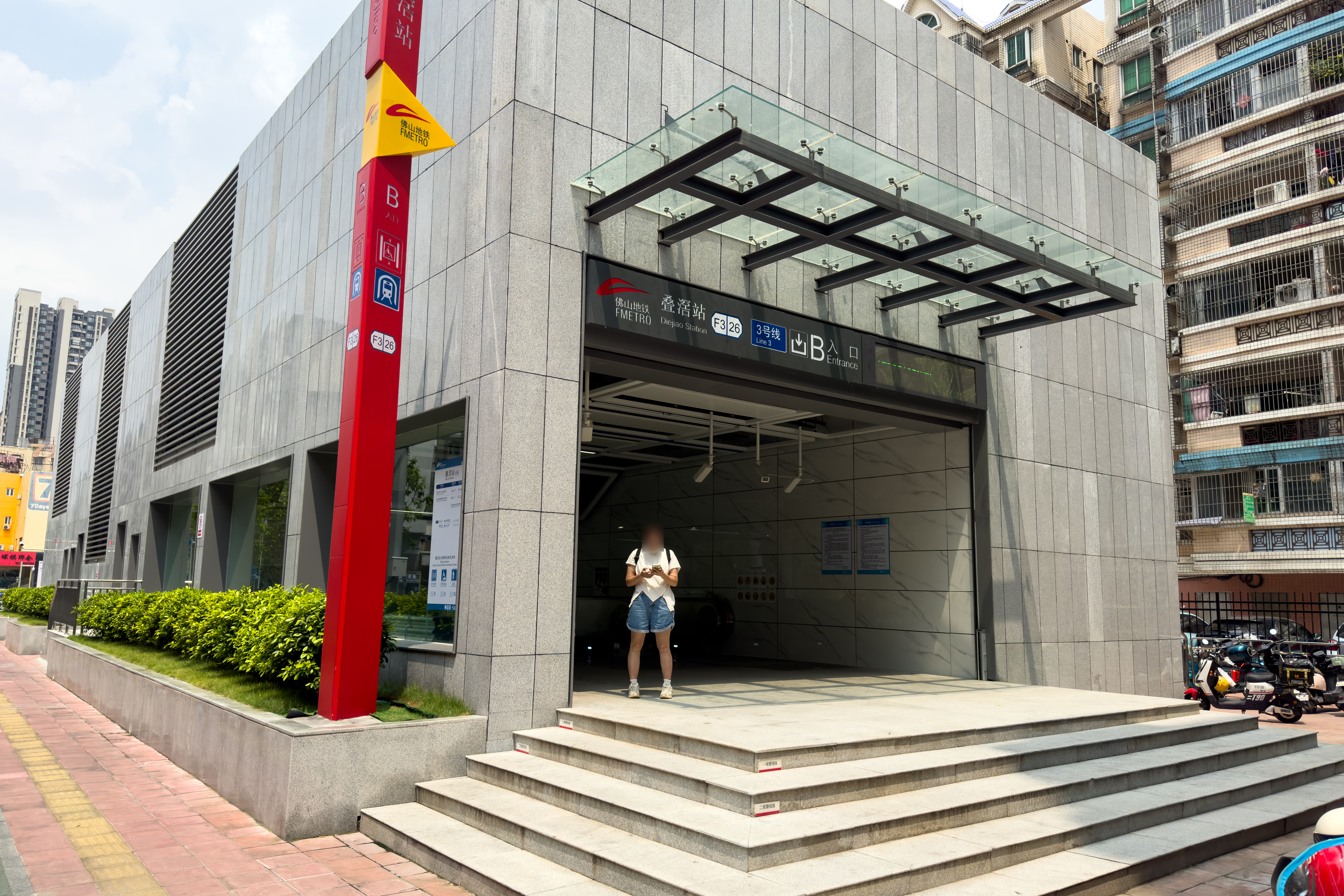
Entrance B

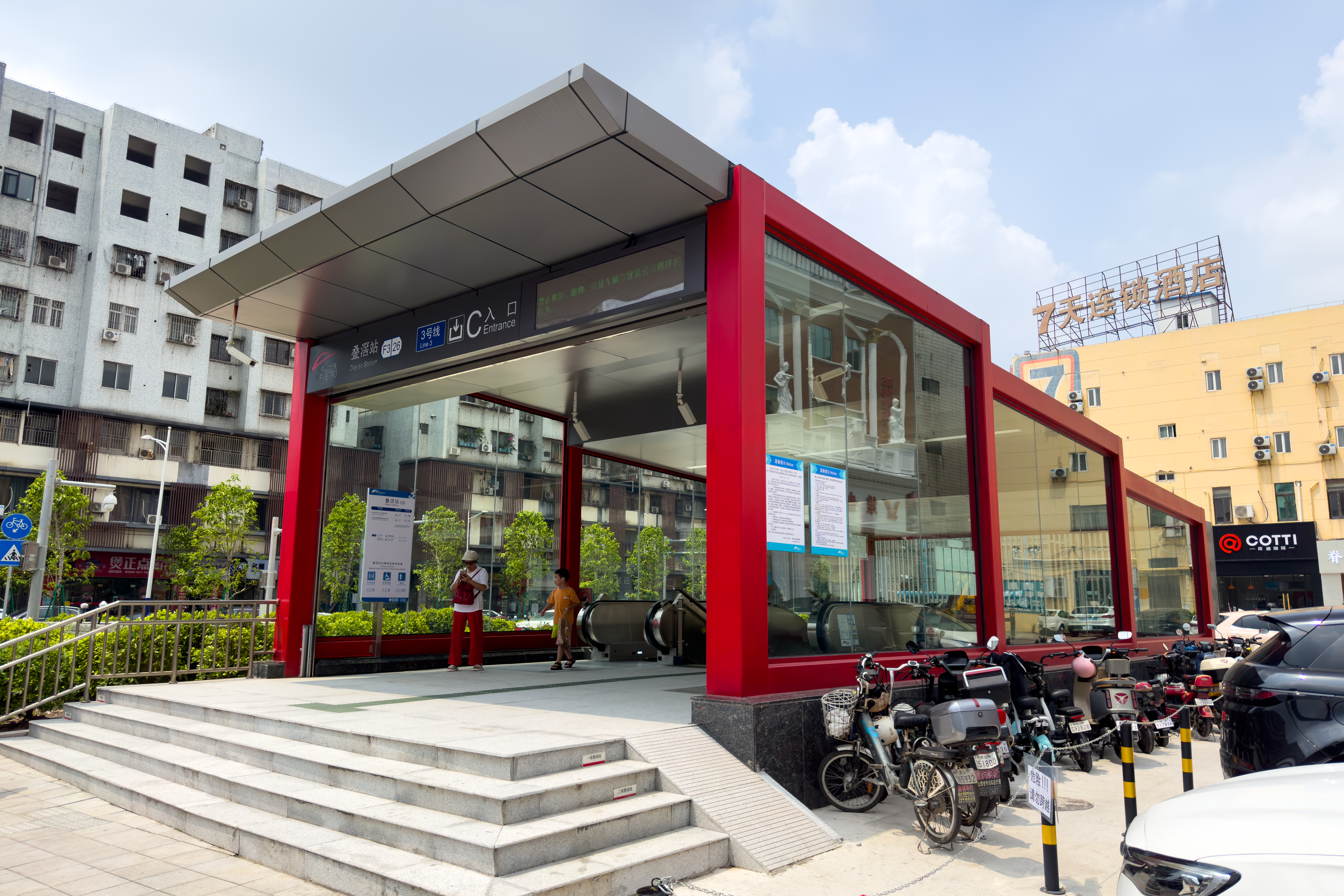
Entrance C

== History ==
The site began enclosure construction on 27 October 2017. On 28 September 2022, the main structure successfully topped out.

The station opened on 23 August 2024 as part of the section from "Zhen'an to Zhongshan Park". (Note: Prior to opening, it was known as part of the 'rear section' or 'section under construction')

== Future development ==
The station is planned to have an interchange with Guangzhou Metro Line 28 (Fosuiguan Intercity), but there was no reservation constructed as part of the Line 3 station.
