= Line 3 (Foshan Metro) =

Metro line in Foshan, China

- 3
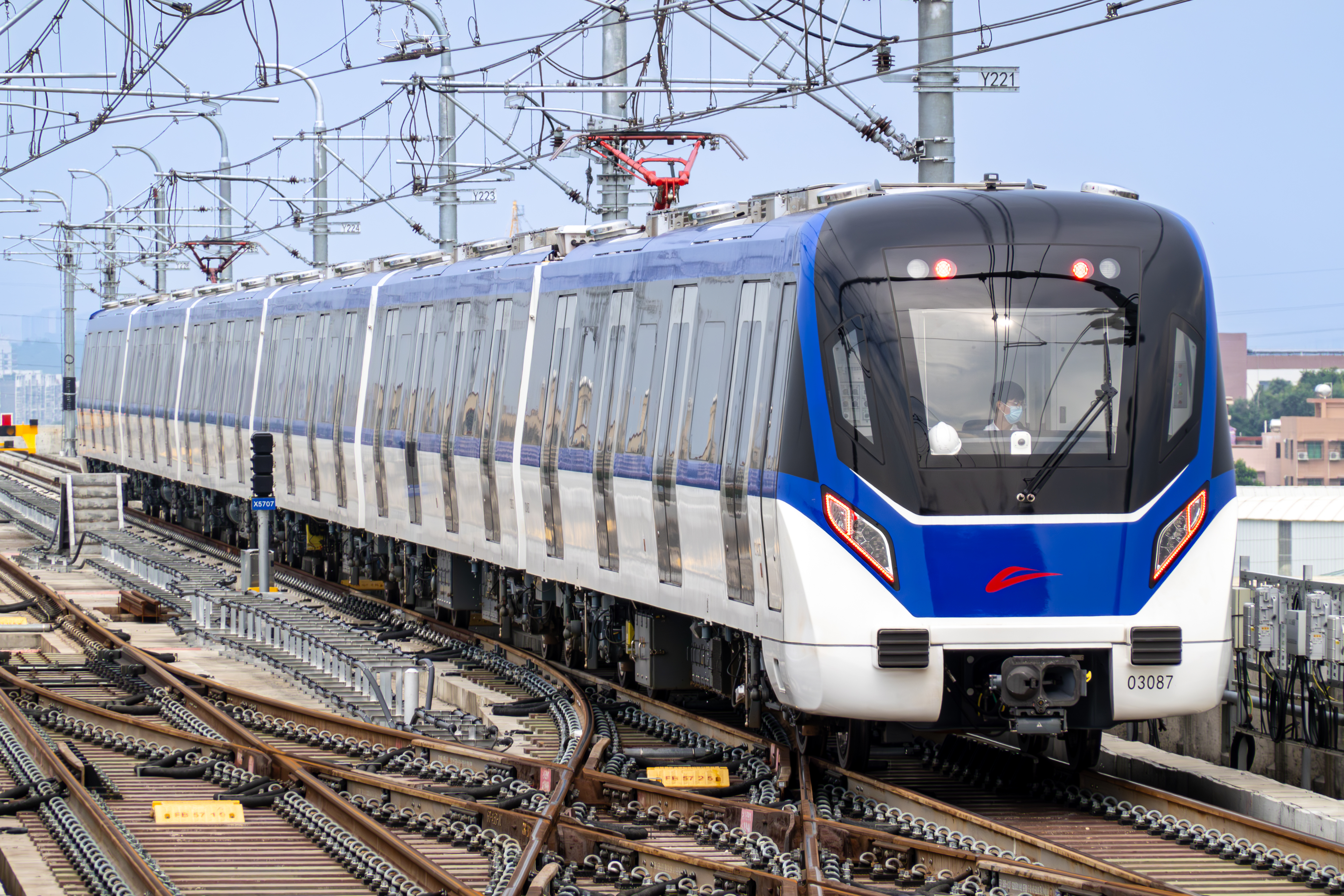
- Line 3 train near Foshan University

Overview
- Other name(s): M3 (FS 2011 plan name); East-West line (Chinese: 东西贯穿线)
- Status: In operation
- Owner: Foshan Urban Rail Transit Line 3 Development Co., Ltd.
- Locale: Foshan (Nanhai, Shunde and Chancheng districts); Guangdong
- Termini: Shunde College Railway Station (Future: Shunde Port); Foshan University
- Stations: 37 (operational); 1 (planned); 38 (total)

Service
- Type: Rapid transit
- System: Foshan Metro
- Services: 1
- Operator: Foshan Metro Operation Co., Ltd.

History
- Opened: 28 December 2022; 3 years ago

Technical
- Line length: 66.09 km (41.07 mi) (in operation); 2.88 km (1.79 mi) (planned); 69.5 km (43.2 mi) (total)
- Number of tracks: 2
- Character: Underground and elevated
- Track gauge: 1,435 mm (4 ft 8 1/2 in)
- Electrification: 1,500 V DC (Overhead lines)
- Operating speed: 90 km/h (56 mph)

Line 3
- Simplified Chinese: 佛山地铁3号线
- Traditional Chinese: 佛山地鐵3號線
Transcriptions
Standard Mandarin
- Hanyu Pinyin: Fóshān Dìtiě Sān Hào Xiàn
Yue: Cantonese
- Jyutping: fat6 saan1 dei6 tit3 saam1 hou6 sin3

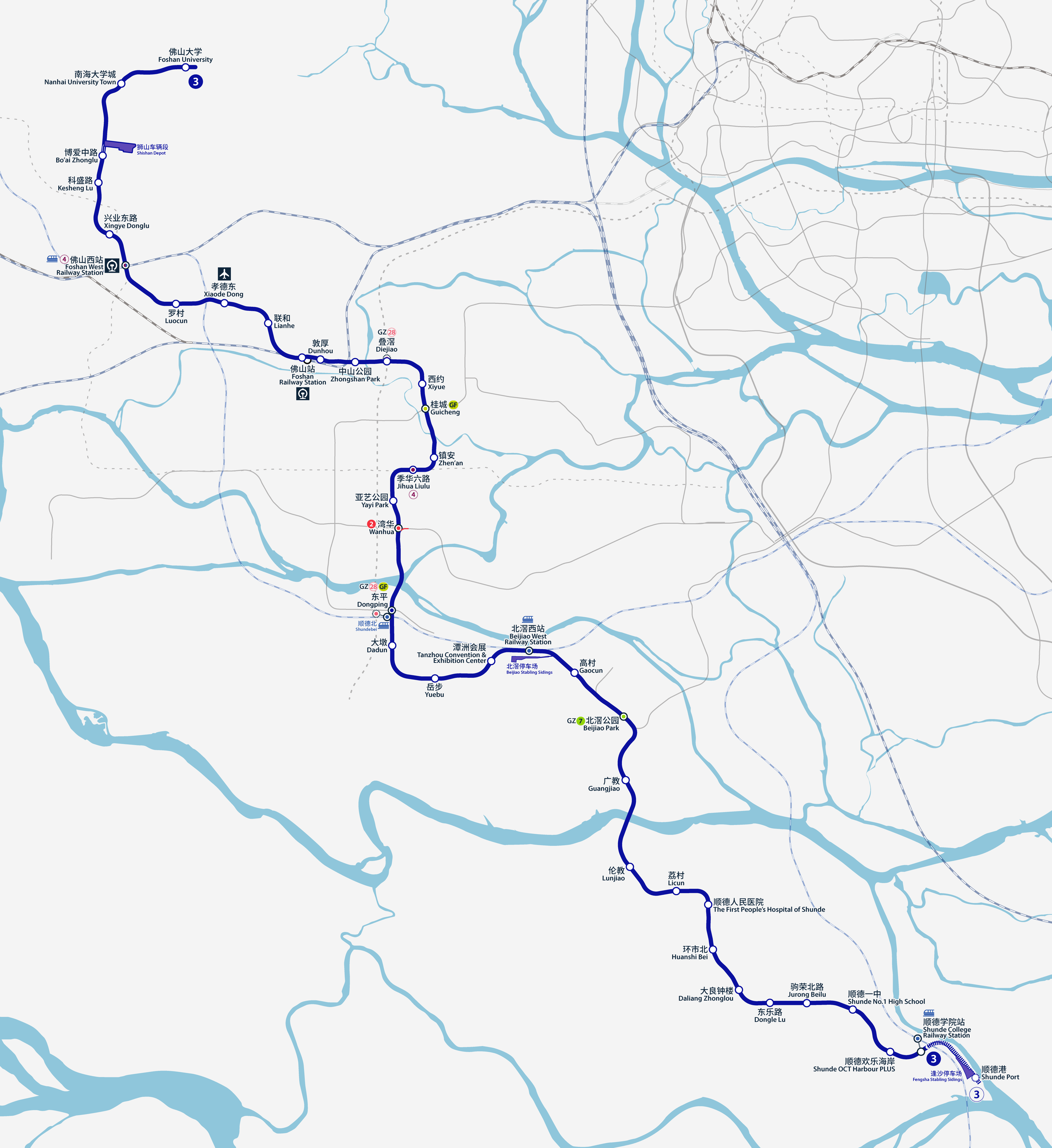
Map of Line 3 drawn to scale.

Line 3 of Foshan Metro (FMetro) (Chinese: 佛山地铁3号线; pinyin: Fóshān Dìtiě Sān Hào Xiàn) is a metro line in Foshan that runs 66.09 km (41.07 mi) between Shunde College Railway Station in Shunde District and Foshan University in Nanhai District. The initial section between Shunde College Railway Station and Zhen'an opened on 28 December 2022, and the rear section between Zhen'an and Zhongshan Park (south section) and between Lianhe and Foshan University (north section) opened on 23 August 2024. The full line will run from Shunde Port in Shunde District to Foshan University in Nanhai District. The line was fully connected for full operation between the north and south sections with the opening of the remaining section between Zhongshan Park and Lianhe on 18 June 2026. Foshan Railway Station, which is located within this section, opened on 1 July 2026.

== Opening timeline ==
Segment	Commencement	Length	Station(s)	Name
Shunde College Railway Station — Zhen'an	28 December 2022	39.96 km (24.83 mi)	22	Initial section
Zhen'an — Zhongshan Park	23 August 2024	5.78 km (3.59 mi)	4	Rear section (South section)
Lianhe — Foshan University	23 August 2024	16.38 km (10.18 mi)	9	Rear section (North section)
Zhongshan Park — Lianhe	18 June 2026	3.97 km (2.47 mi)	1	Remaining section
Foshan Railway Station	1 July 2026	Infill station	1	Remaining section

== Stations ==
Station №	Station name		Connections	Future Connections	Location
Station №	English	Chinese	Connections	Future Connections	Location
F301	Shunde Port (Note: Planned station, construction not yet started)	顺德港			Shunde
F302	Shunde College Railway Station	顺德学院站	OJQ Guangzhu		Shunde
F303	Shunde OCT Harbour PLUS	顺德欢乐海岸			Shunde
F304	Shunde No.1 High School	顺德一中			Shunde
F305	Jurong Beilu	驹荣北路			Shunde
F306	Dongle Lu	东乐路		11	Shunde
F307	Daliang Zhonglou	大良钟楼			Shunde
F308	Huanshi Bei	环市北			Shunde
F309	The First People's Hospital of Shunde	顺德人民医院			Shunde
F310	Licun	荔村			Shunde
F311	Lunjiao	伦教			Shunde
F312	Guangjiao	广教			Shunde
F313	Beijiao Park	北滘公园	7 701-7		Shunde
F314	Gaocun	高村			Shunde
F315	Beijiao West Railway Station	北滘西站	BJA Guangzhao		Shunde
F316	Tanzhou Convention & Exhibition Center	潭洲会展			Shunde
F317	Yuebu	岳步			Shunde
F318	Dadun	大墩			Shunde
F319	Dongping	东平	Guangfo GF02; SVA Guangzhao		Shunde
F320	Wanhua	湾华	2 F220		Chancheng
F321	Yayi Park	亚艺公园			Chancheng
F322	Jihua Liulu	季华六路		4	Chancheng
F323	Zhen'an	镇安			Chancheng
F324	Guicheng	桂城	Guangfo GF11		Nanhai
F325	Xiyue	西约			Nanhai
F326	Diejiao	叠滘			Nanhai
F327	Zhongshan Park	中山公园			Chancheng
F328	Dunhou	敦厚			Chancheng
F329	Foshan Railway Station	佛山站	FSQ		Chancheng
F330	Lianhe	联和			Nanhai
F331	Xiaode Dong	孝德东	FUO		Nanhai
F332	Luocun	罗村			Nanhai
F333	Foshan West Railway Station	佛山西站	FOQ Guangzhao	4	Nanhai
F334	Xingye Donglu	兴业东路			Nanhai
F335	Kesheng Lu	科盛路			Nanhai
F336	Bo'ai Zhonglu	博爱中路			Nanhai
F337	Nanhai University Town	南海大学城			Nanhai
F338	Foshan University	佛山大学			Nanhai
