= Nangui Lu station =

Guangfo Metro station in Foshan

Coordinates: 23.03413°N 113.15412°E

Nangui Lu 南桂路
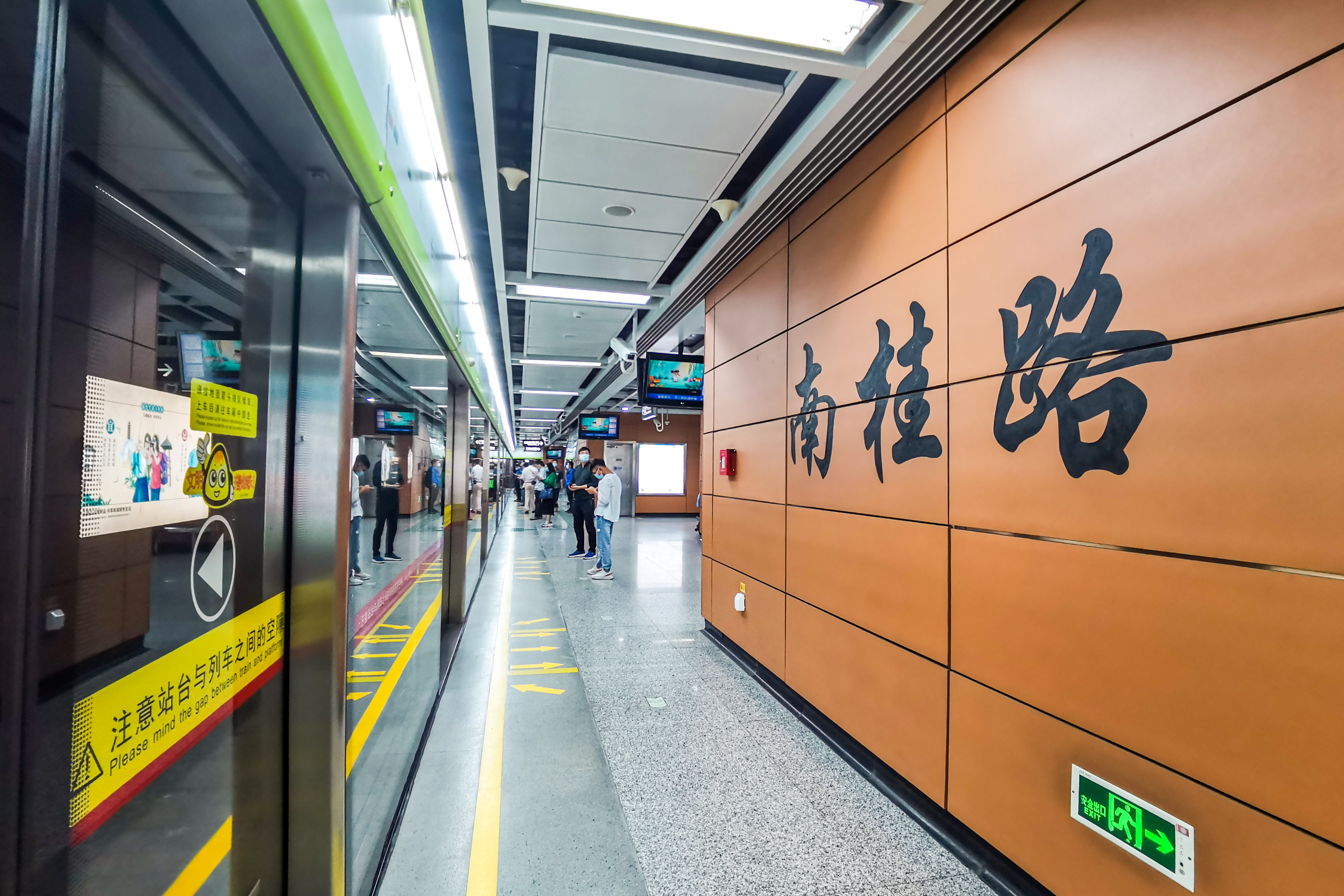

General information
- Location: Nanhai District, Foshan, Guangdong; China
- Operated by: Foshan Railway Investment Construction Group Co. Ltd. Guangzhou Metro Co. Ltd.
- Line: Guangfo line
- Platforms: 2 (1 island platform)

Construction
- Structure type: Underground

Other information
- Station code: GF12

History
- Opened: 3 November 2010; 15 years ago

Services
Preceding station	Foshan Metro	Following station
Guicheng towards Xincheng Dong	Guangfo Line	Leigang towards Lijiao
Location

Nangui Lu Station (Chinese: 南桂路站; pinyin: Nánguì Lù Zhàn; Jyutping: naam^{4}gwai^{3} lou^{6} zaam^{6}) is a metro station on the Guangfo Line (FMetro Line 1) and will be an interchange station between the Guangfo Line (FMetro Line 1) and FMetro Line 6. It is located under the junction of Guilan Road (桂澜路), Nangui East Road (南桂东路) and Guiping Road (桂平路) in Guicheng Subdistrict in the Nanhai District of Foshan. The station is situated in the commercial area of the Nanhai District and was completed on 3 November 2010.

== Station layout ==
G	-	Exits
L1; Concourse	Lobby	Customer Service, Shops, Vending machines, ATMs
L2; Platforms	Platform 2	Guangfo towards Xincheng Dong (Guicheng)
L2; Platforms	Island platform, doors will open on the left
L2; Platforms	Platform 1	Guangfo towards Lijiao (Leigang)

== Exits ==
Exit number	Exit location
Exit A	Nangui Donglu
Exit B	Guilan Lu
