= Rongqi Port =

Cargo port in Foshan, China

Coordinates: 22°46′49″N 113°17′14″E

Rongqi Port (Chinese: 容奇港) is a cargo port in Shunde, Foshan, Guangdong, China. It is located at Banshawei (Chinese: 板沙尾), Desheng River (Chinese: 德胜河) in Daliang, Shunde.

The port was approved by the State Council of China in 1986 and started service in 1987. In 1998, its passenger service was relocated to Shunde Port, but its cargo service is still in use as of 2026.
