= Shunde Port =

Port in Shunde, Foshan, China

Coordinates: 22.8053°N 113.3404°E

Shunde Port (Chinese: 顺德港) is a passenger port in Shunde, Foshan, Guangdong, China. It is located at the right side of Wusha Bridge (Chinese: 五沙大桥) in Daliang, Shunde. It provides daily passenger vessel service between Shunde and Hong Kong.

The port started service in 1998 when the passenger port of the nearby Rongqi Port was relocated there.
