= Zhongshan Park station (Foshan Metro) =

Foshan Metro Line 3 station

Zhongshan Park 中山公园
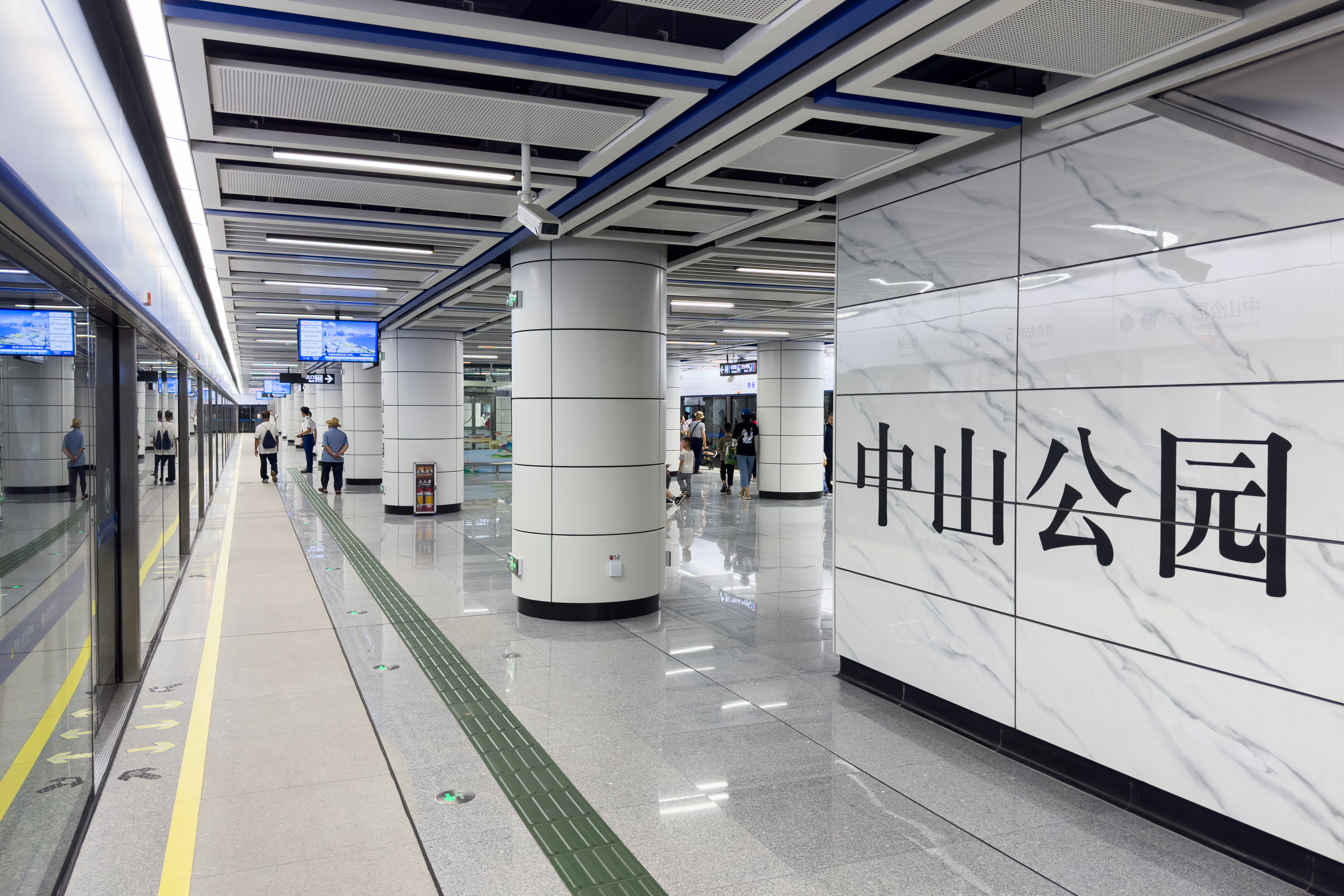
- Platform

Chinese name
- Simplified Chinese: 中山公园站
- Traditional Chinese: 中山公園站
Transcriptions
Standard Mandarin
- Hanyu Pinyin: Zhōngshān Gōngyuán Zhàn
Yue: Cantonese
- Yale Romanization: Jūngsāan Gūng'yún Jaahm
- Jyutping: Zung^{1}saan^{1}gung^{1}jyun^{4} Zaam^{6}

General information
- Location: Intersection of Wenchang Road (文昌路) and Huozhan Road (货站路); Chancheng District, Foshan, Guangdong; China
- Coordinates: 23°3′1.40″N 113°6′38.66″E
- Operator: Foshan Metro Operation Co., Ltd.
- Line: Line 3
- Platforms: 2 (1 island platform)
- Tracks: 2

Construction
- Structure type: Underground
- Accessible: Yes

Other information
- Station code: F327

History
- Opened: 23 August 2024 (23 months ago)

Services
Preceding station	Foshan Metro	Following station
Dunhou towards Foshan University	Line 3	Diejiao towards Shunde College Railway Station
Location

Zhongshan Park station (simplified Chinese: 中山公园站; traditional Chinese: 中山公園站; pinyin: Zhōngshān Gōngyuán Zhàn; Cantonese Yale: Jūngsāan Gūng'yún Jaahm) is a station on Line 3 of Foshan Metro, located in Foshan's Chancheng District. It opened on 23 August 2024.

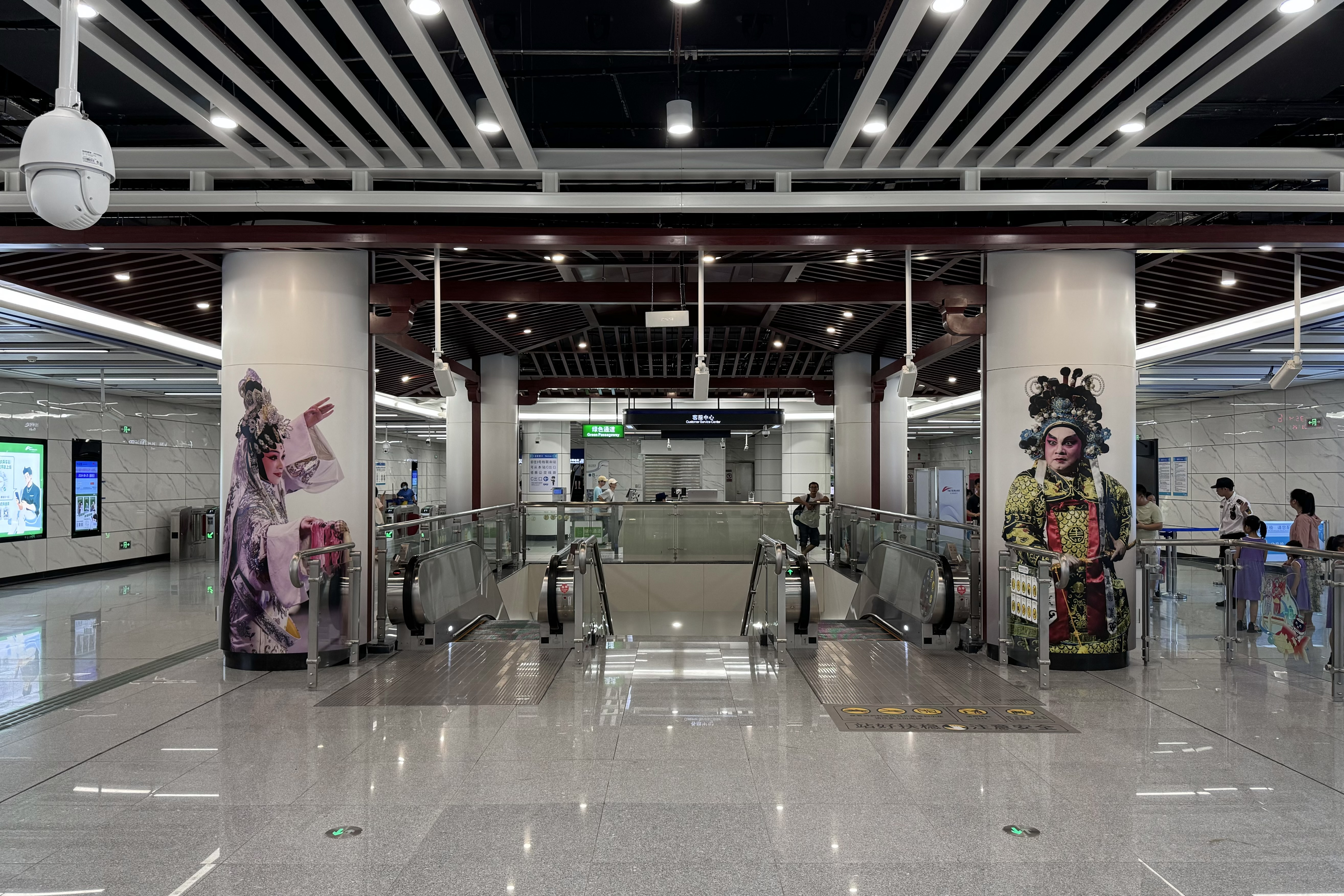
Concourse

== Theme ==
This station is one of the featured stations of the rear section of Line 3, with the theme of Cantonese opera and the design elements of the Ancestral Temple Qionghua Hall to showcase the history and culture of Foshan.

== Station layout ==
The station has an island platform under Wenchang Road.

G	-	Exits B-D
L1; Concourse	Lobby	Ticket Machines, Customer Service, Shops, Police Station, Security Facilities
L2; Platforms	Platform 1	3 towards Foshan University (Dunhou)
L2; Platforms	Island platform, doors will open on the left
L2; Platforms	Platform 2	3 towards Shunde College Railway Station (Diejiao)
L3; Reserved Platforms		Reserved track area
L3; Reserved Platforms	Reserved Island platform
L3; Reserved Platforms		Reserved track area

=== Entrances/exits ===
There are 3 points of entry/exit, located on the north and south sides of Wenchang Road. Exits B and C are equipped with elevators.

- B: Wenchang Road, Zhongshan Park
- C: Wenchang Road
- D: Wenchang West Road
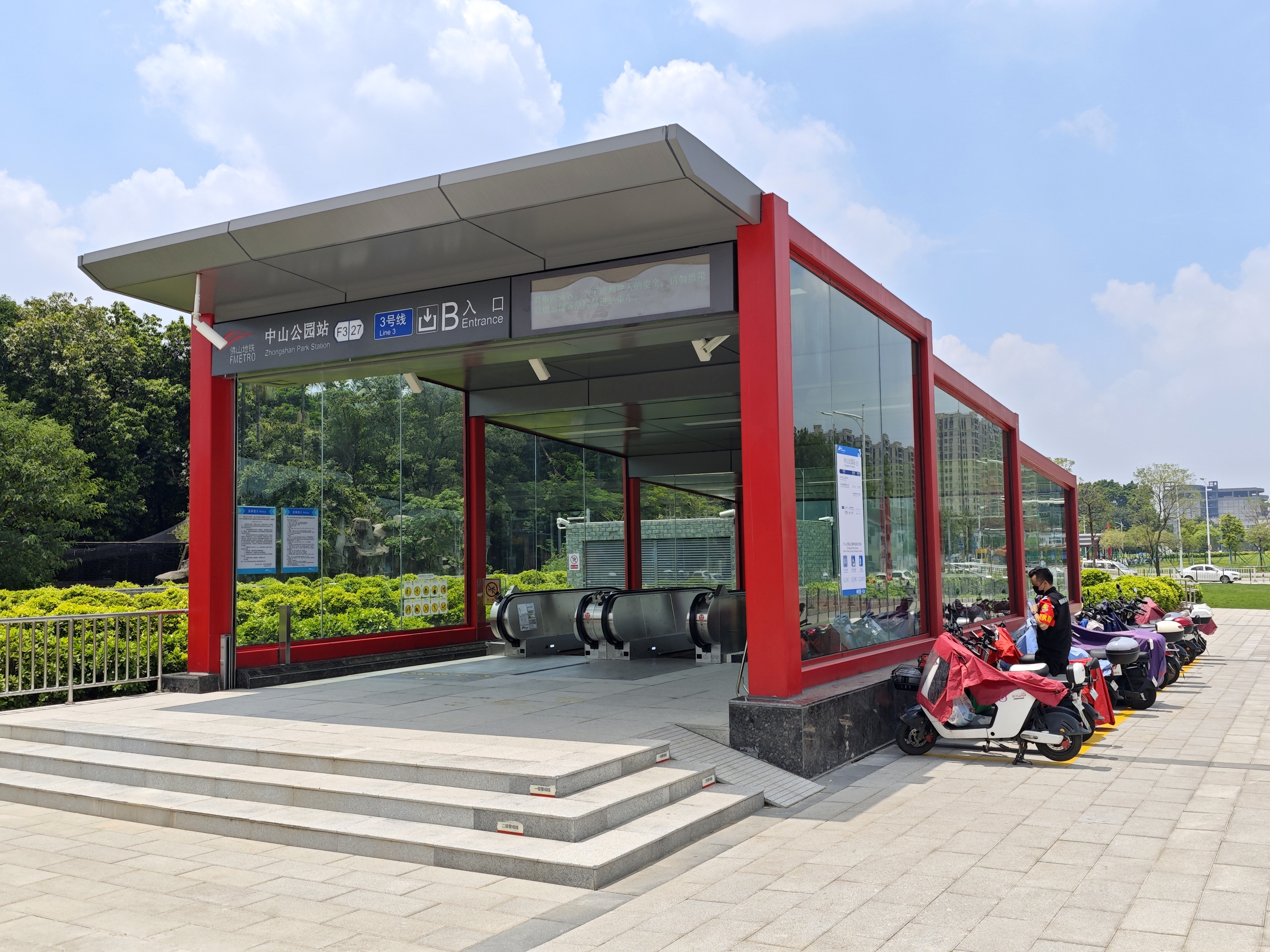
Entrance B

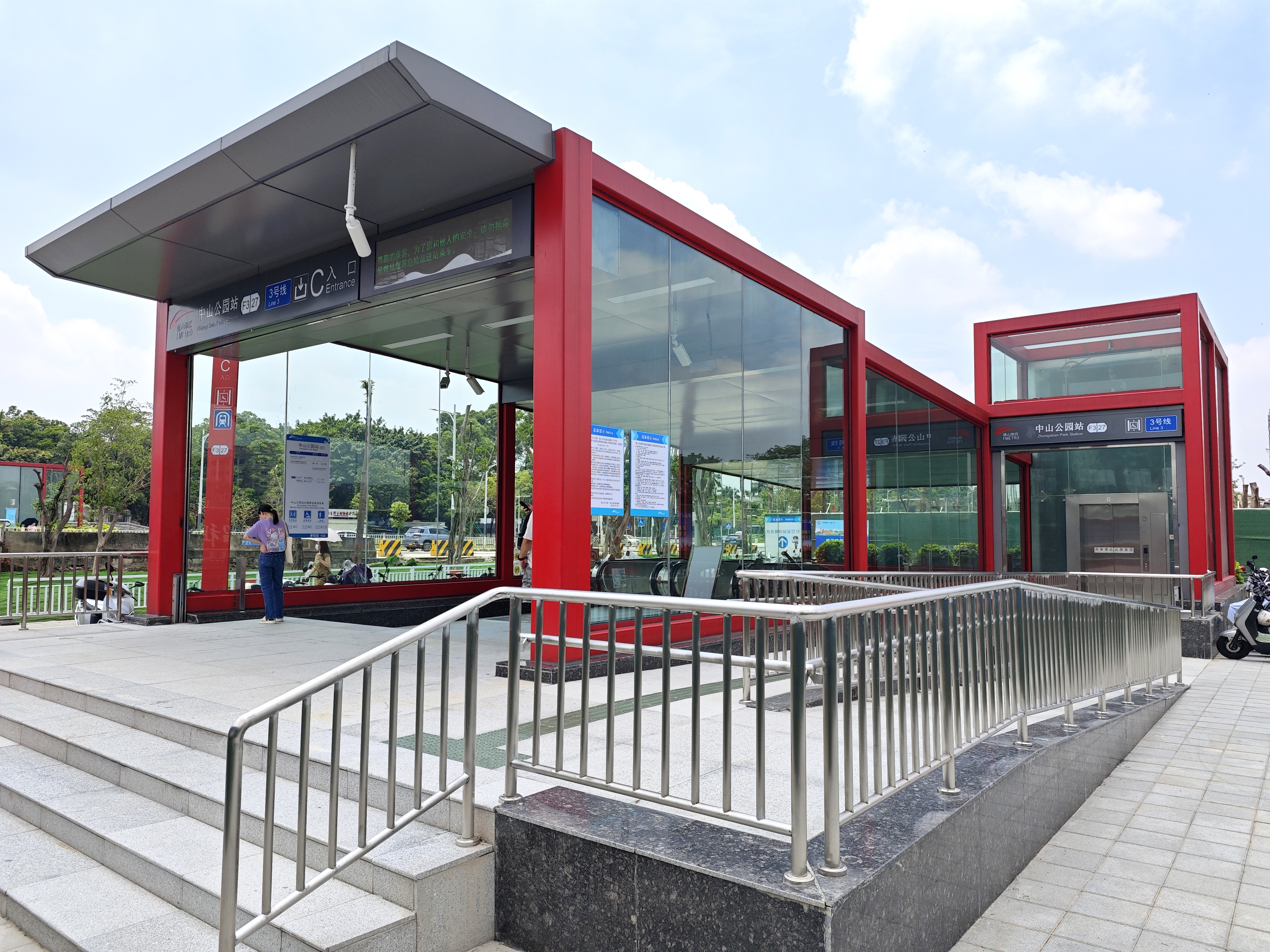
Entrance C

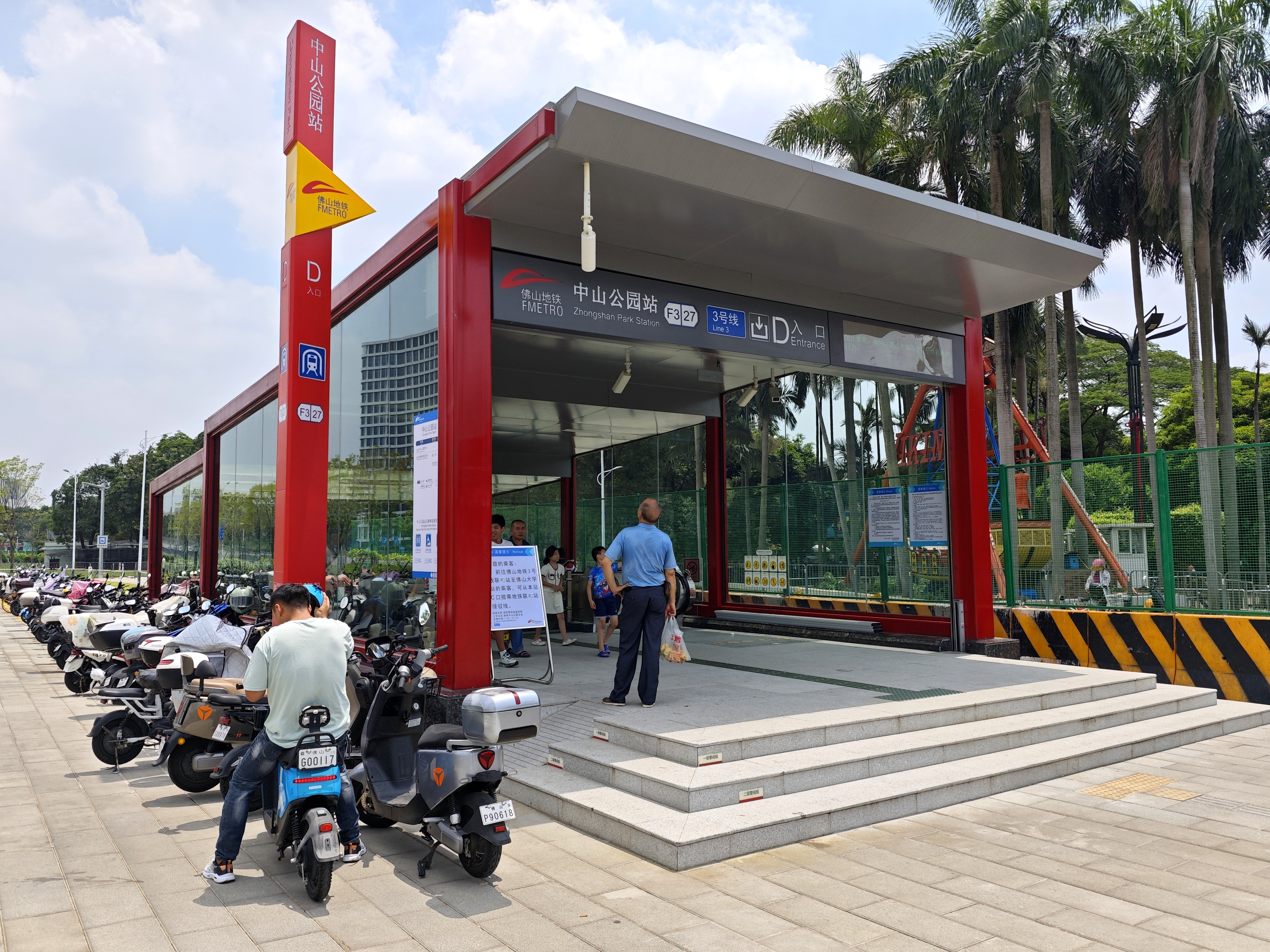
Entrance D

== History ==
When Line 3 was approved in 2012, this station was not included. In 2015, the planning of Line 3 was changed, and this station was added to the line. In the end, the construction of this station was implemented. The site began enclosure construction on 9 August 2017. On 23 July 2020, the base slab was sealed. On 17 October 2020, the main structure topped out.

The station opened on 23 August 2024 as part of the section from "Zhen'an to Zhongshan Park". (Note: Prior to opening, it was known as part of the 'rear section' or 'section under construction')

In addition, the station also has a transfer node and a reserved island platform structure. The reserved part was originally planned to be used by Line 7, but since the current plan of Line 7 has been changed to pass through Foshan Railway Station, and no longer has a stop at this station, it is still unknown whether the reserved part can be used again in the future.
