= Zhen'an station (Foshan Metro) =

Foshan Metro Line 3 station

Zhen'an 镇安
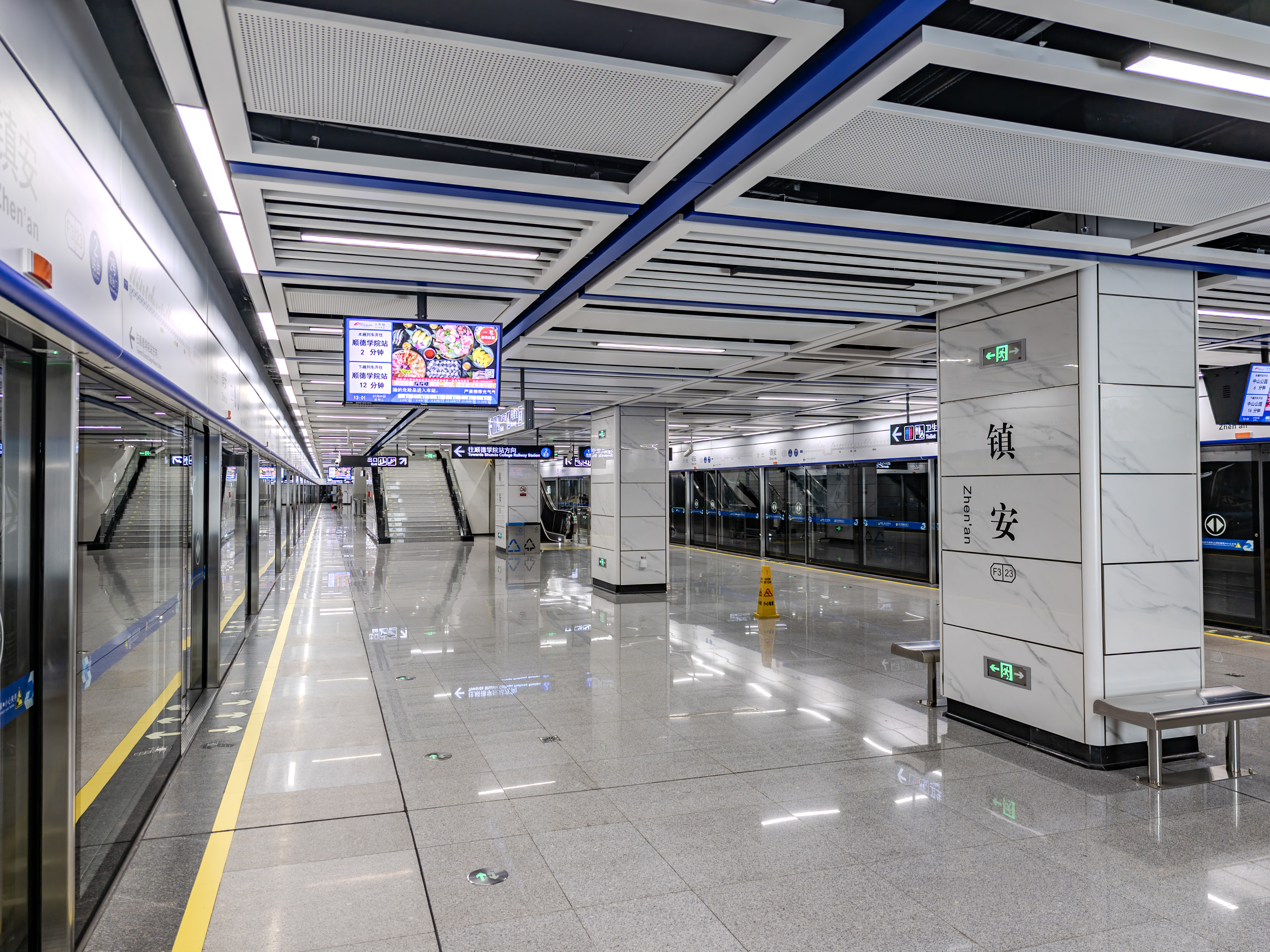
- Platform

Chinese name
- Simplified Chinese: 镇安站
- Traditional Chinese: 鎮安站
Transcriptions
Standard Mandarin
- Hanyu Pinyin: Zhèn'ān Zhàn
Yue: Cantonese
- Yale Romanization: Jan'ōn Jaahm
- Jyutping: Zan^{3}on^{1} Zaam^{6}

General information
- Location: South side of the intersection of Nanhai Boulevard (南海大道) and Tongji East Road (同济东路), Zumiao Subdistrict; Chancheng District, Foshan, Guangdong; China
- Coordinates: 23°1′7.57″N 113°8′20.08″E
- Operator: Foshan Metro Operation Co., Ltd.
- Line: Line 3
- Platforms: 2 (1 island platform)
- Tracks: 2

Construction
- Structure type: Underground
- Accessible: Yes

Other information
- Station code: F323

History
- Opened: 28 December 2022 (3 years ago)

Services
Preceding station	Foshan Metro	Following station
Guicheng towards Foshan University	Line 3	Jihua Liulu towards Shunde College Railway Station
Location

Zhen'an station (simplified Chinese: 镇安站; traditional Chinese: 鎮安站; pinyin: Zhèn'ān Zhàn; Cantonese Yale: Jan'ōn Jaahm) is a station on Line 3 of Foshan Metro, located in Foshan's Chancheng District. It opened on 28 December 2022, and was the northern terminus of the line until it extended north to Zhongshan Park on 23 August 2024.

A double storage line is set up at the north end of the station, which can be used for daily train storage, and can also be used for turnback of all trains from the initial section to before the opening of the southern section of the rear section.

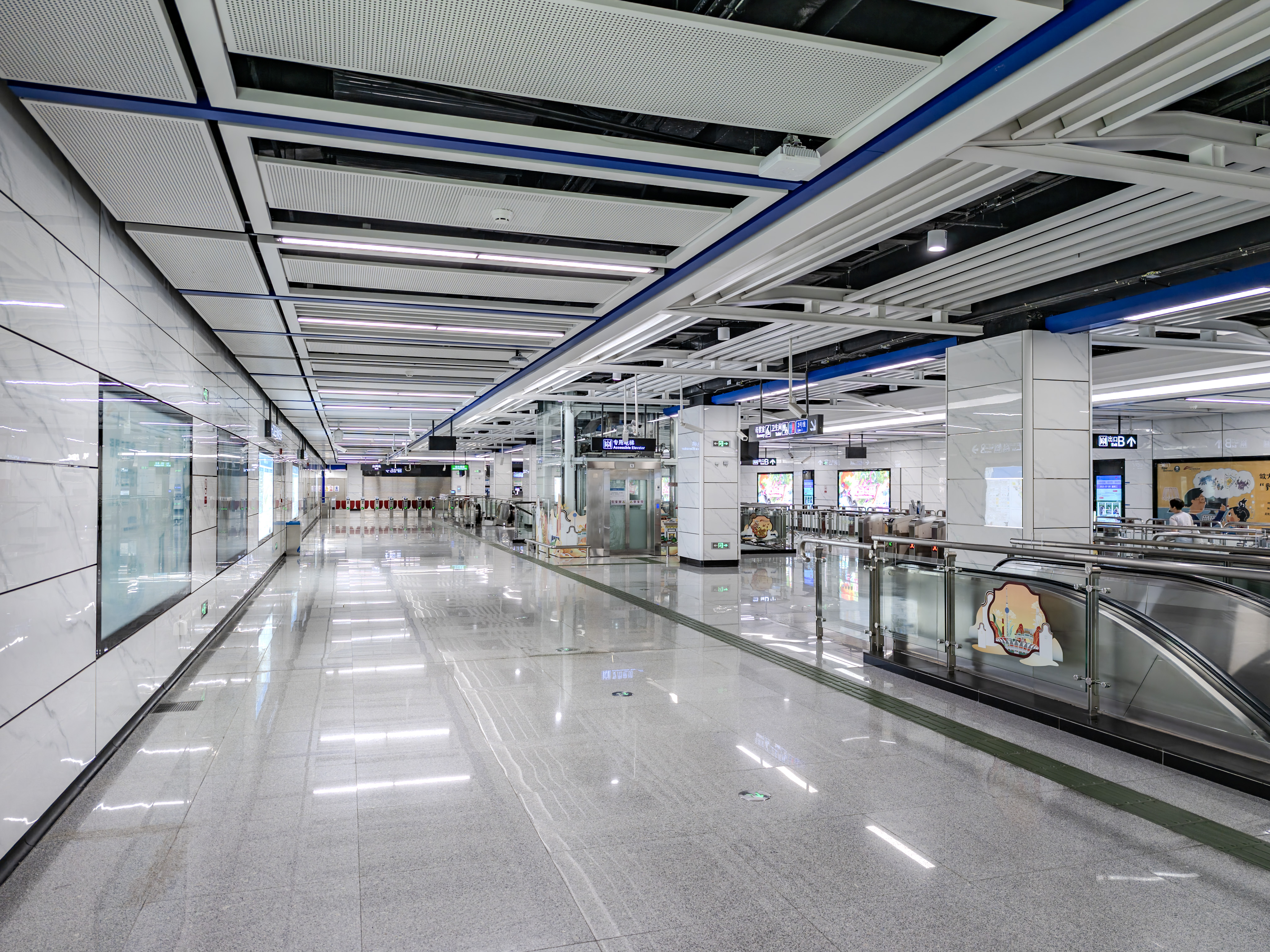
Concourse

== Station layout ==
The station has an island platform under Nanhai Boulevard.

G	-	Exits B-E
L1; Concourse	Lobby	Ticket Machines, Customer Service, Shops, Police Station, Security Facilities
L2; Platforms	Platform 1	3 towards Foshan University (Guicheng)
L2; Platforms	Island platform, doors will open on the left
L2; Platforms	Platform 2	3 towards Shunde College Railway Station (Jihua Liulu)

=== Entrances/exits ===
The station has 4 points of entry/exit, located on the north and south sides of Nanhai Boulevard. Exits B and E are equipped with elevators.

- B: Nanhai Boulevard Middle
- C: Tongji East Road
- D: Tongji East Road
- E: Tongji East Road
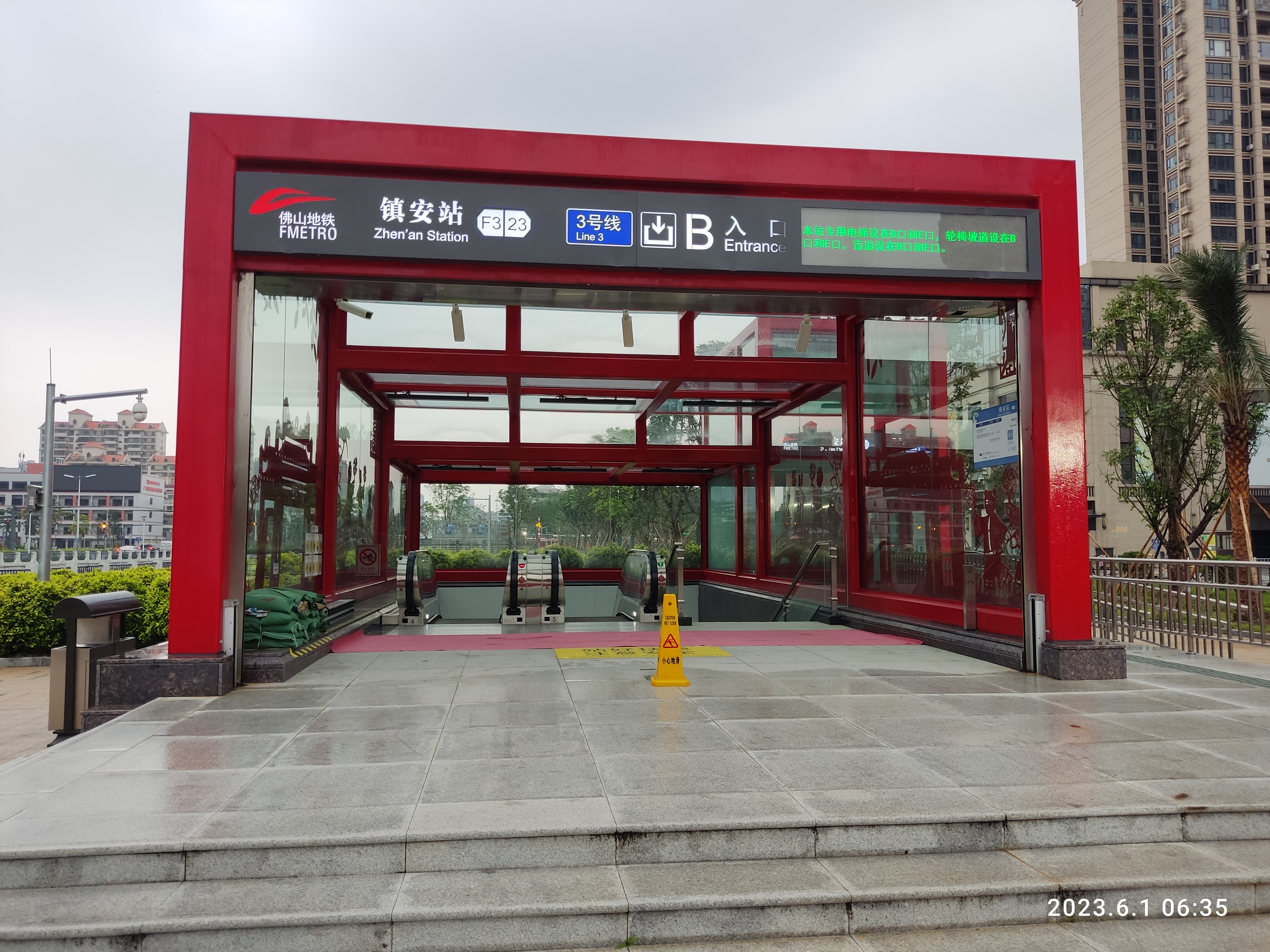
Entrance B

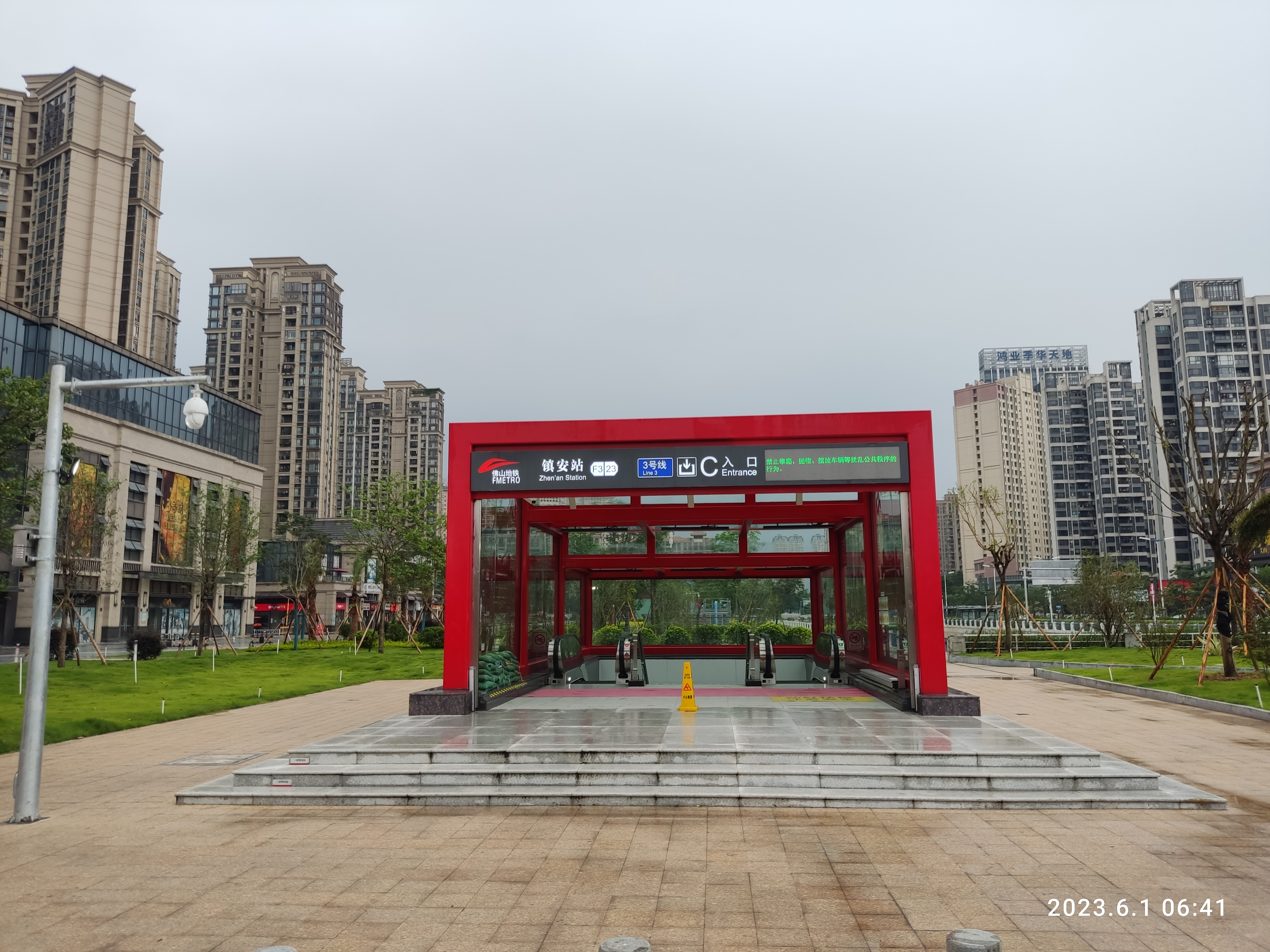
Entrance C

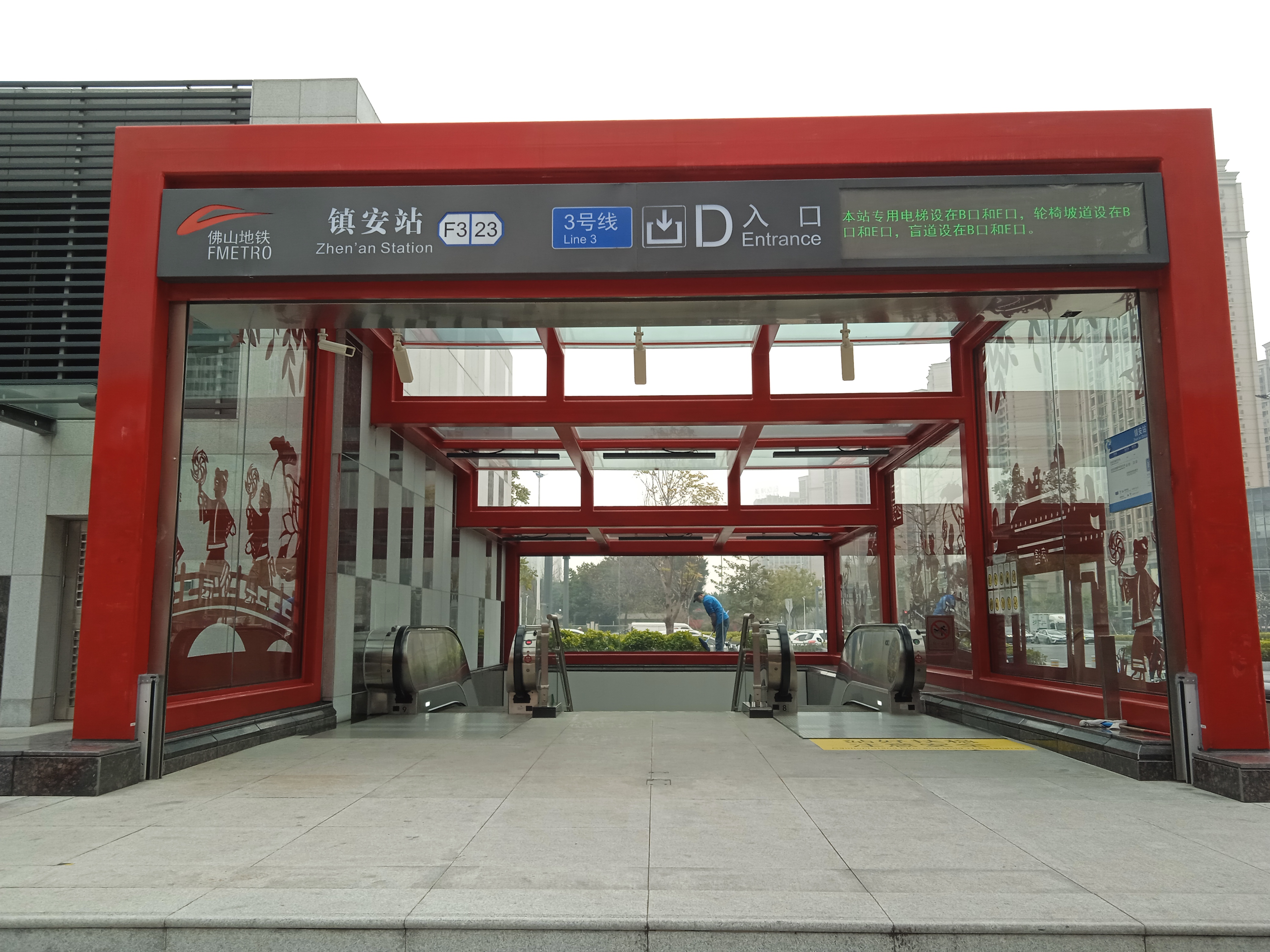
Entrance D

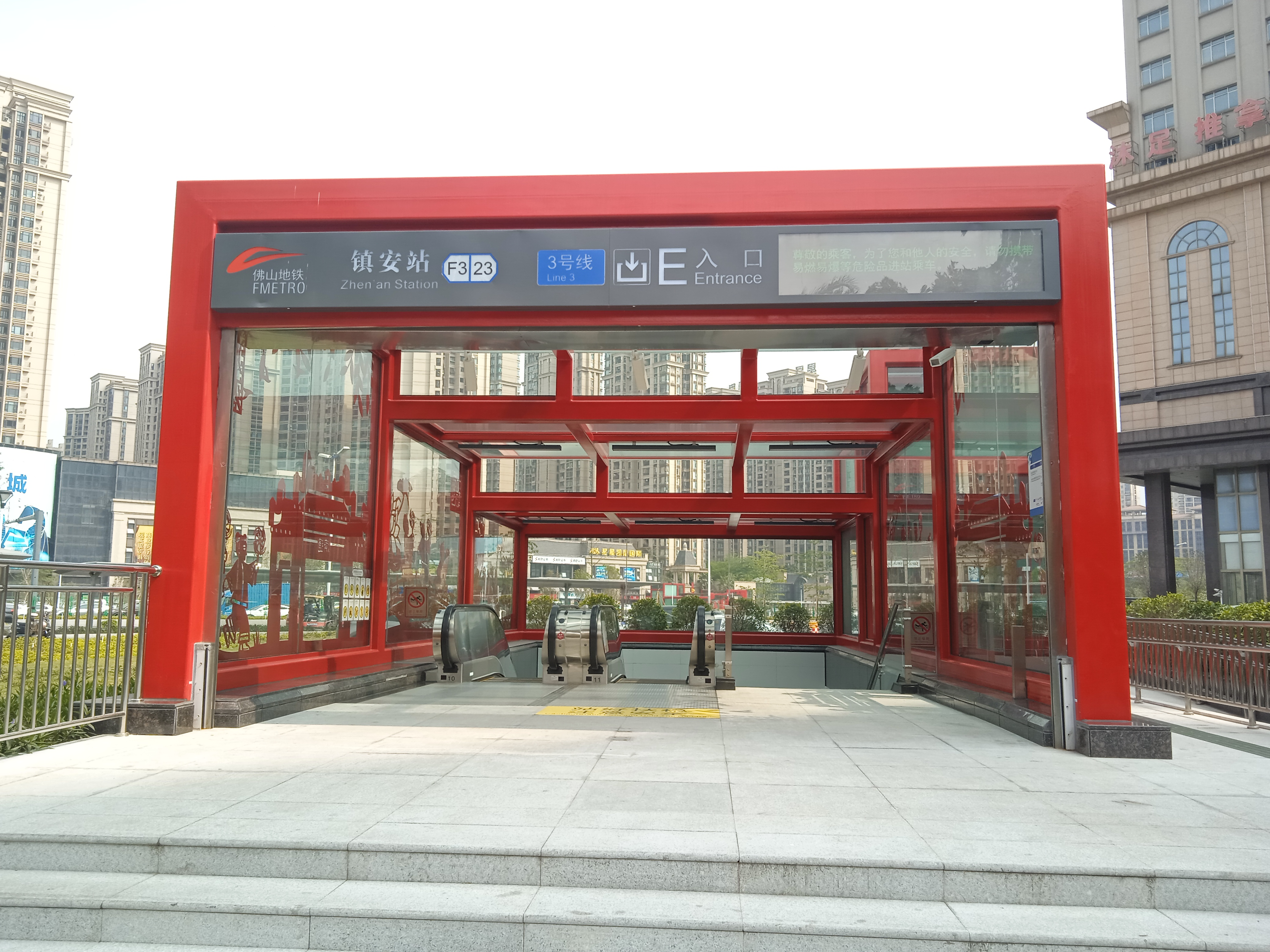
Entrance E

== History ==
The station began enclosure construction on 9 August 2017, and the second phase of enclosure construction on 25 August 2018.

On 10 November 2020, the main structure was successfully topped out. On 13 April 2021, the double line tunnel between this station and Jihua Liulu broke through. On 24 November 2021, the right line tunnel from this station to Guicheng successfully broke through. On 28 December 2022, the station opened with the opening of the initial section of Line 3 and served as its northern terminus. On 23 August 2024, after the opening of the southern section of the rear section of Line 3 (Zhen'an-Zhongshan Park), the station became an intermediate station of Line 3.

=== Role as terminus of Line 3 initial section ===
Due to the turnback setup, the first section of Line 3 can only use this station as the northern terminus, and it cannot continue to Guicheng station, which is only one stop away from this station and provides transfer to the Guangfo line, making the Chancheng section of Line 3 a "broken road" at this station. Therefore, if the station of the Chancheng section of Line 3 has to provide transfers to the stations along the Chancheng, Nanhai and Guangzhou sections of the Guangfo line, it is necessary to detour to Dongping station for transfer or pass through Wanhua and Kuiqi Lu stations on Line 2. Although the shuttle bus M1008 connecting this station to Guicheng station was created to make up for this problem, the inconvenience caused by this was still criticized by passengers. However, Guicheng station was not in a condition for train turnback, and Foshan Metro did not plan to open Line 3 to Guicheng station separately at that time.

Since 23 August 2024, with the opening of the section under construction of Line 3, this station will be able to lead into Guicheng station, and the "broken road" that has lasted for more than a year and a half has been opened. From that day on, the shuttle bus M1008 was also suspended.
