= Daliang Zhonglou station =

Foshan Metro Line 3 station

Daliang Zhonglou 大良钟楼
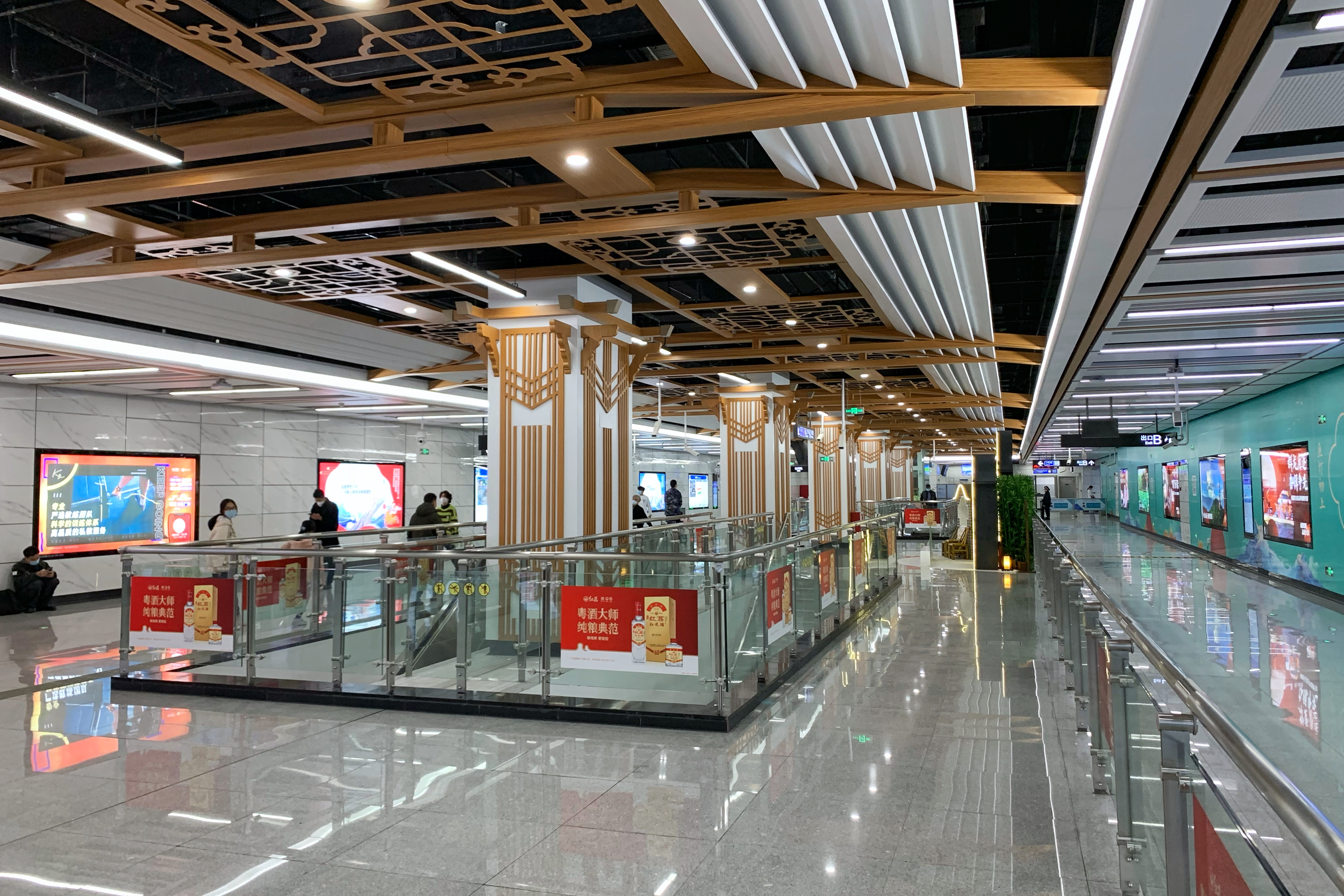
- "Great Exhibition Truss Map" themed concourse

Chinese name
- Simplified Chinese: 大良钟楼站
- Traditional Chinese: 大良鐘樓站
Transcriptions
Standard Mandarin
- Hanyu Pinyin: Dàliáng Zhōnglóu Zhàn
Yue: Cantonese
- Yale Romanization: Daailèuhng Jūnglàu Jaahm
- Jyutping: Daai^{6}loeng^{4} Zung^{1}lau^{4} Zaam^{6}

General information
- Location: North side of the intersection of Wenxiu Road (文秀路) and East Fengshan Road (凤山东路), Daliang Subdistrict; Shunde District, Foshan, Guangdong; China
- Coordinates: 22°50′31.85″N 113°14′51.94″E
- Operator: Foshan Metro Operation Co., Ltd.
- Line: Line 3
- Platforms: 2 (1 island platform)
- Tracks: 2

Construction
- Structure type: Underground
- Accessible: Yes

Other information
- Station code: F307

History
- Opened: 28 December 2022 (3 years ago)

Services
Preceding station	Foshan Metro	Following station
Huanshi Bei towards Foshan University	Line 3	Dongle Lu towards Shunde College Railway Station
Location

Daliang Zhonglou station (simplified Chinese: 大良钟楼站; traditional Chinese: 大良鐘樓站; pinyin: Dàliáng Zhōnglóu Zhàn; Cantonese Yale: Daailèuhng Jūnglàu Jaahm; lit. 'Daliang Bell Tower station') is a station on Line 3 of Foshan Metro, located in Foshan's Shunde District. It opened on 28 December 2022.

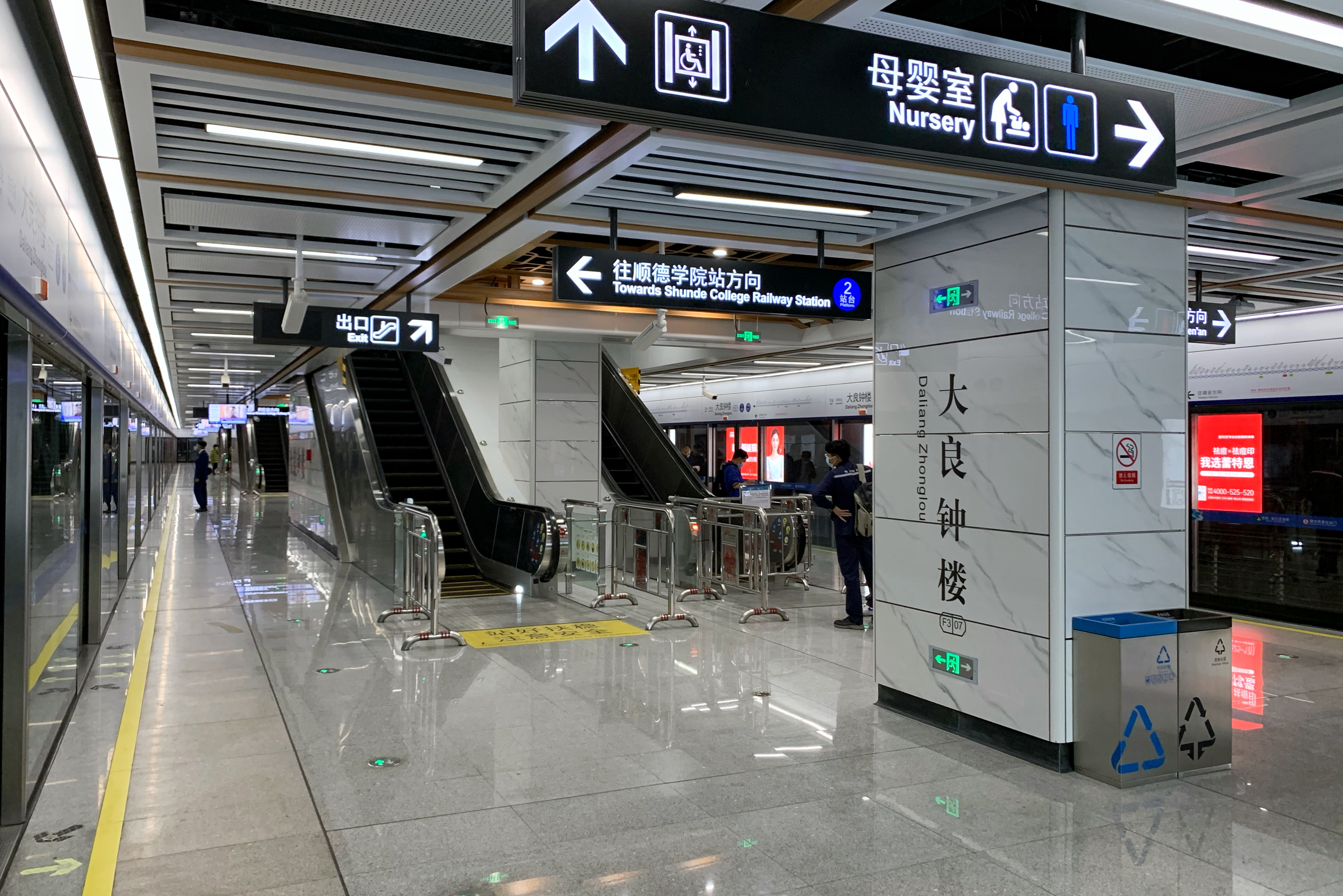
Platform

== Theme ==
This station is one of the featured stations of the initial section of Line 3, with the theme of "Grand Exhibition Truss Map" of Lingnan architectural ridges, integrating the elements of beam arches and Lingnan window grilles in Qinghui Garden, a scenic spot near the station, and the ceiling and column surface in the middle are made of wood grain aluminum profiles, showing the traditional cultural characteristics of Daliang.

== Station layout ==
The station has an island platform under Wenxiu Road.

G	-	Exits A, B, E
L1; Concourse	Lobby	Ticket Machines, Customer Service, Shops, Police Station, Security Facilities
L2; Mezzanine	-	Station Equipment
L3; Platforms	Platform 1	3 towards Foshan University (Huanshi Bei)
L3; Platforms	Island platform, doors will open on the left
L3; Platforms	Platform 2	3 towards Shunde College Railway Station (Dongle Lu)

=== Entrances/exits ===
The station has 3 points of entry/exit, located on the east and west sides of Wenxiu Road. Exit A is equipped with an elevator.

- A: Wenxiu Road
- B: Wenxiu Road
- E: Wenxiu Road, Qinghui Garden
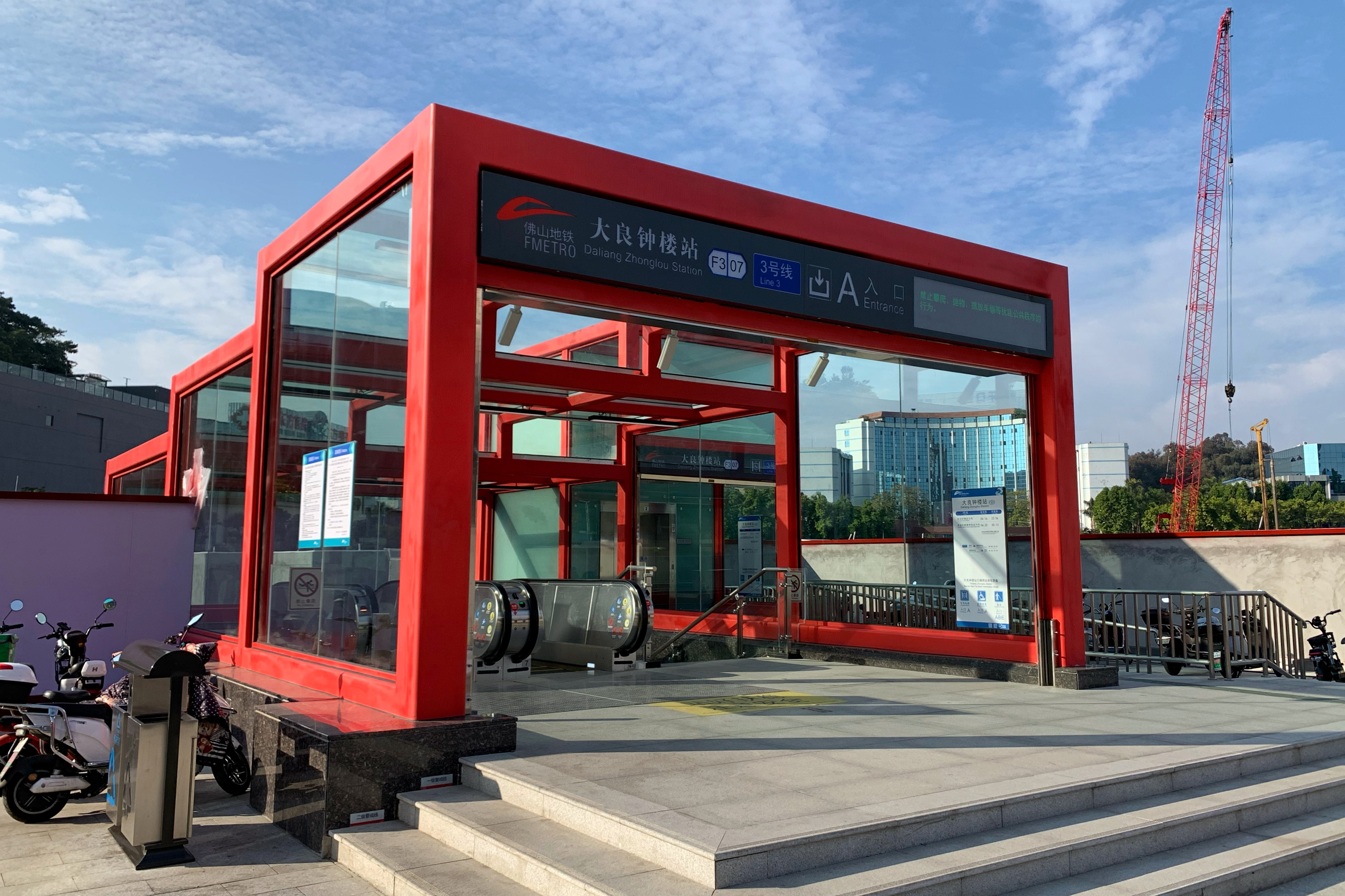
Entrance A

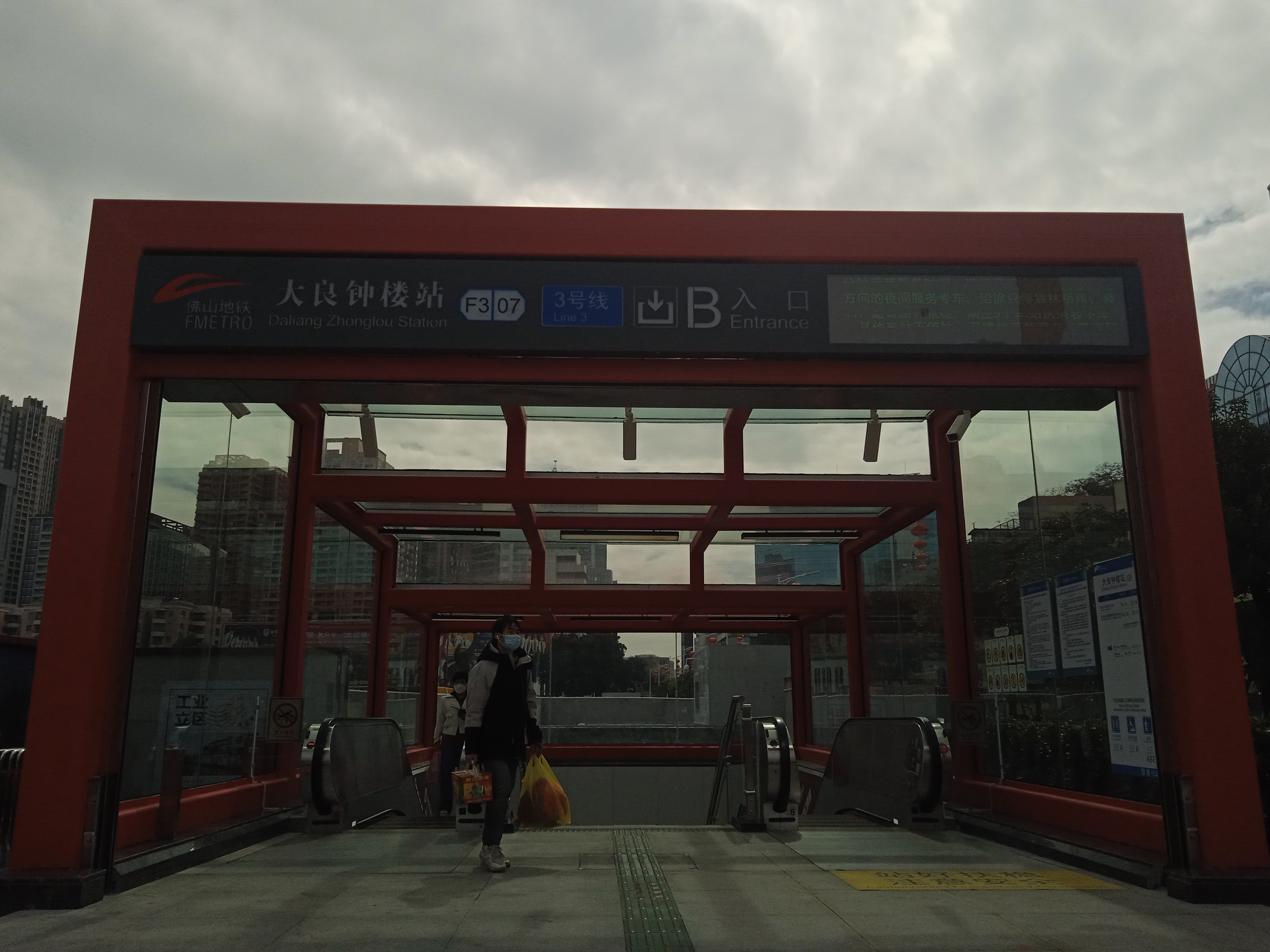
Entrance B

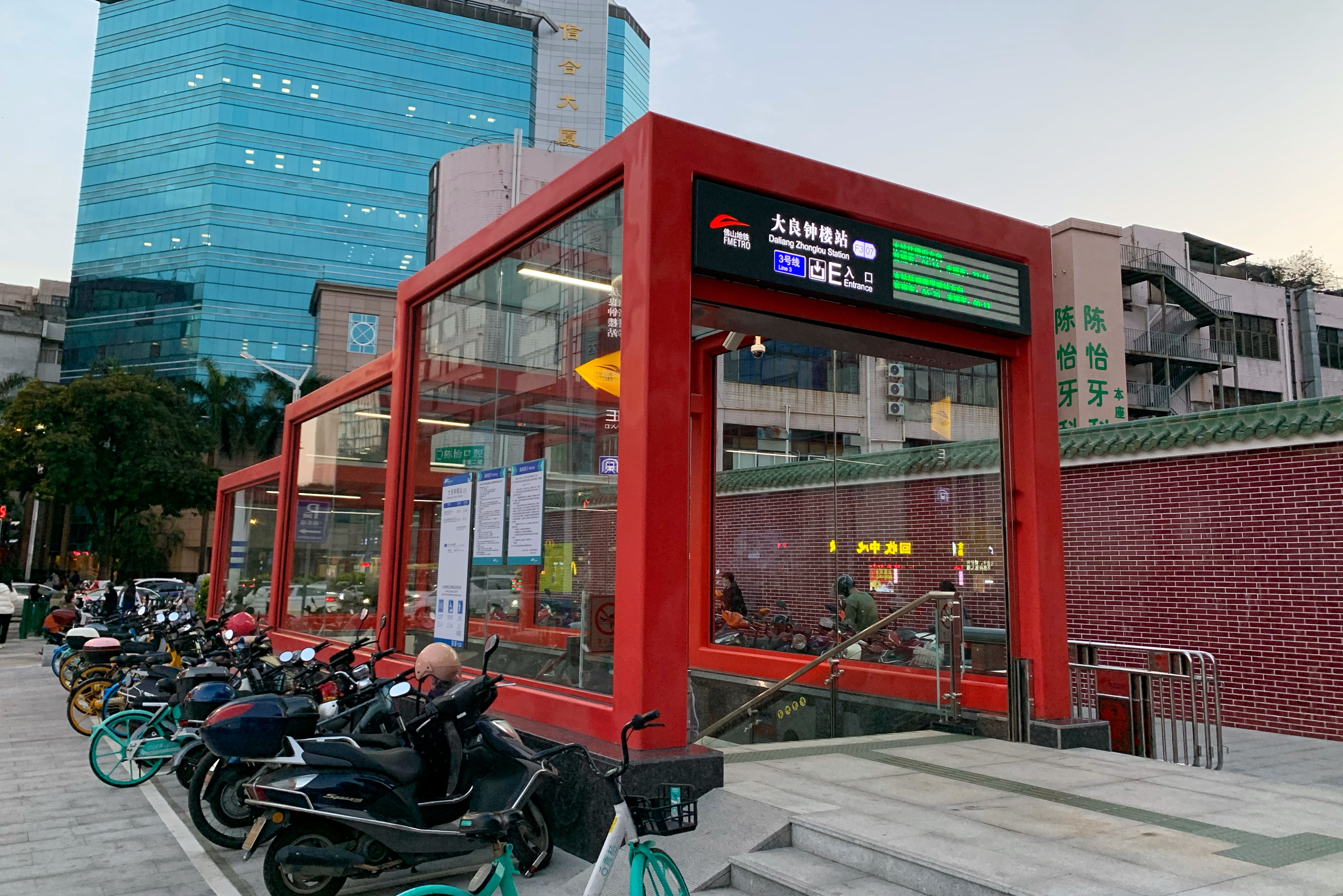
Entrance E

== History ==
The station was called Daliang station during the planning and construction phase. The station started construction on 18 November 2016. In 2022, the station was renamed to Daliang Zhonglou station. On 28 December the same year, the station opened with the opening of Line 3.
