= Dongle Lu station =

Foshan Metro Line 3 station

Dongle Lu 东乐路
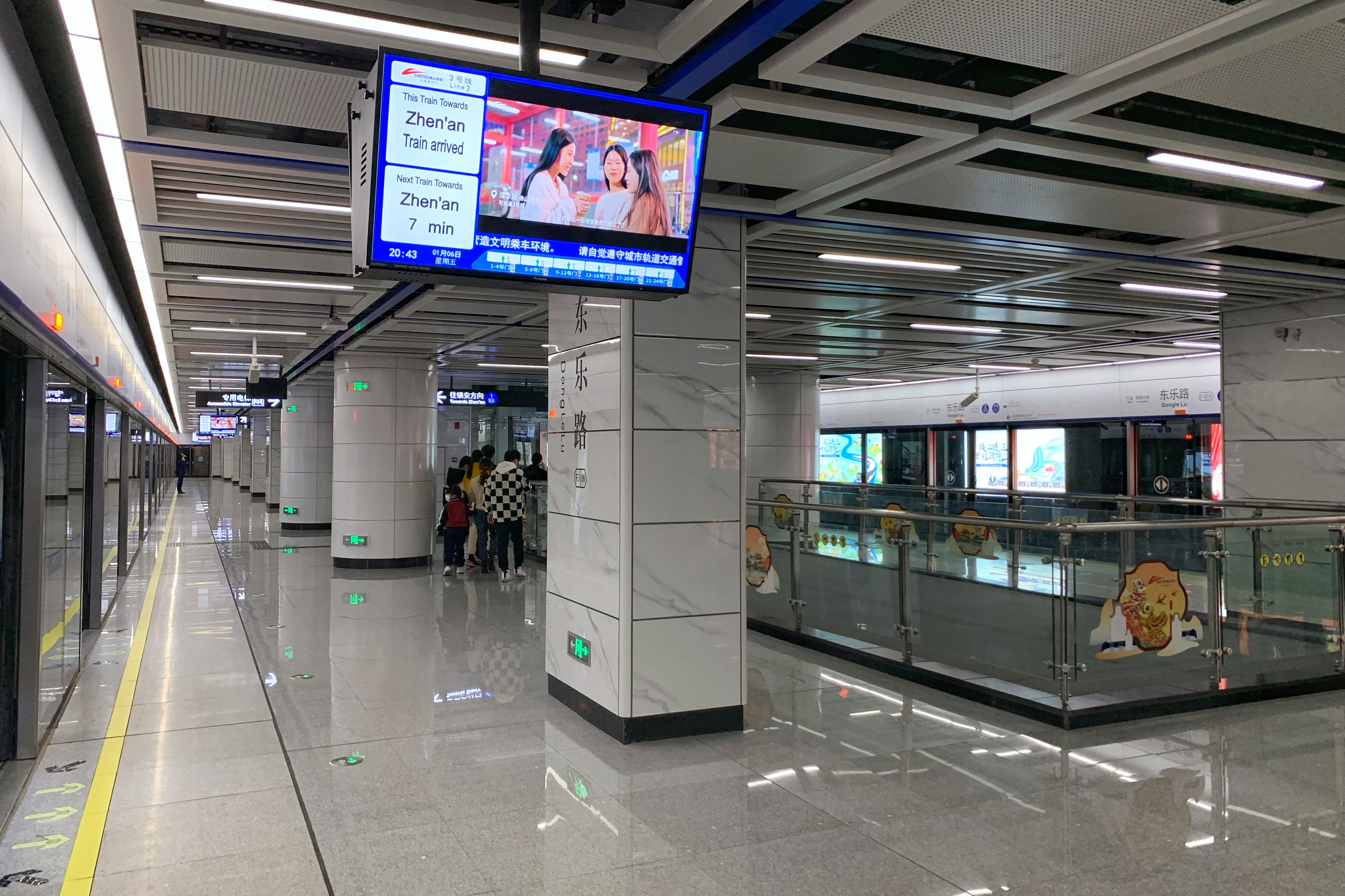
- Platform

Chinese name
- Simplified Chinese: 东乐路站
- Traditional Chinese: 东樂路站
Transcriptions
Standard Mandarin
- Hanyu Pinyin: Dōnglè Lù Zhàn
Yue: Cantonese
- Yale Romanization: Dūnglohk Lǒu Jaahm
- Jyutping: Dung^{1}lok^{6} Lou^{6} Zaam^{6}

General information
- Location: Outside the intersection of Dongle Road (东乐路) and Huanshi East Road (环市东路), Daliang Subdistrict; Shunde District, Foshan, Guangdong; China
- Coordinates: 22°50′15.83″N 113°15′33.8″E
- Operator: Foshan Metro Operation Co., Ltd.
- Lines: Line 3 Line 11 (future)
- Platforms: 2 (1 island platform)
- Tracks: 2

Construction
- Structure type: Underground
- Platform levels: 2
- Accessible: Yes

Other information
- Station code: F306

History
- Opened: 28 December 2022 (3 years ago)

Services
Preceding station	Foshan Metro	Following station
Daliang Zhonglou towards Foshan University	Line 3	Jurong Beilu towards Shunde College Railway Station
Location

Dongle Lu station (simplified Chinese: 东乐路站; traditional Chinese: 东樂路站; pinyin: Dōnglè Lù Zhàn; Cantonese Yale: Dūnglohk Lǒu Jaahm) is a station on Line 3 of Foshan Metro, located in Foshan's Shunde District. It opened on 28 December 2022.

== Station layout ==
The Line 3 station has an island platform under Dongle Road.

G	-	Exits A-D
L1; Concourse	Lobby	Ticket Machines, Customer Service, Shops, Police Station, Security Facilities
L2; Mezzanine	-	Station Equipment
L3; Platforms	Platform 1	3 towards Foshan University (Daliang Zhonglou)
L3; Platforms	Island platform, doors will open on the left
L3; Platforms	Platform 2	3 towards Shunde College Railway Station (Jurong Beilu)
L4; Reserved Platforms		11 reserved track area
L4; Reserved Platforms	Reserved Island platform
L4; Reserved Platforms		11 reserved track area

=== Entrances/exits ===
The station has 4 points of entry/exit, located on the north and south sides of Dongle Road. Exits B and D are equipped with elevators.

- A: Dongle Road
- B: Dongle Road
- C: Dongle Road
- D: Dongle Road

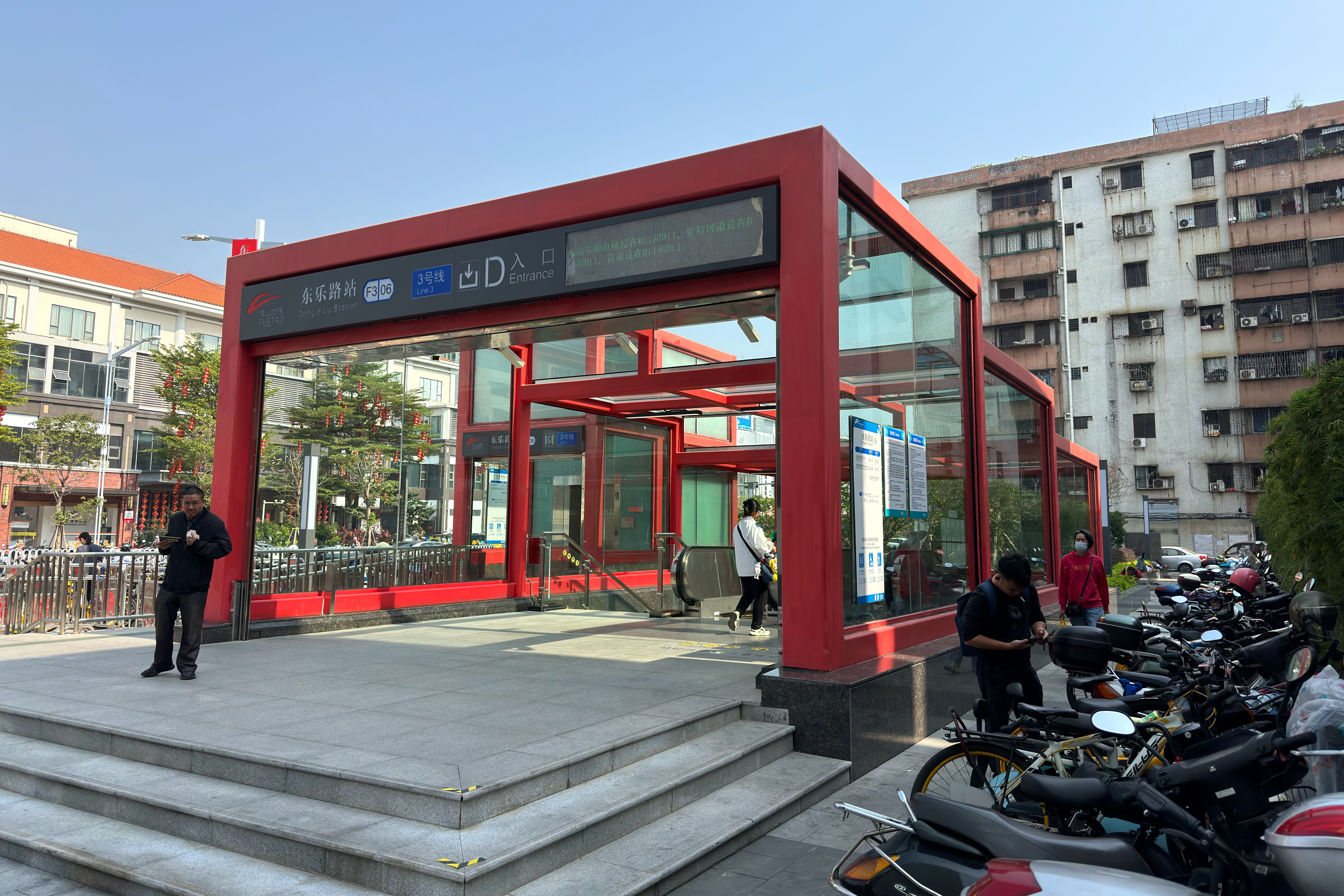
Entrance D

== History ==
When Line 3 was approved in 2012, this station was set up at the intersection of Dongle Road and Xingui Middle Road. In 2015, the planning of Line 3 changed, and the station was moved west to the intersection of Huanshi East Road, and Jurong Beilu station was established at the intersection of Jurong North Road on the east side of the original Dongle Lu station. The relevant adjustment plan was approved by the Guangdong Provincial Development and Reform Commission on 28 March 2019.

On 12 April 2017, the station began enclosure construction. On 26 February 2019, the first tunnel boring machine of Line 3 departed from Daliang station (now Daliang Zhonglou station) and excavated to this station. On 26 March 2021, the station started auxiliary entrance and exit construction and began the mechanical and electrical construction phase, and officially handed over the electrical operations three days later. On 29 April the same year, the double line tunnel from this station to Daliang Zhonglou was short tracked. On 27 May 2022, the site passed the project acceptance. On 28 December the same year, the station opened with the opening of Line 3.

== Future development ==
The station is planned to have an interchange with Line 11.

== Gallery ==
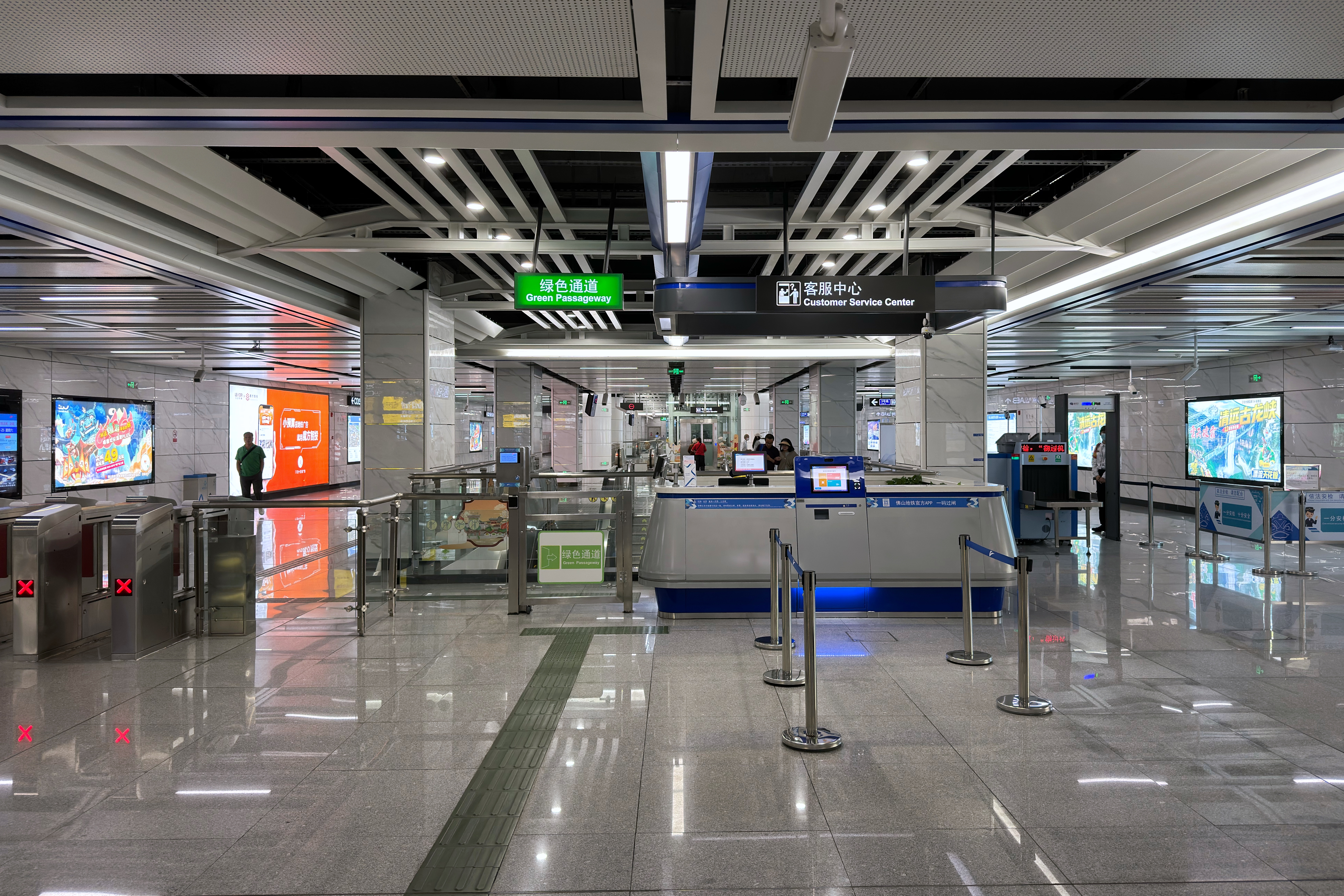
Concourse

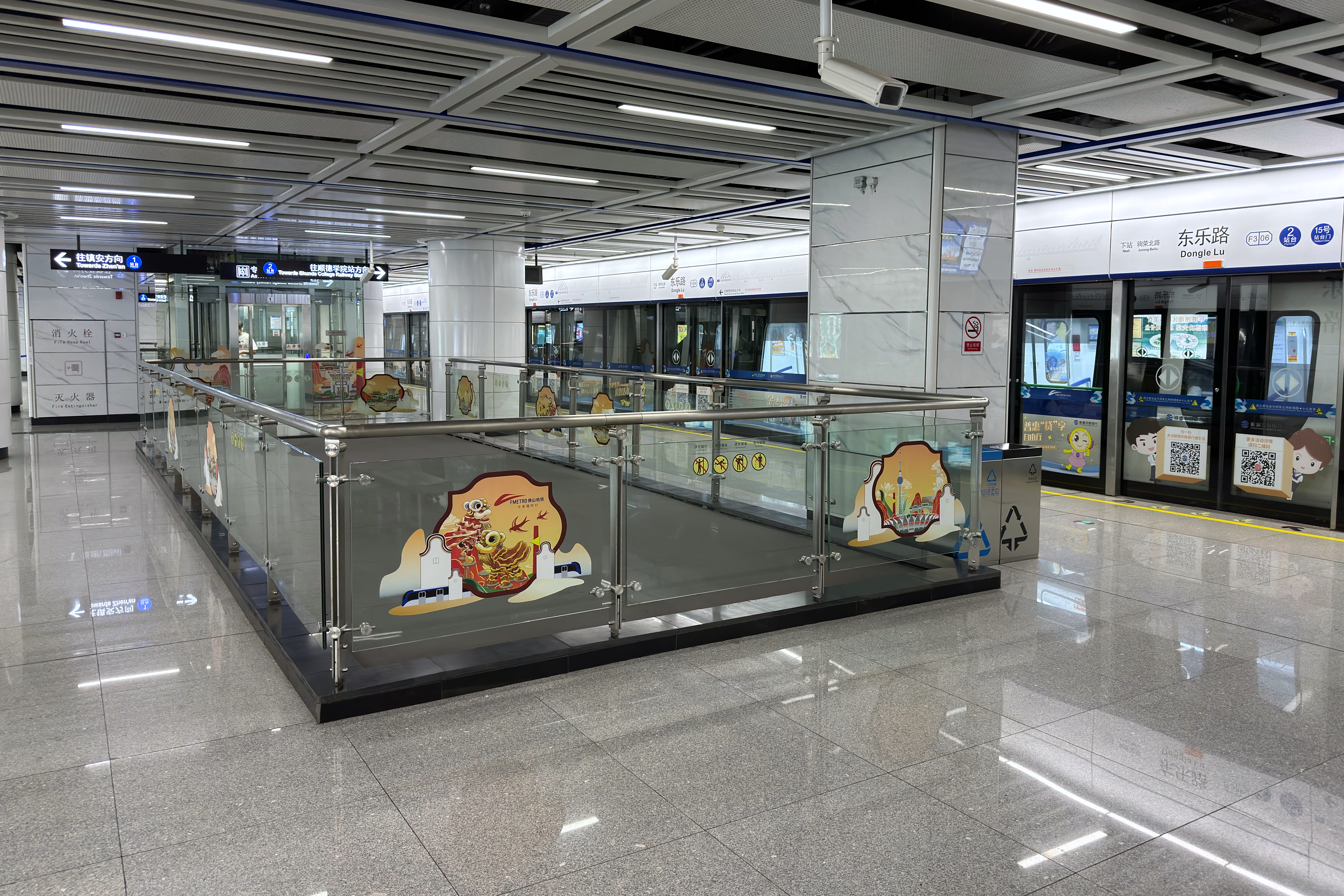
Reserved interchange node to Line 11 (November 2023)
