= Jurong Beilu station =

Foshan Metro Line 3 station

Jurong Beilu 驹荣北路
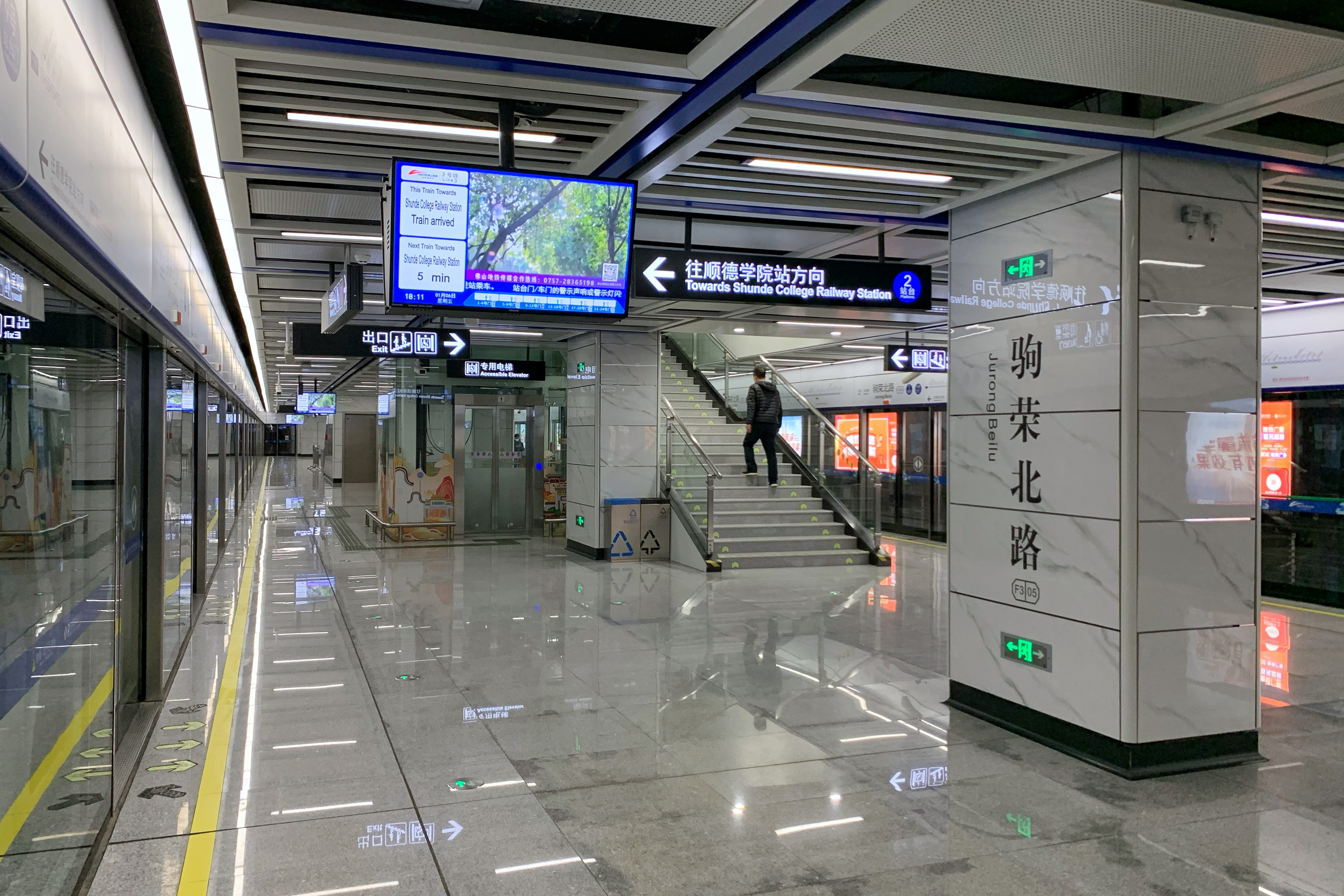
- Platform

Chinese name
- Simplified Chinese: 驹荣北路站
- Traditional Chinese: 駒榮北路站
Transcriptions
Standard Mandarin
- Hanyu Pinyin: Jūróng Běilù Zhàn
Yue: Cantonese
- Yale Romanization: Kēuiwìng Bāklǒu Jaahm
- Jyutping: Keoi^{1}wing^{4} Bak^{1}lou^{6} Zaam^{6}

General information
- Location: Intersection of Middle Dongle Road (东乐中路) and North Jurong Road (驹荣北路), Daliang Subdistrict; Shunde District, Foshan, Guangdong; China
- Coordinates: 22°50′15.79″N 113°16′20.68″E
- Operator: Foshan Metro Operation Co., Ltd.
- Line: Line 3
- Platforms: 2 (1 island platform)
- Tracks: 2

Construction
- Structure type: Underground
- Accessible: Yes

Other information
- Station code: F305

History
- Opened: 28 December 2022 (3 years ago)

Services
Preceding station	Foshan Metro	Following station
Dongle Lu towards Foshan University	Line 3	Shunde No.1 High School towards Shunde College Railway Station
Location

Jurong Beilu station (simplified Chinese: 驹荣北路站; traditional Chinese: 駒榮北路站; pinyin: Jūróng Běilù Zhàn; Cantonese Yale: Kēuiwìng Bāklǒu Jaahm; lit. 'Jurong North Road station') is a station on Line 3 of Foshan Metro, located in Foshan's Shunde District. It opened on 28 December 2022.

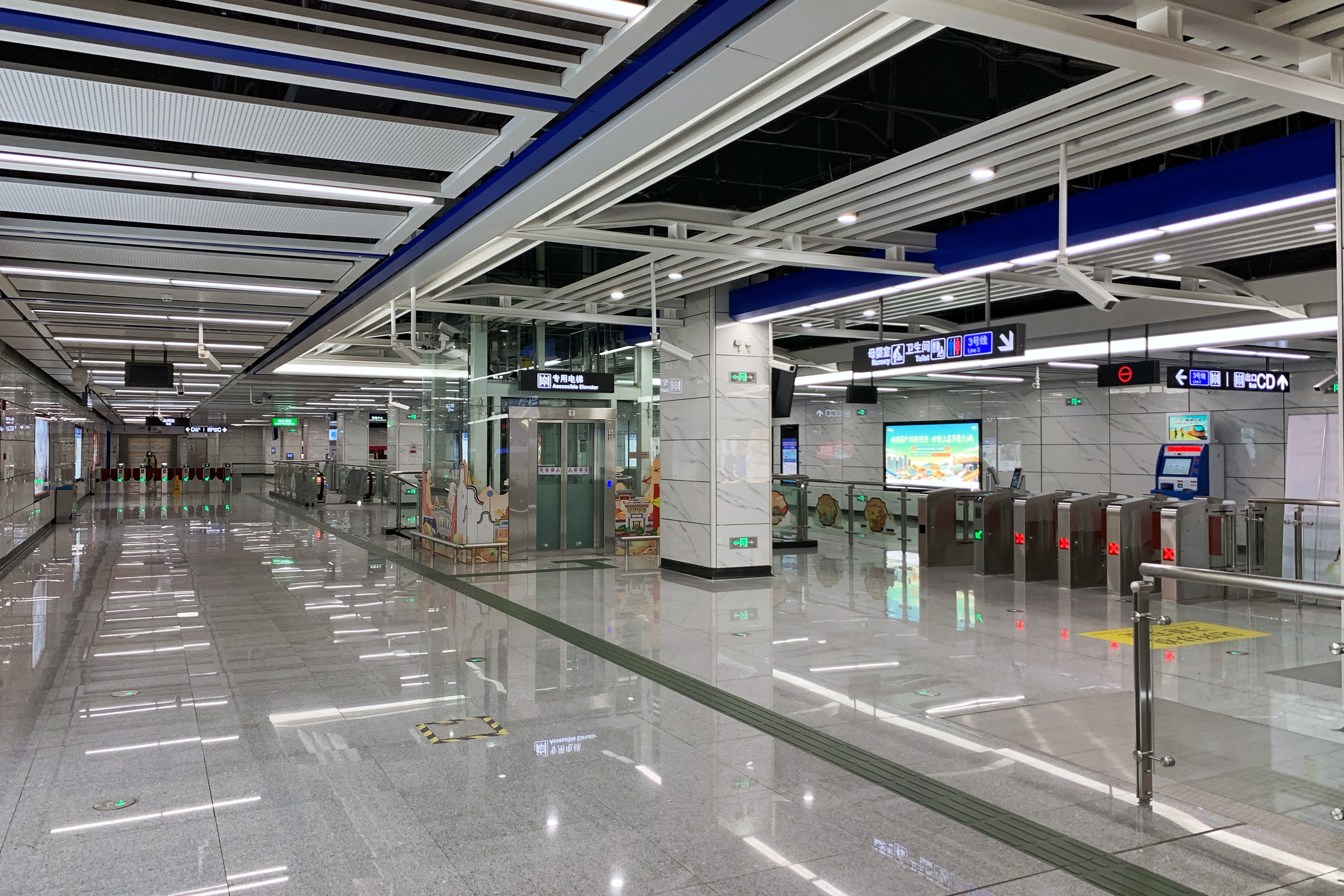
Concourse

== Station layout ==
The station has an island platform under Middle Dongle Road.

G	-	Exits A-D
L1; Concourse	Lobby	Ticket Machines, Customer Service, Shops, Police Station, Security Facilities
L2; Platforms	Platform 1	3 towards Foshan University (Dongle Lu)
L2; Platforms	Island platform, doors will open on the left
L2; Platforms	Platform 2	3 towards Shunde College Railway Station (Shunde No.1 High School)

=== Entrances/exits ===
The station has 4 points of entry/exit, located on the north and south sides of Dongle Road Middle. Exits A and C are equipped with elevators.

- A: Jurong Road
- B: Jurong Road
- C: Jurong Road
- D: Jurong Road
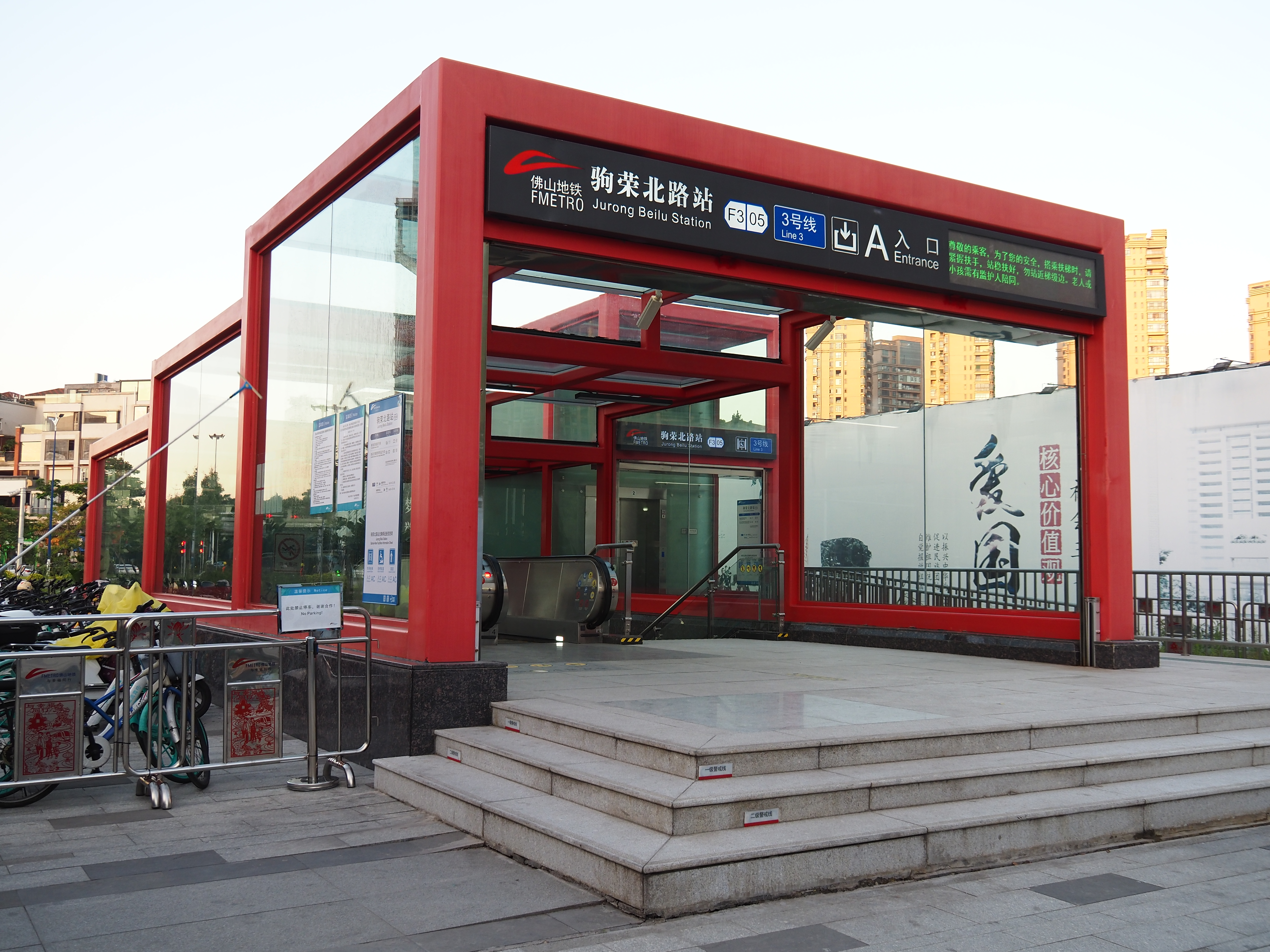
Entrance A

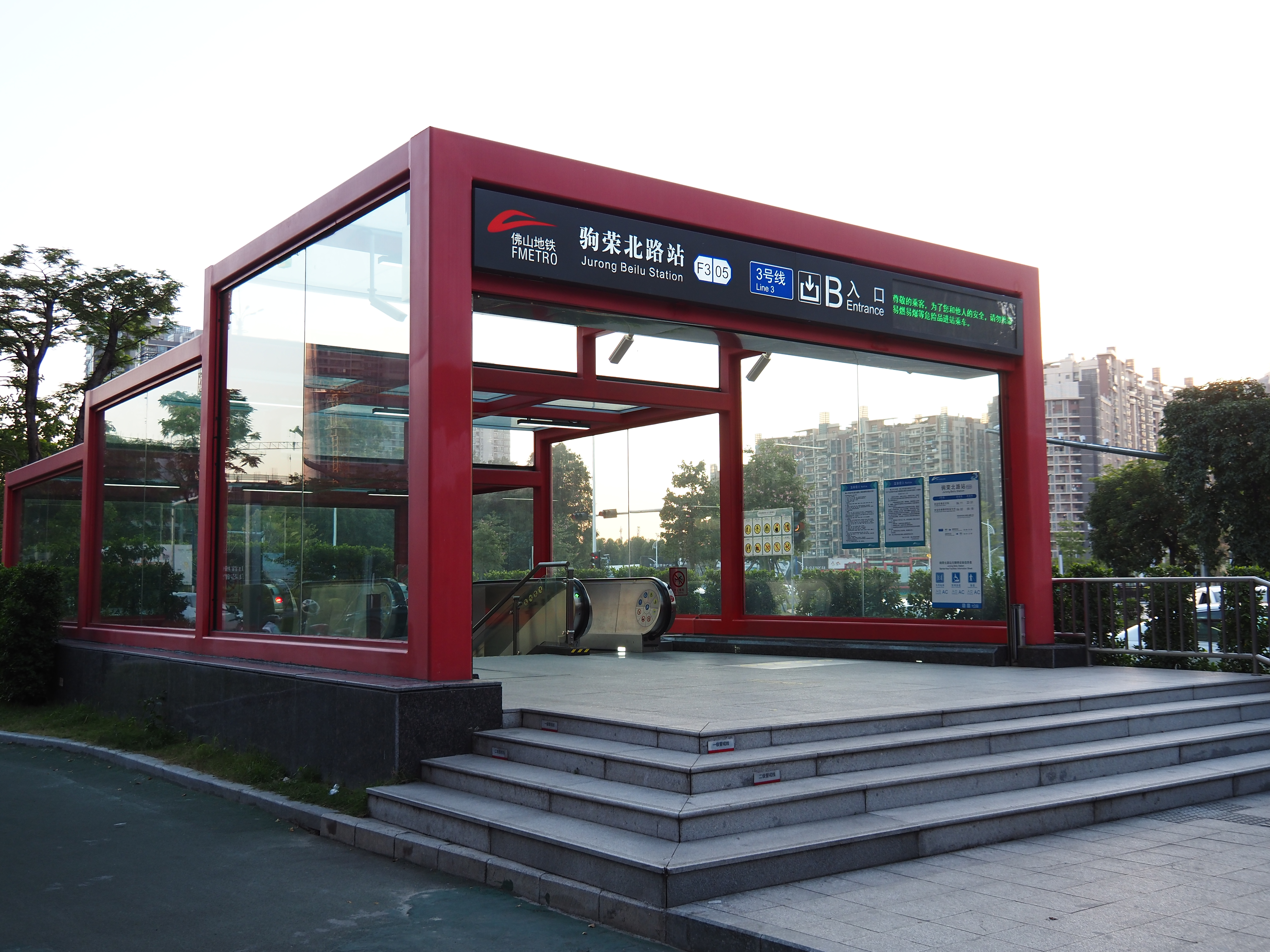
Entrance B

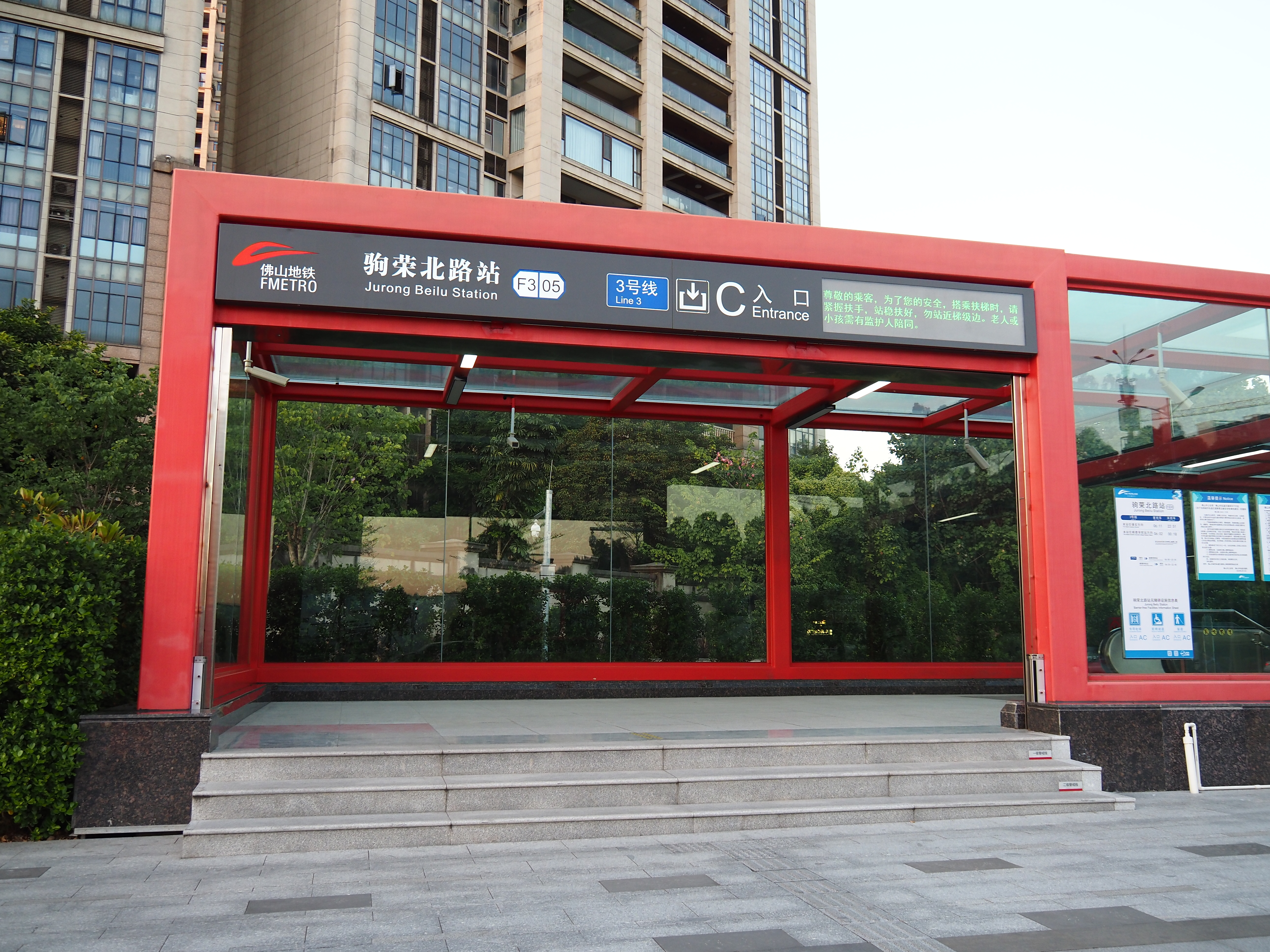
Entrance C

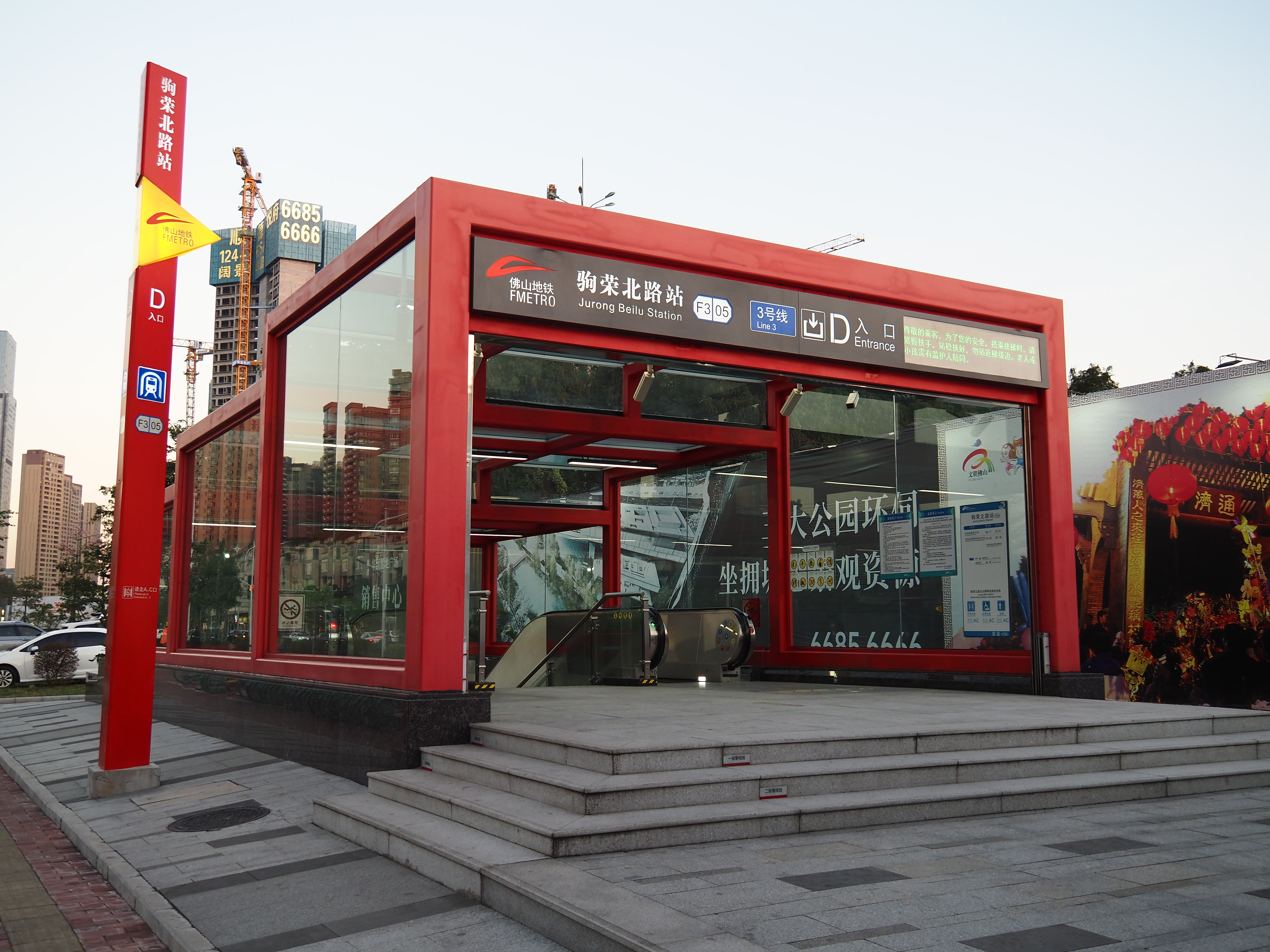
Entrance D

== History ==
When Line 3 was approved in 2012, this station was not set up, but only Dongle Lu station was set up at the intersection of Dongle Road and Xingui Middle Road. In 2015, the planning of Line 3 changed, and Dongle Lu station was moved west to the intersection of Huanshi East Road, and this station was established at the intersection of Jurong North Road on the east side of the original Dongle Lu station. The relevant adjustment plan was approved by the Guangdong Provincial Development and Reform Commission on 28 March 2019.

On 25 March 2017, the station began enclosure construction. On 7 February 2018, the envelope structure of the station was completed. On 9 November 2020, the double line tunnel between this station and Dongle Lu station broke through. On 31 July 2022, the site passed the project acceptance. On 28 December the same year, the station opened with the opening of Line 3.
