= Huanshi Bei station =

Foshan Metro Line 3 station

Huanshi Bei 环市北
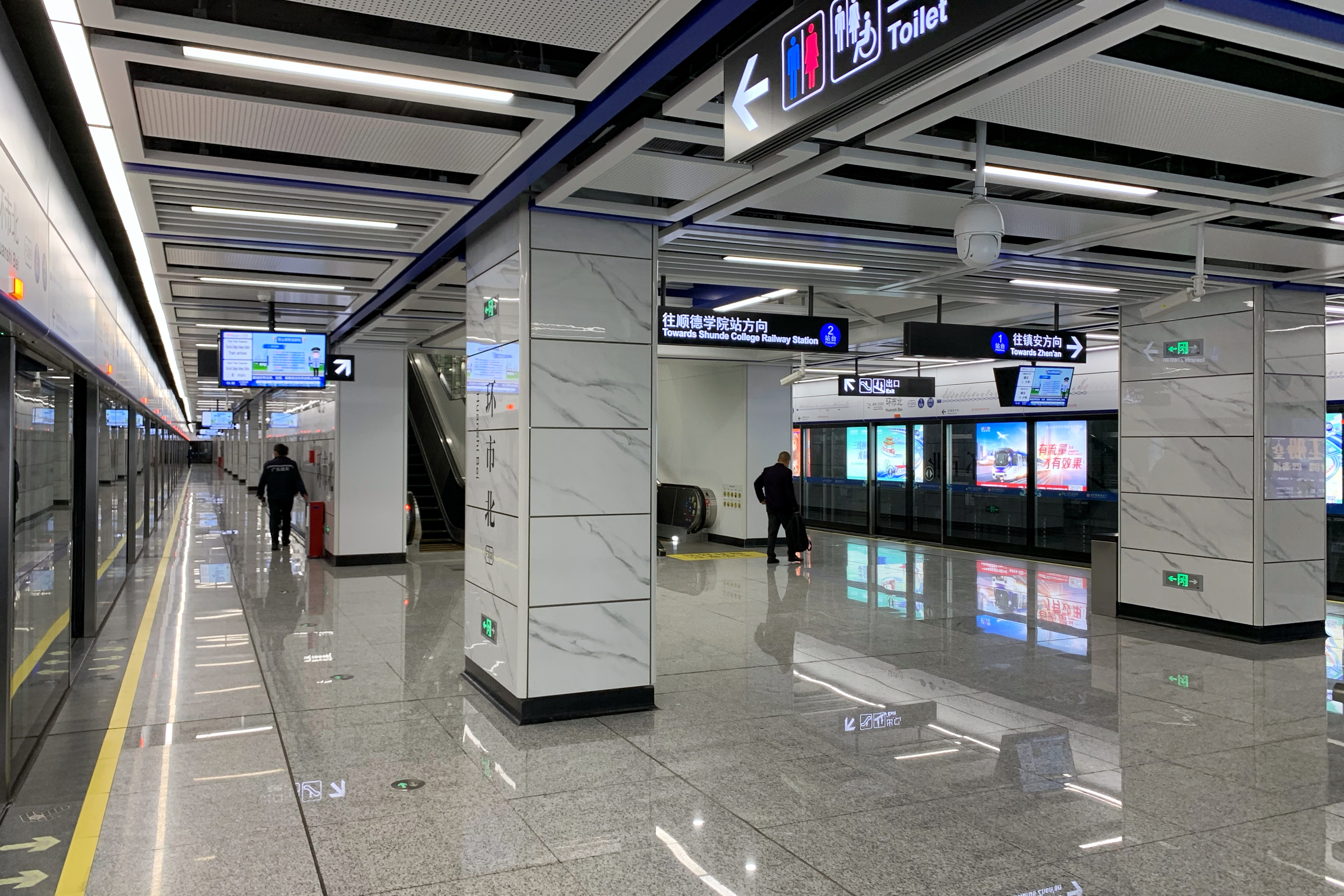
- Platform

Chinese name
- Simplified Chinese: 环市北站
- Traditional Chinese: 環市北站
Transcriptions
Standard Mandarin
- Hanyu Pinyin: Huánshì Běi Zhàn
Yue: Cantonese
- Yale Romanization: Wàansí Bāk Jaahm
- Jyutping: Waan^{4} si^{5} Bak^{1} Zaam^{6}

General information
- Location: North side of the intersection of North Huanshi Road (环市北路) and Jiazi Road (凤山东路) (Across the west side of the road near Jiazi Bridge (甲子小桥)), Daliang Subdistrict; Shunde District, Foshan, Guangdong; China
- Coordinates: 22°51′15.19″N 113°14′20.51″E
- Operator: Foshan Metro Operation Co., Ltd.
- Line: Line 3
- Platforms: 2 (1 island platform)
- Tracks: 2

Construction
- Structure type: Underground
- Accessible: Yes

Other information
- Station code: F308

History
- Opened: 28 December 2022 (3 years ago)
- Former names: Xinsong (新松)

Services
Preceding station	Foshan Metro	Following station
The First People's Hospital of Shunde towards Foshan University	Line 3	Daliang Zhonglou towards Shunde College Railway Station
Location

Huanshi Bei station (simplified Chinese: 环市北站; traditional Chinese: 環市北站; pinyin: Huánshì Běi Zhàn; Cantonese Yale: Wàansí Bāk Jaahm) is a station on Line 3 of Foshan Metro, located in Foshan's Shunde District. It opened on 28 December 2022.

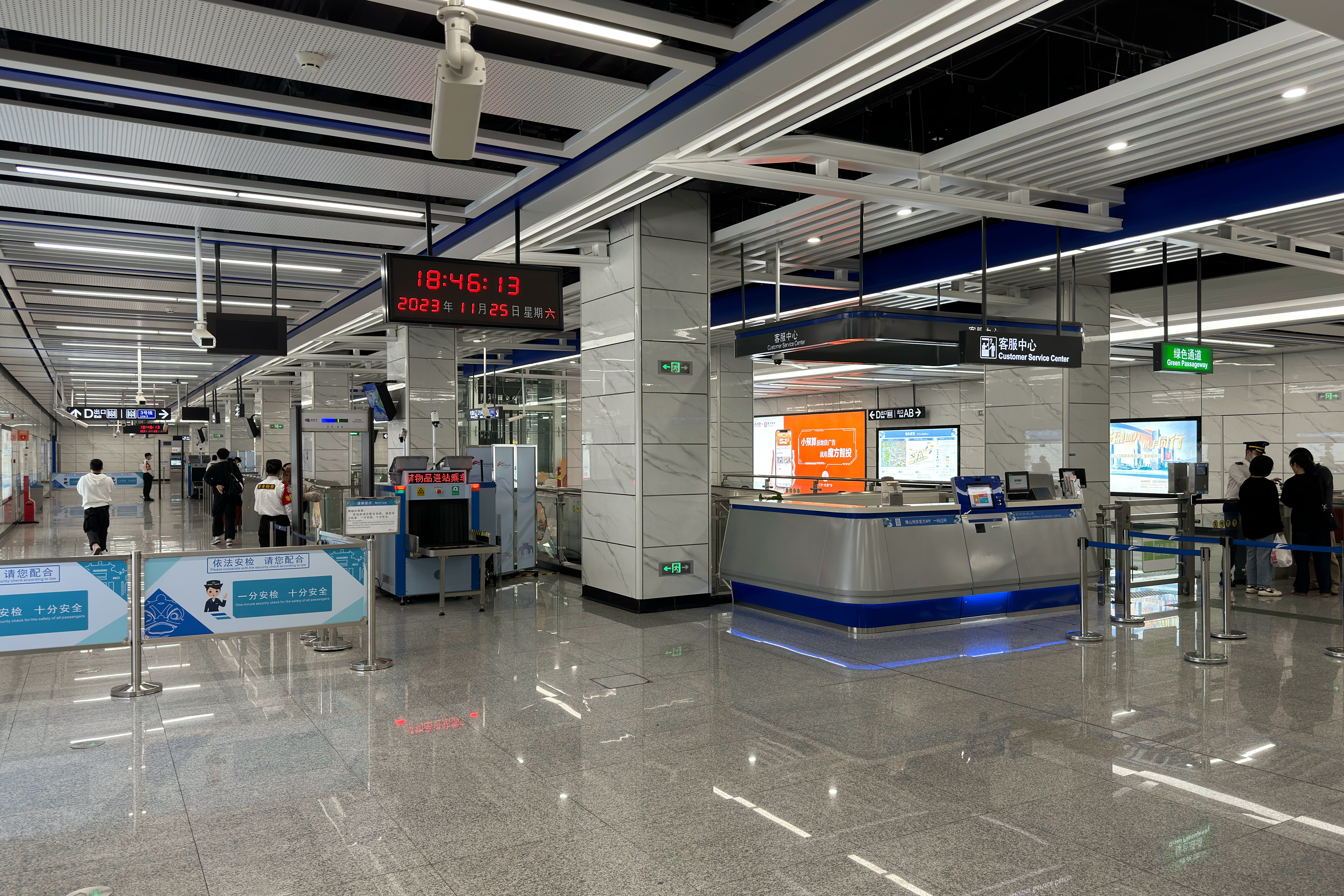
Concourse

== Station layout ==
The station has an island platform under Jiazi Road.

G	-	Exits A, B, D
L1; Concourse	Lobby	Ticket Machines, Customer Service, Shops, Police Station, Security Facilities
L2; Mezzanine	-	Station Equipment
L3; Platforms	Platform 1	3 towards Foshan University (The First People's Hospital of Shunde)
L3; Platforms	Island platform, doors will open on the left
L3; Platforms	Platform 2	3 towards Shunde College Railway Station (Daliang Zhonglou)

=== Entrances/exits ===
The station has 3 points of entry/exit, located on the east and west sides of Jiazi Road. In the future, Exit C will be implemented. Exit D is equipped with an elevator.

- A: Huanshi North Road
- B: Huanshi North Road
- D: Guipan Road
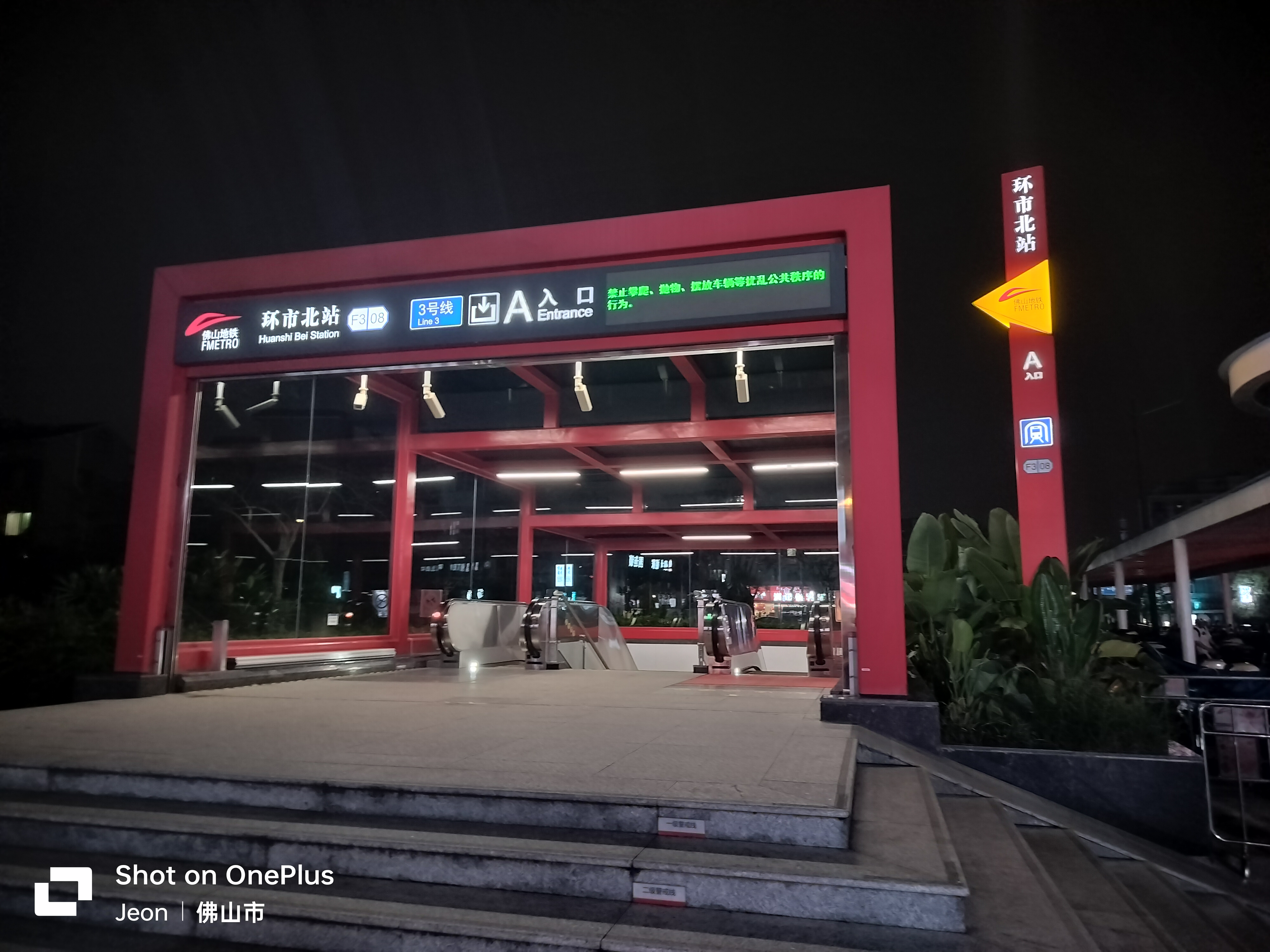
Entrance A

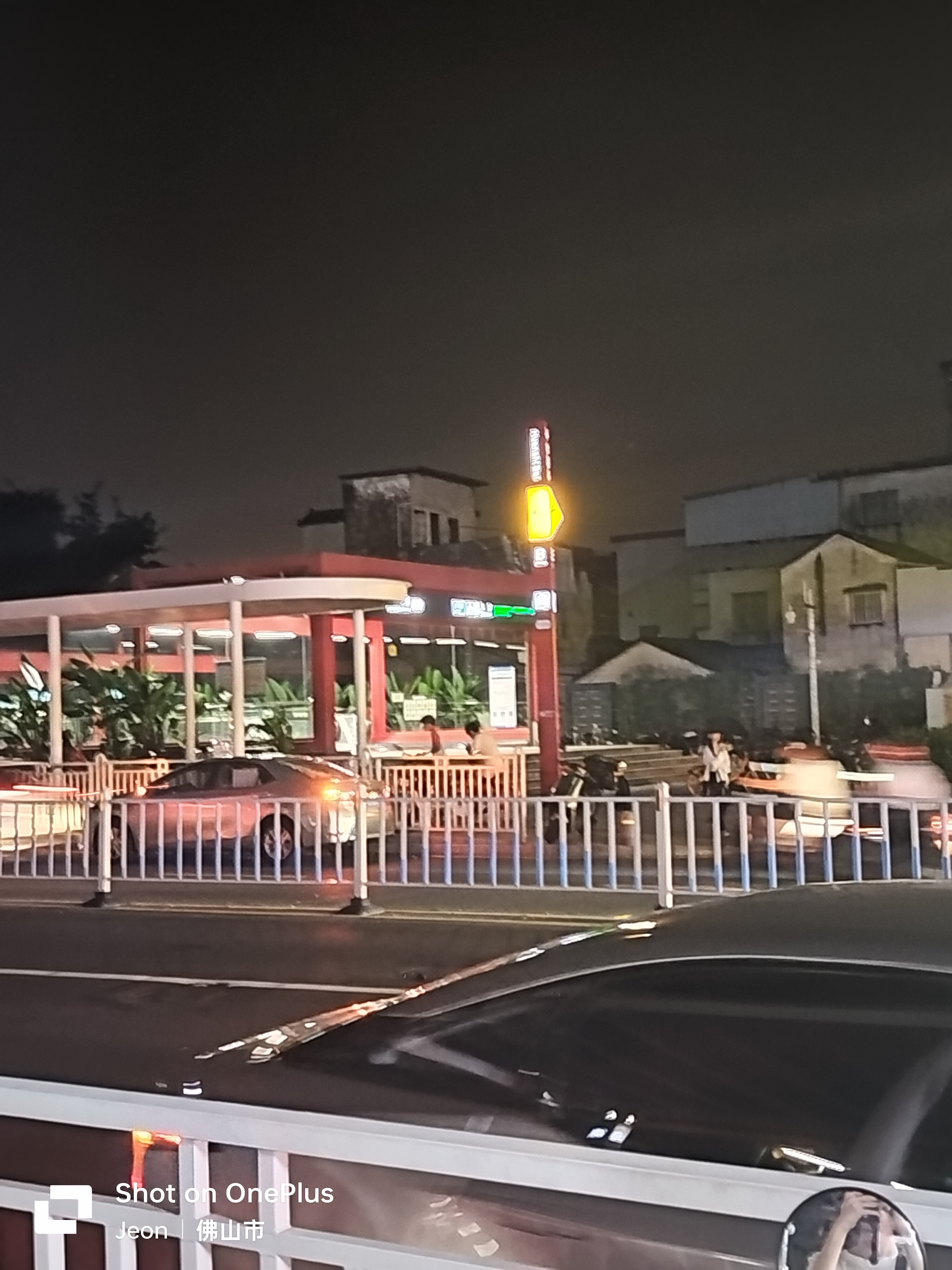
Entrance B

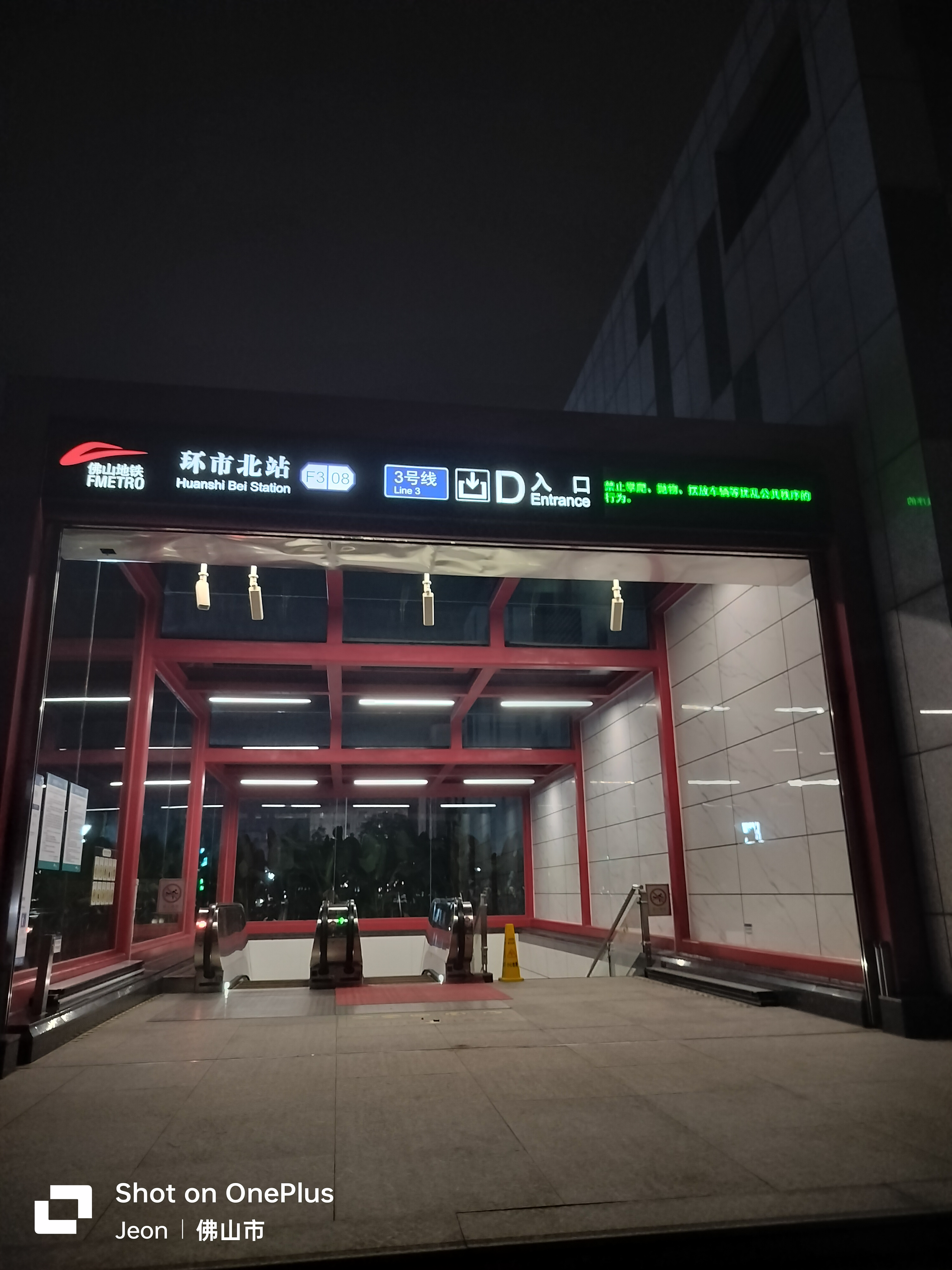
Entrance D

== History ==
The station was called Xinsong station during the planning and construction phase. The station officially started construction in 2017, and sealed the base slab on 22 April 2020, before topping out on 25 August the same year. In 2022, the station was renamed to Huanshi Bei station. On 28 December the same year, the station opened with the opening of Line 3.
