= Shunde No.1 High School station =

Foshan Metro Line 3 station

Shunde No.1 High School 顺德一中
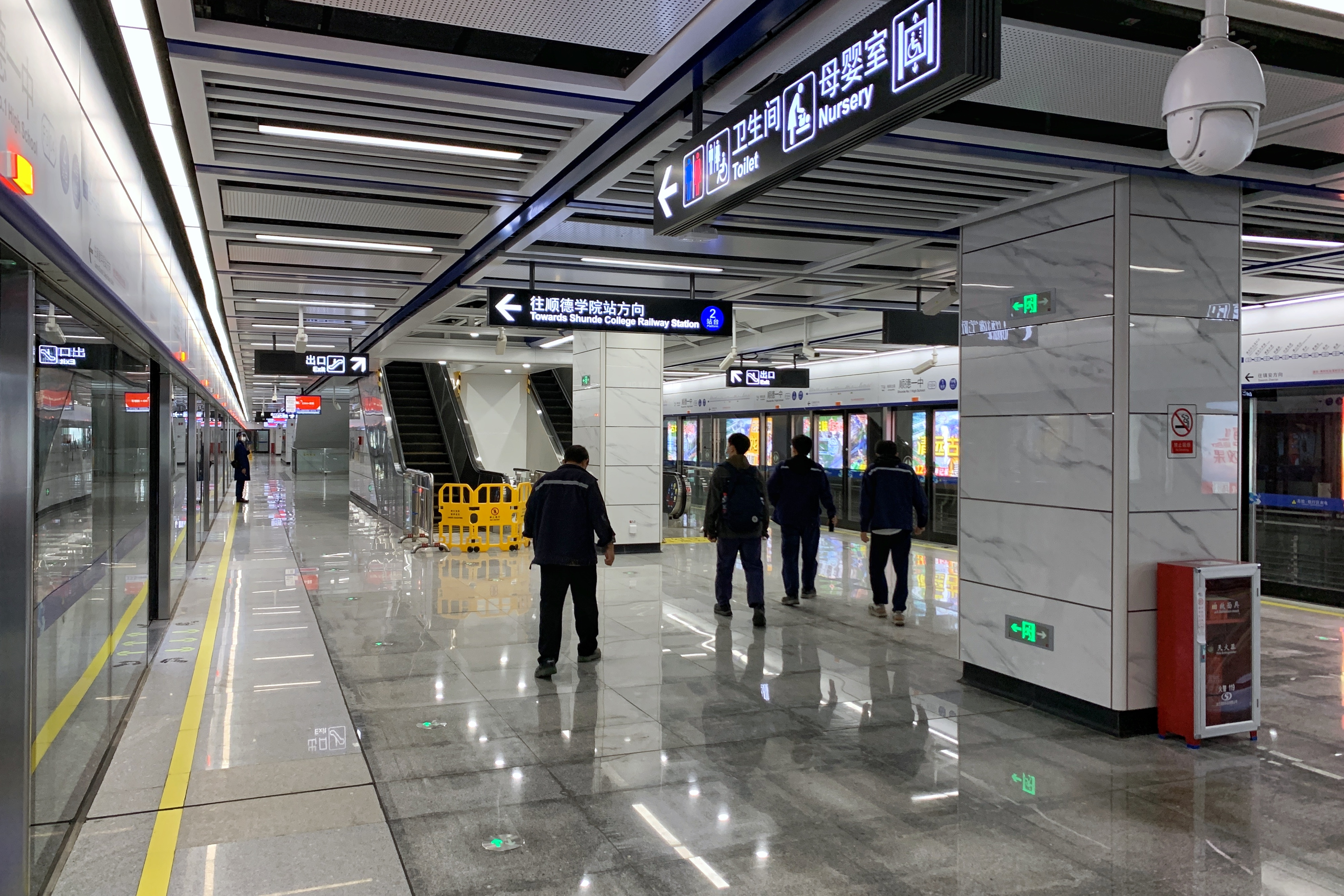
- Platform

Chinese name
- Chinese: 顺德一中站
Transcriptions
Standard Mandarin
- Hanyu Pinyin: Shùndé Yīzhōng Zhàn
Yue: Cantonese
- Yale Romanization: Seuhndāk Yātjūng Jaahm
- Jyutping: Seon^{6}dak^{1} jat^{1}zung^{1} Zaam^{6}

General information
- Location: Dezhi Road (德智路) between Park Boulevard (公园大道) and Bigui Road (碧桂路), Daliang Subdistrict; Shunde District, Foshan, Guangdong; China
- Coordinates: 22°50′7.76″N 113°17′19.46″E
- Operator: Foshan Metro Operation Co., Ltd.
- Line: Line 3
- Platforms: 2 (1 island platform)
- Tracks: 2

Construction
- Structure type: Underground
- Accessible: Yes

Other information
- Station code: F304

History
- Opened: 28 December 2022 (3 years ago)

Services
Preceding station	Foshan Metro	Following station
Jurong Beilu towards Foshan University	Line 3	Shunde OCT Harbour PLUS towards Shunde College Railway Station
Location

Shunde No.1 High School station (Chinese: 顺德一中站; pinyin: Shùndé Yīzhōng Zhàn; Cantonese Yale: Seuhndāk Yātjūng Jaahm) is a station on Line 3 of Foshan Metro, located in Foshan's Shunde District. It opened on 28 December 2022.

== Station layout ==
The station has an island platform under Dezhi Road.

G	-	Exits A & C
L1; Concourse	Lobby	Ticket Machines, Customer Service, Shops, Police Station, Security Facilities
L2; Platforms	Platform 1	3 towards Foshan University (Jurong Beilu)
L2; Platforms	Island platform, doors will open on the left
L2; Platforms	Platform 2	3 towards Shunde College Railway Station (Shunde OCT Harbour PLUS)

=== Entrances/exits ===
The station has 2 points of entry/exit, located on the north and south sides of Dezhi Road. Exit A is equipped with an elevator.

- A: Bigui Road
- C: Dezhi Road

== History ==
The station was called Creative Park station during the planning and construction phase. It was renamed to Shunde No. 1 High School station in 2022.

The main structure of the station was topped out on 19 November 2019 and handled over to mechanical and electrical construction on 2 April 2021. The left line tunnel from this station to Jurong Beilu broke through on 28 August 2020. The double line tunnel to Fengsha station (now Shunde OCT Harbour PLUS broke through on 23 May 2021. On 31 July 2022, the site passed the project acceptance. On 28 December the same year, the station opened with the opening of Line 3.
