= Shunde OCT Harbour PLUS station =

Foshan Metro Line 3 station

Shunde OCT Harbour PLUS 顺德欢乐海岸
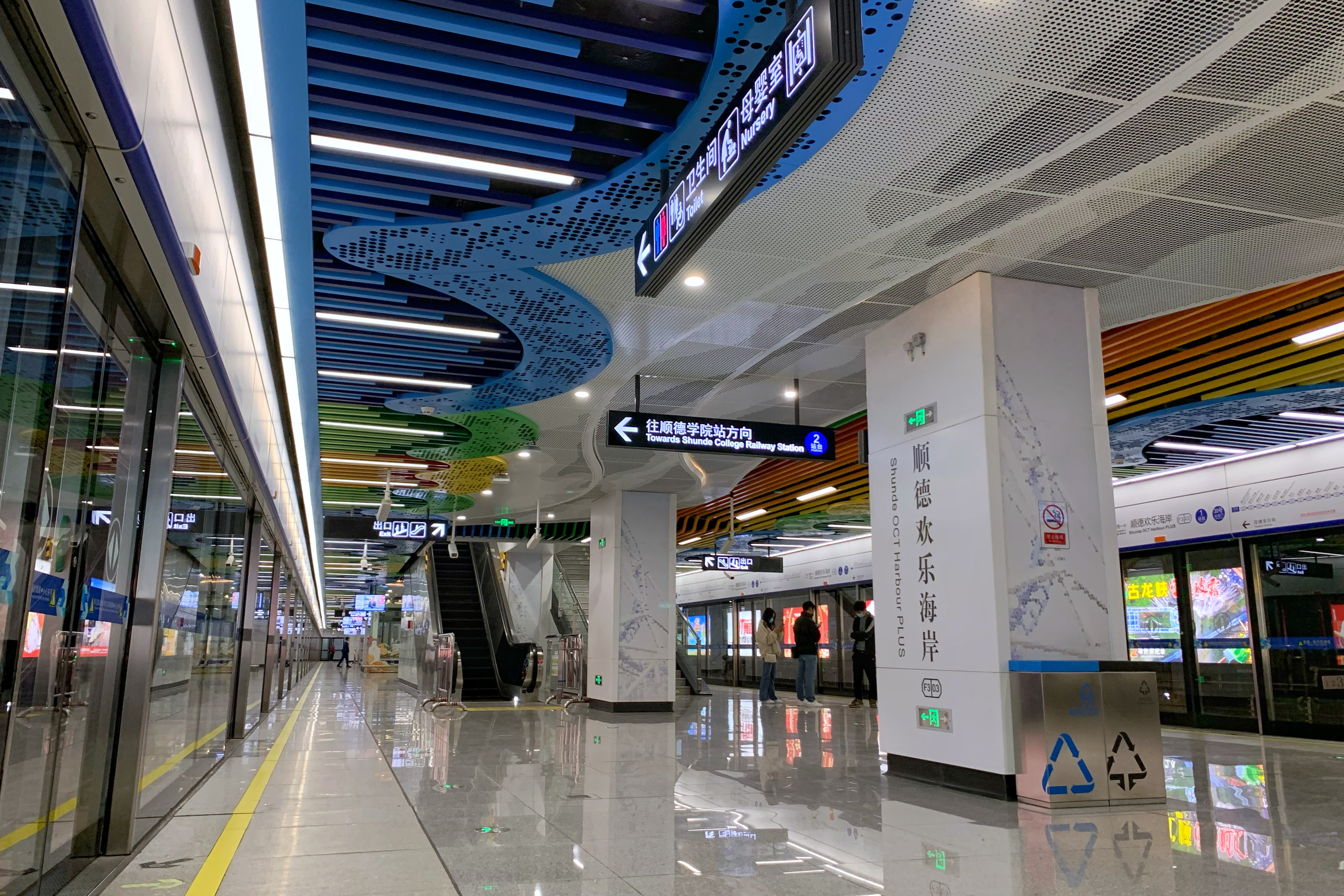
- Platform

Chinese name
- Simplified Chinese: 顺德欢乐海岸站
- Traditional Chinese: 順德歡樂海岸站
Transcriptions
Standard Mandarin
- Hanyu Pinyin: Shùndé Huānlè Hǎiàn Zhàn
Yue: Cantonese
- Yale Romanization: Seuhndāk Fūnlohk Hóiohng Jaahm
- Jyutping: Seon^{6}dak^{1} Fun^{1}lok^{6} Hoi^{2}ngon^{6} Zaam^{6}

General information
- Location: Huanhu Road (环湖路), Daliang Subdistrict; Shunde District, Foshan, Guangdong; China
- Coordinates: 22°49′18.05″N 113°18′5.33″E
- Operator: Foshan Metro Operation Co., Ltd.
- Line: Line 3
- Platforms: 2 (1 island platform)
- Tracks: 2

Construction
- Structure type: Underground
- Accessible: Yes

Other information
- Station code: F303

History
- Opened: 28 December 2022 (3 years ago)

Services
Preceding station	Foshan Metro	Following station
Shunde No.1 High School towards Foshan University	Line 3	Shunde College Railway Station Terminus
Location

Shunde OCT Harbour PLUS station (simplified Chinese: 顺德欢乐海岸站; traditional Chinese: 順德歡樂海岸站; pinyin: Shùndé Huānlè Hǎiàn Zhàn; Cantonese Yale: Seuhndāk Fūnlohk Hóiohng Jaahm) is a station on Line 3 of Foshan Metro, located in Foshan's Shunde District. It opened on 28 December 2022.

== Station theme ==
This station is one of the featured stations of the initial section of Line 3. The station presents the atmosphere of an amusement park by extracting the cultural elements of the surrounding attractions and the curved elements of the coastline.

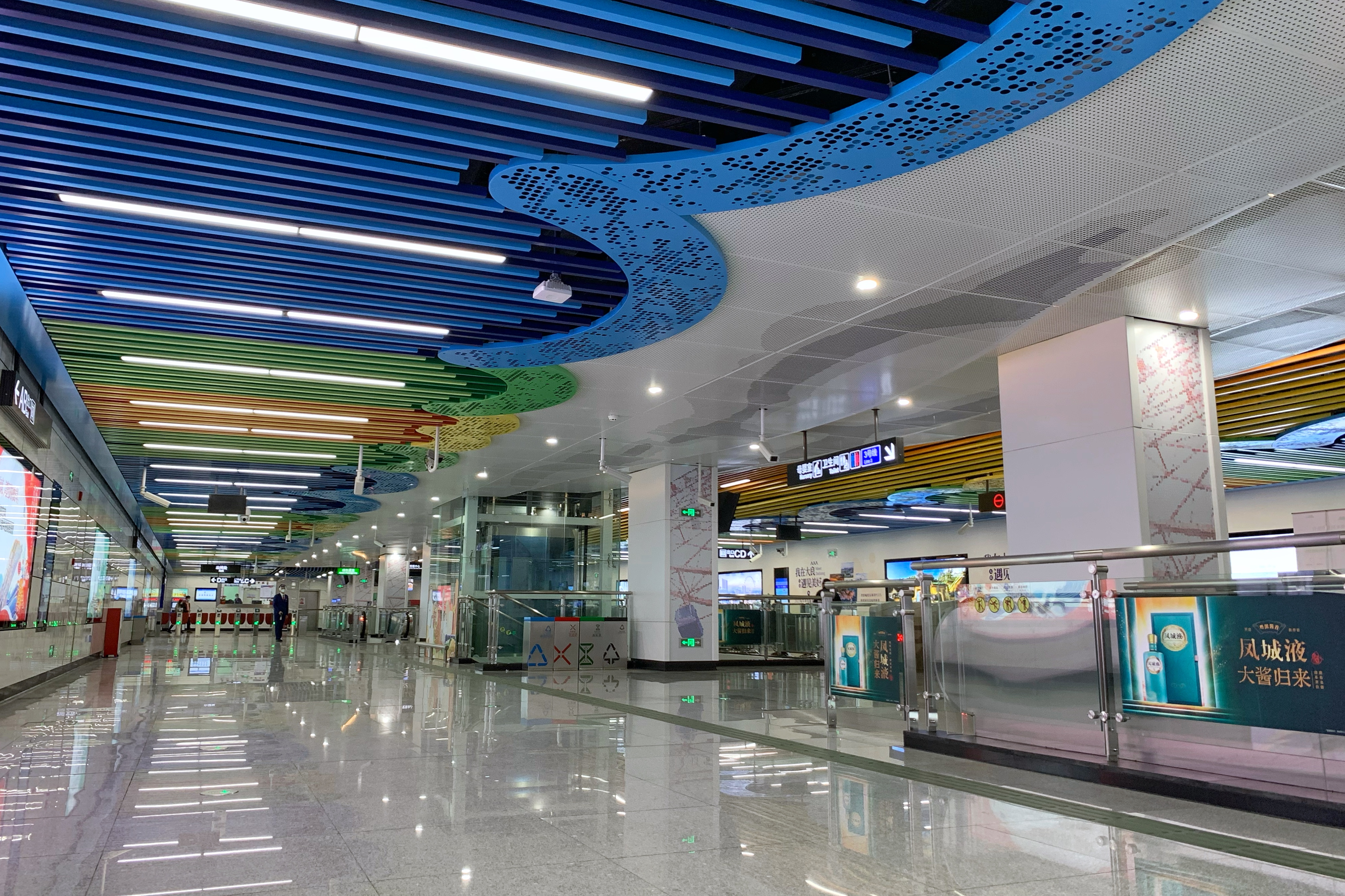
Concourse with station theme

== Station layout ==
The station has an island platform under Huanhu Road.

G	-	Exits A-D
L1; Concourse	Lobby	Ticket Machines, Customer Service, Shops, Police Station, Security Facilities
L2; Platforms	Platform 1	3 towards Foshan University (Shunde No.1 High School)
L2; Platforms	Island platform, doors will open on the left
L2; Platforms	Platform 2	3 towards Shunde College Railway Station (terminus)

=== Entrances/exits ===
The station has 4 points of entry/exit, lettered A-D, located on both the north and south sides of Huanhu Road. Exits A and C are equipped with elevators.

- A: Huanle Boulevard, OCT Happy Coast PLUS
- B: Huanle Boulevard
- C: Huanle Boulevard
- D: Huanle Boulevard

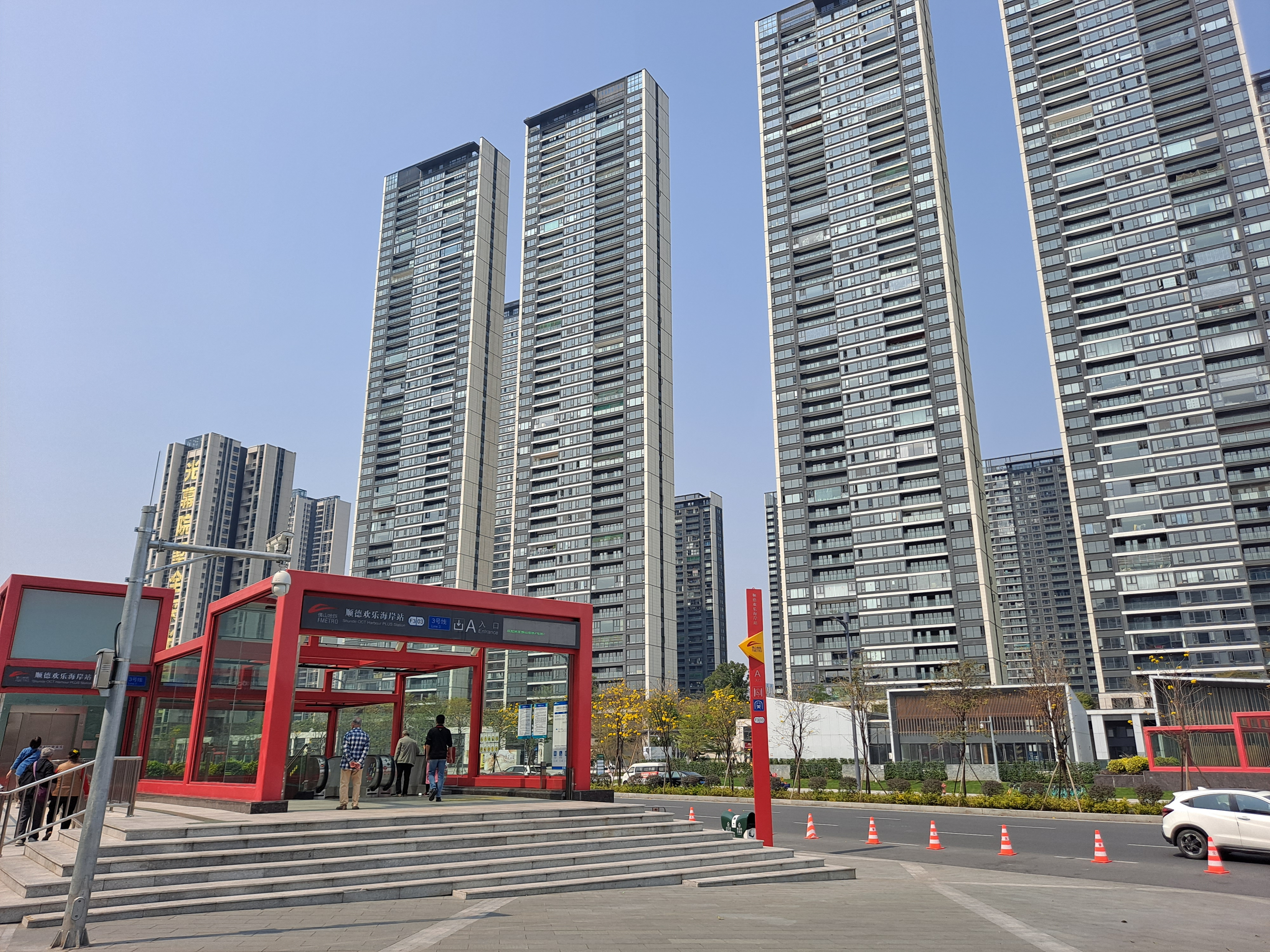
Entrance A

== History ==
The station was called Fengsha station in the planning and construction phase. It was renamed to Shunde OCT Harbour PLUS station in 2022, named after the OCT Harbour PLUS Scenic Area adjacent to the station.

When Line 3 was approved in 2012, the station was set up on the south side of Fengsha Village. In 2015, the planning of Line 3 was adjusted, and the station was moved to the west side of Fengsha Village. The relevant adjustment plan was approved by the Guangdong Provincial Development and Reform Commission on 28 March 2019.

The main structure of the station was topped out on 16 December 2019 and handed over to mechanical and electrical construction on 19 March 2021. On 23 May 2021, the double line tunnel between this station and Creative Park station (now Shunde No.1 High School station) successfully broke through. On 31 July 2022, the site passed the project acceptance. On 28 December the same year, the station opened with the opening of Line 3.
