= Sunten =

Sunten Electric Equipment Co. Ltd.
- Company type: S.A.
- Industry: Manufacturer
- Founded: 1988
- Headquarters: Honggang Indu. Zone, Daliang, Shunde, Foshan, Guangdong, China
- Products: Dry Type Transformer, Dry Type Reactor, Electronic & Power Package Equipment, Pre-fabricated Substation, Switchgear Packaged Device
- Revenue: USD 10,000,001 - 50,000,000
- Number of employees: Above 1000
- Website: sunten website

Sunten Electric Equipment Co., Ltd. is a S.A. manufacturing corporation of the People's Republic of China, founded in 1988 that specializes in electrical equipment for the power grid including cast resin dry-type transformers, pre-fabricated substations, package substations, combined transformers, and switchgears. Its logo is composed with three intersecting chevrons with the three broad ends of their stripes opening skywards.

== History ==
In 1988 Shunde Special Transformer Works was founded in Shunde, Guangdong, China. Shunde Special Transformer Works designed and produced the first cast-resin thin-insulation transformer of China in 1989 and was designated as the Nation's High-Tech Enterprise by the National Science Committee.

== Awards ==
- Outstanding Supplier for Three Gorges Project
- 2001 Manufacture of Machinery Industry in China
- Management Model Enterprise of Statel Mechanical Industry Bureau
- Promise-Keeping Certificate
- Promise-Keeping Certificate for Last Ten Years
- Guangdong Provincial User Satisfied Product Certificate
- The Certificate for Key State Torch Planning Project
- State Predominant New Product of Dry Type Transformer
- Credible High & New Technology Enterprise Certificate
- Statel High & New Technology Enterprise Certificate
- Guangdong Famous Brand Certificate
- Guangdong Name Brand Product Certificate
- Top 10 Chinese Brand for Electrical Equipment Certificate
- The First of Quality satisfaction and Brand Popularity
- 95 National Technology Reconstruction Outstanding Project in Dry Type Rectifying Transformer
- WYBF1-35/10(6) Unmanned Prefabricated Substation
- The Most Famous Brand in the Transformer Industry
- Outstanding Supplier for State Electric Power Distribution Center Model Project
- Outstanding Supplier of Line 2# of Guangzhou Metro Subway Project
