= Qinghui Garden =

Garden in Foshan, China

Coordinates: 22°50′8.50″N 113°15′20.75″E

- 清晖园 (Japanese)
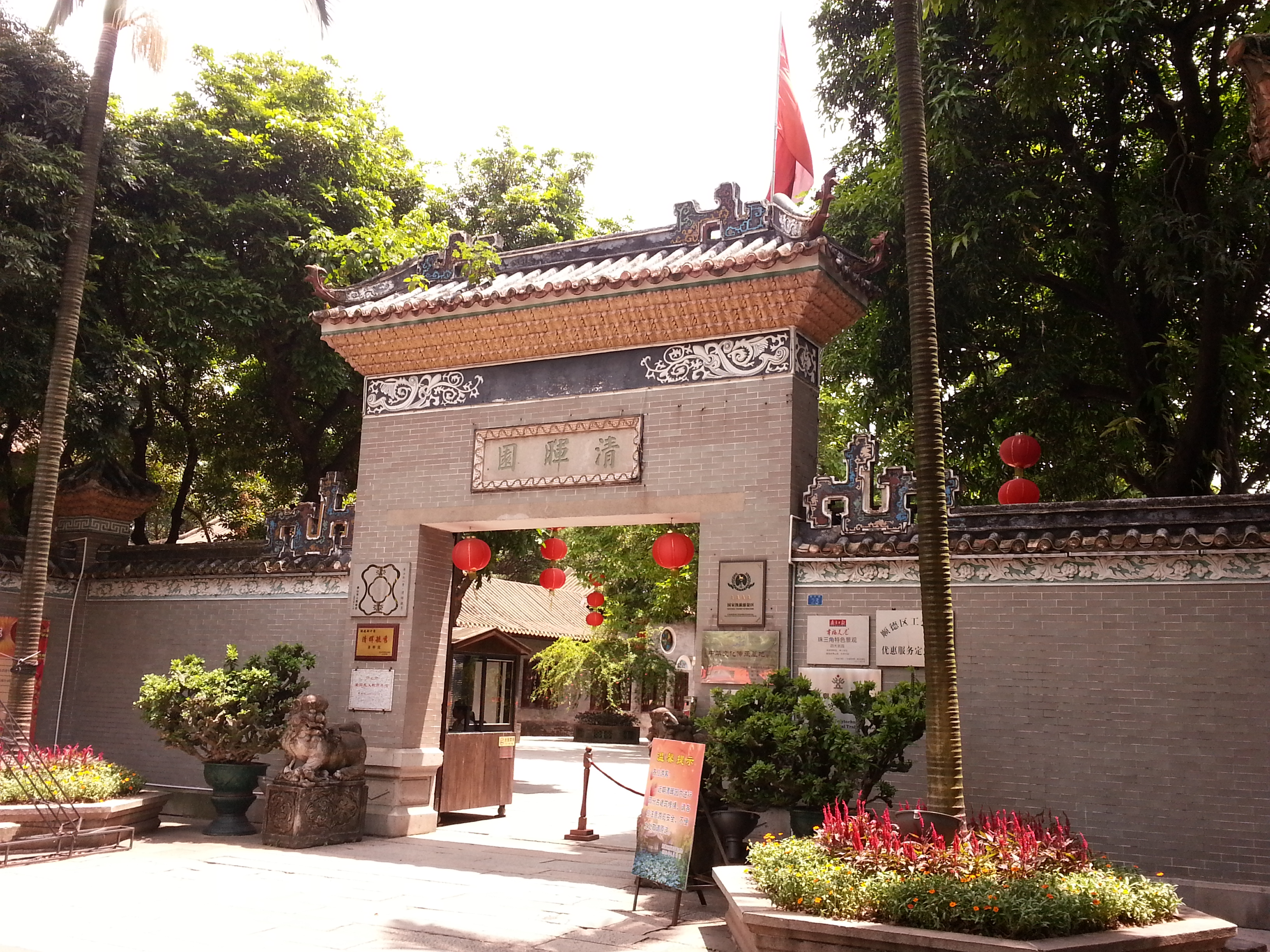
- The east gate of Qing Hui Yuan
- Interactive map of Qinghui Garden
- Location: Shunde District

Site notes
- Area: 22,000 m^{2} (240,000 sq ft)
- Public access: yes
- Website: http://www.qinghuiyuan.com/

Qinghui Garden (Chinese: 清晖园; pinyin: qīnghuīyuán; Jyutping: cing^{1} fai^{1} jyun^{4}; lit. 'Garden of Pure Splendor'), located in Daliang, Shunde District, Foshan City, is one of the Four Great Gardens of Guangdong in China.

== See also ==
- List of Chinese gardens
