= Shunde College Railway Station (Foshan Metro) =

Foshan Metro Line 3 station

Shunde College Railway Station 顺德学院站
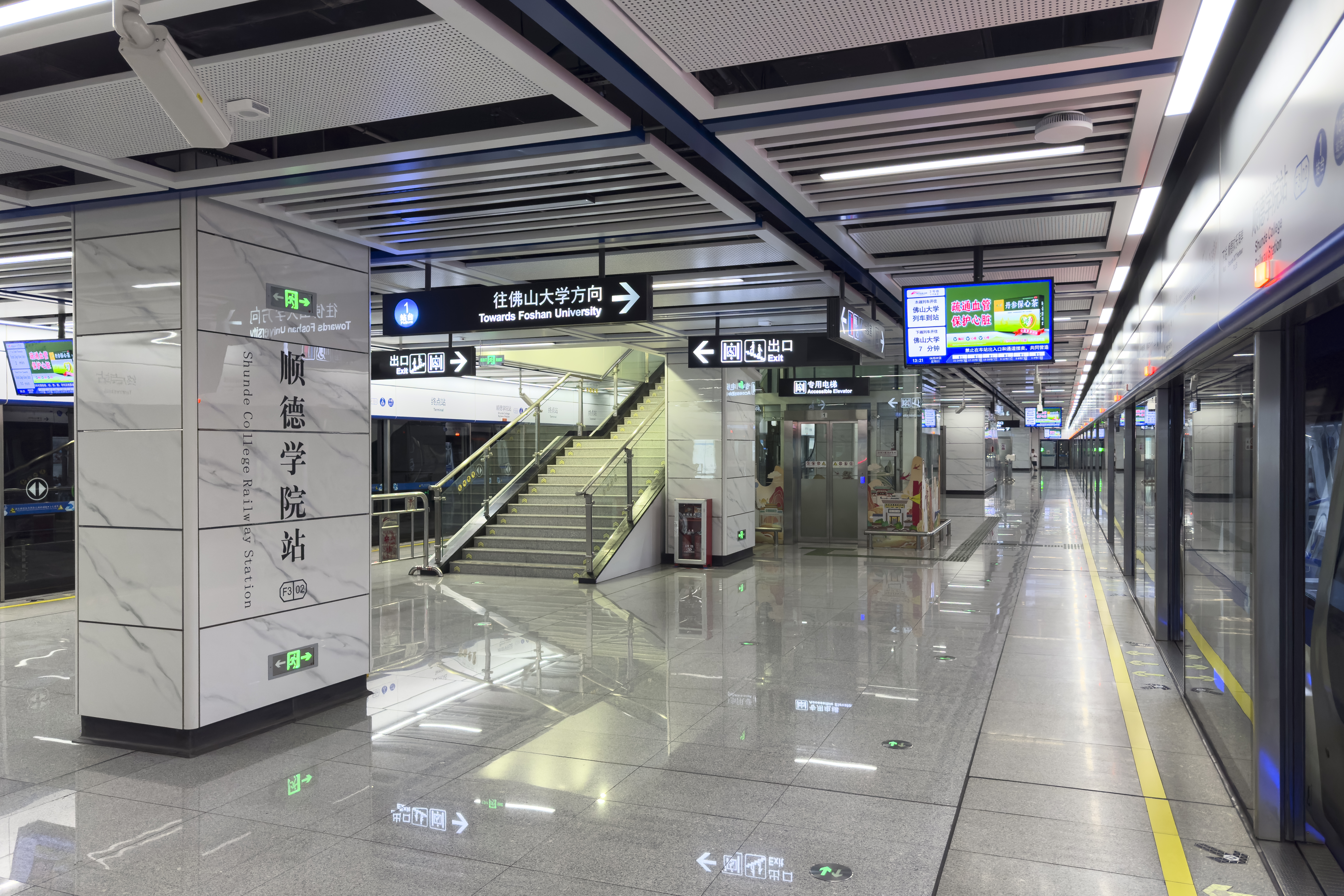
- Platform

Chinese name
- Simplified Chinese: 顺德学院站
- Traditional Chinese: 順德學院站
Transcriptions
Standard Mandarin
- Hanyu Pinyin: Shùndé Xuéyuàn Zhàn
Yue: Cantonese
- Yale Romanization: Seuhndāk Hohkyún Jaahm
- Jyutping: Seon^{6} dak^{1} hok^{6} jyun^{2} Zaam^{6}

General information
- Location: Longpan North Road (龙盘北路), Daliang Subdistrict; Shunde District, Foshan, Guangdong; China
- Coordinates: 22°49′17.83″N 113°18′46.4″E
- Operator: Foshan Metro Operation Co., Ltd.
- Line: Line 3
- Platforms: 2 (1 island platform)
- Tracks: 2
- Connections: Shundexueyuan railway station

Construction
- Structure type: Underground
- Accessible: Yes

Other information
- Station code: F302

History
- Opened: 28 December 2022 (3 years ago)

Services
Preceding station	Foshan Metro	Following station
Shunde OCT Harbour PLUS towards Foshan University	Line 3	Terminus
Transfer at Shunde Polytechnic
Preceding station	Pearl River Delta Metropolitan Region Intercity Railway	Following station
Shunde towards Guangzhou South	Guangzhou–Zhuhai intercity railway transfer at Shunde Polytechnic	Ronggui towards Zhuhai

Future services
Preceding station	Foshan Metro	Following station
Future services
Shunde OCT Harbour PLUS towards Foshan University	Line 3	Shunde Port Terminus
Location

Shunde College Railway Station (simplified Chinese: 顺德学院站; traditional Chinese: 順德學院站; pinyin: Shùndé Xuéyuàn Zhàn; Cantonese Yale: Seuhndāk Hohkyún Jaahm; lit. 'Shunde Polytechnic railway station') is a station on Line 3 of Foshan Metro, located in Foshan's Shunde District. It opened on 28 December 2022, and is the southern terminus of the line. It is also both the southernmost and easternmost station of the Foshan Metro.

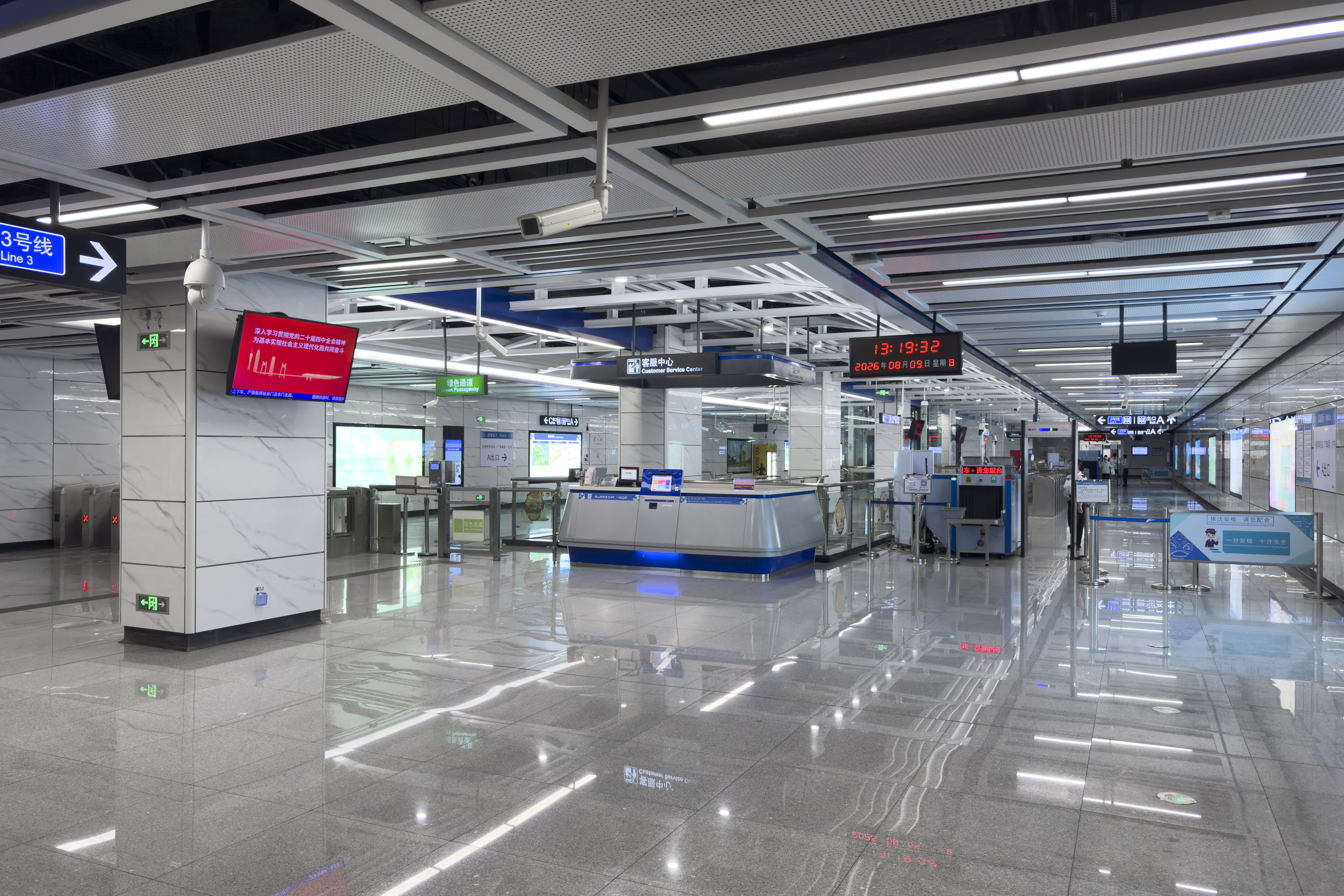
Concourse

== Station layout ==
The station has an underground island platform near Longpan North Road.

G	-	Exits A & C
L1; Concourse	Lobby	Ticket Machines, Customer Service, Shops, Police Station, Security Facilities
L2; Platforms	Platform 1	3 towards Foshan University (Shunde OCT Harbour PLUS)
L2; Platforms	Island platform, doors will open on the left
L2; Platforms	Platform 2	3 termination platform

=== Entrances/exits ===
The station has 2 points of entry/exit, lettered A and C. Both are equipped with elevators. In the future, Exits B and D will be implemented.

- A: Longpan North Road
- C: Longpan North Road
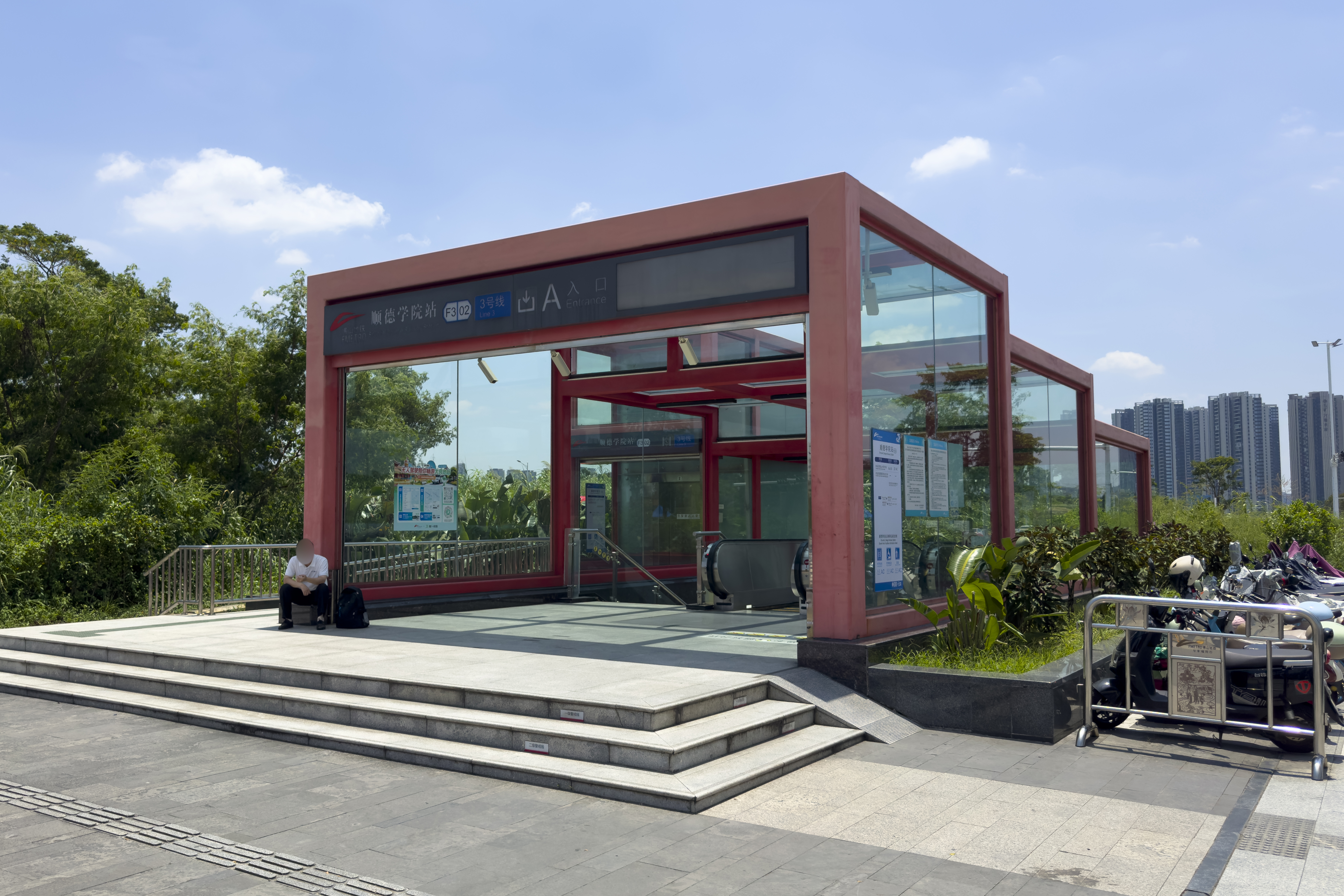
Entrance A

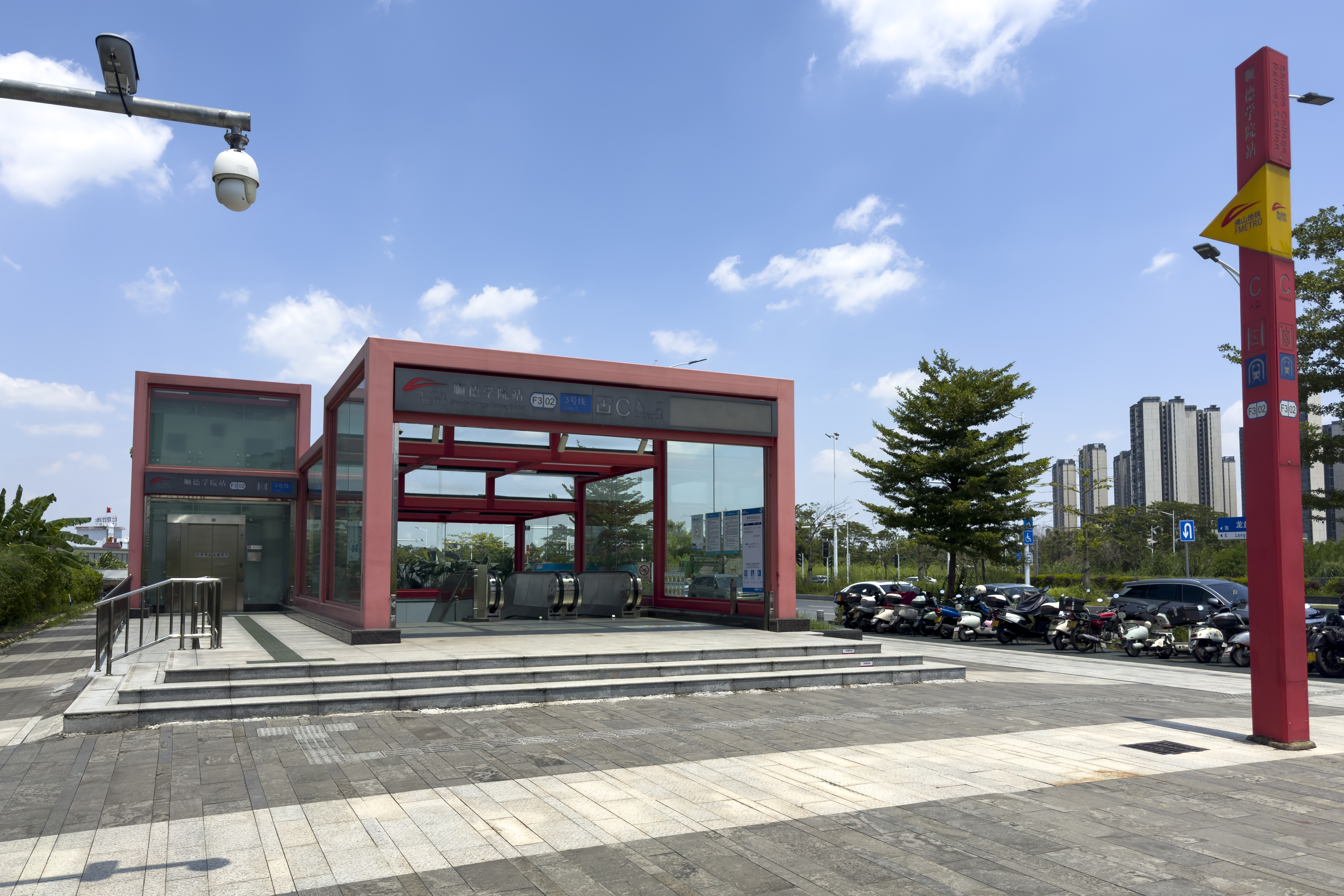
Entrance C

== History ==
Line 3 did not have this station when it was approved in 2012. In 2015, Line 3 changed its planned alignment, adding this station to connect to the Guangzhou–Zhuhai intercity railway and named Shunde College station. The relevant adjustment plan was approved by the Guangdong Provincial Development and Reform Commission in March 2019. In 2022, the station was renamed to Shunde but was later adjusted to Shunde College Railway Station before the opening of Line 3 because the name was easily confused with the intercity railway station of the same name, which is more than 7 kilometers away.

On 21 October 2020, the main structure of the first phase of the station was topped out. On 31 July 2022, the station passed the project acceptance. On 28 December the same year, the station opened with the opening of Line 3.

== Future development ==
After the opening of the rear section in the future, Line 3 will be extended to Shunde Port station, and the station will become an intermediate station, where platform 2 will be used in the direction of Shunde Port.

In the future, Line 26 of Guangzhou Metro will also pass through the station, and it will become a transfer station.
