= Daliang Subdistrict =

Daliang Subdistrict 大良街道
- Subdistrict
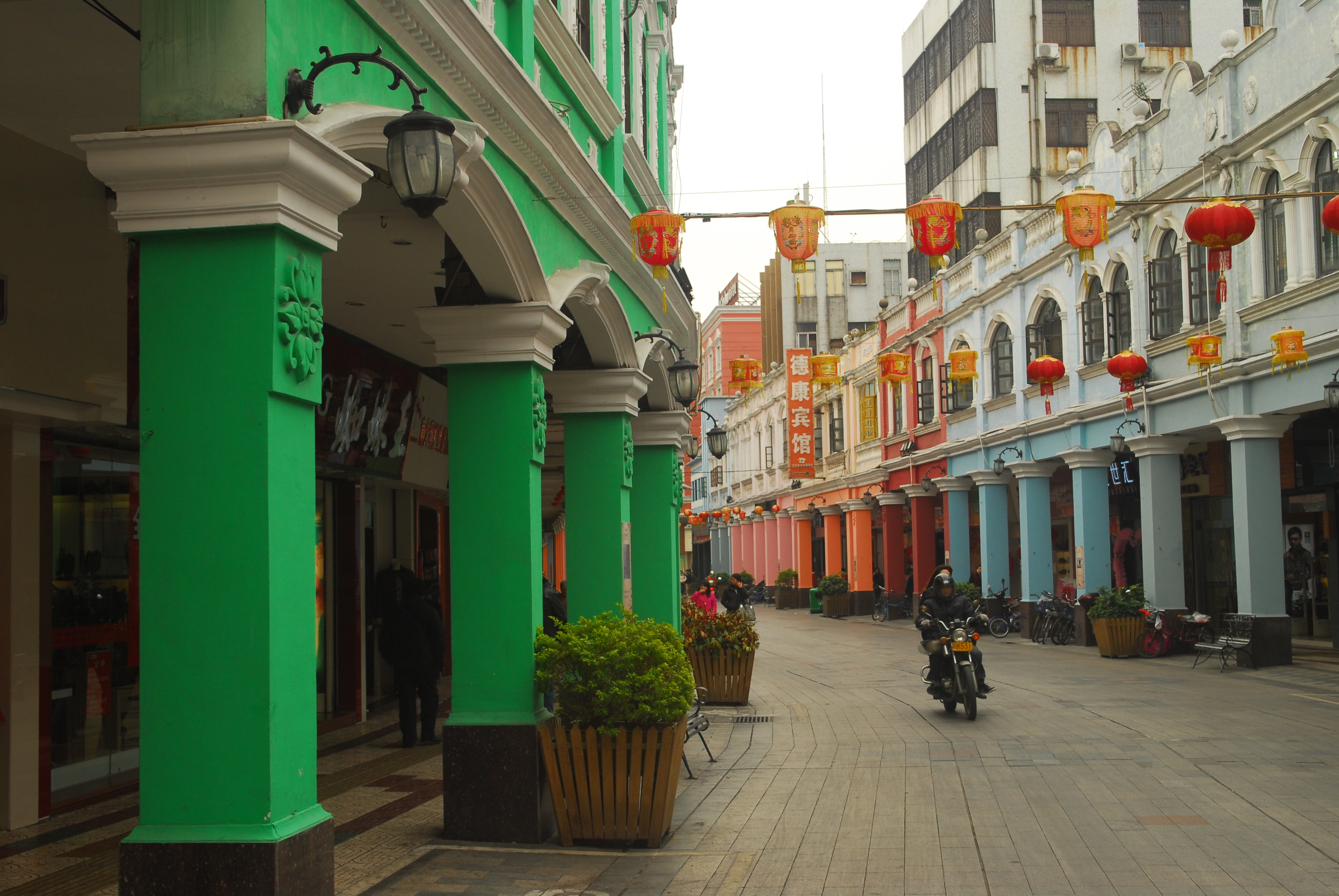
- Huagai Road pedestrian street (华盖路步行街)

- Location of Daliang in Shunde
- Country: China
- Province: Guangdong
- Prefecture: Foshan
- District: Shunde

Area
  - Total: 80.19 km^{2} (30.96 sq mi)

Population
  - Total: 310,000
  - Density: 3,900/km^{2} (10,000/sq mi)
- Time zone: UTC+8 (China Standard)

Daliang Subdistrict

Alternative Chinese name
- Chinese: 大良
- Postal: Taileung
Transcriptions
Standard Mandarin
- Wade–Giles: Ta^{4}-liang^{2}

Daliang Subdistrict (Chinese: 大良街道; pinyin: Dàliáng Jiēdào) is a subdistrict in Shunde, Foshan, Guangdong, China, located to the east of Shunde City. It is the seat of the Shunde municipal government. It has a resident population of 310,000 with its total area of 80 km^{2} (31 sq mi).

== See also ==
- Qing Hui Yuan
- Double skin milk
