= Foshan West Railway Station (Foshan Metro) =

Foshan Metro Line 3 station

Foshan West Railway Station 佛山西站
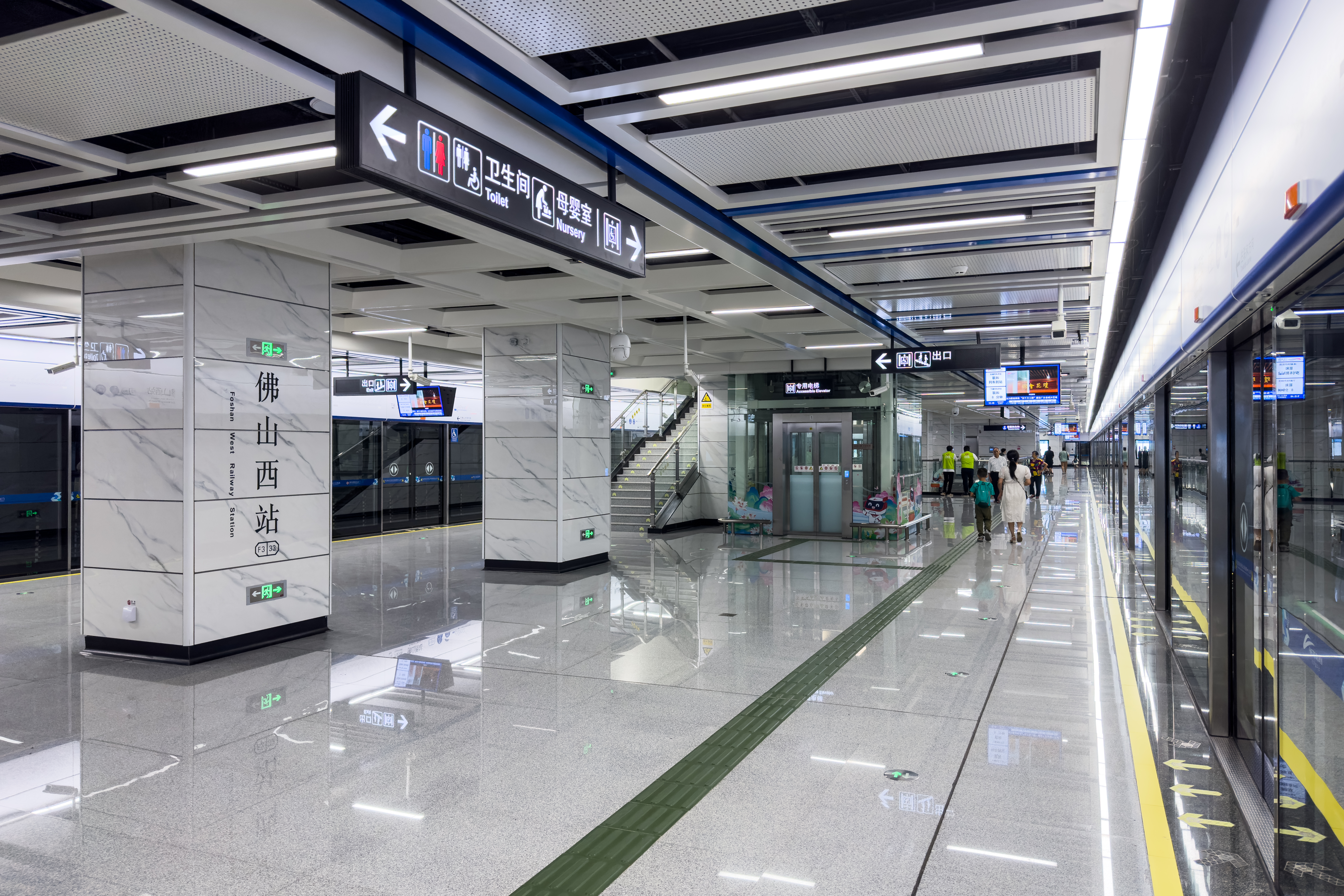
- Line 3 platform

Chinese name
- Chinese: 佛山西站
Transcriptions
Standard Mandarin
- Hanyu Pinyin: Fóshānxī Zhàn
Yue: Cantonese
- Yale Romanization: Fahtsāan Sāi Jaahm
- Jyutping: Fat^{6}saan^{1} Sai^{1} Zaam^{6}

General information
- Location: Underneath Foshan West railway station, Shishan; Nanhai District, Foshan, Guangdong; China
- Coordinates: 23°4′55.60″N 113°1′41.27″E
- Operated by: Foshan Metro Operation Co., Ltd.
- Lines: Line 3 Line 4 (future)
- Platforms: 6 (3 island platforms)
- Tracks: 4
- Connections: Foshan West

Construction
- Structure type: Underground
- Accessible: Yes

Other information
- Station code: F333

History
- Opened: 23 August 2024 (22 months ago)

Services
Preceding station	Foshan Metro	Following station
Xingye Donglu towards Foshan University	Line 3	Luocun towards Shunde College Railway Station
Location

Foshan West Railway Station (Chinese: 佛山西站; pinyin: Fóshānxī Zhàn; Cantonese Yale: Fahtsāan Sāi Jaahm) is a station on Line 3 of Foshan Metro, located in Foshan's Nanhai District underneath Foshan West railway station. It opened on 23 August 2024.

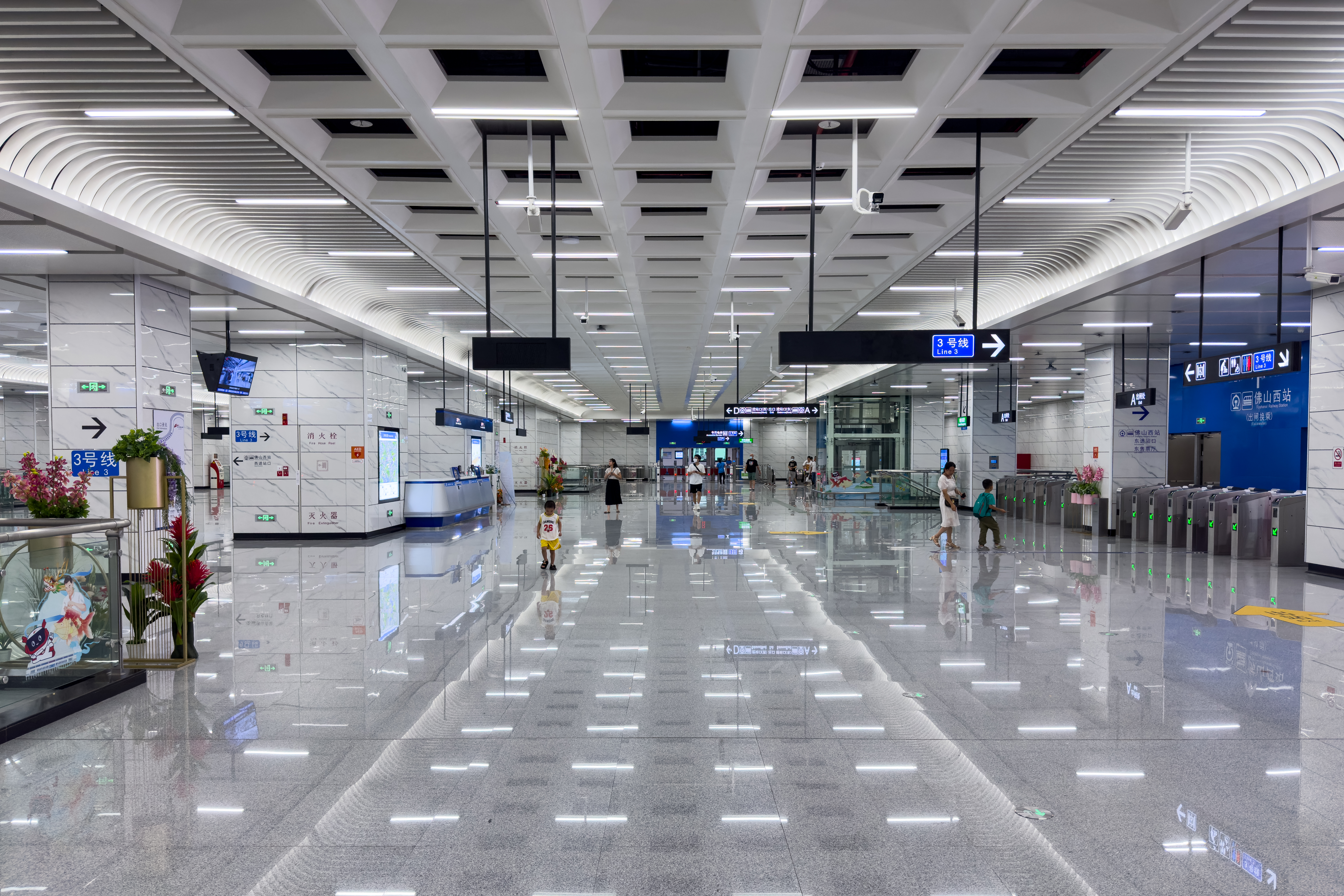
Concourse

== Theme ==
This station is one of the featured stations of the rear section of Line 3, with the design of the concourse adopting the Lingnan architectural style, showing the style "Xiangyunsha silk" of Shunde Lunjiao as the element, extracting its wave form and showing it in the spatial form.

== Station layout ==
The station has 3 island platforms under Foshan West railway station.

L1; Concourse	Lobby	Ticket Machines, Customer Service, Police Station, Security Facilities, Exit A & E
L1; Concourse	Underground Mall	Foshan West Railway Station North and South Sunken Squares, Shops
L2; Platforms	-	Reserved Concourse
L2; Platforms		3 towards Foshan University (Xingye Donglu)
L2; Platforms	Platform 1 Platform 2	Island platform, doors will open on the left
L2; Platforms		3 towards Shunde College Railway Station (Luocun)
L2; Platforms	Island platform, not in use
L2; Platforms		4 reserved track
L2; Platforms	Island platform, not in use
L2; Platforms		4 reserved track
L2; Platforms	-	Reserved Concourse
L3; Reserved Level	-	Future transfer passageway between 3 and 4
L3; Reserved Level	-	Reserved Platforms

=== Entrances/exits ===
Since its initial opening, the station has 2 one-way exits and 4 one-way entrances.

- A: Foshan West Railway Station East/South/North Entrance, East Parking Lot, East Taxi Stand, Bus Station, Foshan West Railway Station South Square
- B, C: (Entry only)
- D: Foshan West Railway Station West/South/North Entrance, West Ticket Hall, West Parking Lot, West Taxi Yard, Online Car-hailing Pick-up and Drop-off Platform, Foshan West Railway Station South Square
- E, F: (Entry only)
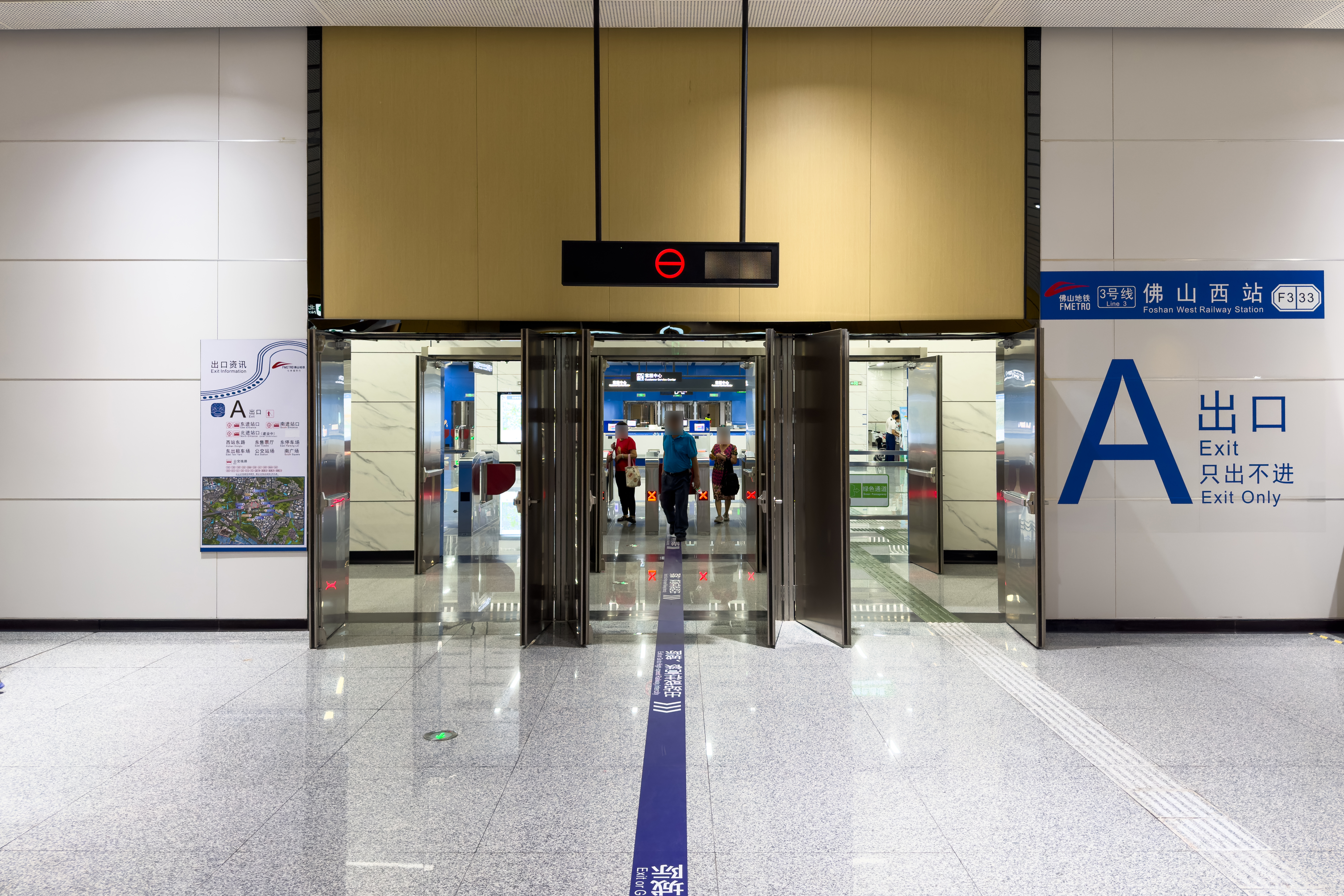
Exit A

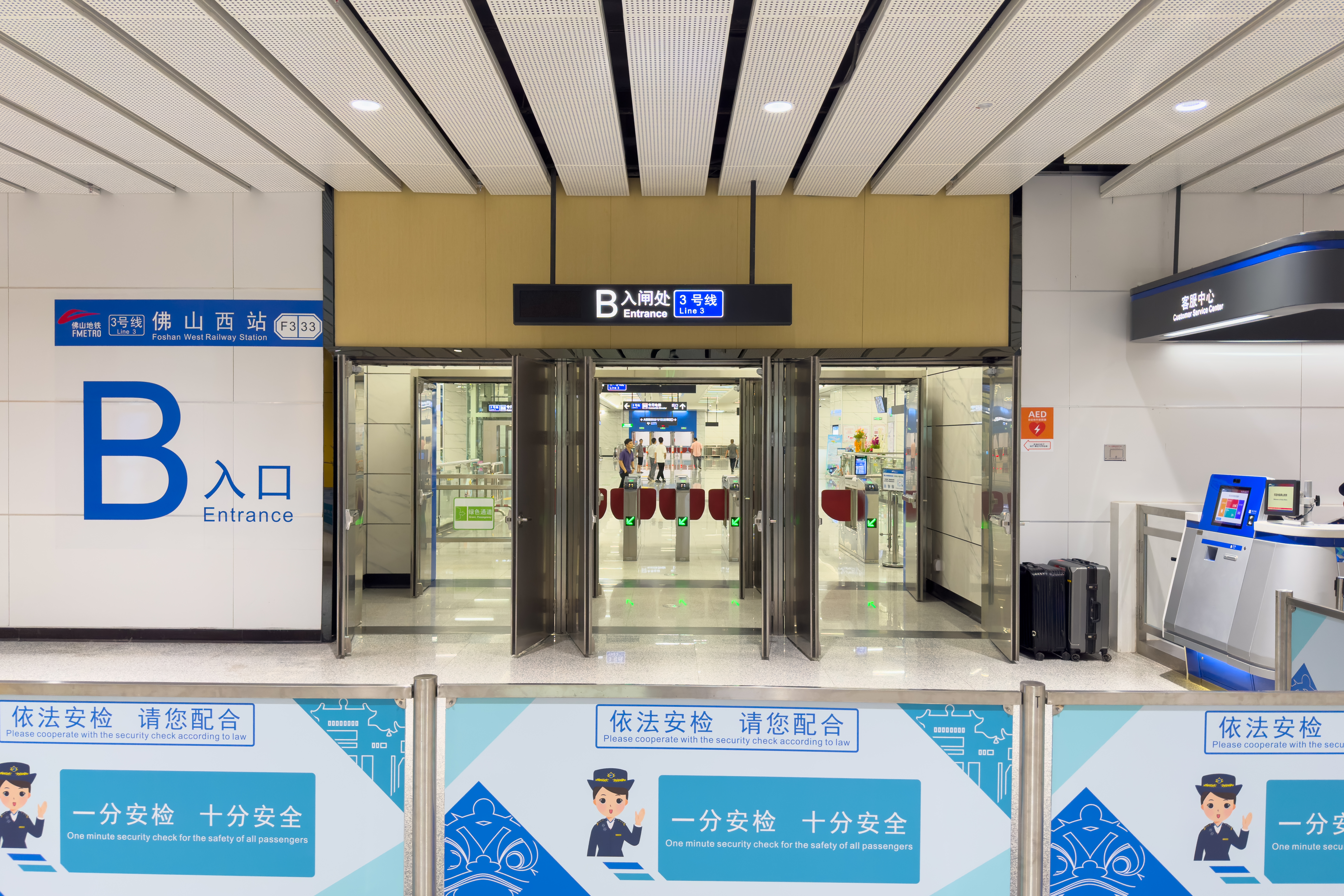
Entrance B

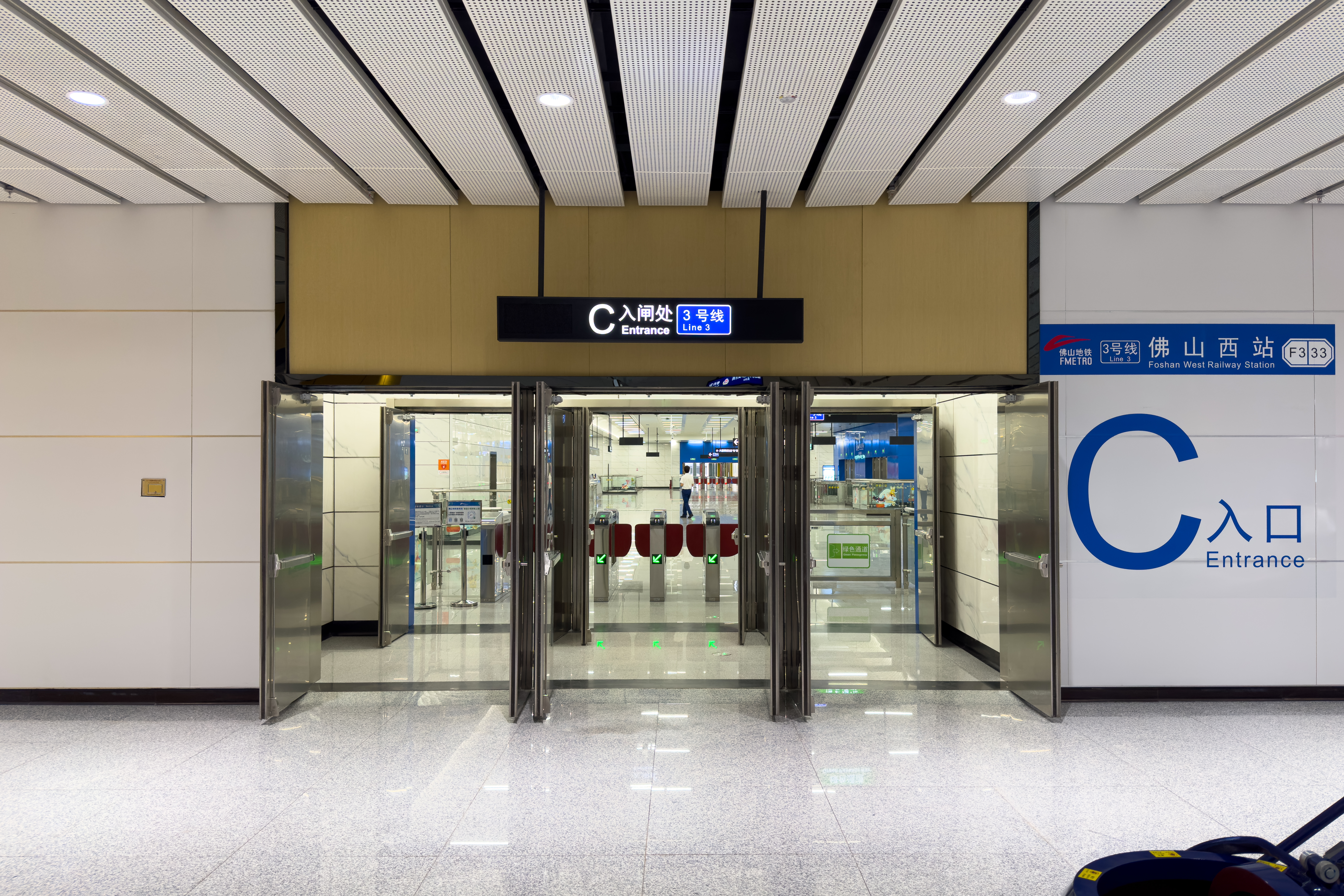
Entrance C

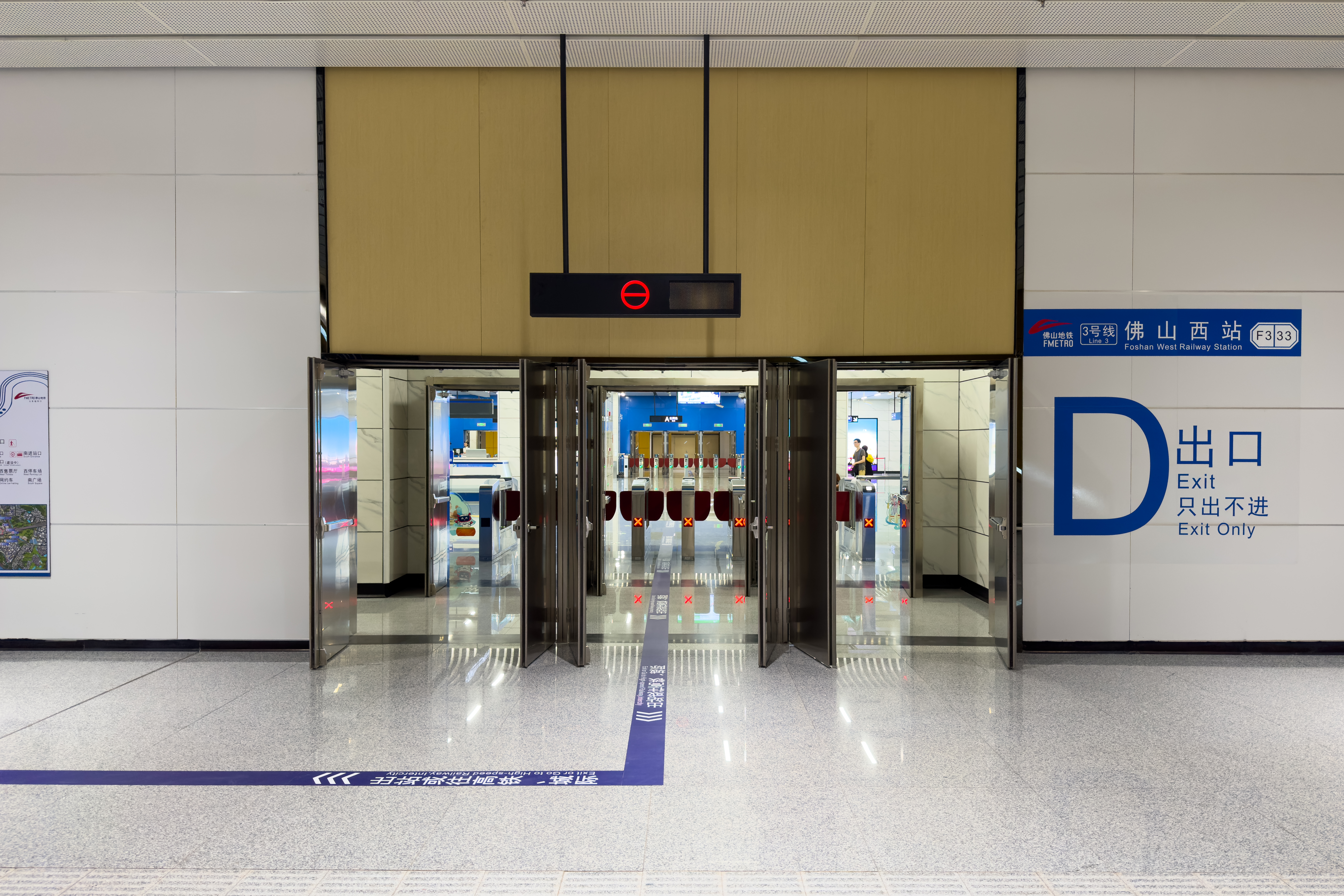
Exit D

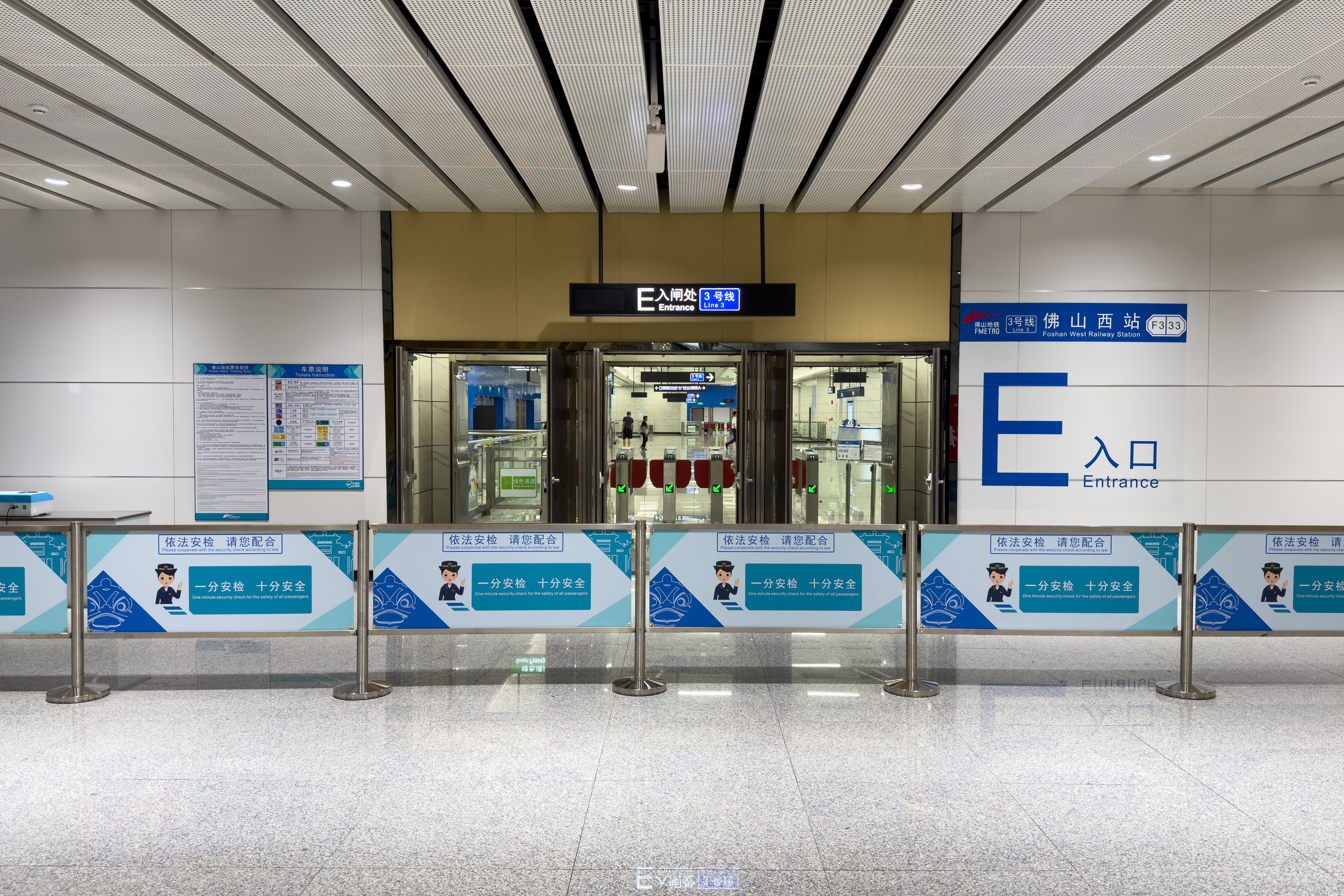
Entrance E

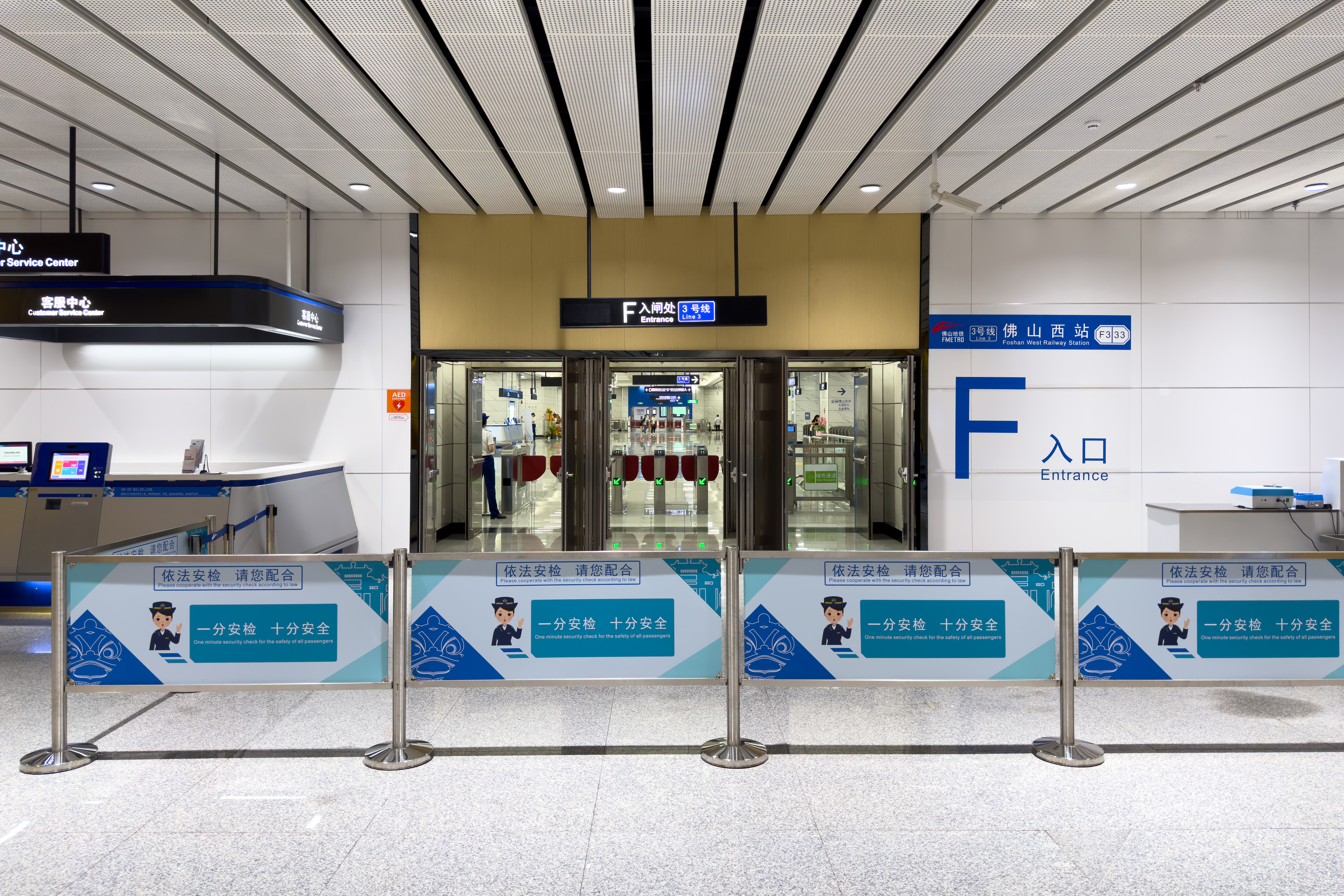
Entrance F

== History ==
At the time of the design of the Foshan West Station of the high-speed railway, it was determined that the metro station would be pre-built in the underground space under the station building. At that time, during the early stage of the "eight-line planning" in Foshan, it was planned that Foshan Metro Line 3 and the original Line 8 would intersect at Foshan West Railway Station, so the subway station was designed as two island platforms, the west island platform was used by Line 8, and the east island platform was used by Line 3. Due to the fact that this station is the terminal station of Line 8 and needs to set up a switchback line, the two lines do not use the same platform transfer design but transfer through the shared concourse. In 2014, Foshan Metro was revised, and the current Line 4 replaced the original Line 8, and the island platform on the west side was changed to Line 4. Although the station has been changed to an intermediate station on Line 4, the design of the station has not been changed to a parallel transfer between Line 3 and Line 4. Subsequently, the design of the pre-built metro station decided to deepen the station by a floor, and add a transfer passageway under the platform level to connect the two island platforms, separating the flow of transfer passengers from the flow of passengers entering and leaving the station. Subsequently, according to the relevant announcement of the Nanhai Branch of the Foshan Municipal Bureau of Natural Resources, a central island platform was added to the station, which can be used to transfer to the same platform in some directions of Lines 3 and 4.

On 23 August 2024, this station opened with the "Lianhe to Foshan University" section of Line 3. (Note: Prior to opening, it was known as part of the 'rear section' or 'section under construction')

== Future development ==
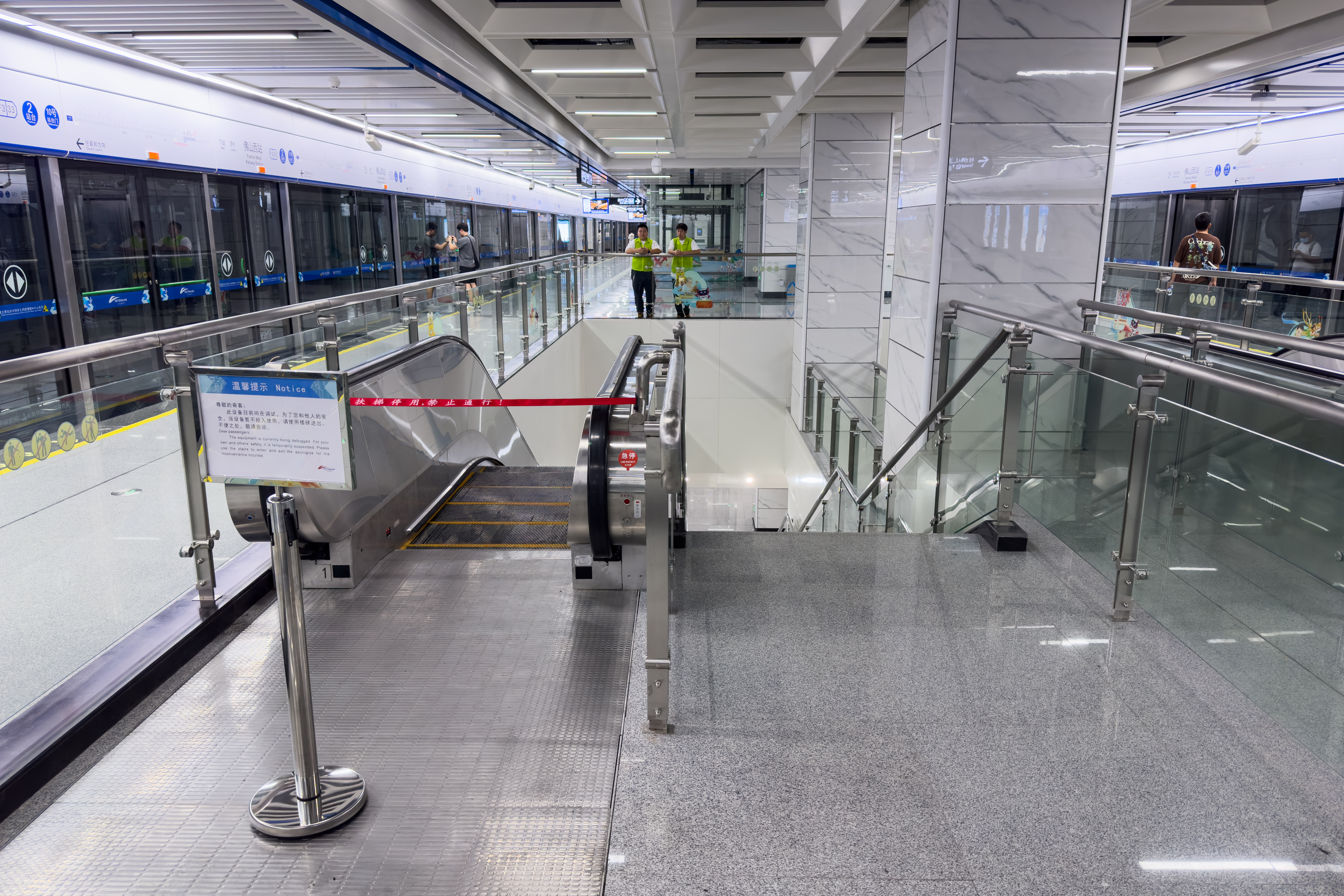
Unopened transfer node from Line 3 to Line 4

In the future, this station will be one of the two interchange stations of between Foshan Metro Line 3 and Line 4. Both lines are parallel, and the two-line station structure has been reserved in the station during the construction of Foshan West Railway Station. According to the platform configuration, the platform of Line 3 in the direction of Shunde Port and the platform of Line 4 in the direction of Beijiang Dadao adopts the Spanish solution, and the doors of both sides will be opened when the train in these two directions arrives at the station. Therefore, passengers arriving at the station by train in these two directions can get off at the central platform and walk to the platform opposite it, and directly transfer to the train in the corresponding direction of the other line to reach the destination. Transfers in other directions require a detour through the transfer tunnel below the platform, or through the concourse. In addition, another station has been built under the north square of Foshan West Railway Station in advance, and a transfer node leading to the platform of the station has been reserved at the central platform of Line 3 and Line 4. The station was originally planned to be used for the branch line of Guangzhou Metro Line 28, but the construction of the branch line of Guangzhou Line 28 has been shelved, and the future ownership and development of the reserved station is still unclear.
