= Dunhou station =

Foshan Metro Line 3 station

Dunhou 敦厚
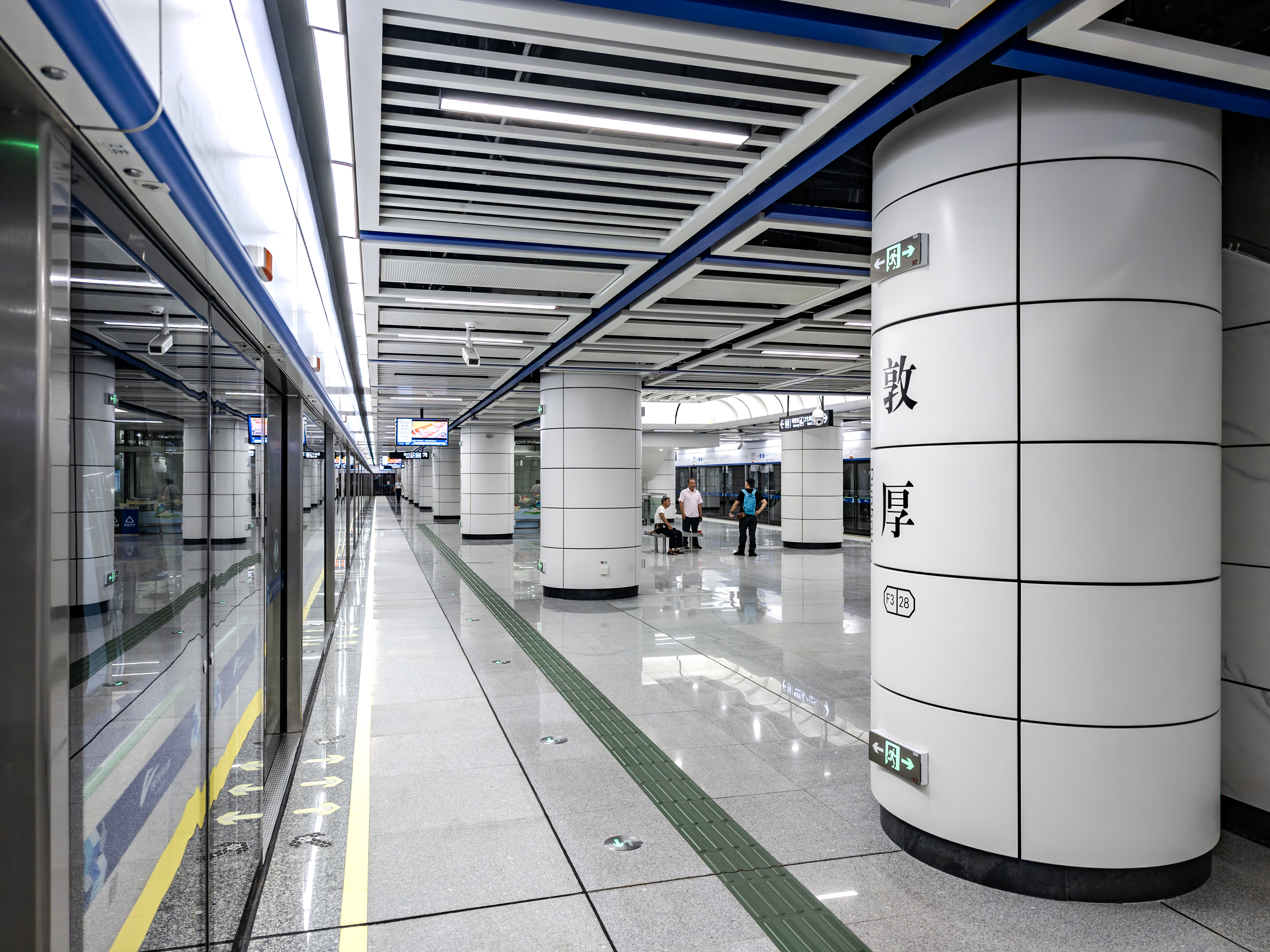
- Platform 1

Chinese name
- Chinese: 敦厚站
Transcriptions
Standard Mandarin
- Hanyu Pinyin: Dūnhòu Zhàn
Yue: Cantonese
- Yale Romanization: Dēunhauh Jaahm
- Jyutping: Deon^{1}hau^{5} Zaam^{6}

General information
- Location: Intersection of Zhanqian Road (站前路) and Wenchang Road (文昌路); Chancheng District, Foshan, Guangdong; China
- Coordinates: 23°3′4.75″N 113°5′53.59″E
- Operator: Foshan Metro Operation Co., Ltd.
- Line: Line 3
- Platforms: 2 (1 island platform)
- Tracks: 2

Construction
- Structure type: Underground
- Accessible: Yes

Other information
- Station code: F328

History
- Opened: 18 June 2026 (57 days ago)
- Former names: Foshan Railway Station (佛山火车站)

Services
Preceding station	Foshan Metro	Following station
Foshan Railway Station towards Foshan University	Line 3	Zhongshan Park towards Shunde College Railway Station
Location

Dunhou station (Chinese: 敦厚站; pinyin: Dūnhòu Zhàn; Cantonese Yale: Dēunhauh Jaahm) is a station on Line 3 of Foshan Metro, located in Foshan's Chancheng District. It opened on 18 June 2026.

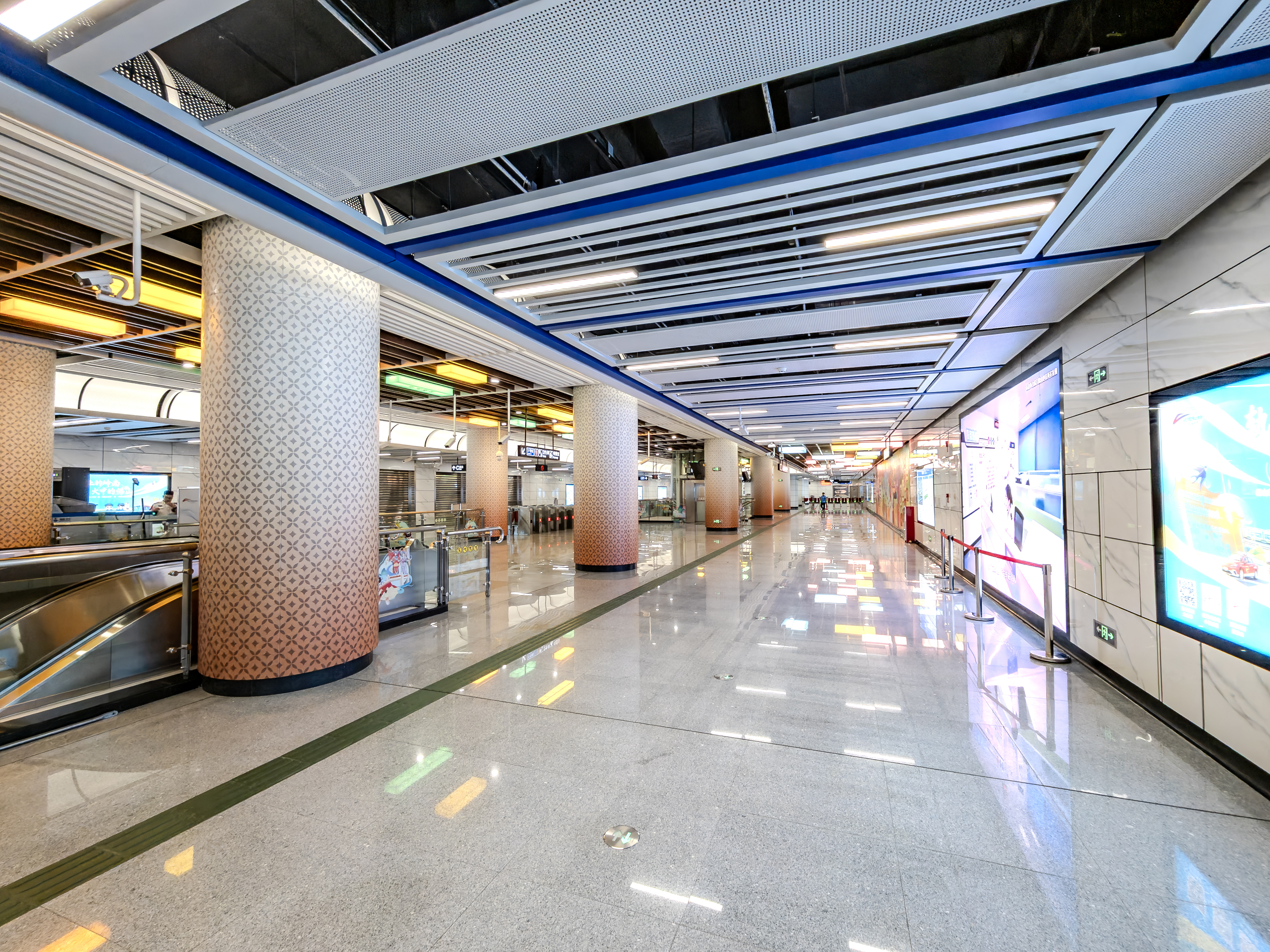
Concourse

== Station layout ==
The station has an island platform under Zhanqian Road. It also has reservations for a future interchange with Line 5.

G	-	Exits A-C
L1; Concourse	Lobby	Ticket Machines, Customer Service, Shops, Police Station, Security Facilities
L2; Platforms	Platform 1	3 towards Foshan University (Foshan Railway Station)
L2; Platforms	Island platform, doors will open on the left
L2; Platforms	Platform 2	3 towards Shunde College Railway Station (Zhongshan Park)
L3; Reserved Platforms		5 Reserved track area
L3; Reserved Platforms	Reserved Island platform
L3; Reserved Platforms		5 Reserved track area

=== Entrances/exits ===
There are 3 points of entry/exit, located on the north and south sides of Wenchang West Road. Exit A is equipped with an elevator.

- A: Wenchang West Road, Foshan No. 6 Middle School
- B: Wenchang West Road, CIFI Park, Dunhou Village
- C: Wenchang West Road, Vanke Golden Mileage

== History ==
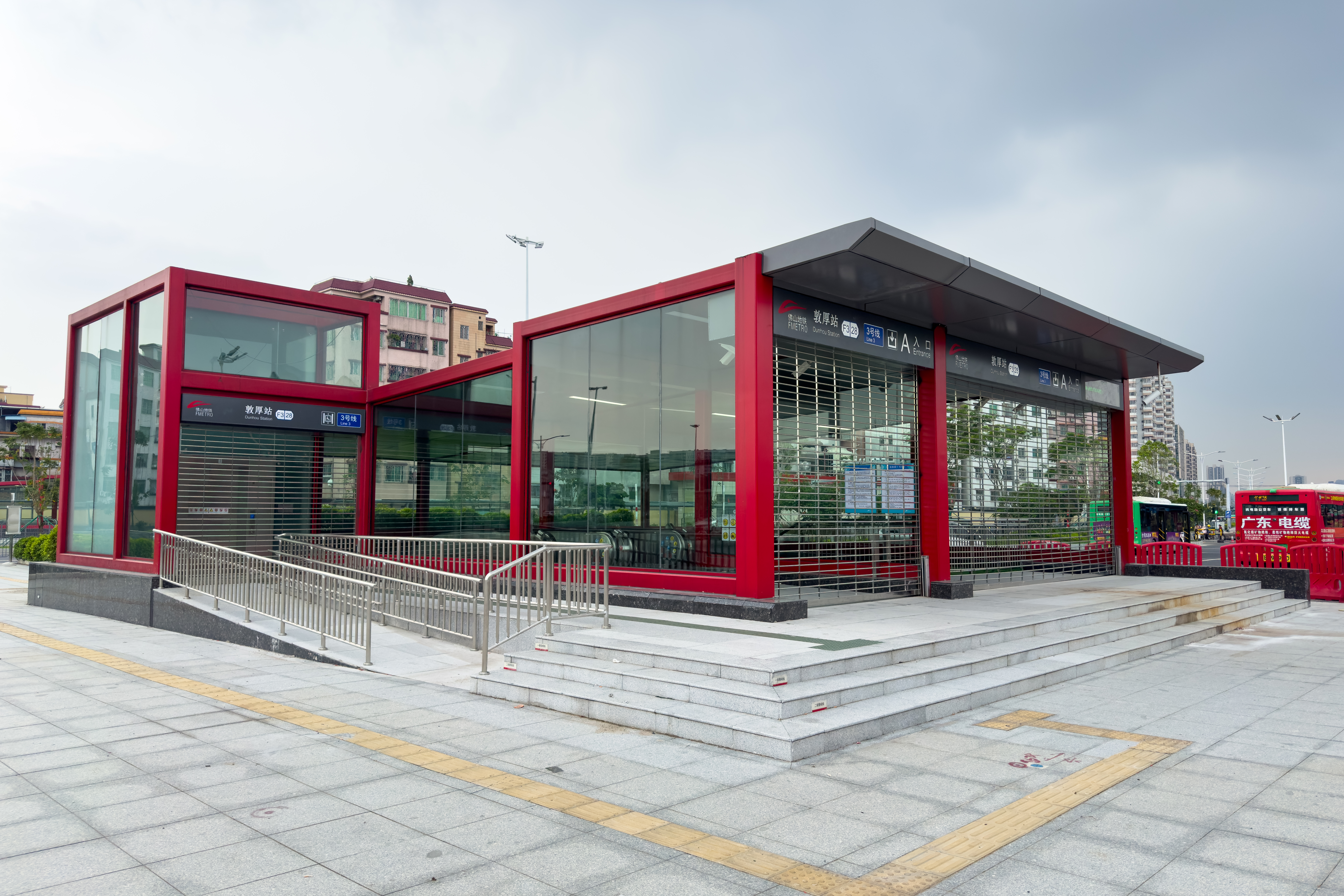
Exit A during the station's unopened state

This station was originally used as a supporting station of Foshan railway station, and was called Foshan Railway Station in the planning and construction stage. In 2022, the Guangzhou–Zhanjiang high-speed railway will not use the existing Foshan station, and instead will build a new station building west of the original Foshan station, and the original Foshan station will be discontinued, so Line 3 will determine to add a station at the new high-speed rail station at the same time, and the station will also be renamed to Dunhou station. On 8 September 2017, the station area began to be fenced. On 22 January 2021, the main structure topped out. On 11 March 2022, the left line tunnel between this station and Zhongshan Park station broke through. On 15 July 2022, the right line tunnel between this station and Guidan Road station (now Lianhe) broke through.

Since the Foshan high-speed railway station metro station (now named Foshan Railway Station) was only added after the construction of Line 3 started for a period of time, the tunnel segments that have been built between Line 3 and this station will be removed during the construction of the station. However, there are no train turnback conditions at this station, so it will not be able to provide services at the beginning of the opening of the rear section of Line 3. With the completion of the Guangzhou-Zhanjiang High-Speed Railway Foshan railway station and the respective metro station meeting the conditions for connection, this station opened on 18 June 2026.
