= Luocun station =

Foshan Metro Line 3 station

Luocun 罗村
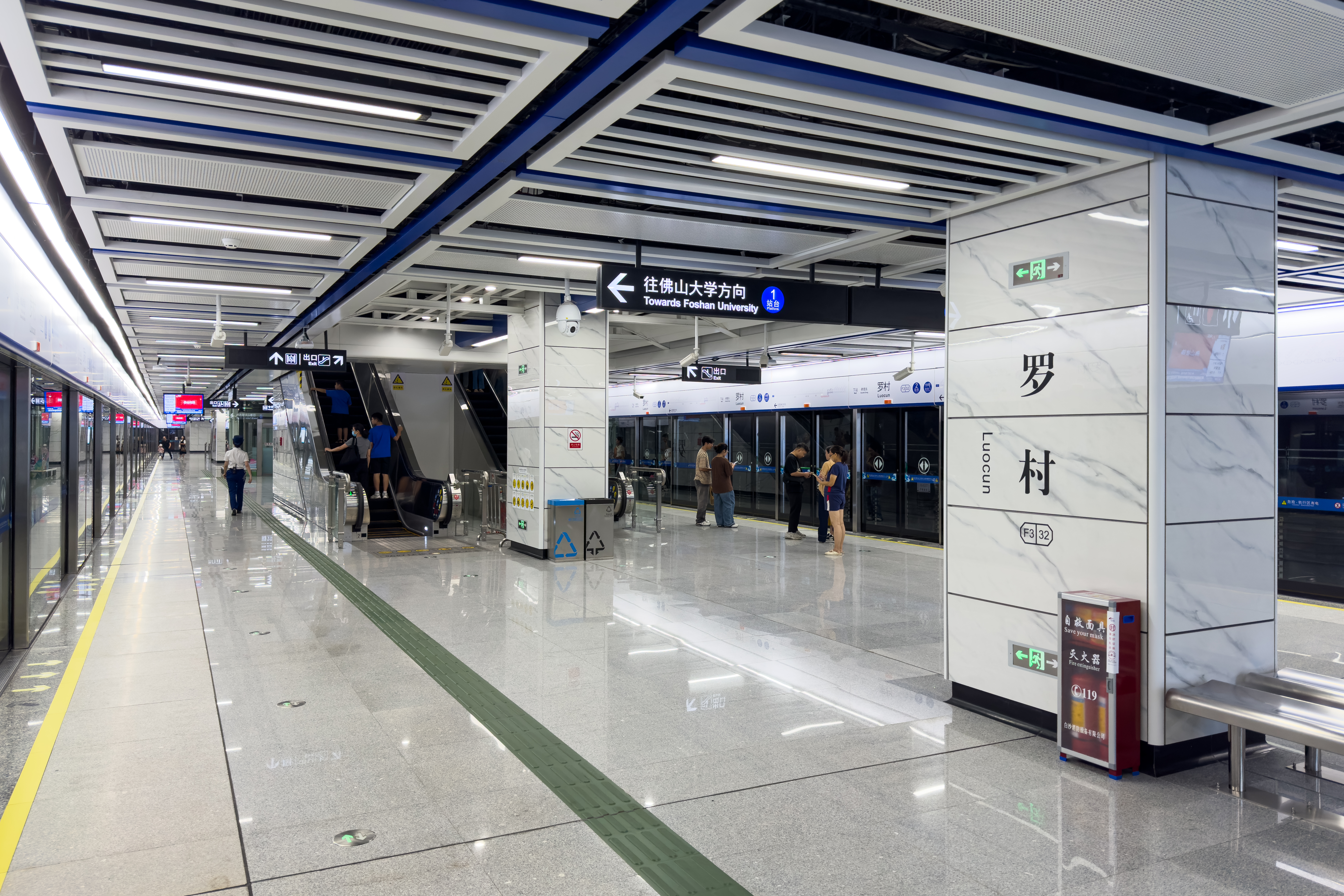
- Platform

Chinese name
- Simplified Chinese: 罗村站
- Traditional Chinese: 羅村站
Transcriptions
Standard Mandarin
- Hanyu Pinyin: Luócūn Zhàn
Yue: Cantonese
- Yale Romanization: Lòchyūn Jaahm
- Jyutping: Lo^{4}cyun^{1} Zaam^{6}

General information
- Location: Intersection of Airport Road (机场路) and Beihu 1st Road (北湖一路), Shishan; Nanhai District, Foshan, Guangdong; China
- Coordinates: 23°4′10.31″N 113°2′46.75″E
- Operator: Foshan Metro Operation Co., Ltd.
- Line: Line 3
- Platforms: 2 (1 island platform)
- Tracks: 2

Construction
- Structure type: Underground
- Accessible: Yes

Other information
- Station code: F332

History
- Opened: 23 August 2024 (23 months ago)

Services
Preceding station	Foshan Metro	Following station
Foshan West Railway Station towards Foshan University	Line 3	Xiaode Dong towards Shunde College Railway Station
Location

Luocun station (simplified Chinese: 罗村站; traditional Chinese: 羅村站; pinyin: Luócūn Zhàn; Cantonese Yale: Lòchyūn Jaahm) is a station on Line 3 of Foshan Metro, located in Foshan's Nanhai District. It opened on 23 August 2024.

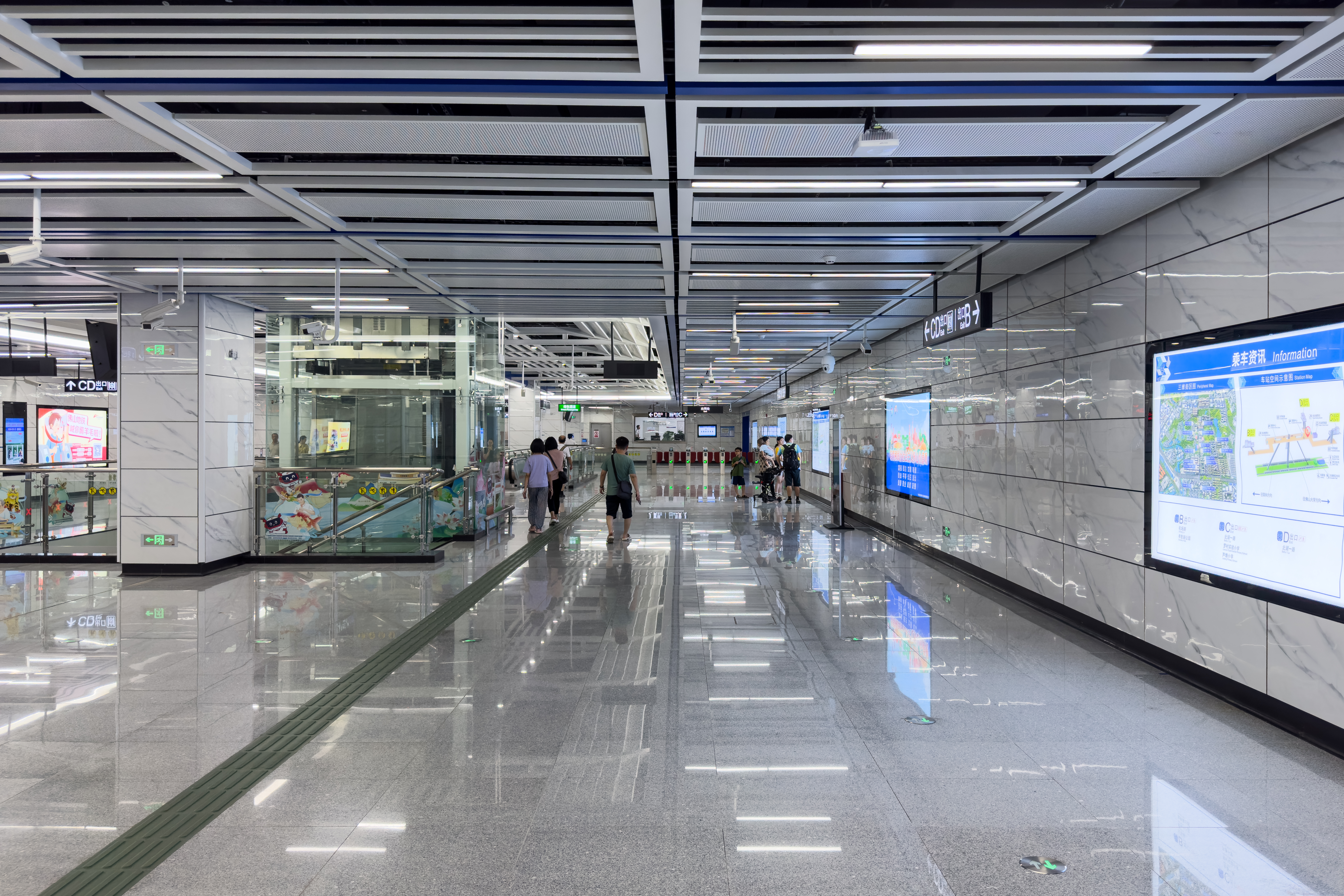
Concourse

== Station layout ==
The station has an island platform under Airport Road.

G	-	Exits B-D
L1; Concourse	Lobby	Ticket Machines, Customer Service, Shops, Police Station, Security Facilities
L2; Platforms	Platform 1	3 towards Foshan University (Foshan West Railway Station)
L2; Platforms	Island platform, doors will open on the left
L2; Platforms	Platform 2	3 towards Shunde College Railway Station (Xiaode Dong)

=== Entrances/exits ===
The station has 3 points of entry/exit, lettered B, C and D, located on the north and south sides of Airport Road. Exit C is equipped with an elevator.

- B: Airport Road
- C: Beihu 1st Road
- D: Beihu 1st Road
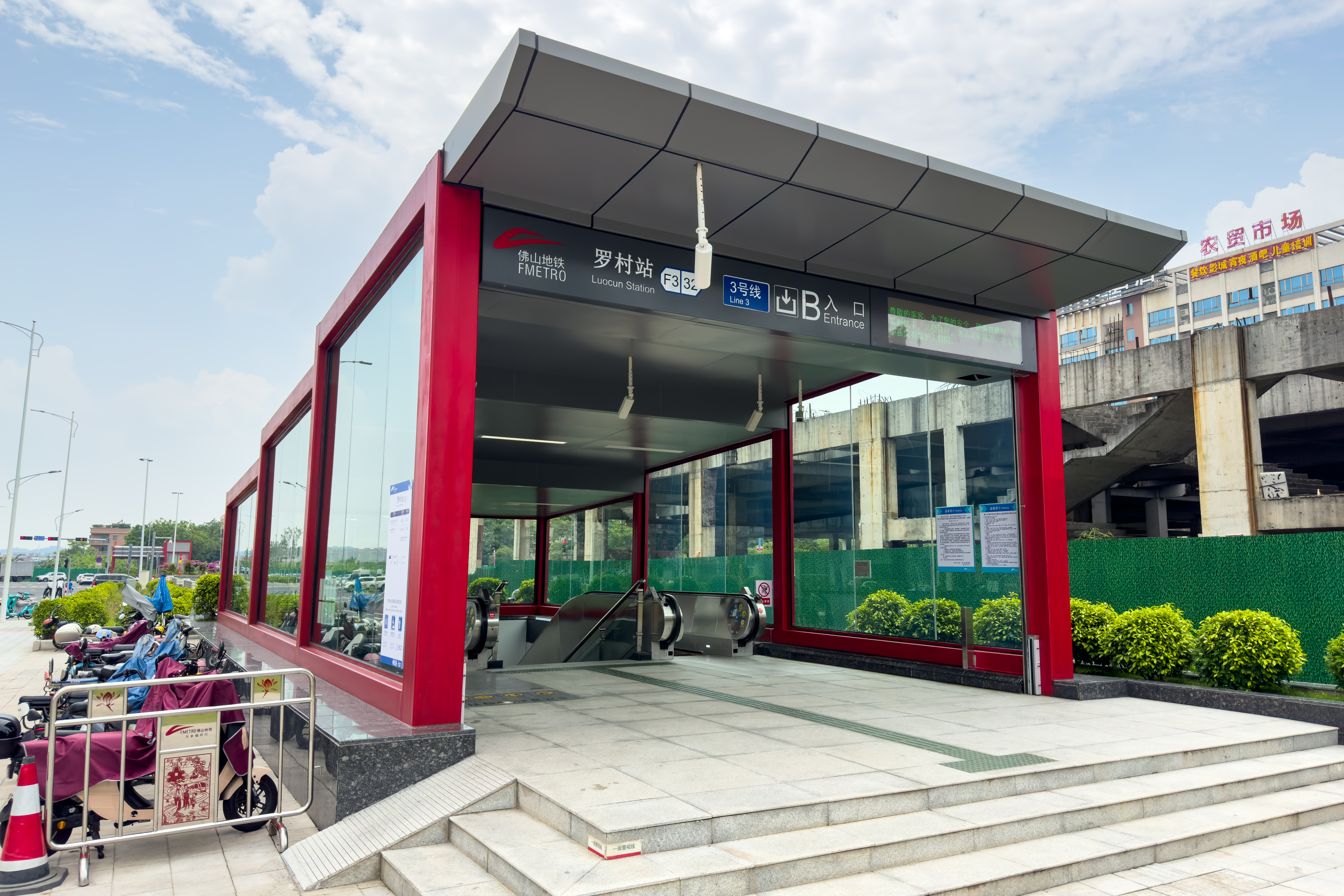
Entrance B

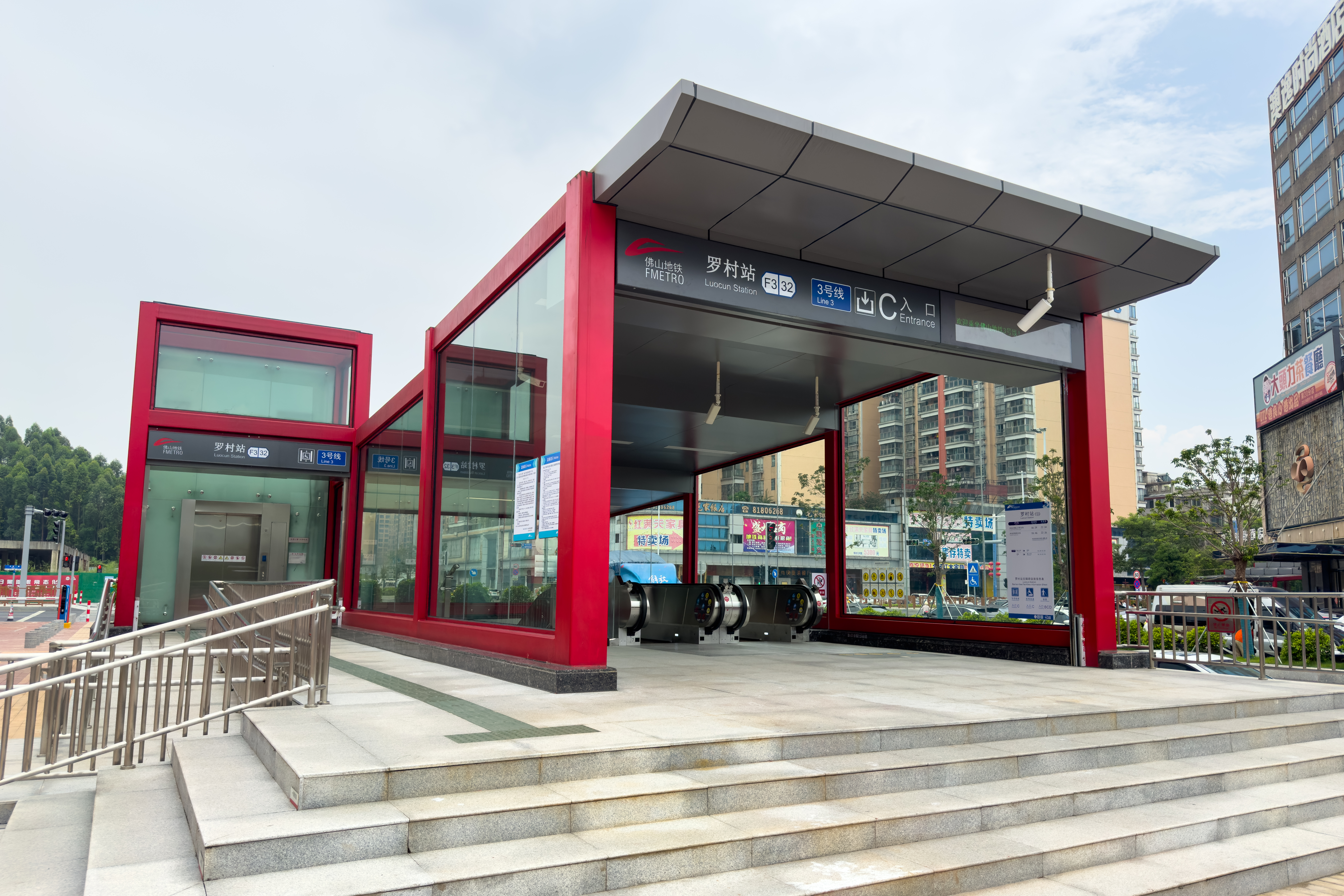
Entrance C

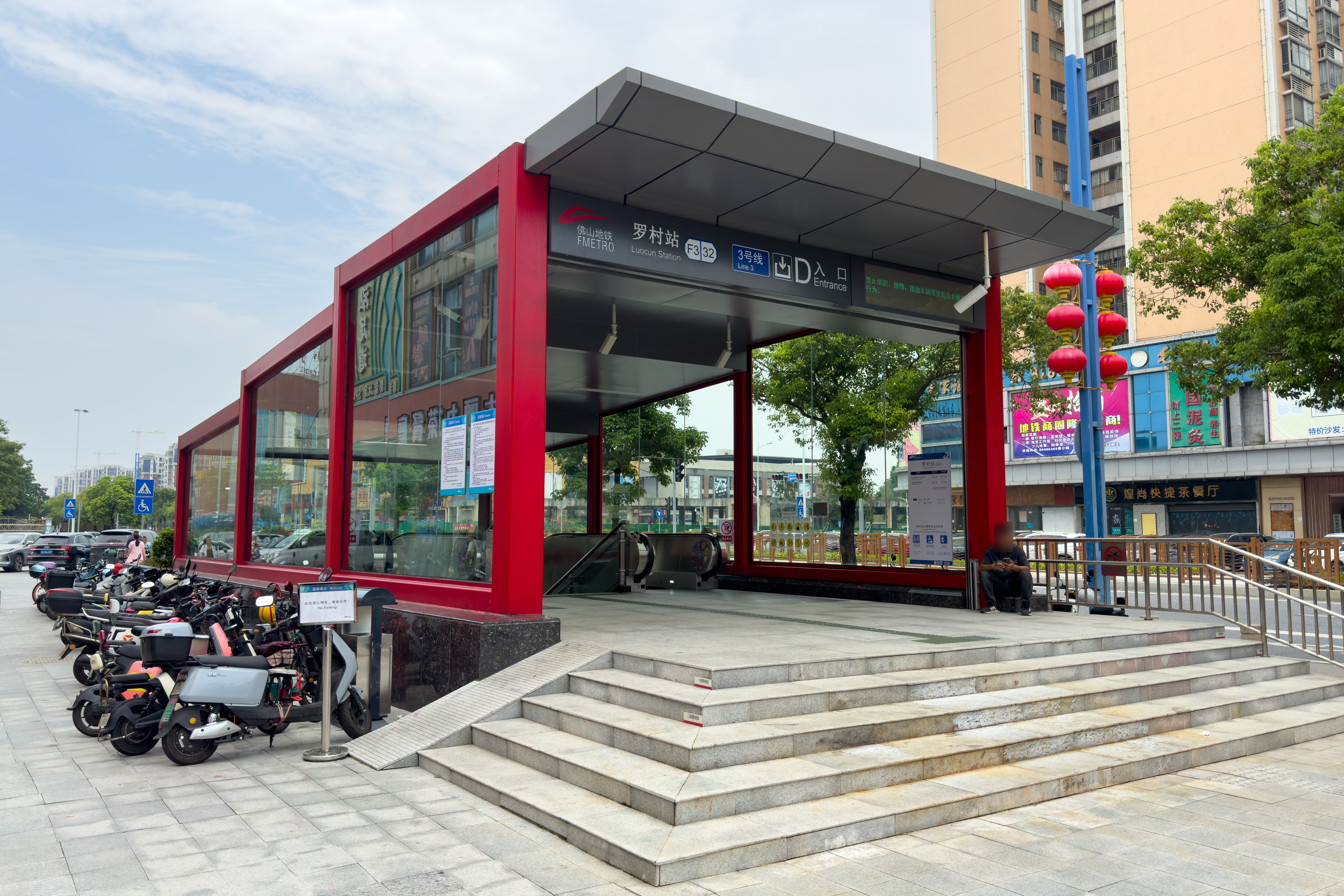
Entrance D

== History ==
The station officially started construction on 18 November 2016, and the main structure was topped out on 19 January 2019.

The station opened on 23 August 2024 as part of the section from "Lianhe to Foshan University". (Note: Prior to opening, it was known as part of the 'rear section' or 'section under construction')
