= Xiaode Dong station =

Foshan Metro Line 3 station

Xiaode Dong 孝德东
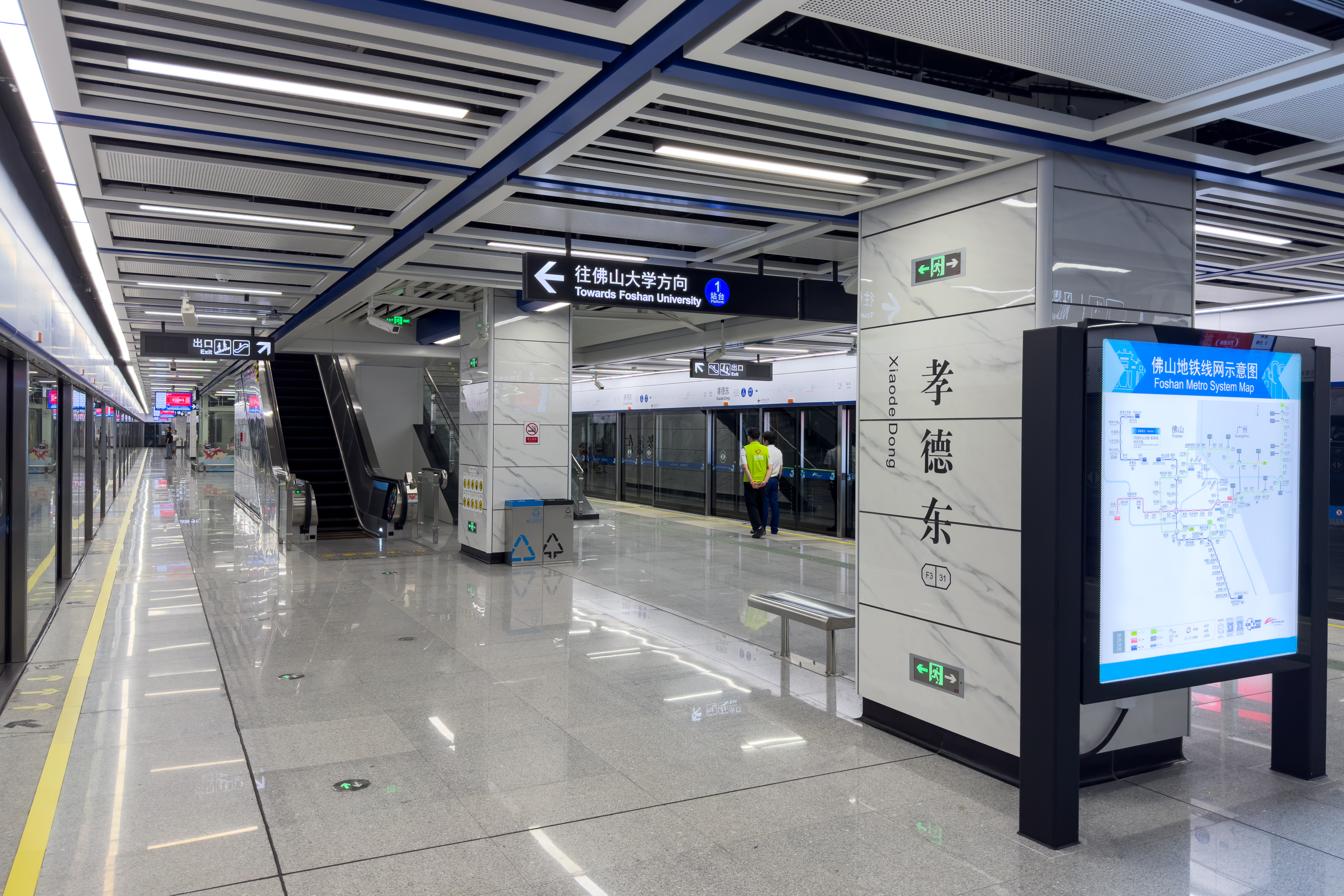
- Platform

Chinese name
- Simplified Chinese: 孝德东站
- Traditional Chinese: 孝德東站
Transcriptions
Standard Mandarin
- Hanyu Pinyin: Xiàodé Dōng Zhàn
Yue: Cantonese
- Yale Romanization: Háaudāk Dūng Jaahm
- Jyutping: Haau^{3}dak^{1} Dung^{1} Zaam^{6}

General information
- Location: Intersection of Airport Road (机场路) and Chanxi Boulevard (禅西大道), Shishan; Nanhai District, Foshan, Guangdong; China
- Coordinates: 23°4′10.99″N 113°3′50.22″E
- Operator: Foshan Metro Operation Co., Ltd.
- Line: Line 3
- Platforms: 2 (1 island platform)
- Tracks: 2
- Connections: Foshan Shadi Airport

Construction
- Structure type: Underground
- Accessible: Yes

Other information
- Station code: F331

History
- Opened: 23 August 2024 (23 months ago)
- Former names: Foshan Airport (佛山机场)

Services
Preceding station	Foshan Metro	Following station
Luocun towards Foshan University	Line 3	Lianhe towards Shunde College Railway Station
Location

Xiaode Dong station (simplified Chinese: 孝德东站; traditional Chinese: 孝德東站; pinyin: Xiàodé Dōng Zhàn; Cantonese Yale: Háaudāk Dūng Jaahm) is a station on Line 3 of Foshan Metro, located in Foshan's Nanhai District. It opened on 23 August 2024.

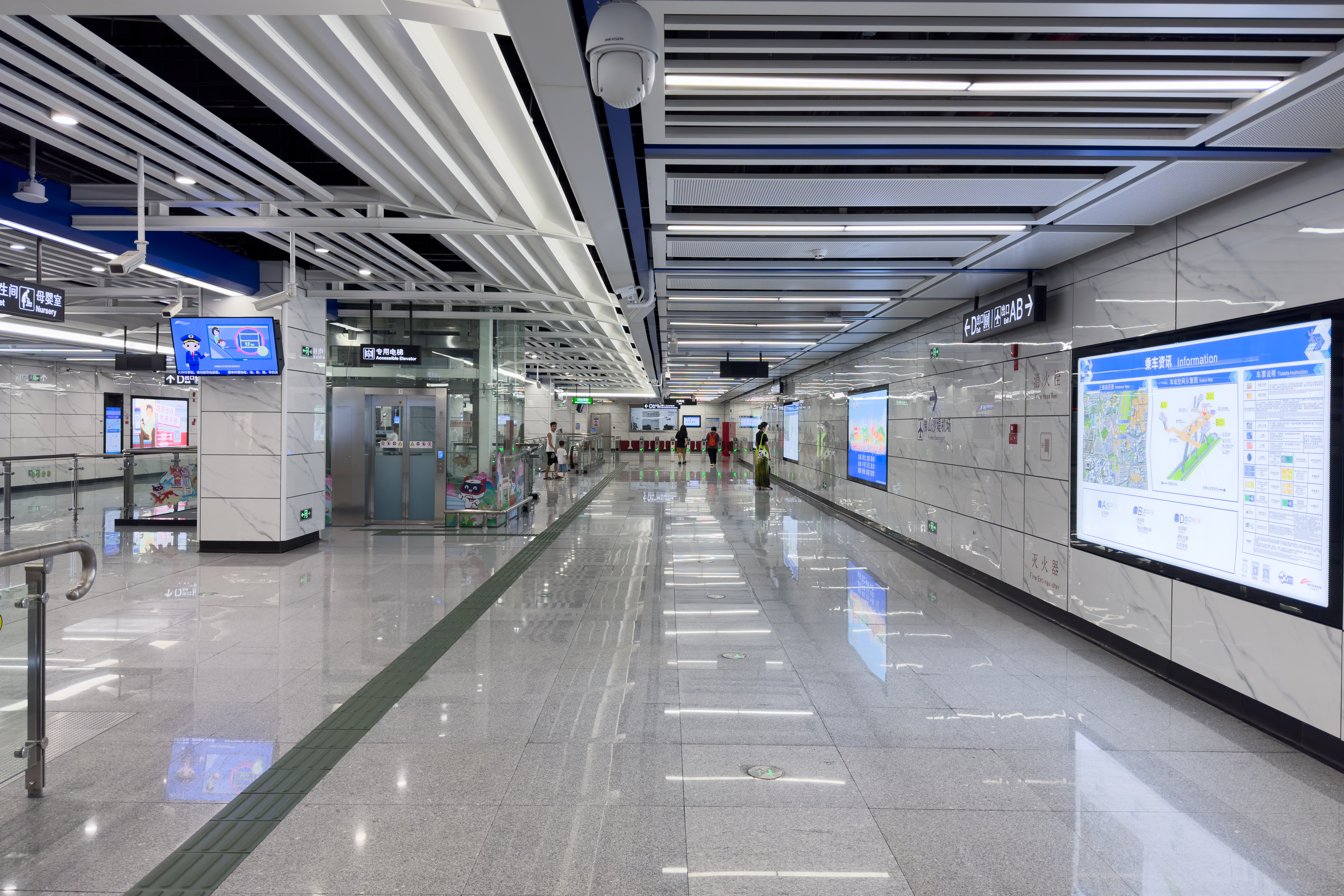
Concourse

== Station layout ==
The station has an island platform under Airport Road.

G	-	Exits A, B & D
L1; Concourse	Lobby	Ticket Machines, Customer Service, Shops, Police Station, Security Facilities
L2; Platforms	Platform 1	3 towards Foshan University (Luocun)
L2; Platforms	Island platform, doors will open on the left
L2; Platforms	Platform 2	3 towards Shunde College Railway Station (Lianhe)

=== Entrances/exits ===
The station has 3 points of entry/exit, lettered A, B and D, located on the north and south sides of Airport Road. Exit D is equipped with an elevator.

- A: Airport Road
- B: Airport Road, Foshan Shadi Airport
- D: Airport Road
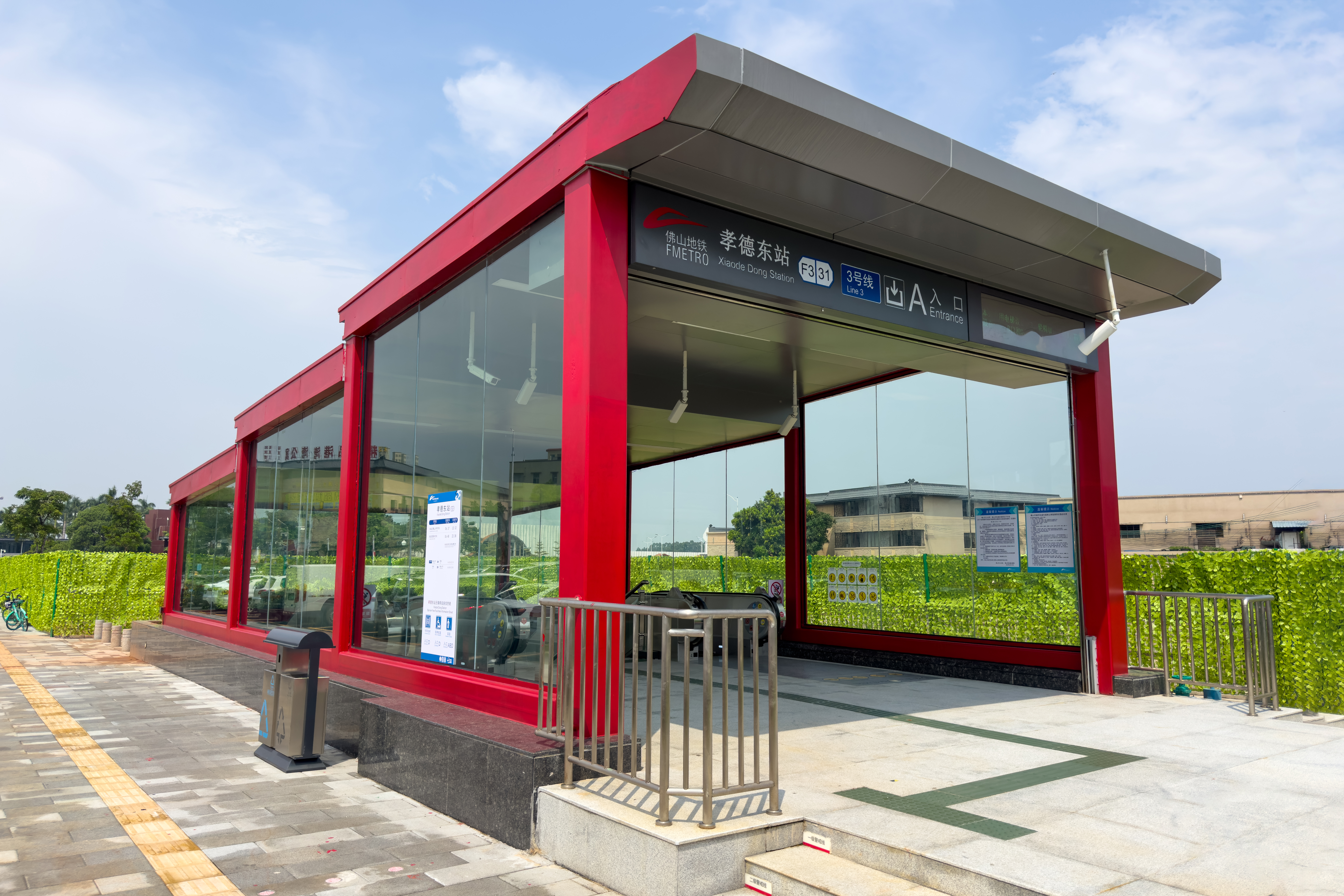
Entrance A

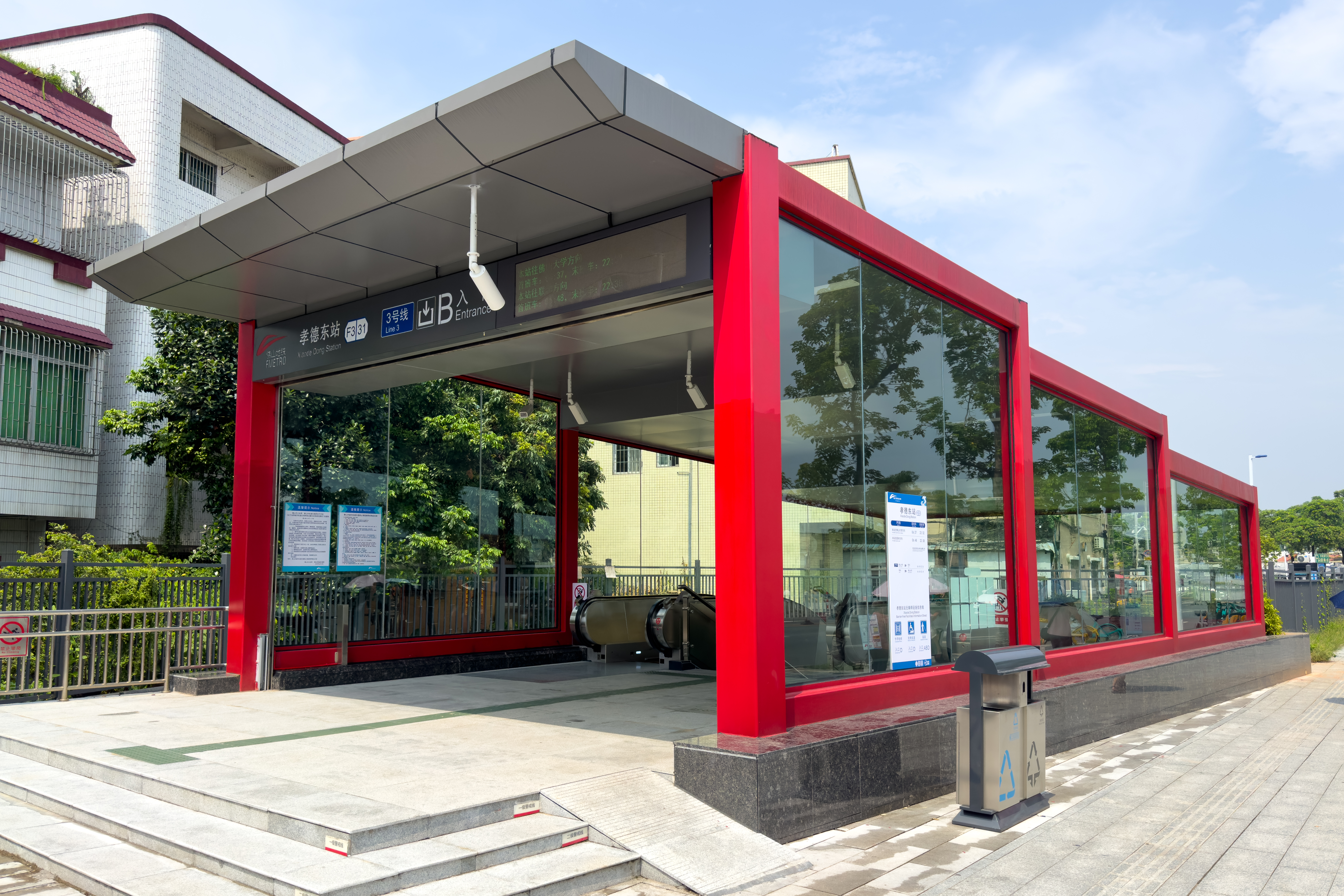
Entrance B

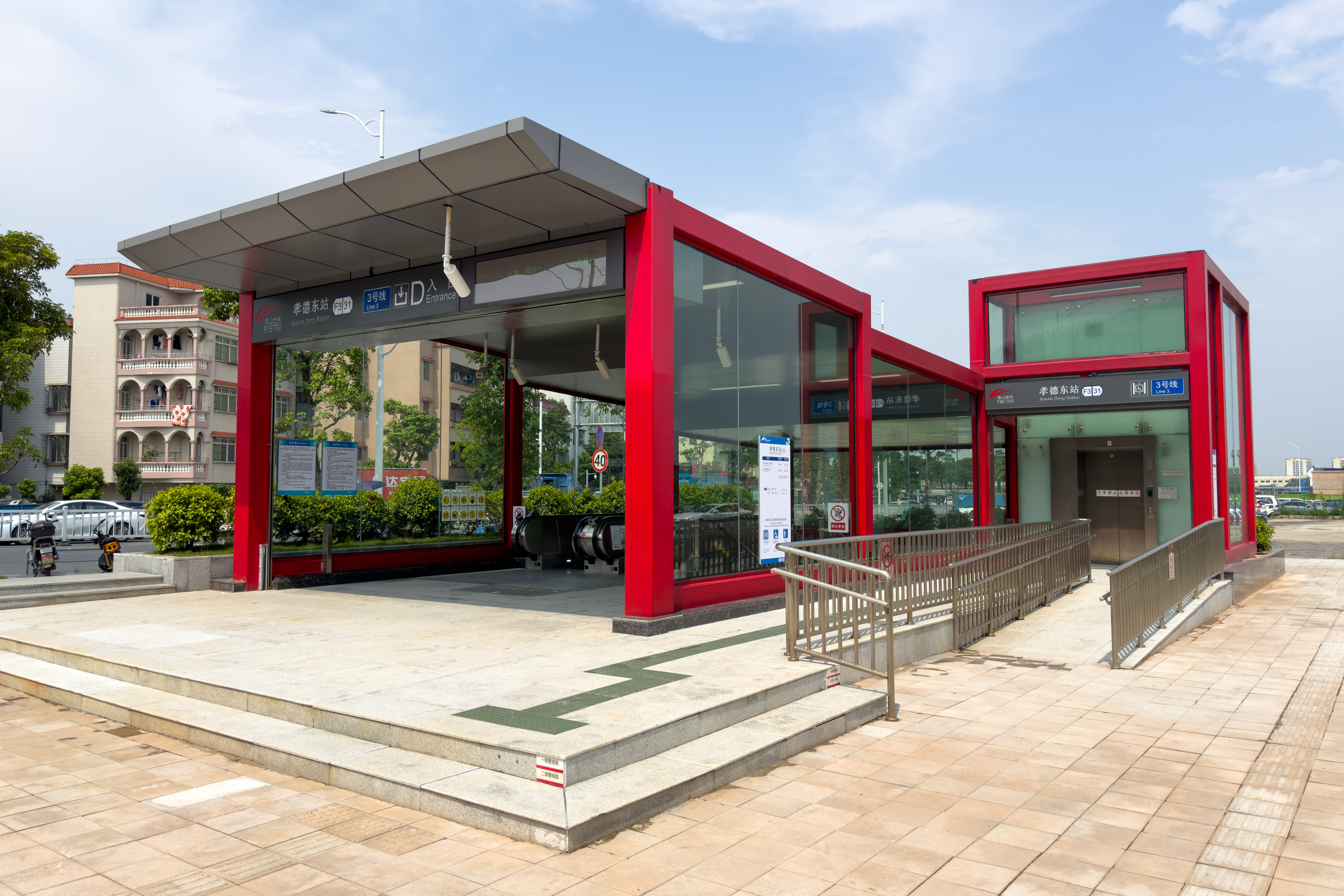
Entrance D

== History ==
During the planning and construction phase, the station was called Foshan Airport station. As the Foshan Shadi Airport near the station is planned to be relocated to Foshan Gaoming International Airport in the future and will be closed, the station was renamed to Xiaode Dong (E) station in 2022, after its location to the east of Xiaode Lake Park.

On 15 July 2019, the first phase of the station's traffic diversion and reform work was officially launched. On 27 April 2021, the main structure of the site successfully topped out.

The station opened on 23 August 2024 as part of the section from "Lianhe to Foshan University". (Note: Prior to opening, it was known as part of the 'rear section' or 'section under construction')
