= Foshan Railway Station (Foshan Metro) =

Foshan Metro Line 3 station

Foshan Railway Station 佛山站
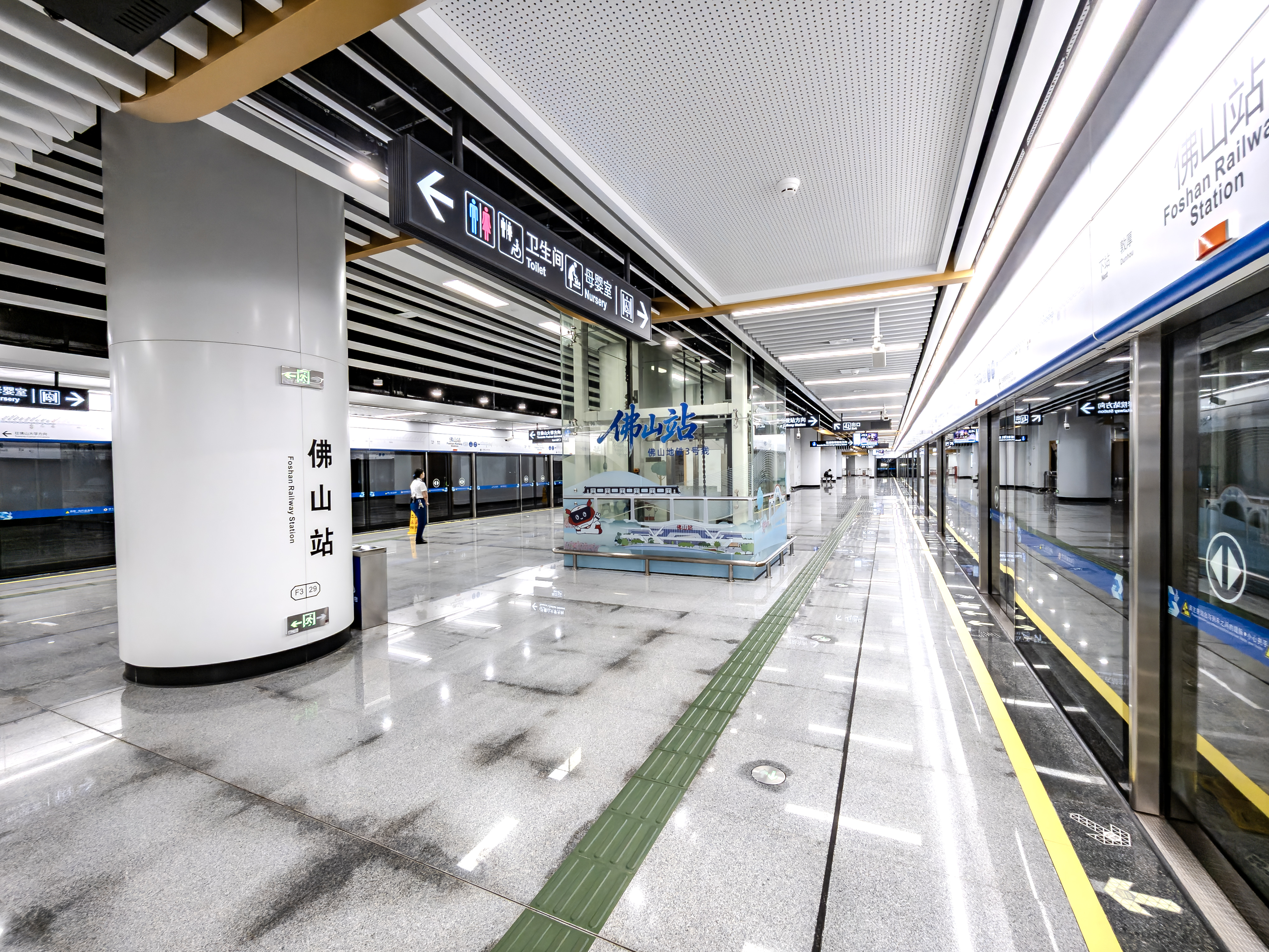
- Platform

Chinese name
- Chinese: 佛山站
Transcriptions
Standard Mandarin
- Hanyu Pinyin: Fóshān Zhàn
Yue: Cantonese
- Yale Romanization: Fahtsāan Jaahm
- Jyutping: Fat^{6}saan^{1} Zaam^{6}

General information
- Location: Underneath Guangzhou–Zhanjiang high-speed railway Foshan railway station station building, Zumiao Subdistrict; Chancheng District, Foshan, Guangdong; China
- Coordinates: 23°3′12.17″N 113°5′25.33″E
- Operator: Foshan Metro Operation Co., Ltd.
- Line: Line 3
- Platforms: 2 (1 island platform)
- Tracks: 2
- Connections: Foshan

Construction
- Structure type: Underground
- Accessible: Yes

Other information
- Station code: F329

History
- Opening: 1 July 2026 (44 days ago)

Services
Preceding station	Foshan Metro	Following station
Lianhe towards Foshan University	Line 3	Dunhou towards Shunde College Railway Station
Location

Foshan Railway Station (Chinese: 佛山站; pinyin: Fóshān Zhàn; Cantonese Yale: Fahtsāan Jaahm) is a station on Line 3 of Foshan Metro, located in Foshan's Chancheng District underneath Foshan railway station.

This station was approved to be added along the line in 2022, and construction began in July 2024. It was opened simultaneously with the opening of the new Foshan station on 1 July 2026.

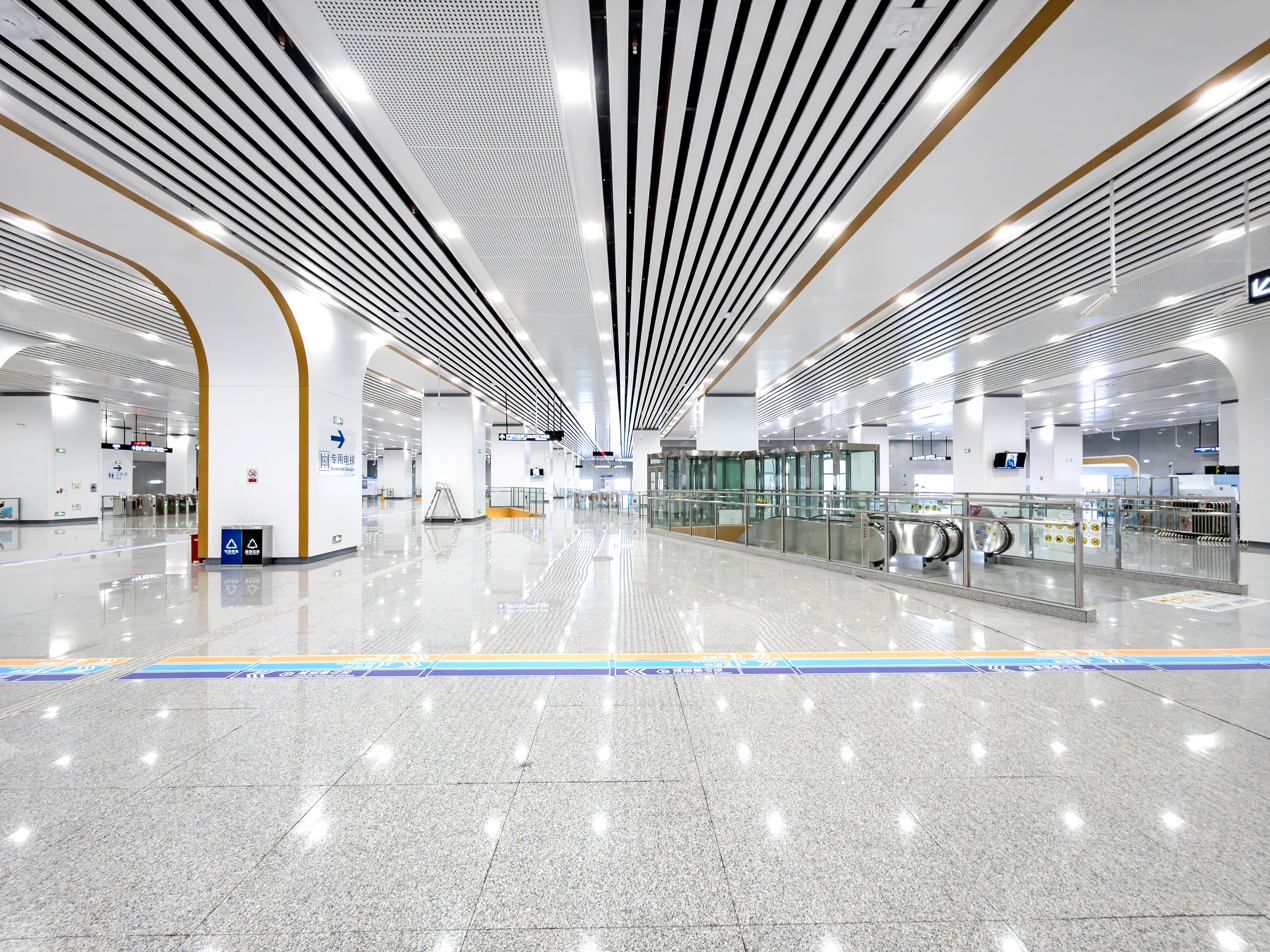
Concourse

== Station layout ==
The station has an island platform.

G	-	Exits, Foshan railway station
L1; Concourse	Lobby	Ticket Machines, Customer Service, Shops, Police Station, Security Facilities
L2	-	Station Equipment; Reserved areas for Line 7, Line 15
L3; Platforms	Platform 1	3 towards Foshan University (Lianhe)
L3; Platforms	Island platform, doors will open on the left
L3; Platforms	Platform 2	3 towards Shunde College Railway Station (Dunhou)

Because the station concourse shares a transfer space with the national railway station, there are no separate entrances/exits within the paid area of the metro station. Citizens must enter and exit through the entrances/exits shared with the national railway station building and through municipal supporting passageways.

=== Entrances/exits ===
There are 6 points of entry/exit, lettered A-F. Exits B and C are located in the waiting hall of the national railway station, while Exit F is located close to the bus station. All exits are equipped with elevators.

- A: Dongpo Road, Foshan railway station North Square
- B: Dongpo Road, Foshan railway station North Entrance, P1, P2 Parking Lots
- C: Foshan Avenue, Foshan railway station North Entrance, P3, P4 Parking Lots
- D: Foshan Avenue, Foshan railway station North Square

== History ==
Line 3 was approved in 2012, and in 2019, when the line was adjusted, this station was not included. In 2022, Foshan authorities planned to introduce Line 3 at the new Foshan high-speed rail station of the Guangzhou–Zhanjiang high-speed railway, which was confirmed by the Foshan Rail Transit Bureau in June of the same year. Eventually, the station was named Foshan Railway Station (with the extra words 'high-speed' (高铁) added in Chinese, which were later removed in early 2026), and the relevant design scheme of the station was officially approved on 15 August 2022, and it is planned to be opened simultaneously with the Foshan Railway Station of the Guangzhou–Zhanjiang High-speed Railway.

On 28 July 2024, the construction of this station will start together with the new Foshan Station. Since this station was only added after the construction of Line 3 started for a period of time, the tunnel segments that have been built between Lianhe and Dunhou of Line 3 will be removed during the construction of the station, which means that Line 3 is also unable to pass through this station and needs to be operated in sections. In November 2025, the station was handed over to the metro company for electromechanical installation and track laying.

In May 2026, the station completed its electromechanical installation and entered operational commissioning.

On 14 June 2026, the station passed the pre-operation safety assessment. On 1 July 2026, the station opened in tandem with the new Foshan station.

== Future development ==
The planned Line 7 and Line 15 will pass through the station. Construction of the Foshan Station of the Guangzhou–Zhanjiang High-speed Railway included a reservation for civil works on the second basement floor of the station, and the main structure will intersect with the Line 3 station at 68°.
