= Foshan railway station =

Railway station in Foshan, China

Coordinates: 23°03′00.11″N 113°05′54.67″E

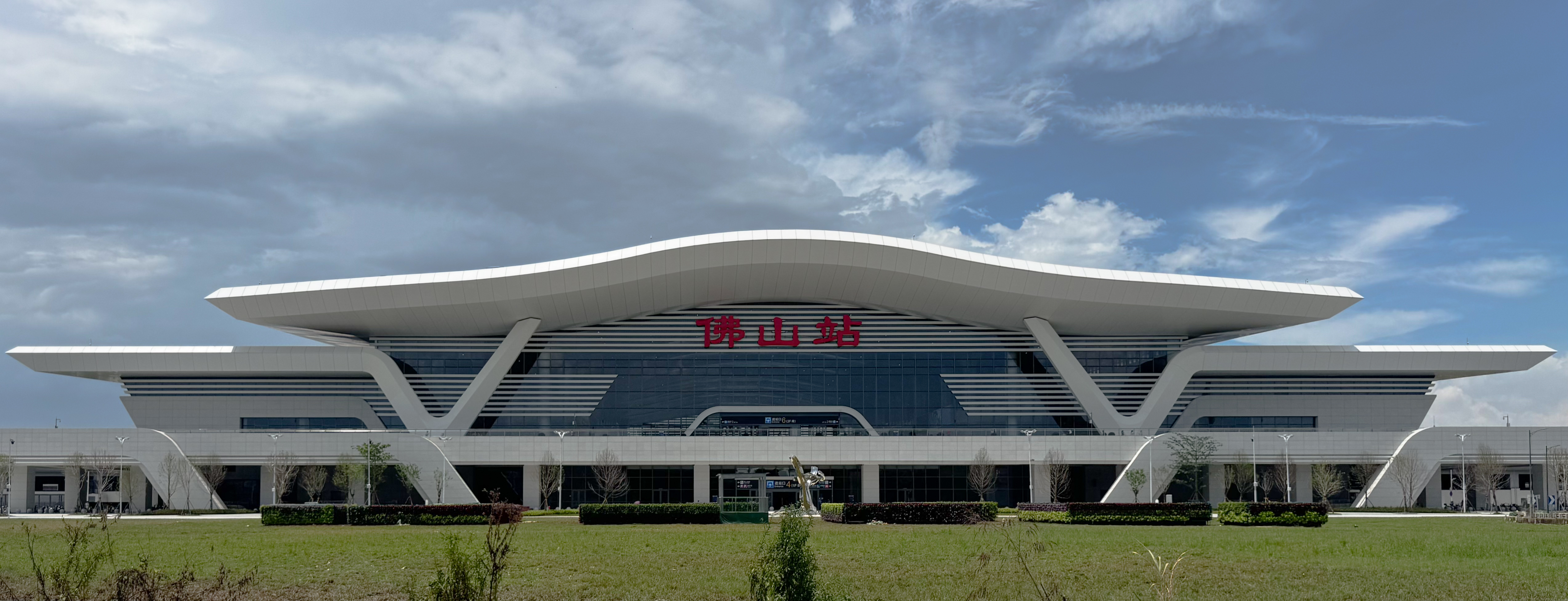
Foshan railway station

Foshan railway station (Chinese: 佛山站; pinyin: Fóshān zhàn) is located in Chancheng District, Foshan, Guangdong Province, China. Train services include those departing to Guangzhou, Kunming, Xiamen (Note: Example includes K230/231, K232/229 trains (click here for reference in Chinese language).), Nanning and Hainan.

The railway station was closed on 11 October 2023. It will be rebuilt as a high-speed rail station together with the construction of Guangzhou–Zhanjiang high-speed railway.

On 1 July 2026, the new Foshan Railway station officially began operation, and also in tandem with the new Foshan Metro Line 3 station..

== See also ==
- Foshan West railway station
