= Xiangyunsha silk =

Type of Chinese silk

Xiangyunsha silk (traditional Chinese: 香雲紗; simplified Chinese: 香云纱; pinyin: Xiāng-yún-shā) or Gambiered Guangdong silk is a type of silk originating in the 5th century from Guangdong province (also known as Canton) in China that is created by dyeing silk with gambier juice and covering it in soil from the Pearl River, resulting in a copper color on one side and a black color on the other.

== History ==
The name "Xiangyunsha" silk has at least nine sets of characters to name and mean the silk, with seven meanings referring to the materials and/or process to make the silk, and two meanings that refer to the sensory experience of wearing the silk: "singing silk cloth" and "fragrant cloud silk cloth". Specifically from Shunde district, Xiangyunsha silk has historically been expensive since as early as the Yongle period of the Ming Dynasty, and has been shipped to Southeast Asia, Taiwan, and as far as Honolulu, where some examples of xiangyunsha silk have been kept at the Honolulu Academy of Arts in their Xiangyunsha silk collection. It was listed in the second batch of the 2008 National List of Intangible Cultural Heritage of China by the Ministry of Culture, and has its roots in Lingnan culture. The fabric has appeared in books and old movies, and it is today being incorporated into modern luxury textiles. It is considered to be comfortable, durable, and resistant to sunlight and moisture, making it good to wear in the summer. Xiangyunsha silk has recently appeared in mainstream fashion shows, including China Fashion Week, Paris Fashion Week, and Guangdong Fashion Week.

== Production ==
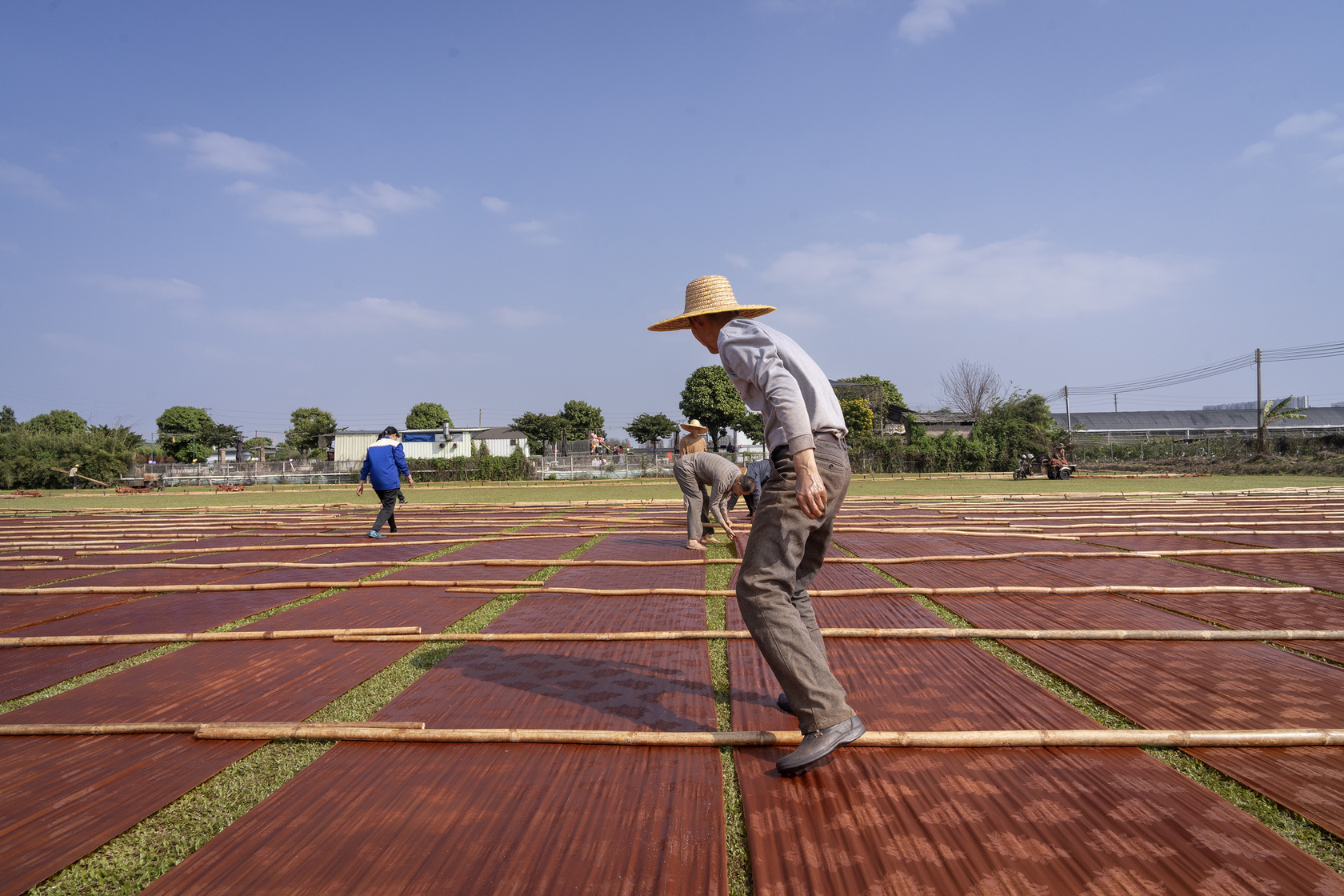
Photo of workers drying strips of xiangyunsha silk

Xiangyunsha silk is created with the use of the leno weave, which can be used to create visual motifs in the fabric. After dyeing the fabric in gambier juice, it is covered with mud and soil from the river, dried in the shade, and then rinsed of the mud to then be dried again in the grass in 18.5 and 20 meter long strips of fabric. There are as many as fourteen procedures done over fifteen or sixteen days, and production is also limited by weather. The sun is too strong and the temperature is too hot from July to August, and monsoon movement after November are notable time frames where silk production is stopped, and production is then limited to happening between March and November. The silk's properties are influenced by the use of iron, lignin, and tannin-rich mud in the production. The production is considered environmentally friendly, as it doesn't generate wastewater or produce waste.
