= Lianhe station =

Foshan Metro station

Lianhe 联和
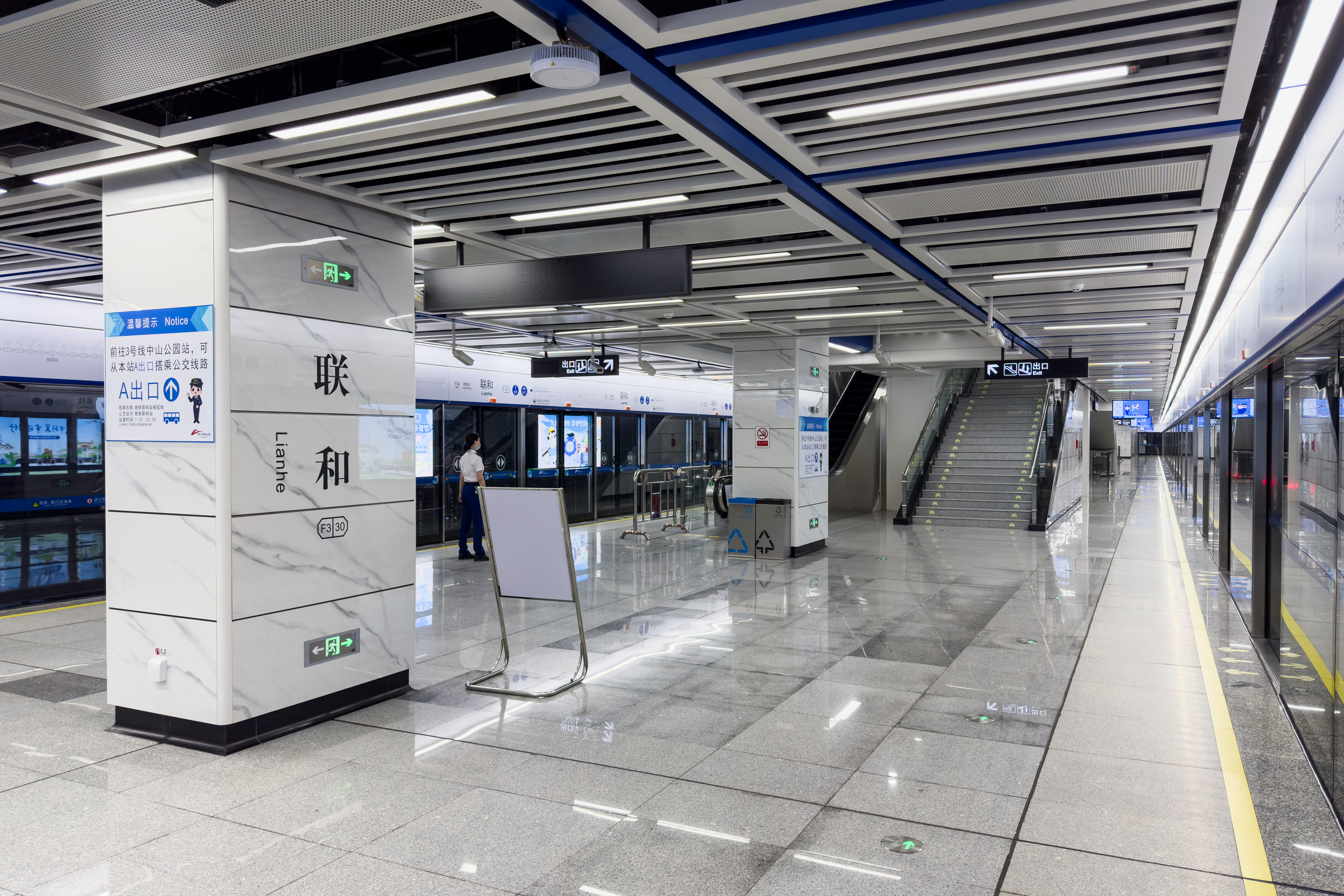
- Platform

Chinese name
- Simplified Chinese: 联和站
- Traditional Chinese: 聯和站
Transcriptions
Standard Mandarin
- Hanyu Pinyin: Liánhé Zhàn
Yue: Cantonese
- Yale Romanization: Lùnwò Jaahm
- Jyutping: Lyun^{4}wo^{4} Zaam^{6}

General information
- Location: Intersection of Guidan Road (桂丹路) and Lianhe Boulevard (联和大道), Shishan; Nanhai District, Foshan, Guangdong; China
- Coordinates: 23°3′47.81″N 113°4′46.27″E
- Operator: Foshan Metro Operation Co., Ltd.
- Line: Line 3
- Platforms: 2 (1 island platform)
- Tracks: 2

Construction
- Structure type: Underground
- Accessible: Yes

Other information
- Station code: F330

History
- Opened: 23 August 2024 (23 months ago)
- Former names: Guidan Road (桂丹路)

Services
| Preceding station | Foshan Metro | Following station |
|---|---|---|
| Xiaode Dong towards Foshan University | Line 3 | Foshan Railway Station towards Shunde College Railway Station |
Location

Lianhe station (simplified Chinese: 联和站; traditional Chinese: 聯和站; pinyin: Liánhé Zhàn; Cantonese Yale: Lùnwò Jaahm) is a station on Line 3 of Foshan Metro, located in Foshan's Nanhai District. It opened on 23 August 2024. It is the second-largest station on the line.

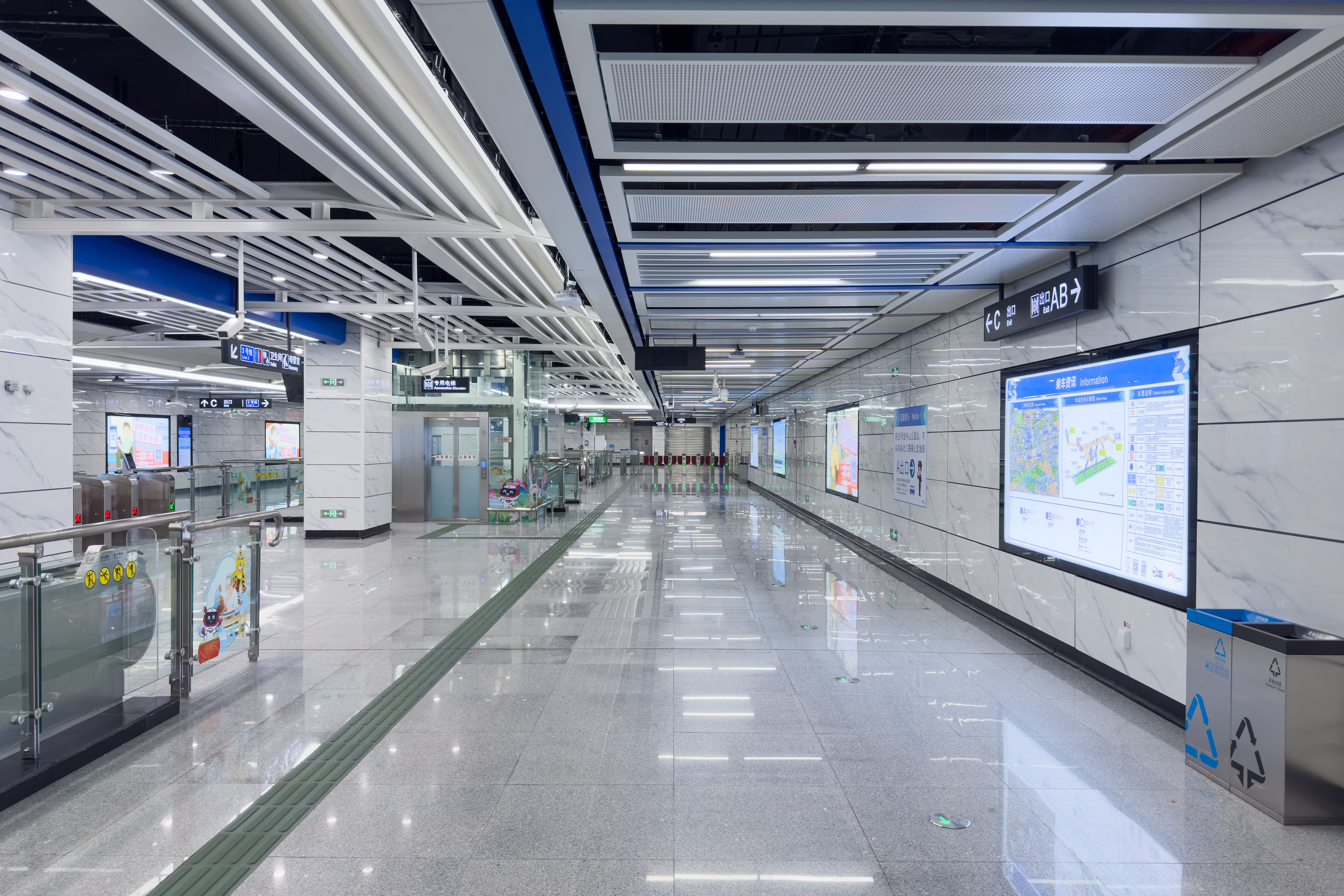
Concourse

== Station layout ==
The station has an island platform under Lianhe Boulevard. There is a group of double storage lines at the south end of the station, and because the operation of Line 3 was once divided into two sections, the trains from Foshan University station would turnback through the storage lines, and this station would be the southern terminus of the northern section.

| G | - | Exits A-D |
| L1; Concourse | Lobby | Ticket Machines, Customer Service, Shops, Police Station, Security Facilities |
| L2; Platforms | Platform 1 | 3 towards Foshan University (Xiaode Dong) |
| L2; Platforms | Island platform, doors will open on the left |
| L2; Platforms | Platform 2 | 3 towards Shunde College Railway Station (Foshan Railway Station) |

=== Entrances/exits ===
The station will have a total of 4 points of entry/exit, lettered A-D, located on the east and west sides of Lianhe Boulevard. In its initial opening, the station opened Exits A-C. On 18 June 2026, Exit D was opened. Exit B is equipped with an elevator.

- A: Guidan Road
- B: Guidan Road
- C: Guidan Road
- D: Guidan Road
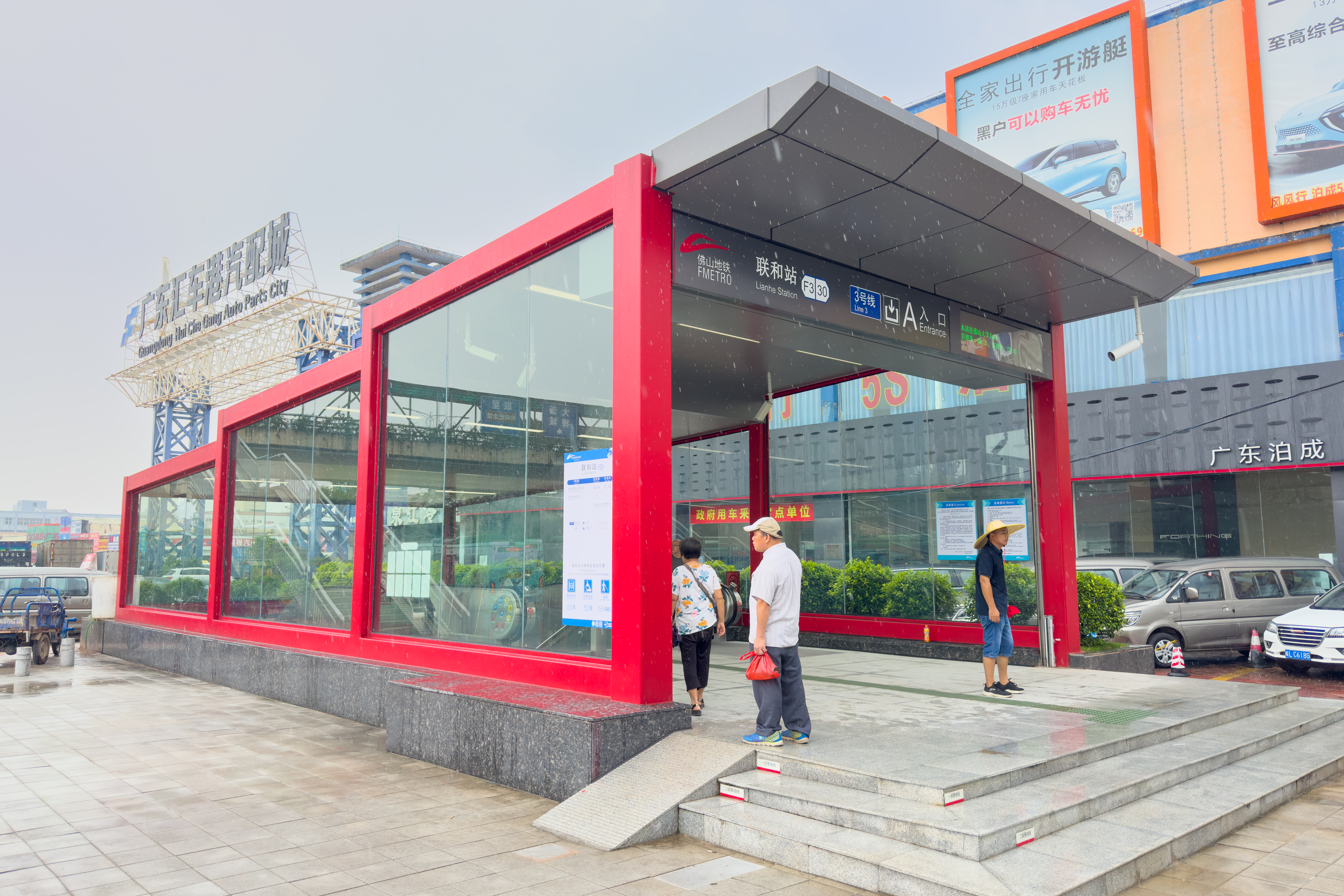
Entrance A

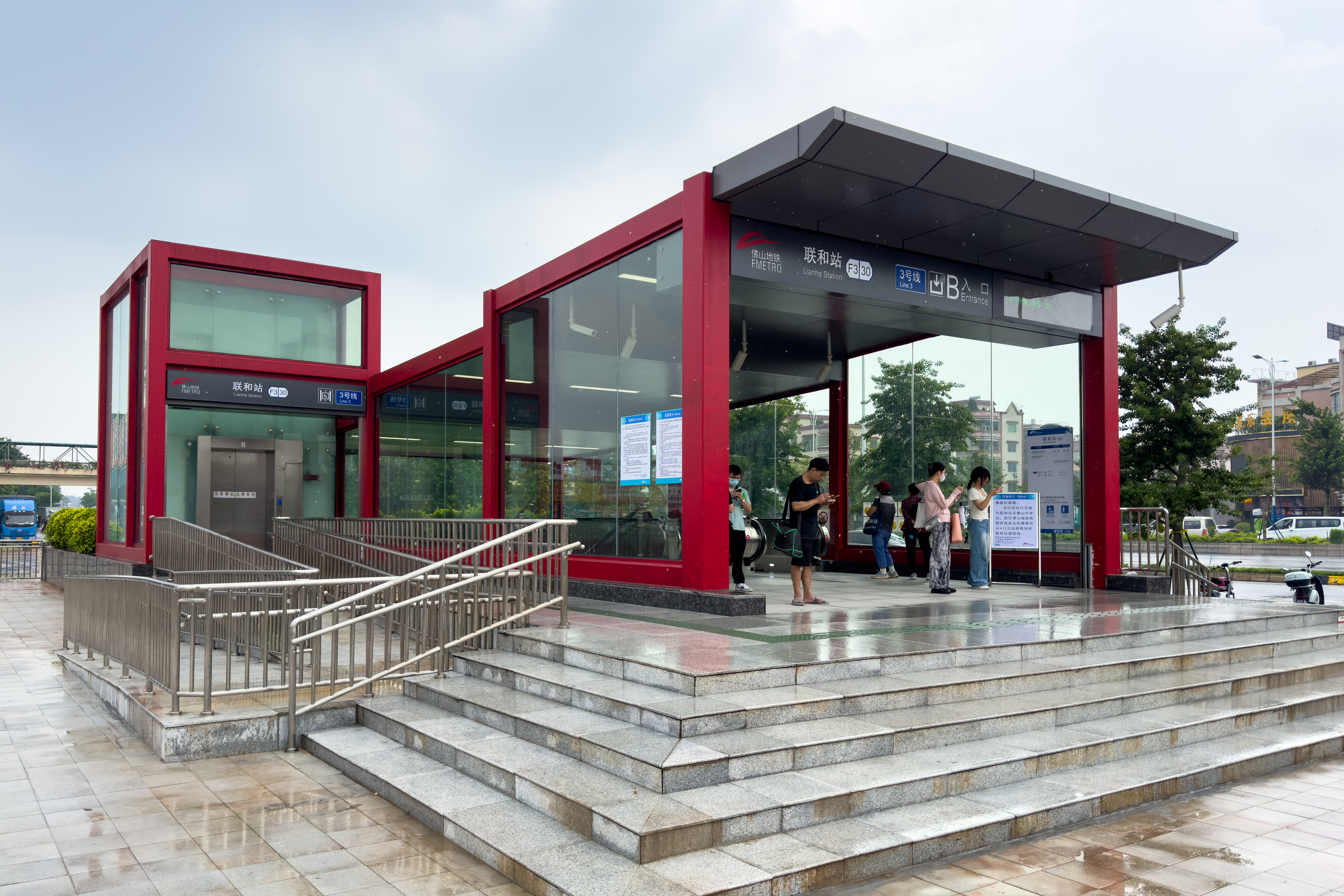
Entrance B

== History ==
The station was called Guidan Road station during the planning and construction phase, and in 2022 it was renamed to Lianhe station. The station began to enclose the construction of Guidan Road on 9 August 2017, excavated the foundation pit on 25 November 2018, and the main structure was topped out on 23 June 2020.

The station opened on 23 August 2024 as part of the section from "Lianhe to Foshan University". (Note: Prior to opening, it was known as part of the 'rear section' or 'section under construction')
