= The First People's Hospital of Shunde station =

Foshan Metro Line 3 station

The First People's Hospital of Shunde 顺德人民医院
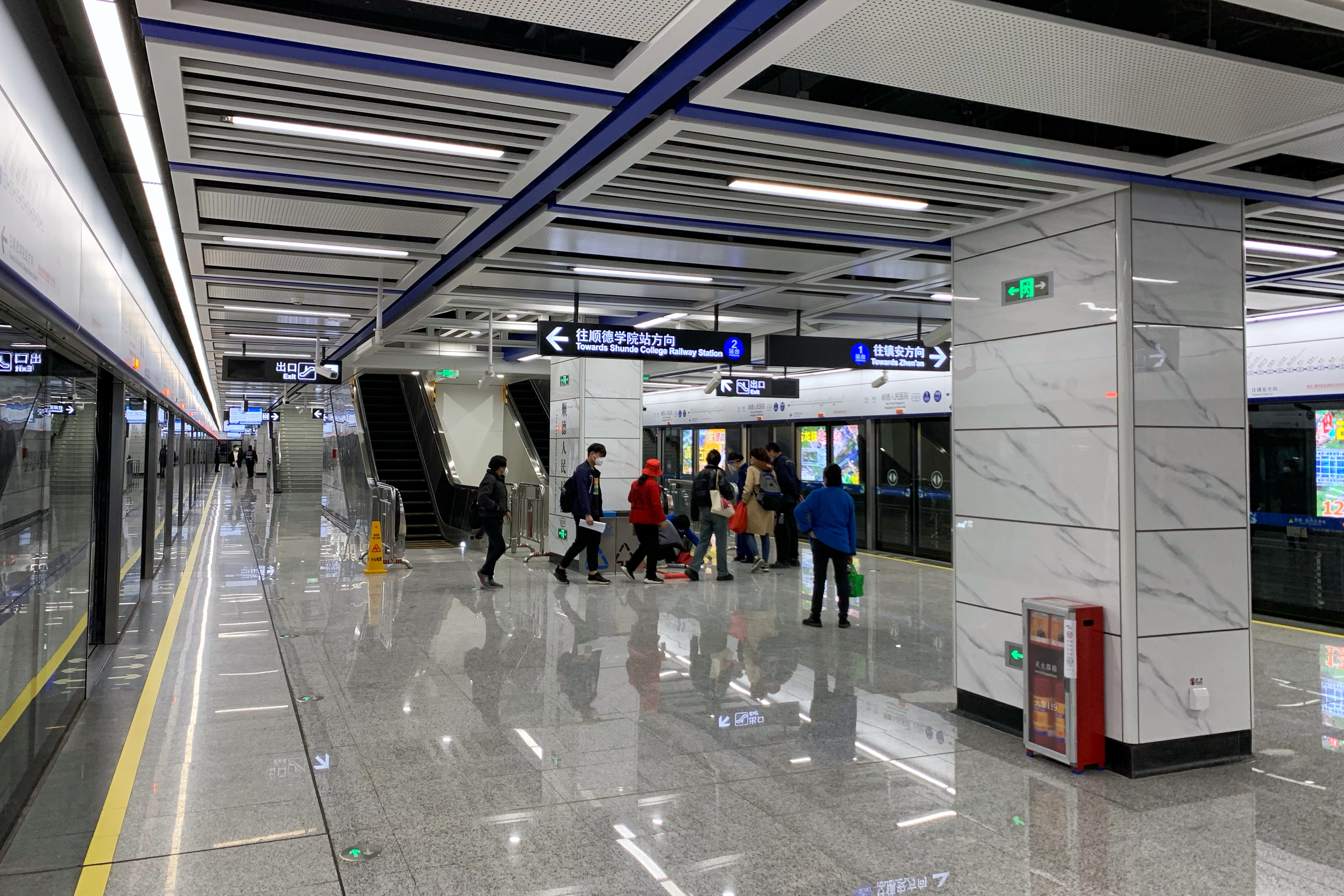
- Platform

Chinese name
- Simplified Chinese: 顺德人民医院站
- Traditional Chinese: 順德人民醫院站
Transcriptions
Standard Mandarin
- Hanyu Pinyin: Shùndé Rénmín Yīyuàn Zhàn
Yue: Cantonese
- Yale Romanization: Seuhndāk Yàhnmàhn Yīyún Jaahm
- Jyutping: Seon^{6}dak^{1} Jan^{4}man^{4} Ji^{1}jyun^{2} Zaam^{6}

General information
- Location: Intersection of Longzhou Highway (龙洲公路) and Jiazi Road (甲子路), Lunjiao Subdistrict; Shunde District, Foshan, Guangdong; China
- Coordinates: 22°52′14.84″N 113°14′12.84″E
- Operator: Foshan Metro Operation Co., Ltd.
- Line: Line 3
- Platforms: 2 (1 island platform)
- Tracks: 2

Construction
- Structure type: Underground
- Accessible: Yes

Other information
- Station code: F309

History
- Opened: 28 December 2022 (3 years ago)

Services
| Preceding station | Foshan Metro | Following station |
|---|---|---|
| Licun towards Foshan University | Line 3 | Huanshi Bei towards Shunde College Railway Station |
Location

The First People's Hospital of Shunde station (simplified Chinese: 顺德人民医院站; traditional Chinese: 順德人民醫院站; pinyin: Shùndé Rénmín Yīyuàn Zhàn; Cantonese Yale: Seuhndāk Yàhnmàhn Yīyún Jaahm) is a station on Line 3 of Foshan Metro, located in Foshan's Shunde District. It opened on 28 December 2022.

== Station layout ==
The station has an island platform under Jiazi Road.

| G | - | Exits B, C, D |
| L1; Concourse | Lobby | Ticket Machines, Customer Service, Shops, Police Station, Security Facilities |
| L2; Platforms | Platform 1 | 3 towards Foshan University (Licun) |
| L2; Platforms | Island platform, doors will open on the left |
| L2; Platforms | Platform 2 | 3 towards Shunde College Railway Station (Huanshi Bei) |

=== Entrances/exits ===
The station has 3 points of entry/exit, located on the east and west sides of Jiazi Road. All exits are equipped with elevators.

- B: Jiazi Road, The Eighth Affiliated Hospital of Southern Medical University
- C: Jiazi Road, The Eighth Affiliated Hospital of Southern Medical University
- D: Jiazi Road

== History ==
The station was called Shunde Hospital station during the planning and construction phase. The station started construction on 18 November 2016 and topped out on 17 May 2019. On 30 May 2022, the station completed the "three rights" transfer. On 28 December the same year, the station opened with the opening of Line 3.
