= Licun station (Foshan Metro) =

Foshan Metro Line 3 station

Licun 荔村
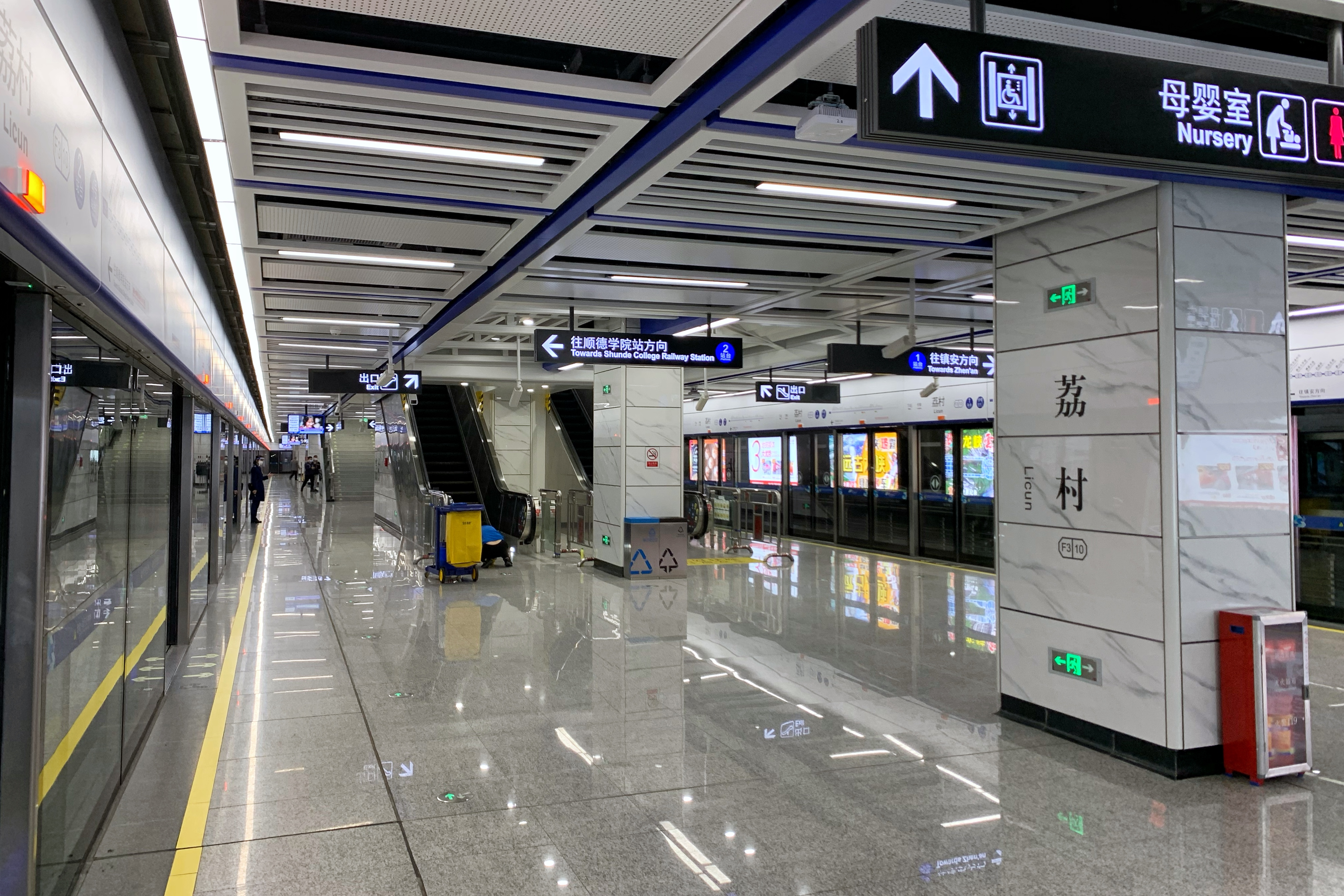
- Platform

Chinese name
- Chinese: 荔村站
Transcriptions
Standard Mandarin
- Hanyu Pinyin: Lìcūn Zhàn
Yue: Cantonese
- Yale Romanization: Laihchyūn Jaahm
- Jyutping: Lai^{6}cyun^{1} Zaam^{6}

General information
- Location: Intersection of Yangda Road (羊大路) and Yucheng Road (裕成路), Lunjiao Subdistrict; Shunde District, Foshan, Guangdong; China
- Coordinates: 22°52′29.75″N 113°13′32.16″E
- Operator: Foshan Metro Operation Co., Ltd.
- Line: Line 3
- Platforms: 2 (1 island platform)
- Tracks: 2

Construction
- Structure type: Underground
- Accessible: Yes

Other information
- Station code: F310

History
- Opened: 28 December 2022 (3 years ago)

Services
Preceding station	Foshan Metro	Following station
Lunjiao towards Foshan University	Line 3	The First People's Hospital of Shunde towards Shunde College Railway Station
Location

Licun station (Chinese: 荔村站; pinyin: Lìcūn Zhàn; Cantonese Yale: Laihchyūn Jaahm) is a station on Line 3 of Foshan Metro, located in Foshan's Shunde District. It opened on 28 December 2022.

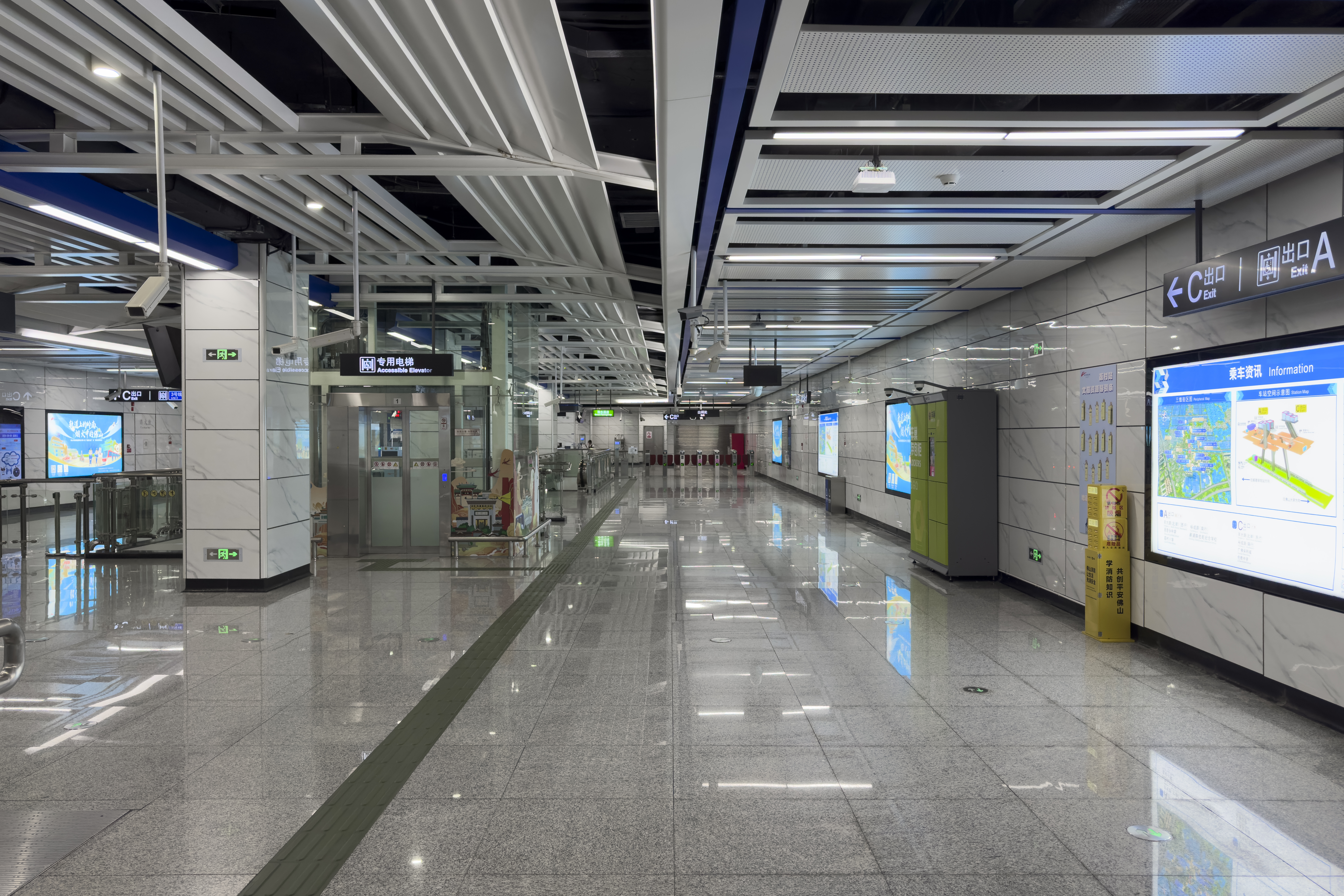
Concourse

== Station layout ==
The station has an island platform under Yangda Road.

G	-	Exits A & C
L1; Concourse	Lobby	Ticket Machines, Customer Service, Shops, Police Station, Security Facilities
L2; Platforms	Platform 1	3 towards Foshan University (Lunjiao)
L2; Platforms	Island platform, doors will open on the left
L2; Platforms	Platform 2	3 towards Shunde College Railway Station (The First People's Hospital of Shunde)

=== Exits ===
The station has 2 points of entry/exit, located on the northwest and southwest sides of the intersection of Yangda Road and Yucheng Road. Exit A is equipped with an elevator.

- A: Yucheng Road
- C: Yucheng Road
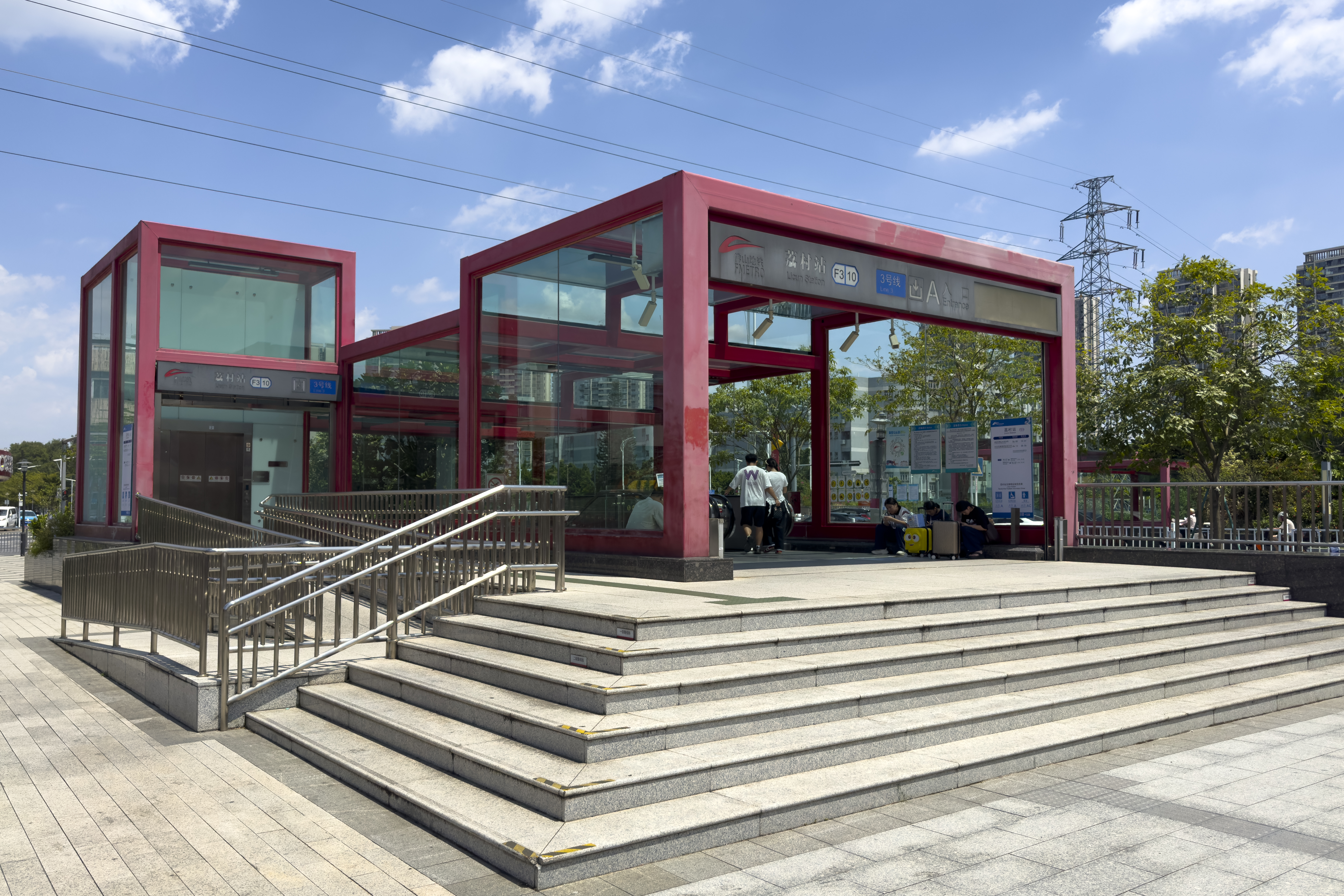
Entrance A

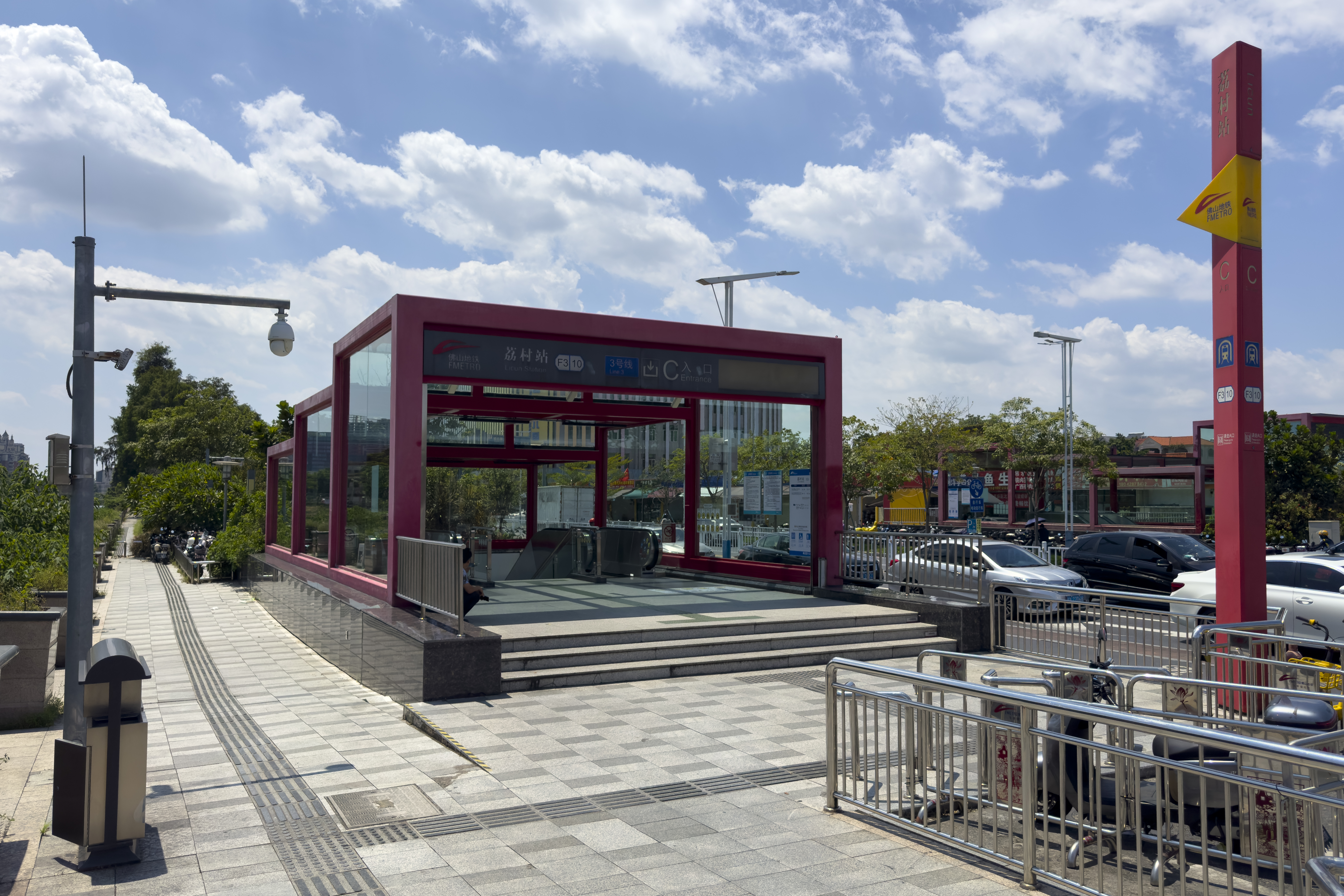
Entrance C

== History ==
The station started enclosure construction on 4 March 2017. The base slab was sealed on 4 July 2019, and the station topped out on 7 October the same year. On 16 September 2019, the left line tunnel between this station and Shunde Hospital (now The First People's Hospital of Shunde) station broke through. On 9 July 2020, the double line tunnel between this station and Lunjiao station broke through.

On 30 May 2022, the station completed the "three rights" transfer. On 28 December the same year, the station opened with the opening of Line 3.
