= Lunjiao station =

Foshan Metro Line 3 station

Lunjiao 伦教
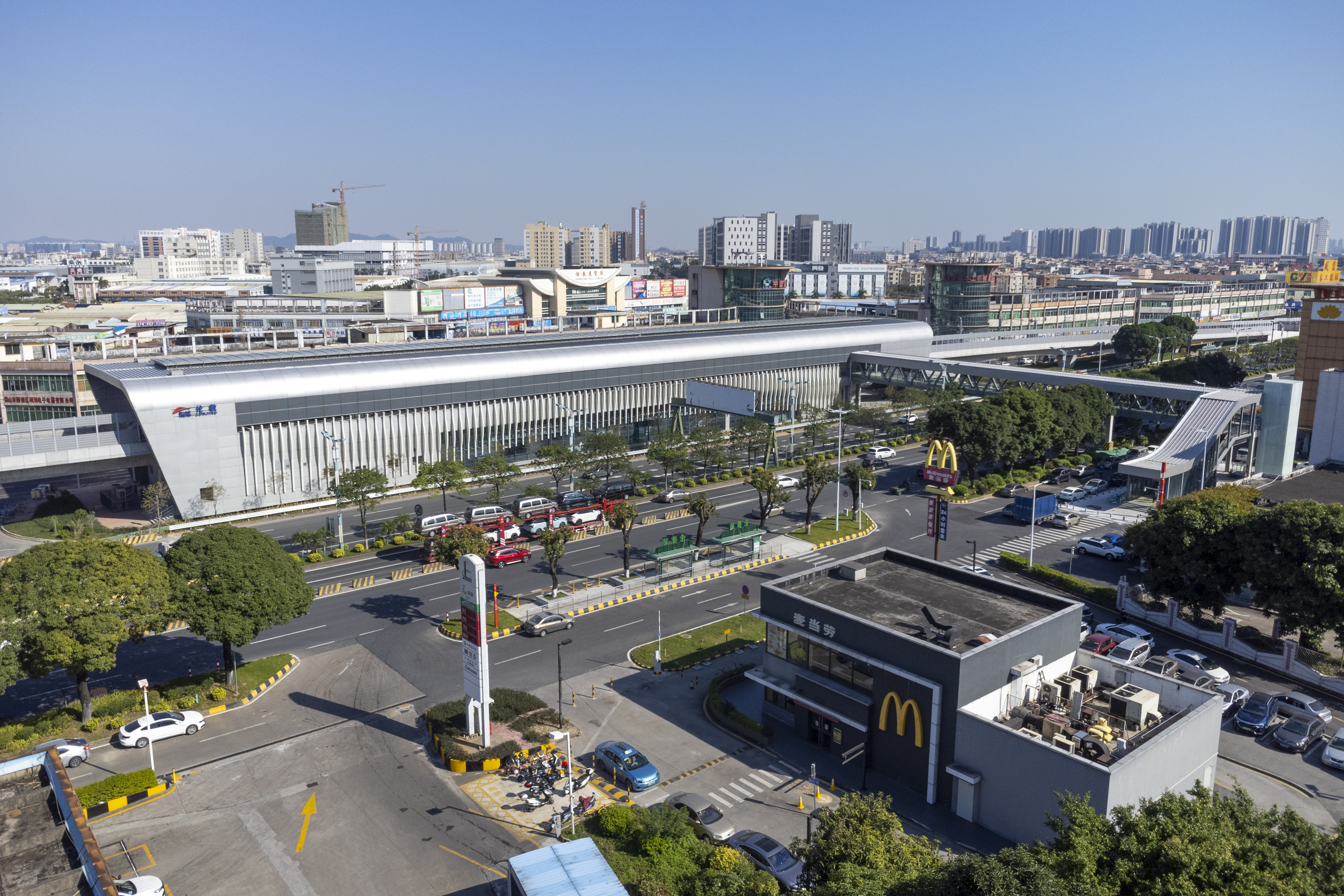
- Exterior

Chinese name
- Simplified Chinese: 伦教站
- Traditional Chinese: 倫教站
Transcriptions
Standard Mandarin
- Hanyu Pinyin: Lúnjiào Zhàn
Yue: Cantonese
- Yale Romanization: Lèuhngaau Jaahm
- Jyutping: Leon^{4}gaau^{3} Zaam^{6}

General information
- Location: South side of the intersection of Shunde Boulevard (顺德大道) and Zhenxing Road (振兴路), Lunjiao Subdistrict; Shunde District, Foshan, Guangdong; China
- Coordinates: 22°52′58.44″N 113°12′32.51″E
- Operator: Foshan Metro Operation Co., Ltd.
- Line: Line 3
- Platforms: 2 (2 side platforms)
- Tracks: 2

Construction
- Structure type: Elevated
- Accessible: Yes

Other information
- Station code: F311

History
- Opened: 28 December 2022 (3 years ago)

Services
Preceding station	Foshan Metro	Following station
Guangjiao towards Foshan University	Line 3	Licun towards Shunde College Railway Station
Location

Lunjiao station (simplified Chinese: 伦教站; traditional Chinese: 倫教站; pinyin: Lúnjiào Zhàn; Cantonese Yale: Lèuhngaau Jaahm) is an elevated station on Line 3 of Foshan Metro, located in Foshan's Shunde District. It opened on 28 December 2022.

== Theme ==
This station is one of the featured stations of the initial section of Line 3, with the theme of "Neon Dress Music and Dance", showing the style of Foshan's characteristic "Xiangyunsha silk" on the ceiling of the station.

== Name confusion ==
Some people get confused about this station, as its Chinese name for Lunjiao almost look like "倫敦" or "伦敦" (London).

== Station layout ==
The station has two side platforms above Shunde Boulevard.

F2; Platforms	Side platform, doors will open on the right
F2; Platforms	Platform 1	3 towards Foshan University (Guangjiao)
F2; Platforms	Platform 2	3 towards Shunde College Railway Station (Licun)
F2; Platforms	Side platform, doors will open on the right
G Concourse	Lobby	Ticket Machines, Customer Service, Shops, Police Station, Security Facilities, Exits A & B

=== Entrances/exits ===
The station has 2 points of entry/exit, located at the south side of the station building and the west side of Guangzhu Highway, of which Exit B consists of an overpass. Exit C on the east side of the station building will be opened in the future.

- A: Zhenhua West Road, Guangzhu Highway
- B: Zhenhua East Road, Guangzhu Highway

Exit B is equipped with an elevator.

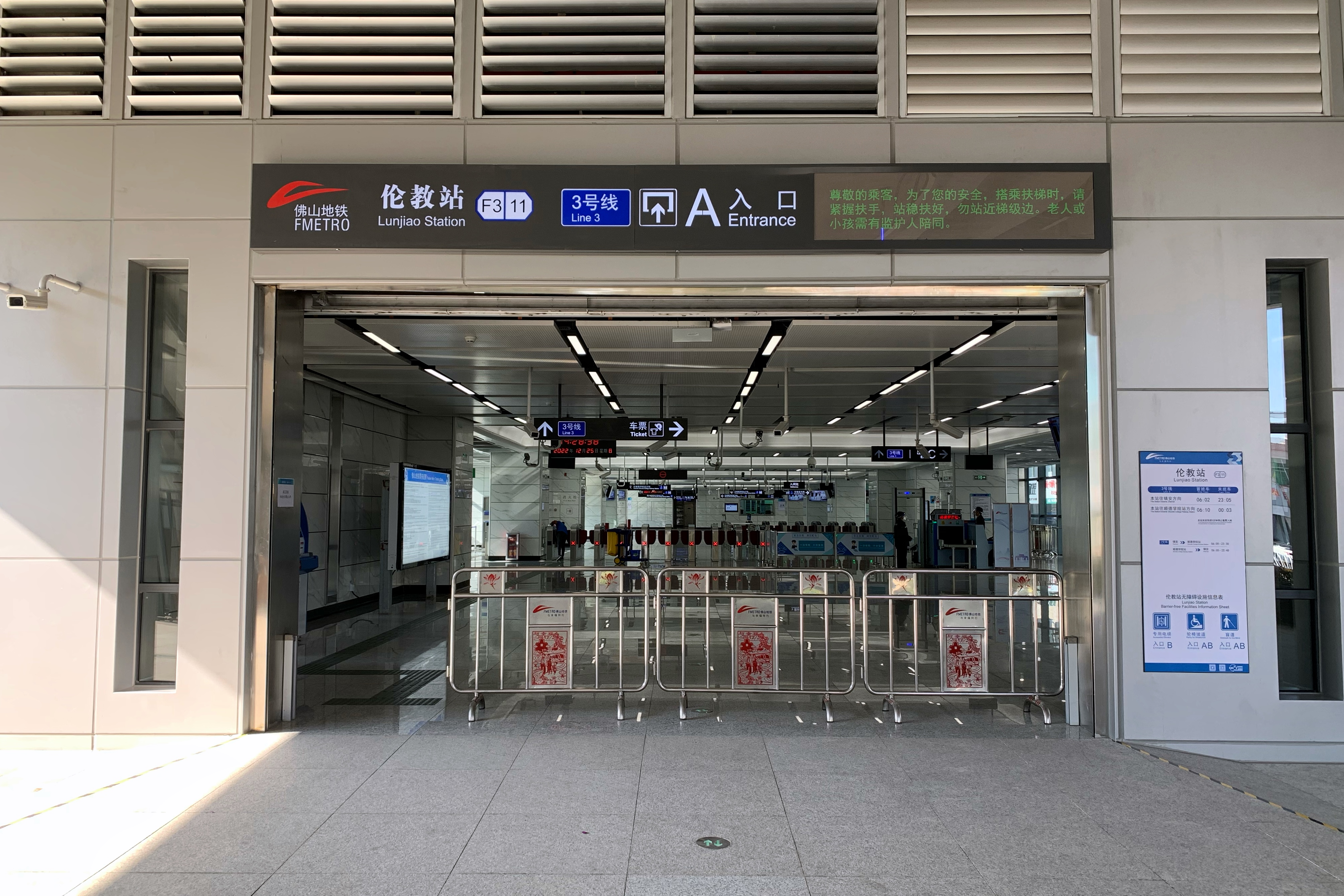
Entrance A

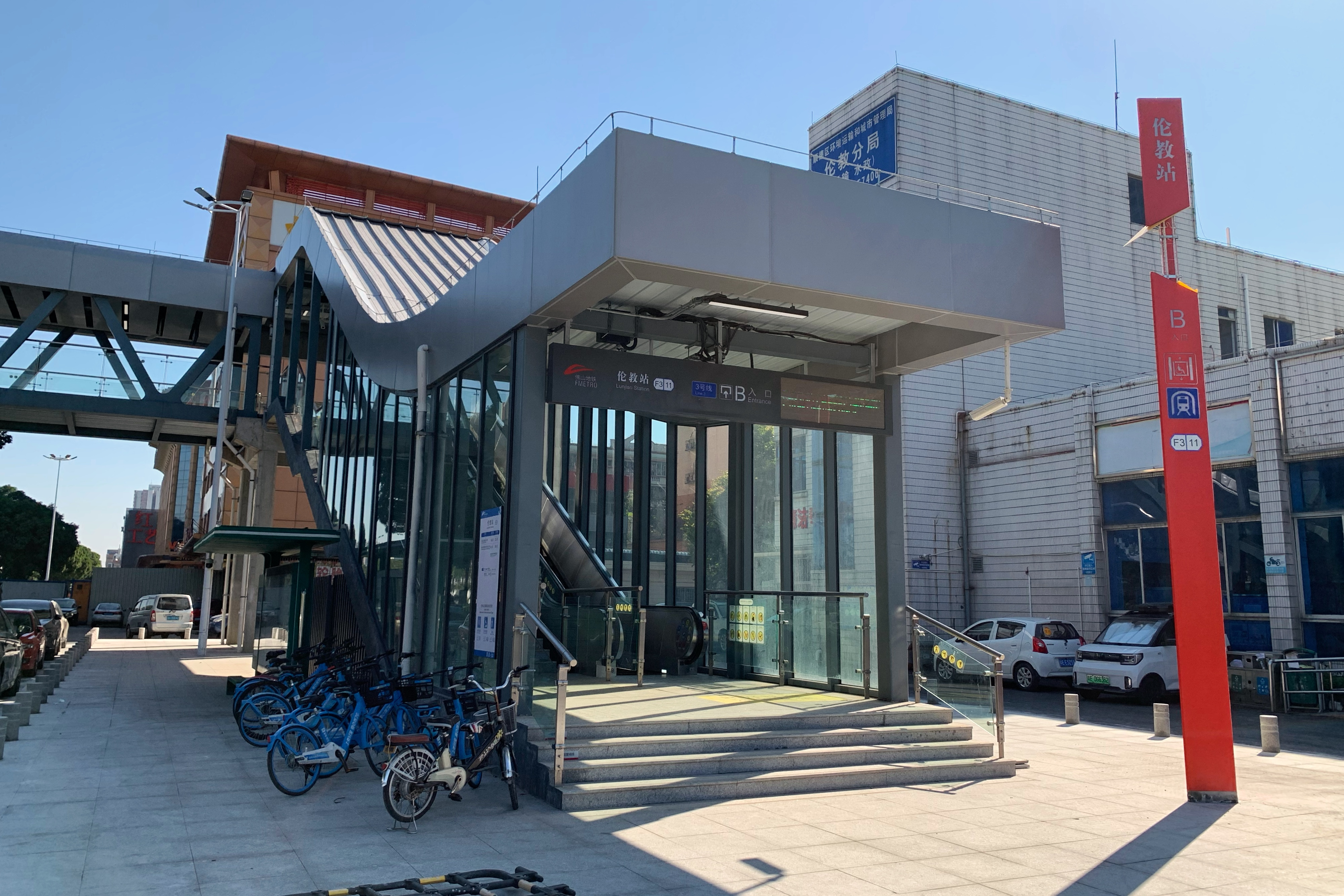
Entrance B

== History ==
The station started construction in May 2017, and it topped out on 1 January 2020. The civil engineering acceptance was completed on 18 May the same year, and the mechanical and electrical works began in July the same year.

On 30 May 2022, the station completed the "three rights" transfer. On 28 December the same year, the station opened with the opening of Line 3.

== Gallery ==
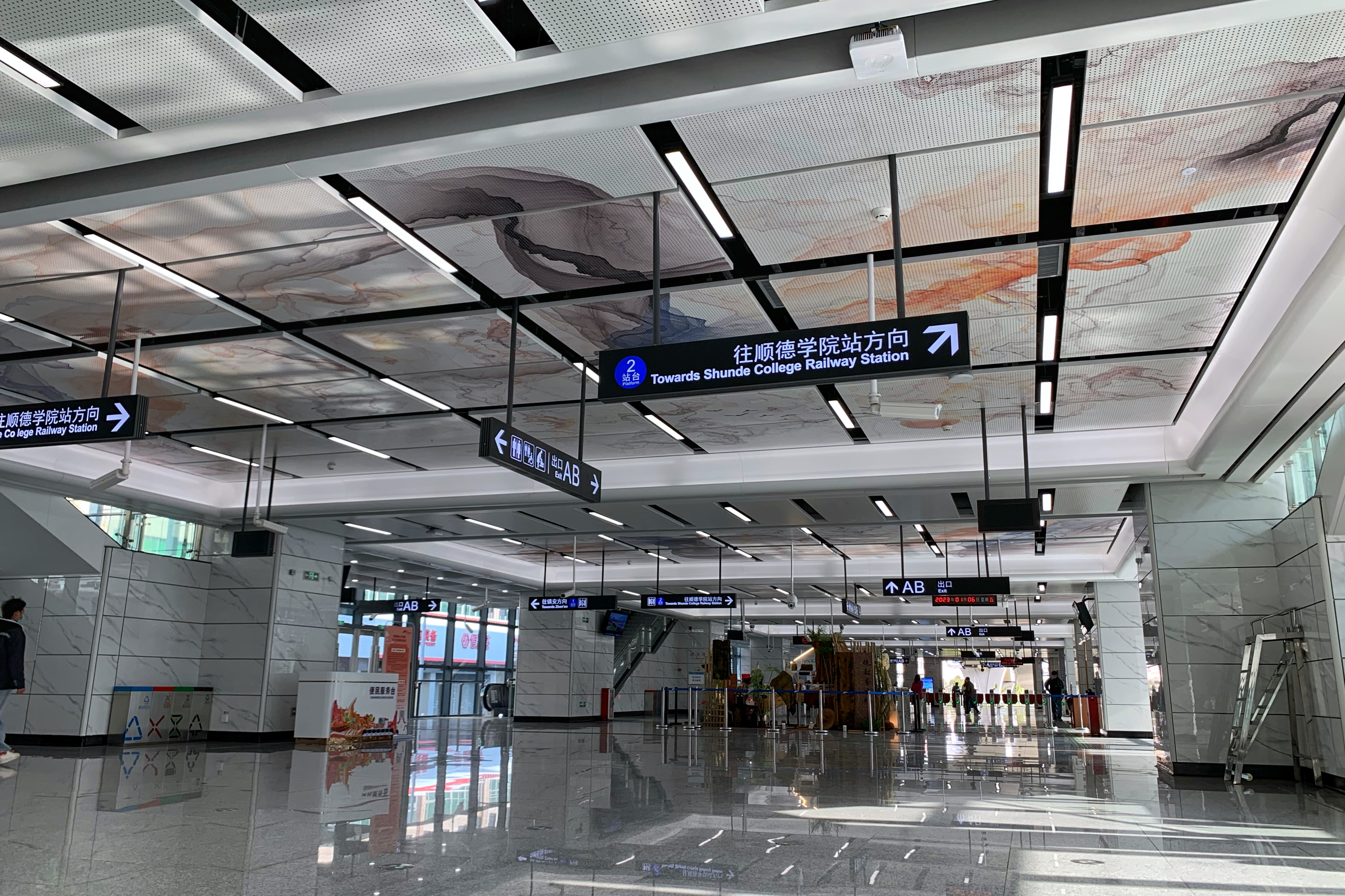
Concourse

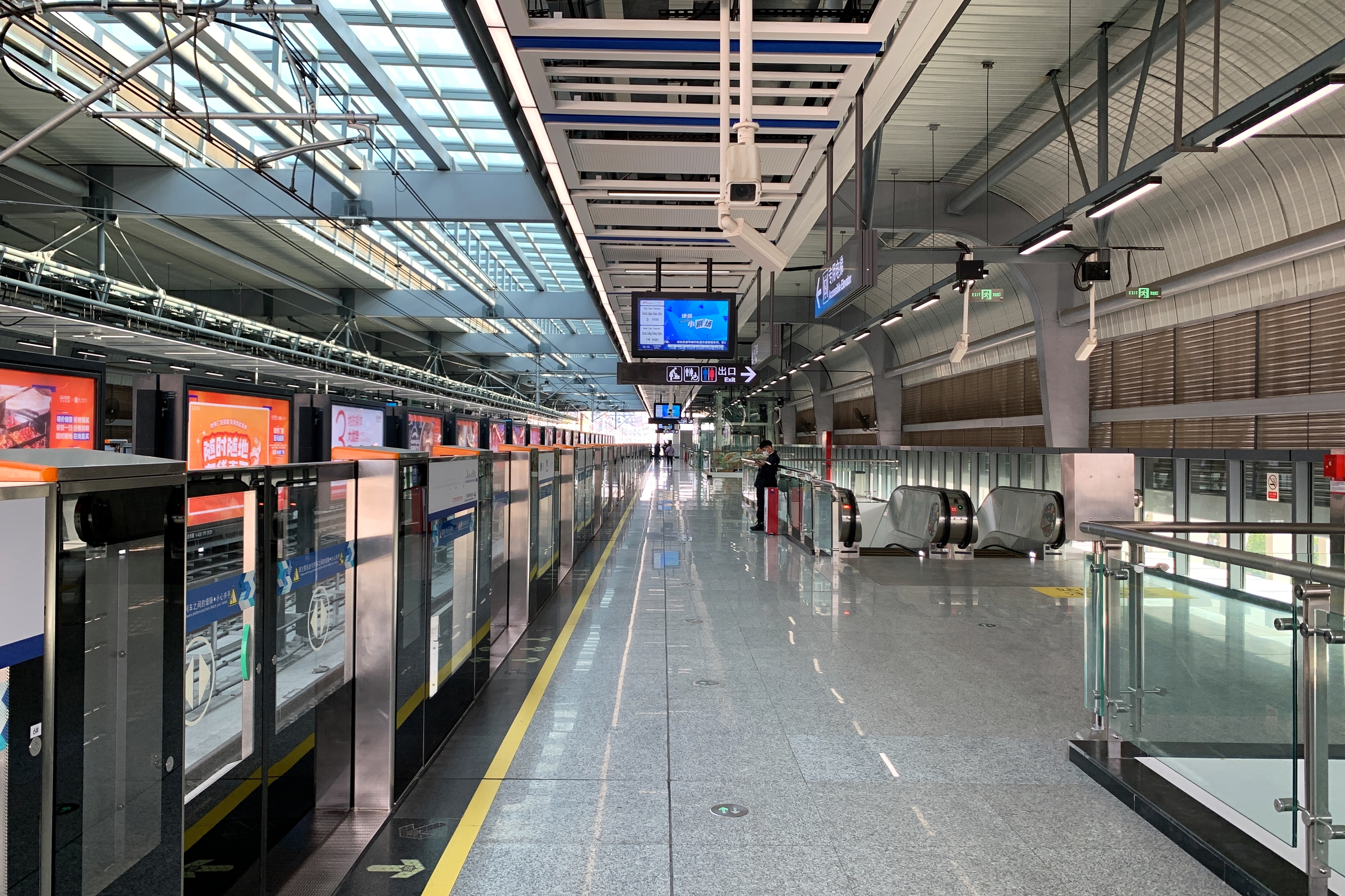
Platform 2 (towards Shunde College Railway Station)
