= Xingye Donglu station =

Foshan Metro Line 3 station

Xingye Donglu 兴业东路
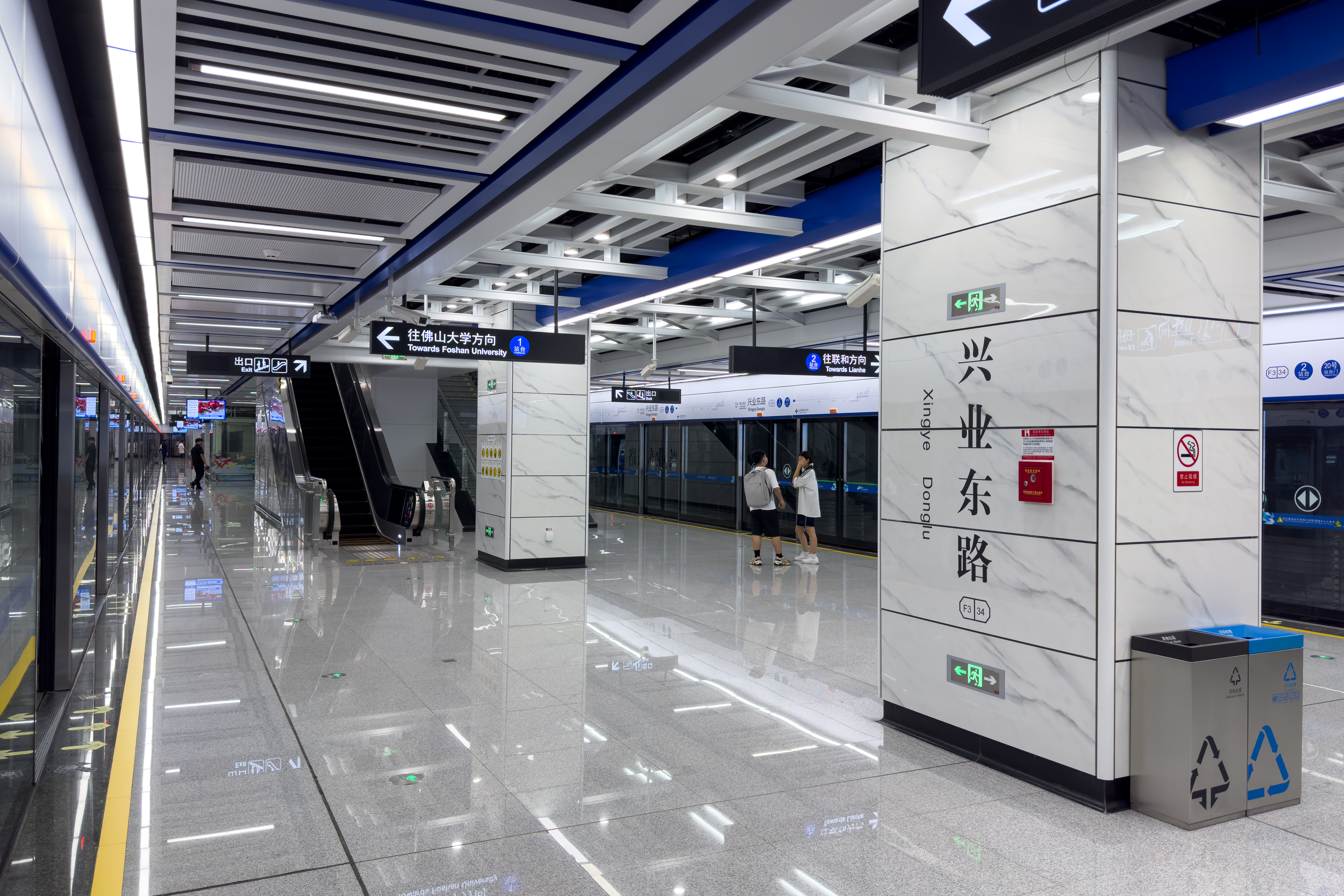
- Platform

Chinese name
- Simplified Chinese: 兴业东路站
- Traditional Chinese: 興業東路站
Transcriptions
Standard Mandarin
- Hanyu Pinyin: Xīngyè Dōnglù Zhàn
Yue: Cantonese
- Yale Romanization: Hīngyihp Dūnglǒu Jaahm
- Jyutping: Hing^{1}yip^{6} Dung^{1}lou^{6} Zaam^{6}

General information
- Location: Xingye East Road (兴业东路), Shishan; Nanhai District, Foshan, Guangdong; China
- Coordinates: 23°5′32.82″N 113°1′22.04″E
- Operator: Foshan Metro Operation Co., Ltd.
- Line: Line 3
- Platforms: 2 (1 island platform)
- Tracks: 2

Construction
- Structure type: Underground
- Accessible: Yes

Other information
- Station code: F334

History
- Opened: 23 August 2024 (23 months ago)

Services
Preceding station	Foshan Metro	Following station
Kesheng Lu towards Foshan University	Line 3	Foshan West Railway Station towards Shunde College Railway Station
Location

Xingye Donglu station (simplified Chinese: 兴业东路站; traditional Chinese: 興業東路站; pinyin: Xīngyè Dōnglù Zhàn; Cantonese Yale: Hīngyihp Dūnglǒu Jaahm; lit. 'Xingye East Road station') is a station on Line 3 of Foshan Metro, located in Foshan's Nanhai District. It opened on 23 August 2024.

== Station layout ==
The station has an island platform under Xingye East Road.

G	-	Exits A, C & D
L1; Concourse	Lobby	Ticket Machines, Customer Service, Shops, Police Station, Security Facilities
L2	-	Station Equipment
L3; Platforms	Platform 1	3 towards Foshan University (Kesheng Lu)
L3; Platforms	Island platform, doors will open on the left
L3; Platforms	Platform 2	3 towards Shunde College Railway Station (Foshan West Railway Station)

=== Entrances/exits ===
The station has 3 points of entry/exit, lettered A, C and D, located on the north and south sides of Xingye East Road. Exits C and D are equipped with elevators.

- A: Xingye Road
- C: Xingye Road
- D: Xingye Road

== History ==
When Line 3 was approved in 2012, this station was not included. In 2015, the planning of Line 3 was changed, and this station was added to the line, known then as Xingye Lu station. In 2022 the station name was adjusted to Xingye Donglu station.

The station officially started construction on 17 December 2016, completed the pouring of the first base plate on 30 April 2019, and the main structure topped out on 27 April 2021.

The station opened on 23 August 2024 as part of the section from "Lianhe to Foshan University". (Note: Prior to opening, it was known as part of the 'rear section' or 'section under construction')
