= Kesheng Lu station =

Foshan Metro Line 3 station

Kesheng Lu 科盛路
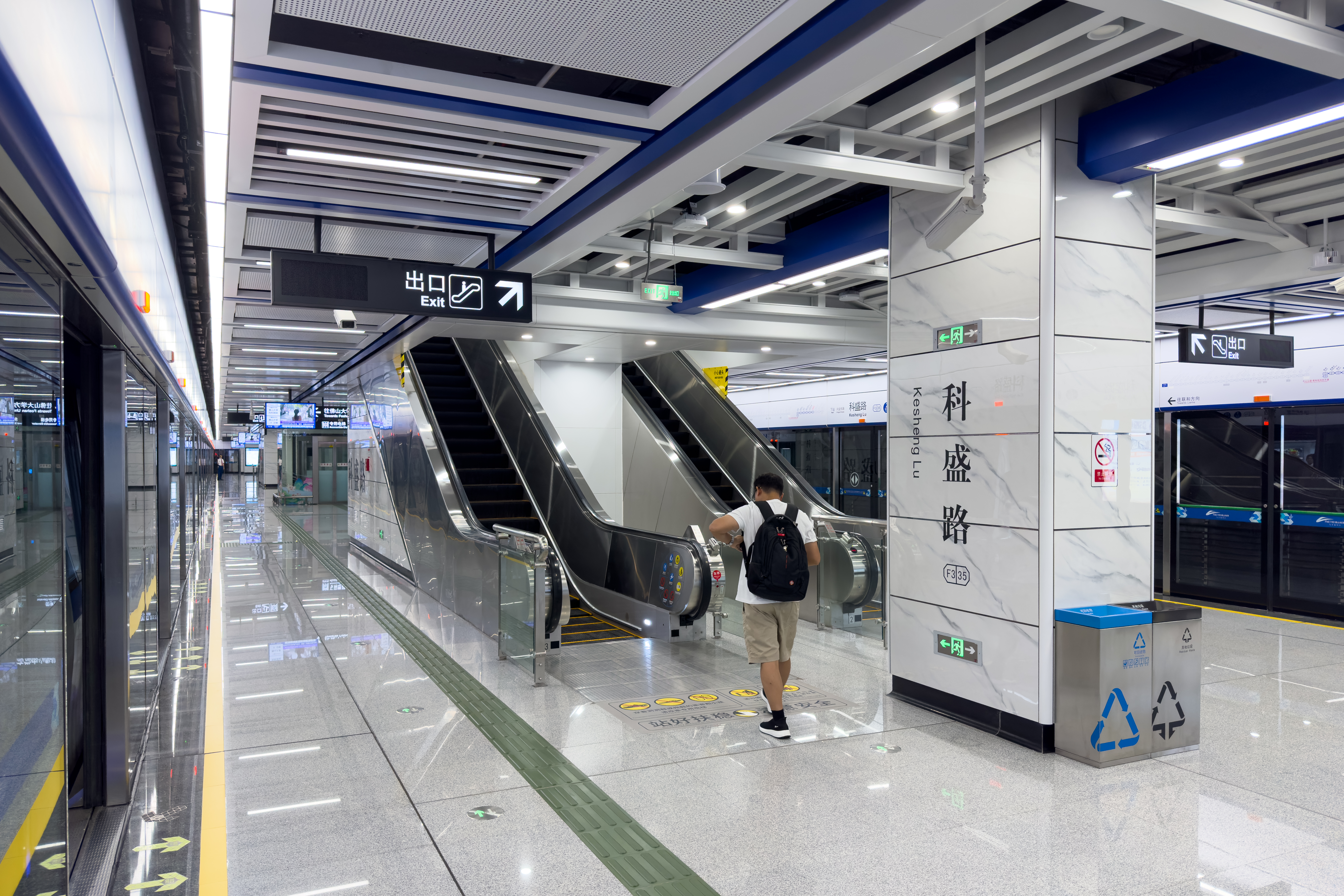
- Platform

Chinese name
- Chinese: 科盛路站
Transcriptions
Standard Mandarin
- Hanyu Pinyin: Kēshèng Lù Zhàn
Yue: Cantonese
- Yale Romanization: Fōsihng Lǒu Jaahm
- Jyutping: Fo^{1}sing^{6} Lou^{6} Zaam^{6}

General information
- Location: Shishan Industrial Avenue (狮山工业大道), Shishan; Nanhai District, Foshan, Guangdong; China
- Coordinates: 23°6′36.04″N 113°1′7.03″E
- Operator: Foshan Metro Operation Co., Ltd.
- Line: Line 3
- Platforms: 2 (1 island platform)
- Tracks: 2

Construction
- Structure type: Underground
- Accessible: Yes

Other information
- Station code: F335

History
- Opened: 23 August 2024 (23 months ago)
- Former names: Taiping (太平)

Services
| Preceding station | Foshan Metro | Following station |
|---|---|---|
| Bo'ai Zhonglu towards Foshan University | Line 3 | Xingye Donglu towards Shunde College Railway Station |
Location

Kesheng Lu station (Chinese: 科盛路站; pinyin: Kēshèng Lù Zhàn; Cantonese Yale: Fōsihng Lǒu Jaahm) is a station on Line 3 of Foshan Metro, located in Foshan's Nanhai District. It opened on 23 August 2024.

== Station layout ==
The station has an island platform under a planned road.

| G | - | Exits A & D |
| L1; Concourse | Lobby | Ticket Machines, Customer Service, Shops, Police Station, Security Facilities |
| L2; Platforms | Platform 1 | 3 towards Foshan University (Bo'ai Zhonglu) |
| L2; Platforms | Island platform, doors will open on the left |
| L2; Platforms | Platform 2 | 3 towards Shunde College Railway Station (Xingye Donglu) |

=== Entrances/exits ===
The station will have a total of 4 points of entry/exit, lettered A-D, which will be located on the east and west sides of a planned road. In its initial opening, the station opened Exits A and D. Exit A is equipped with an elevator.

- A: Shishan Industrial Avenue North
- D: Shishan Industrial Avenue North

== History ==
The station was called Taiping station during the planning and construction phase. When Line 3 was approved in 2012, this station was already implemented and was an elevated station.

In 2015, the planning of Line 3 was changed, and the line still has this station, but the station has become an underground station. In 2022 the station name was adjusted to Kesheng Lu station.

On 19 October 2018, the pouring of the first base plate of the station was completed, laying the foundations for the construction stage of the main structure. On 22 April 2019, the main structure topped out.

The station opened on 23 August 2024 as part of the section from "Lianhe to Foshan University". (Note: Prior to opening, it was known as part of the 'rear section' or 'section under construction')
