= Guangjiao station =

Foshan Metro Line 3 station

Guangjiao 广教
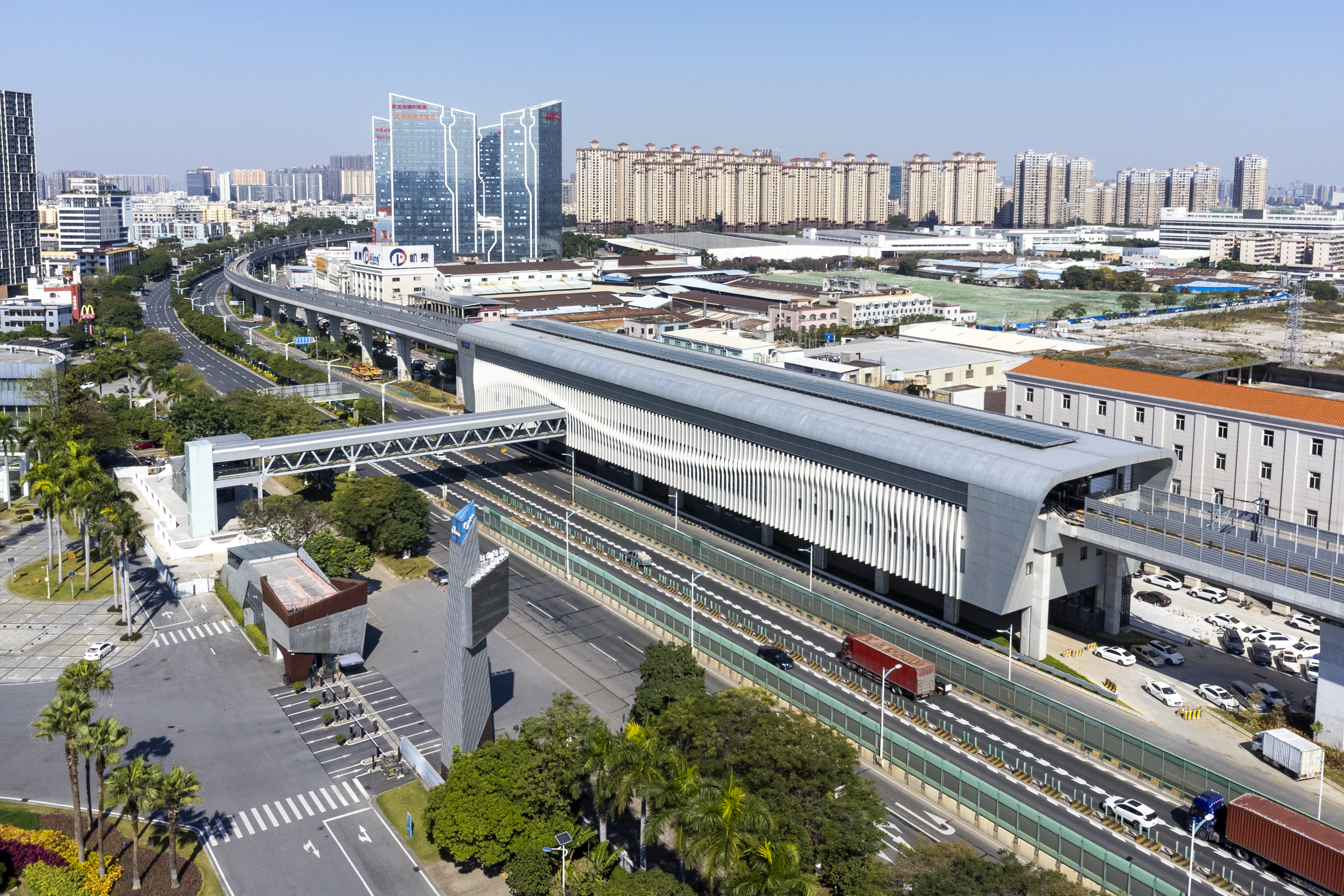
- Exterior

Chinese name
- Simplified Chinese: 广教站
- Traditional Chinese: 廣教站
Transcriptions
Standard Mandarin
- Hanyu Pinyin: Guǎngjiào Zhàn
Yue: Cantonese
- Yale Romanization: Gwónggaau Jaahm
- Jyutping: Gwong^{2}gaau^{3} Zaam^{6}

General information
- Location: Southeast side of the intersection of Guangzhu Highway (广珠公路) and Guangjiao Industrial Boulevard (广教工业大道), Beijiao; Shunde District, Foshan, Guangdong; China
- Coordinates: 22°54′42.37″N 113°12′26.86″E
- Operator: Foshan Metro Operation Co., Ltd.
- Line: Line 3
- Platforms: 2 (2 side platforms)
- Tracks: 2

Construction
- Structure type: Elevated
- Accessible: Yes

Other information
- Station code: F312

History
- Opened: 28 December 2022 (3 years ago)
- Former names: Sanhongqi (三洪奇)

Services
Preceding station	Foshan Metro	Following station
Beijiao Park towards Foshan University	Line 3	Lunjiao towards Shunde College Railway Station
Location

Guangjiao station (simplified Chinese: 广教站; traditional Chinese: 廣教站; pinyin: Guǎngjiào Zhàn; Cantonese Yale: Gwónggaau Jaahm) is an elevated station on Line 3 of Foshan Metro, located in Foshan's Shunde District. It opened on 28 December 2022.

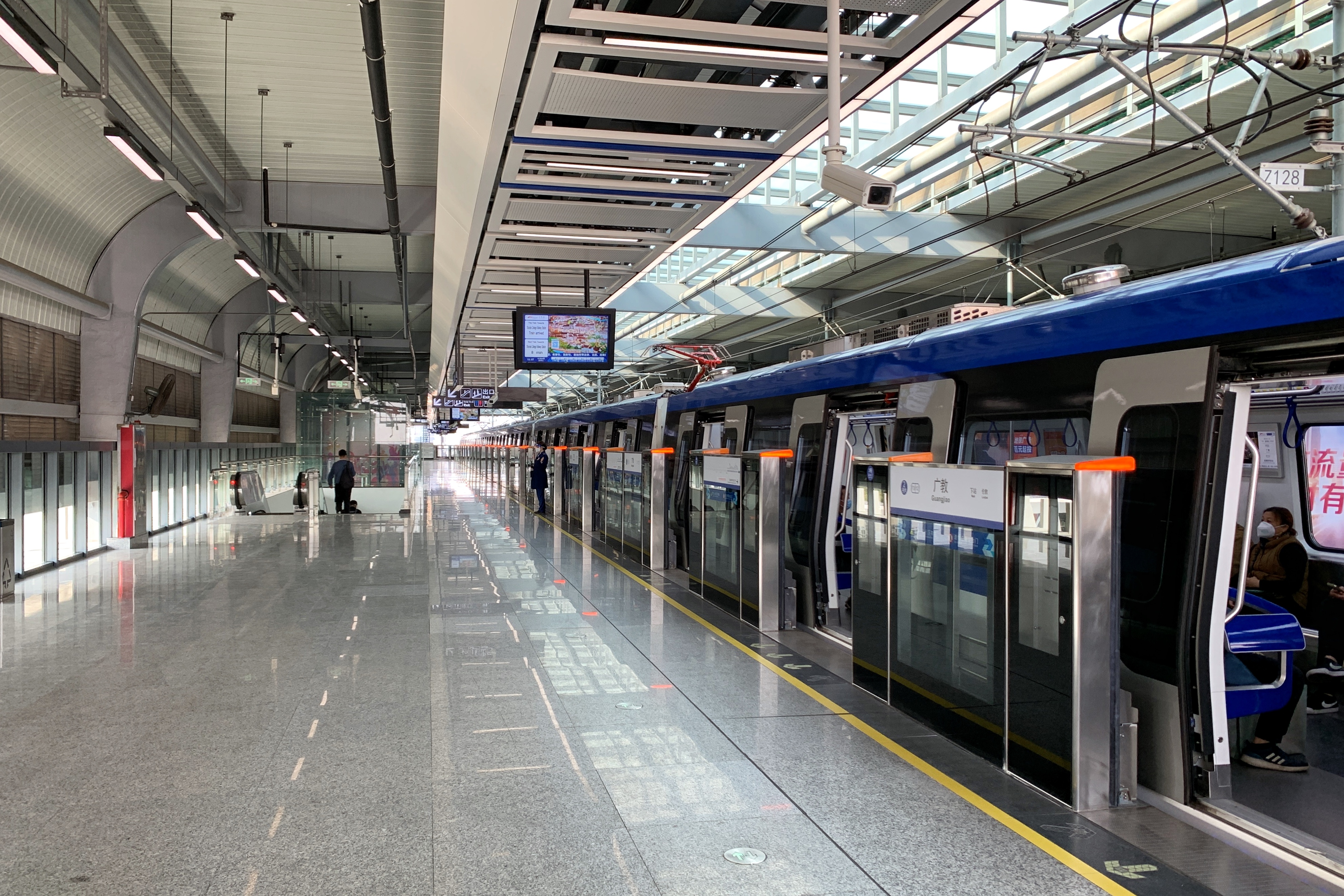
Platform 2 (towards Shunde College Railway Station)

== Station layout ==
The station has two side platforms above Guangzhu Highway.

F3; Platforms	Side platform, doors will open on the right
F3; Platforms	Platform 1	3 towards Foshan University (Beijiao Park)
F3; Platforms	Platform 2	3 towards Shunde College Railway Station (Lunjiao)
F3; Platforms	Side platform, doors will open on the right
F2; Concourse	Lobby	Ticket Machines, Customer Service, Police Station, Security Facilities
G	-	Exits A, B1, B2

=== Entrances/exits ===
The station has 3 points of entry/exit, located on the northwest and northeast sides of the station building, of which Exit A consists of an overpass. All exits are equipped with elevators.

- A: Guangzhu Highway
- B1: Guangzhu Highway
- B2: Guangzhu Highway

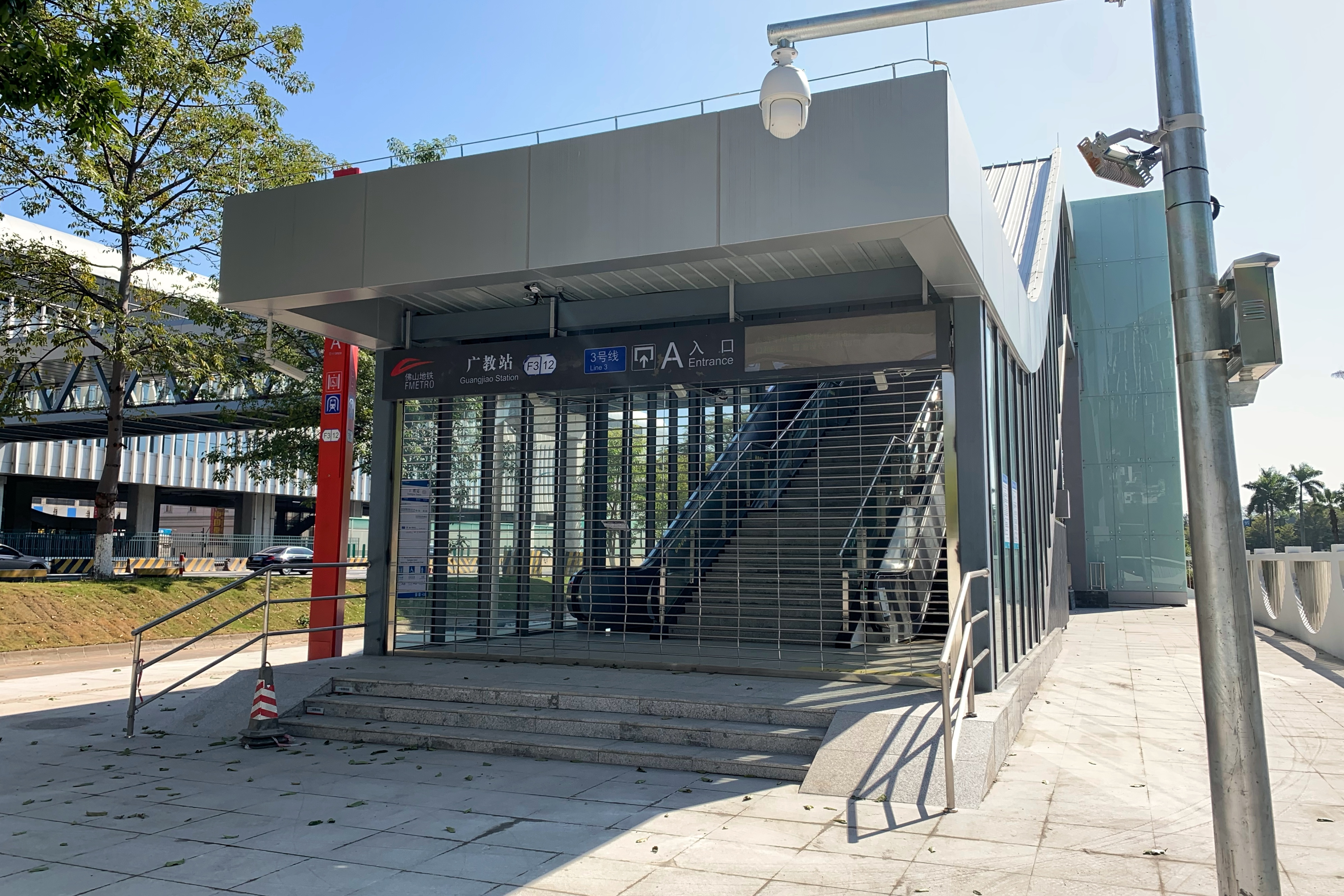
Entrance A

== History ==
The station was called Sanhongqi station during the planning and construction phase. It started construction in April 2017. In 2022, the station was renamed to Lunjiao station.

On 28 December 2022, the station opened with the opening of Line 3.
