= Nanhai University Town station =

Foshan Metro Line 3 station

Nanhai University Town 南海大学城
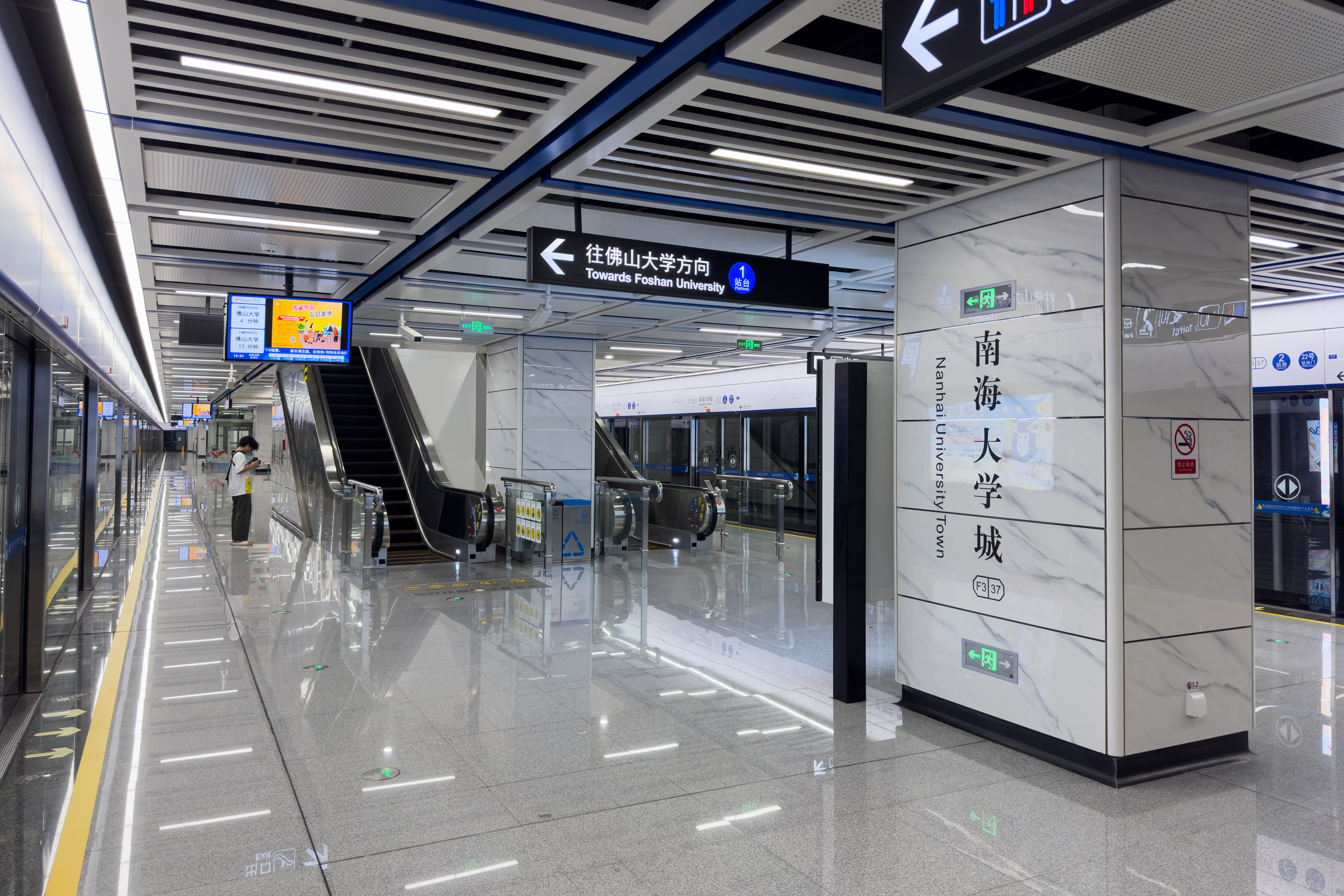
- Platform

Chinese name
- Simplified Chinese: 南海大学城站
- Traditional Chinese: 南海大學城站
Transcriptions
Standard Mandarin
- Hanyu Pinyin: Nánhǎi Dàxuéchéng Zhàn
Yue: Cantonese
- Yale Romanization: Nàahmhói Daaihhohksìhng Jaahm
- Jyutping: Naam^{4}hoi^{2} Daai^{6}hok^{6}sing^{4} Zaam^{6}

General information
- Location: Next to Jinhong Road (金虹路), Shishan; Nanhai District, Foshan, Guangdong; China
- Coordinates: 23°7′8.44″N 113°1′12.58″E
- Operator: Foshan Metro Operation Co., Ltd.
- Line: Line 3
- Platforms: 2 (1 island platform)
- Tracks: 2

Construction
- Structure type: Underground
- Accessible: Yes

Other information
- Station code: F337

History
- Opened: 23 August 2024 (23 months ago)

Services
Preceding station	Foshan Metro	Following station
Foshan University Terminus	Line 3	Bo'ai Zhonglu towards Shunde College Railway Station
Location

Nanhai University Town station (simplified Chinese: 南海大学城站; traditional Chinese: 南海大學城站; pinyin: Nánhǎi Dàxuéchéng Zhàn; Cantonese Yale: Nàahmhói Daaihhohksìhng Jaahm) is a station on Line 3 of Foshan Metro, located in Foshan's Nanhai District. It opened on 23 August 2024.

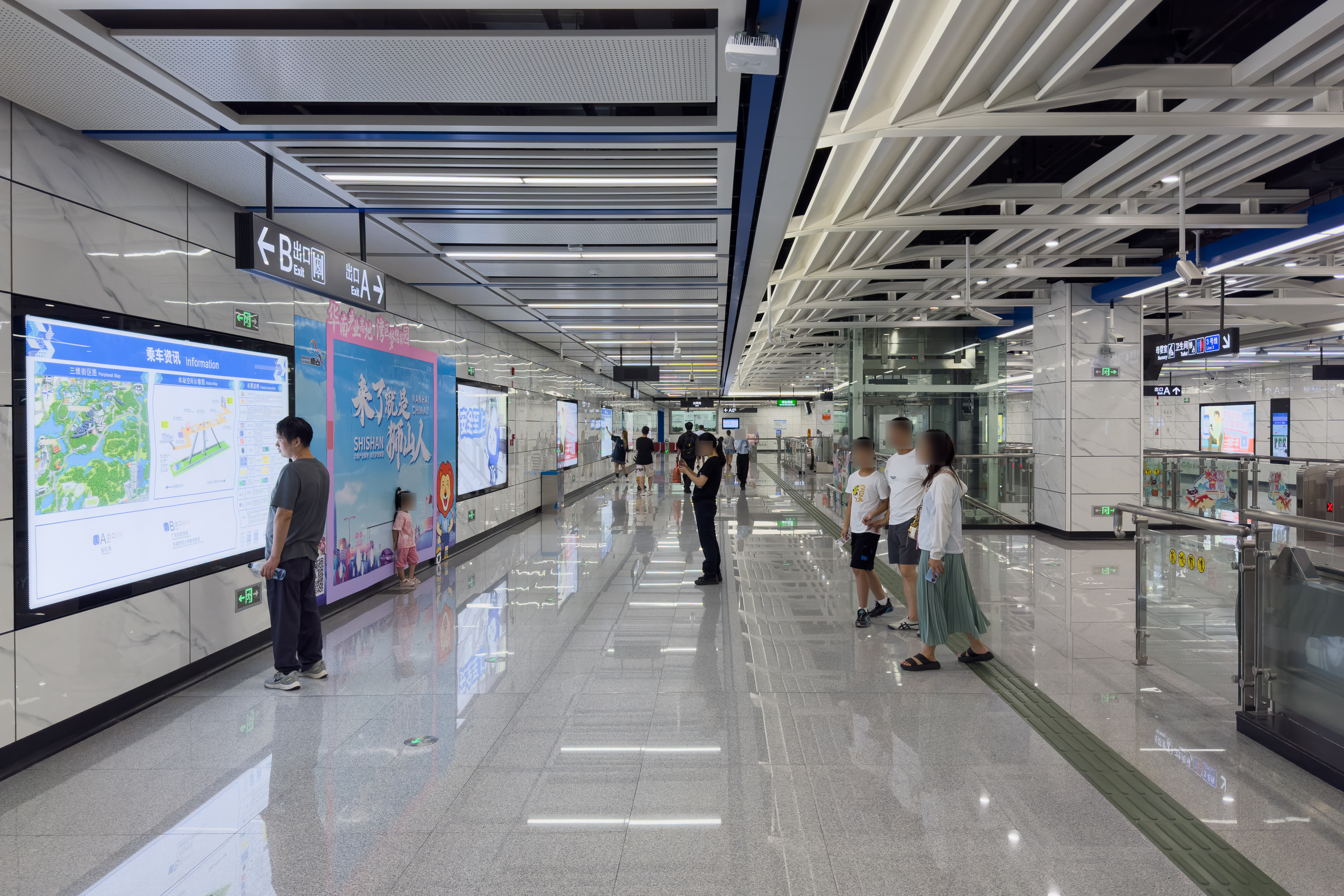
Concourse

== Station layout ==
The station has an island platform under Jinhong Road.

G	-	Exits A & B
L1; Concourse	Lobby	Ticket Machines, Customer Service, Shops, Police Station, Security Facilities
L2	-	Station Equipment
L3; Platforms	Platform 1	3 towards Foshan University (terminus)
L3; Platforms	Island platform, doors will open on the left
L3; Platforms	Platform 2	3 towards Shunde College Railway Station (Bo'ai Zhonglu)

=== Entrances/exits ===
The station has 2 points of entry/exit, lettered A and B, located on the north and south sides of Jinhong Road. Exit B is equipped with an elevator.

- A: Jinhong Road
- B: Jinhong Road, Neusoft Institute Guangdong, South China Normal University Nanhai Campus
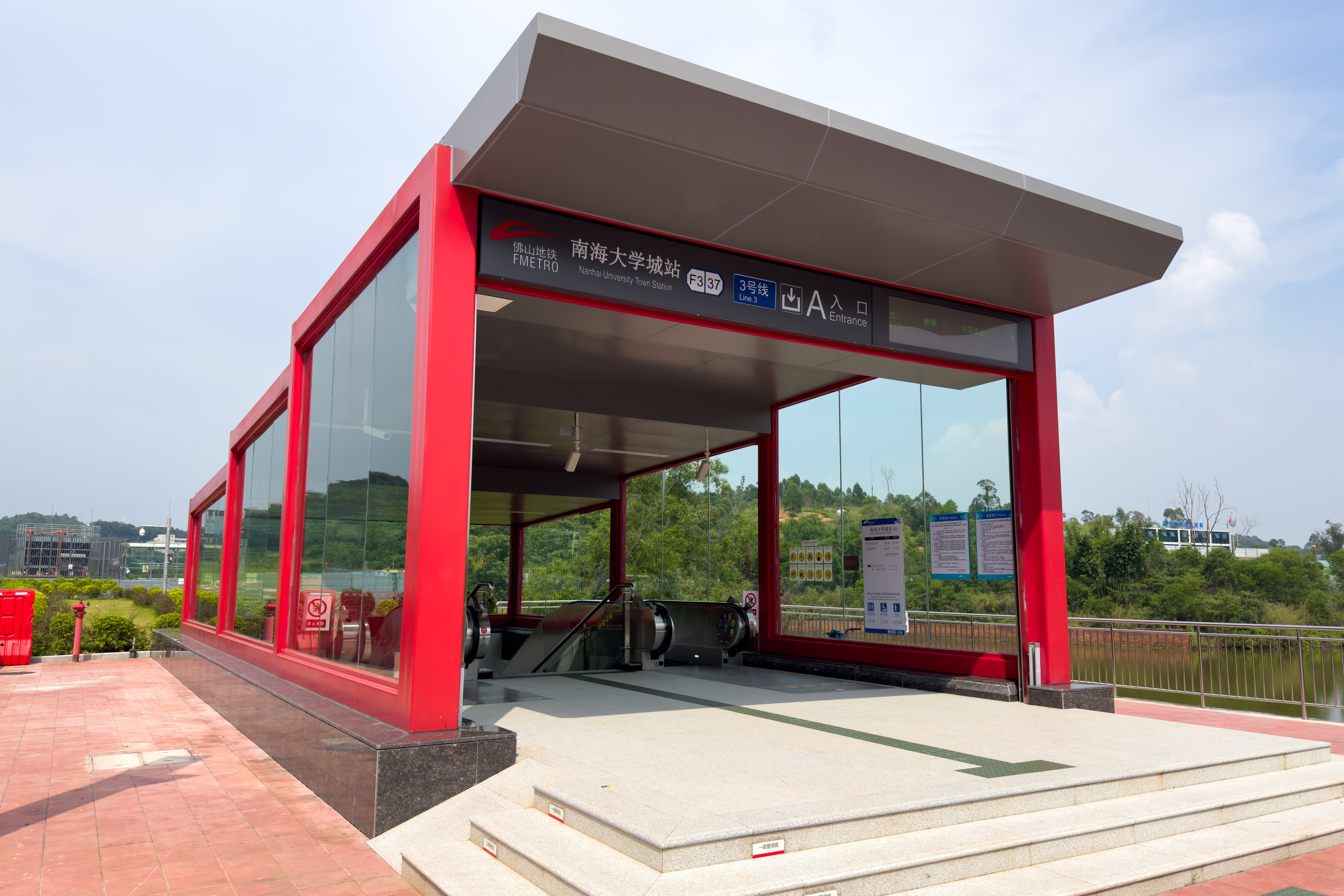
Entrance A

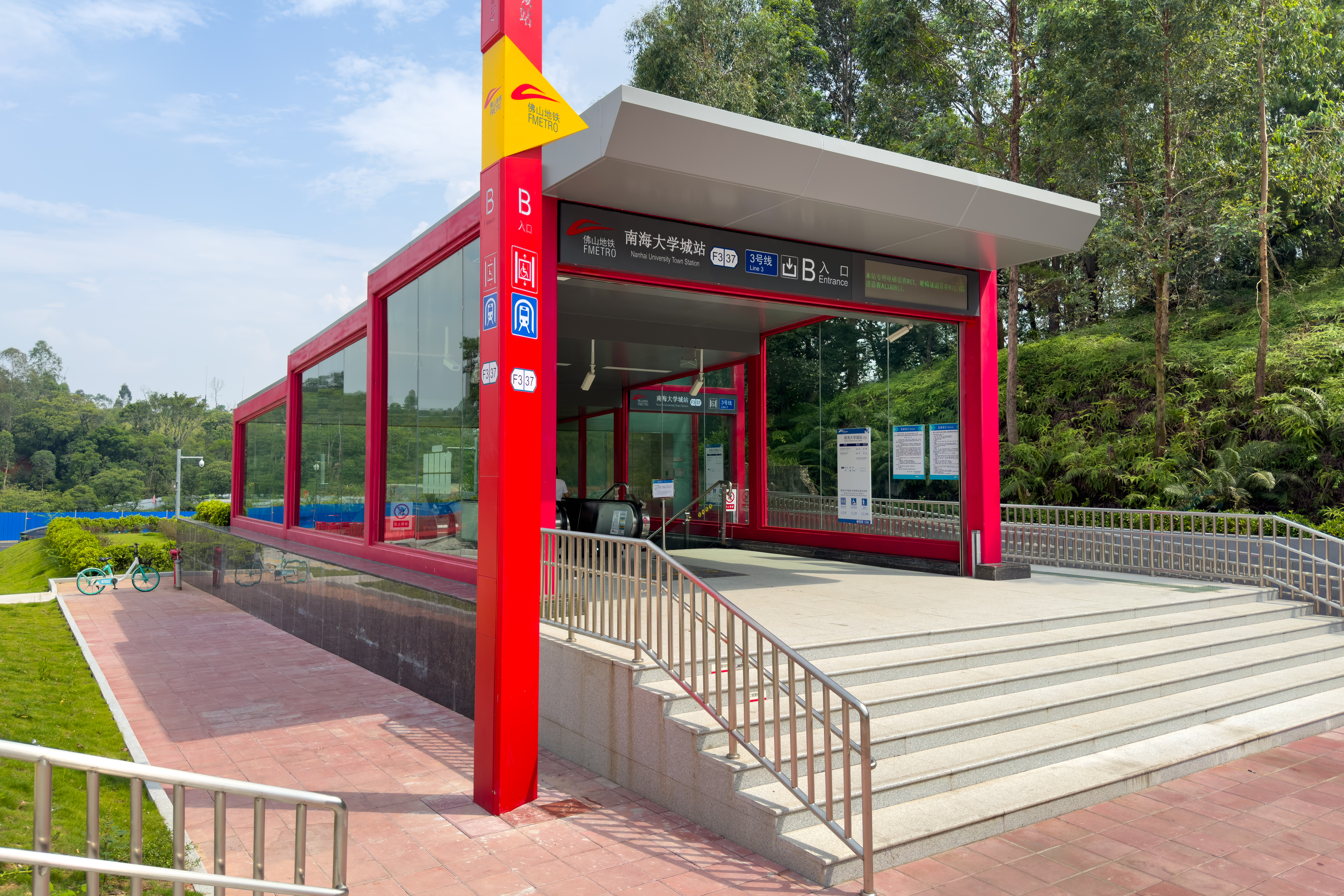
Entrance B

== History ==
In the initial planning of Line 3, the northern terminus of the line was at University Town station. However, when the line was approved in 2012, it terminated at Shishan station (now Bo'ai Zhonglu) south of this station. In 2013, Line 3 was decided to extend to the north, which meant the station was restored, and it was planned to be built as an elevated station. In 2015, the plan of Line 3 was changed, and this station was retained. In 2019, the station was changed from an elevated to an underground station. In 2022 the station name was adjusted to Nanhai University Town station.

On 25 September 2021, the underground diaphragm wall of the envelope structure of the station was enclosed. On 28 April 2022, the base slab was sealed. On 5 August 2022, the main structure topped out.

The station opened on 23 August 2024 as part of the section from "Lianhe to Foshan University". (Note: Prior to opening, it was known as part of the 'rear section' or 'section under construction')
