= Bo'ai Zhonglu station =

Foshan Metro Line 3 station

Bo'ai Zhonglu 博爱中路
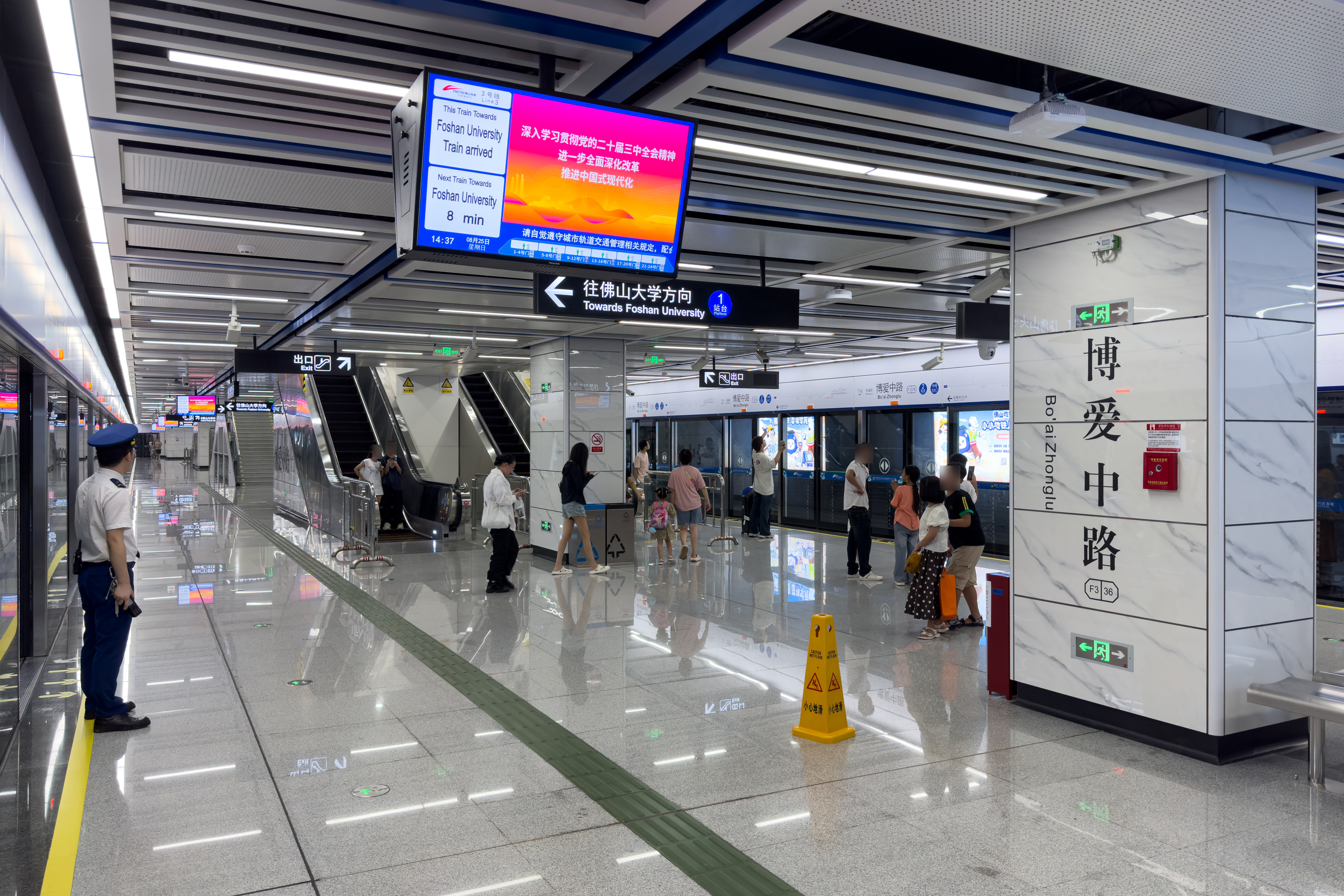
- Platform

Chinese name
- Simplified Chinese: 博爱中路站
- Traditional Chinese: 博愛中路站
Transcriptions
Standard Mandarin
- Hanyu Pinyin: Bóài Zhōnglù Zhàn
Yue: Cantonese
- Yale Romanization: Bokgoi Zhōnglǒu Jaahm
- Jyutping: Bok^{3}ngoi^{3} Zung^{1}lou^{6} Zaam^{6}

General information
- Location: Intersection of Shishan Industrial Boulevard (狮山工业大道) (under planning) and Bo'ai East Road (博爱东路), Shishan; Nanhai District, Foshan, Guangdong; China
- Coordinates: 23°7′8.44″N 113°1′12.58″E
- Operator: Foshan Metro Operation Co., Ltd.
- Line: Line 3
- Platforms: 2 (1 island platform)
- Tracks: 2

Construction
- Structure type: Underground
- Accessible: Yes

Other information
- Station code: F336

History
- Opened: 23 August 2024 (23 months ago)
- Former names: Shishan (狮山)

Services
Preceding station	Foshan Metro	Following station
Nanhai University Town towards Foshan University	Line 3	Kesheng Lu towards Shunde College Railway Station
Location

Bo'ai Zhonglu station (simplified Chinese: 博爱中路站; traditional Chinese: 博愛中路站; pinyin: Bóài Zhōnglù Zhàn; Cantonese Yale: Bokgoi Zhōnglǒu Jaahm) is a station on Line 3 of Foshan Metro, located in Foshan's Nanhai District. It opened on 23 August 2024.

== Station layout ==
The station has an island platform under a planned road. The station has a double line to the north that connects to Shishan Depot.

G	-	Exits B-E
L1; Concourse	Lobby	Ticket Machines, Customer Service, Shops, Police Station, Security Facilities
L2; Platforms	Platform 1	3 towards Foshan University (Nanhai University Town)
L2; Platforms	Island platform, doors will open on the left
L2; Platforms	Platform 2	3 towards Shunde College Railway Station (Kesheng Lu)

=== Entrances/exits ===
The station will have a total of 5 points of entry/exit, lettered A-E, located on the east and west sides of a planned road. In its initial opening, the station opened Exits B-E. Exits C and E are equipped with elevators.

- B: Keyuan Road
- C: Bo'ai Middle Road
- D: Bo'ai Middle Road
- E: Bo'ai Middle Road
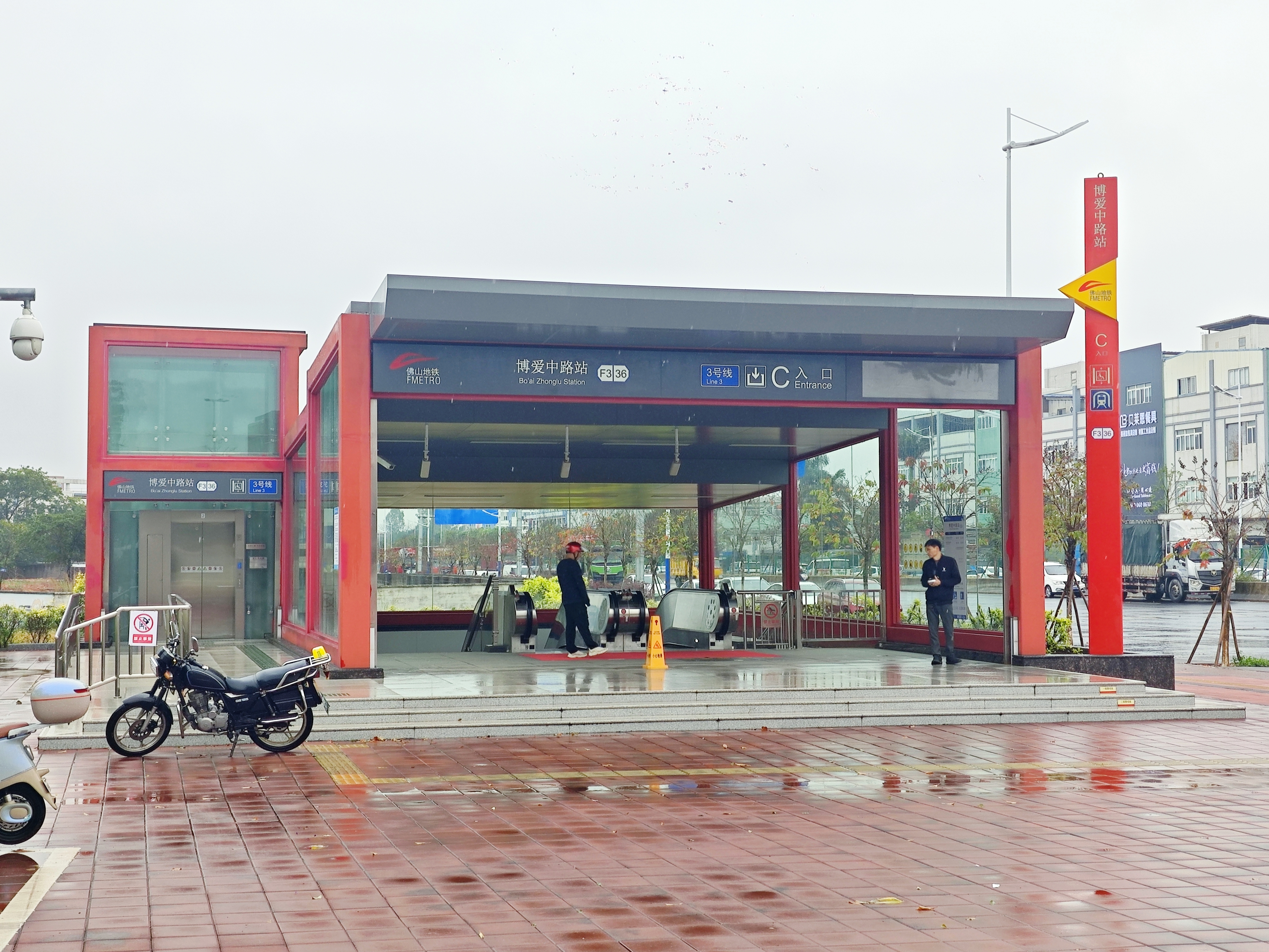
Entrance C

== History ==
When Line 3 was approved in 2012, the station was called Shishan Dong (East) station, and it was an elevated station and the northern terminus of the line. In 2013, Line 3 was decided to extend from this station to the north, and the station became an intermediate station. In 2015, the station was changed to an underground station and renamed to Shishan station. (Note: It is a different station to Shishan railway station on the Guangzhou-Zhaoqing Intercity Railway, the two stations are not alike) In 2022 the station name was adjusted to Bo'ai Zhonglu station.

Construction of the station officially started on 18 November 2016, and the groundbreaking ceremony of Line 3 was also held at the station on that day. On 4 October 2017, the first floor of the station was successfully poured, which laid the foundations to enter the main structure construction stage.

On 25 December 2018, the main structure of the site successfully topped out. On 18 October 2023, this site took the lead in launching comprehensive joint commissioning.

The station opened on 23 August 2024 as part of the section from "Lianhe to Foshan University". (Note: Prior to opening, it was known as part of the 'rear section' or 'section under construction')

== Future development ==
In the future, this station will become an interchange with Line 8. Line 8 is a long-term planning line, which is planned to be set underneath Middle Bo'ai Road and intersect with Line 3. During the partial construction of Line 3 of this station, the transfer interface was reserved at the concourse level.
