= Lunjiao Subdistrict =

Subdistrict of Foshan, China

Coordinates: 22.8677°N 113.2206°E

Alternative Chinese name
- Chinese: 倫教
- Postal: Lunkao
Transcriptions
Standard Mandarin
- Wade–Giles: Lun^{2}-chiao^{4}

Lunjiao (simplified Chinese: 伦教街道; traditional Chinese: 倫教街道) is a sub-district in Shunde District, Foshan, Guangdong Province, China. Situated in the eastern part of Shunde, it forms part of the city's urban zone. It has a resident population of 100,000 and a total area of 59 square kilometres (23 sq mi).
