= Foshan University station =

Foshan Metro Line 3 station

Foshan University 佛山大学
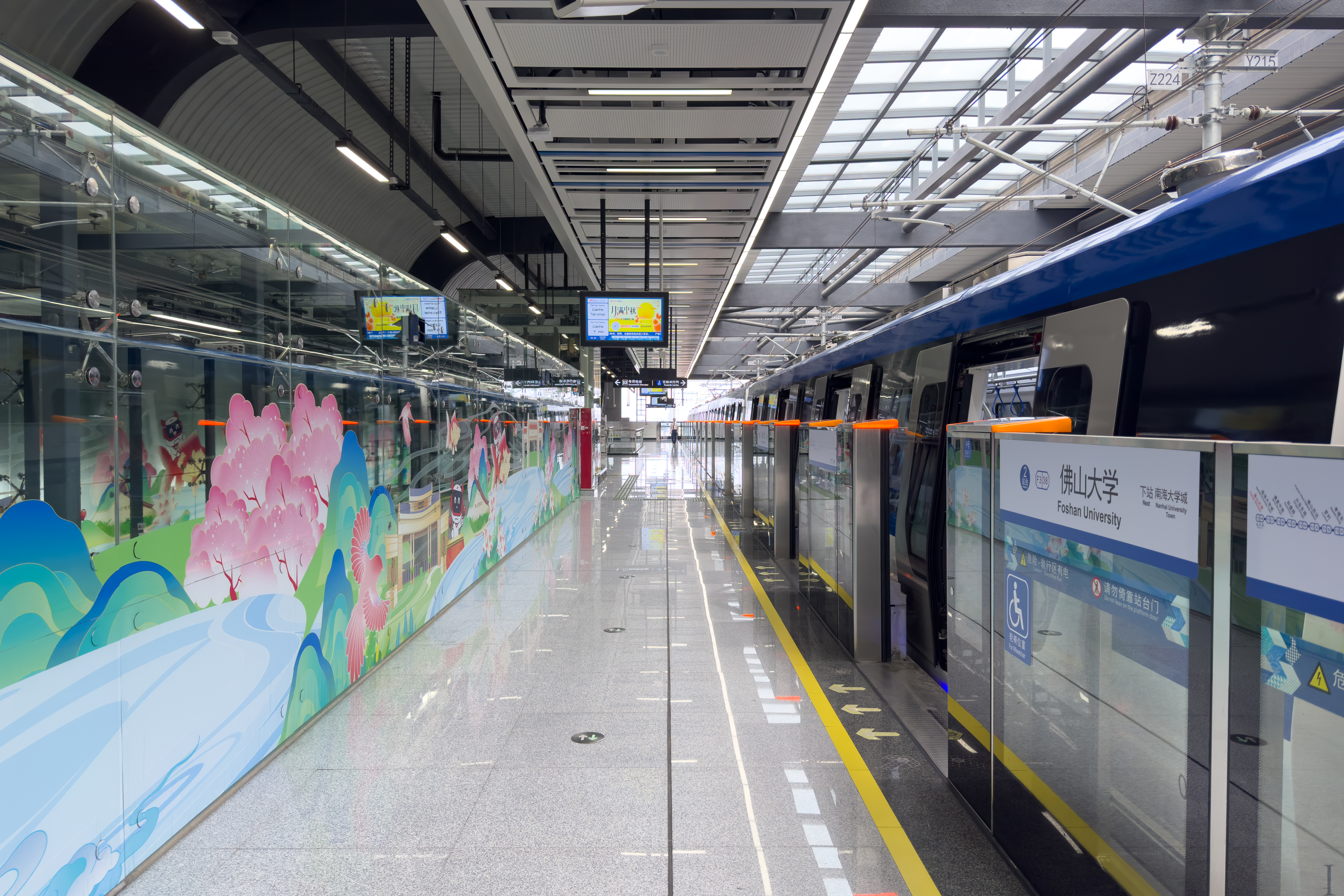
- Originating platform

Chinese name
- Simplified Chinese: 佛山大学站
- Traditional Chinese: 佛山大學站
Transcriptions
Standard Mandarin
- Hanyu Pinyin: Fóshān Dàxué Zhàn
Yue: Cantonese
- Yale Romanization: Fahtsāan Daaihhohk Jaahm
- Jyutping: Fat^{6}saan^{1} Daai^{6}hok^{6} Zaam^{6}

General information
- Location: Jinhong Road (金虹路), Shishan; Nanhai District, Foshan, Guangdong; China
- Coordinates: 23°8′53.41″N 113°2′57.80″E
- Operator: Foshan Metro Operation Co., Ltd.
- Line: Line 3
- Platforms: 2 (2 side platforms)
- Tracks: 2

Construction
- Structure type: Elevated
- Accessible: Yes

Other information
- Station code: F338

History
- Opened: 23 August 2024 (23 months ago)
- Former names: University of Science and Technology (科技学院), Foshan University of Science and Technology Xianxi Campus (佛科院仙溪校区), Foshan University Xianxi Campus (佛山大学仙溪校区)

Services
Preceding station	Foshan Metro	Following station
Terminus	Line 3	Nanhai University Town towards Shunde College Railway Station
Location

Foshan University station (simplified Chinese: 佛山大学站; traditional Chinese: 佛山大學站; pinyin: Fóshān Dàxué Zhàn; Cantonese Yale: Fahtsāan Daaihhohk Jaahm) is an elevated station on Line 3 of Foshan Metro, located in Foshan's Nanhai District. It opened on 23 August 2024, and is the northern terminus of the line. It is also the northernmost station of Foshan Metro.

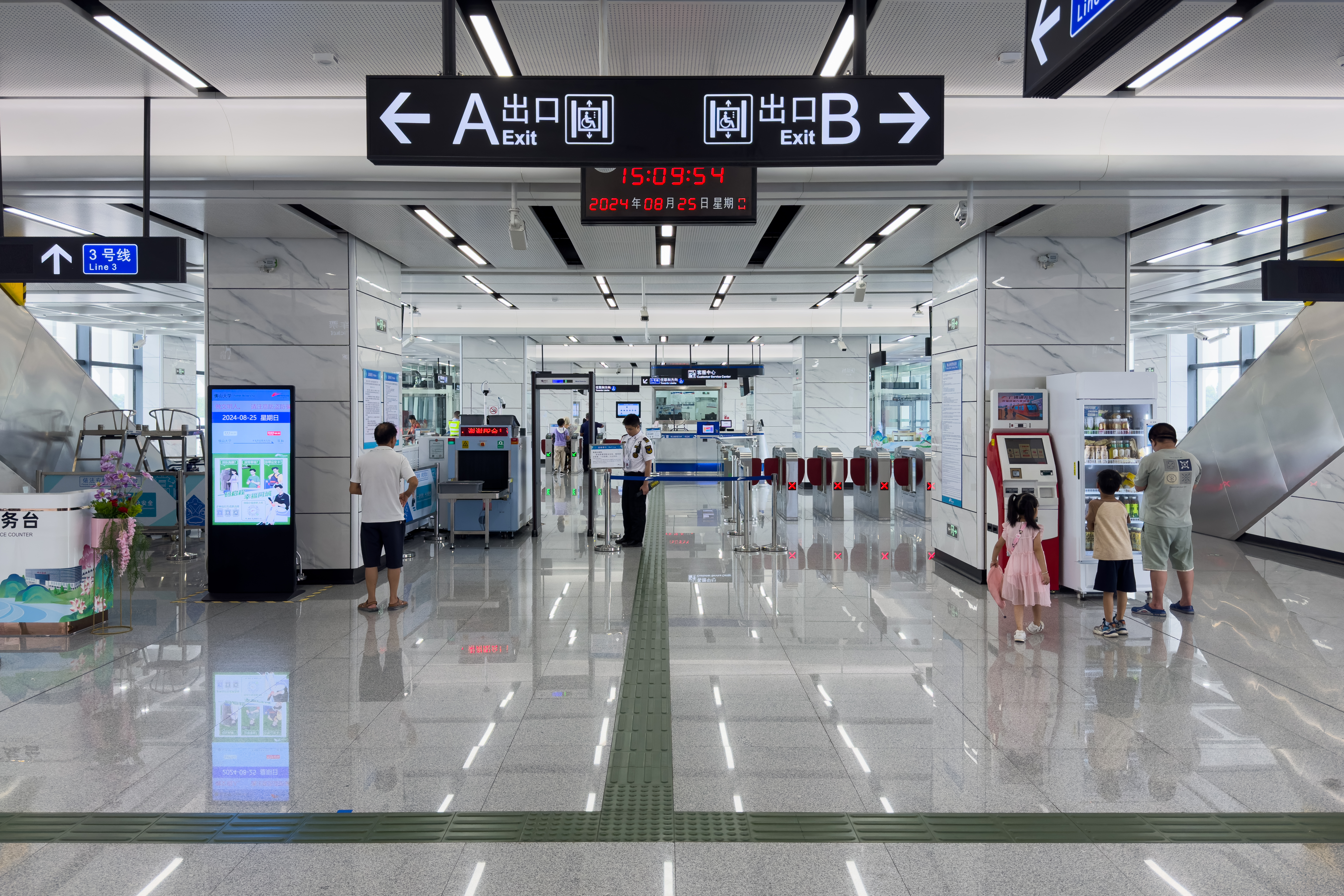
Concourse

== Station layout ==
The station has 2 side platforms above Jinhong Road. There is a crossover on the east side of the station for train turnback, and a single crossover line on the west side.

F3; Platforms	Side platform, doors will open on the right for alighting passengers only
F3; Platforms	Platform 2	3 termination platform
F3; Platforms	Platform 1	3 towards Shunde College Railway Station (Nanhai University Town)
F3; Platforms	Side platform, doors will open on the right for boarding passengers only
F2; Concourse	Lobby	Ticket Machines, Customer Service, Police Station, Security Facilities
G	-	Exits A & B

=== Entrances/exits ===
The station has 2 points of entry/exit, lettered A and B, located on the north and south sides of Jinhong Road. Both exits are equipped with elevators.

- A: Jinhong Road
- B: Jinhong Road, Foshan University
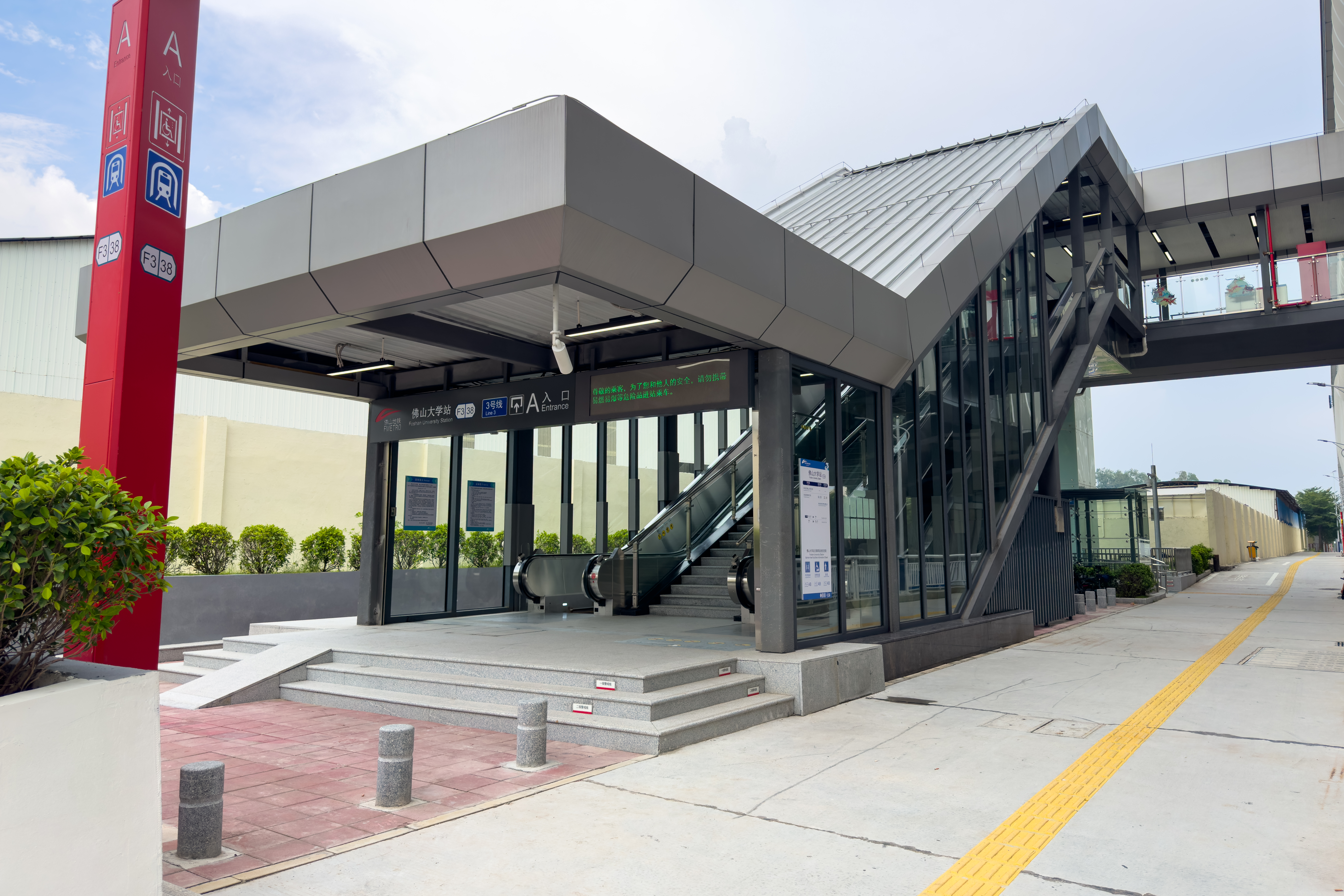
Entrance A

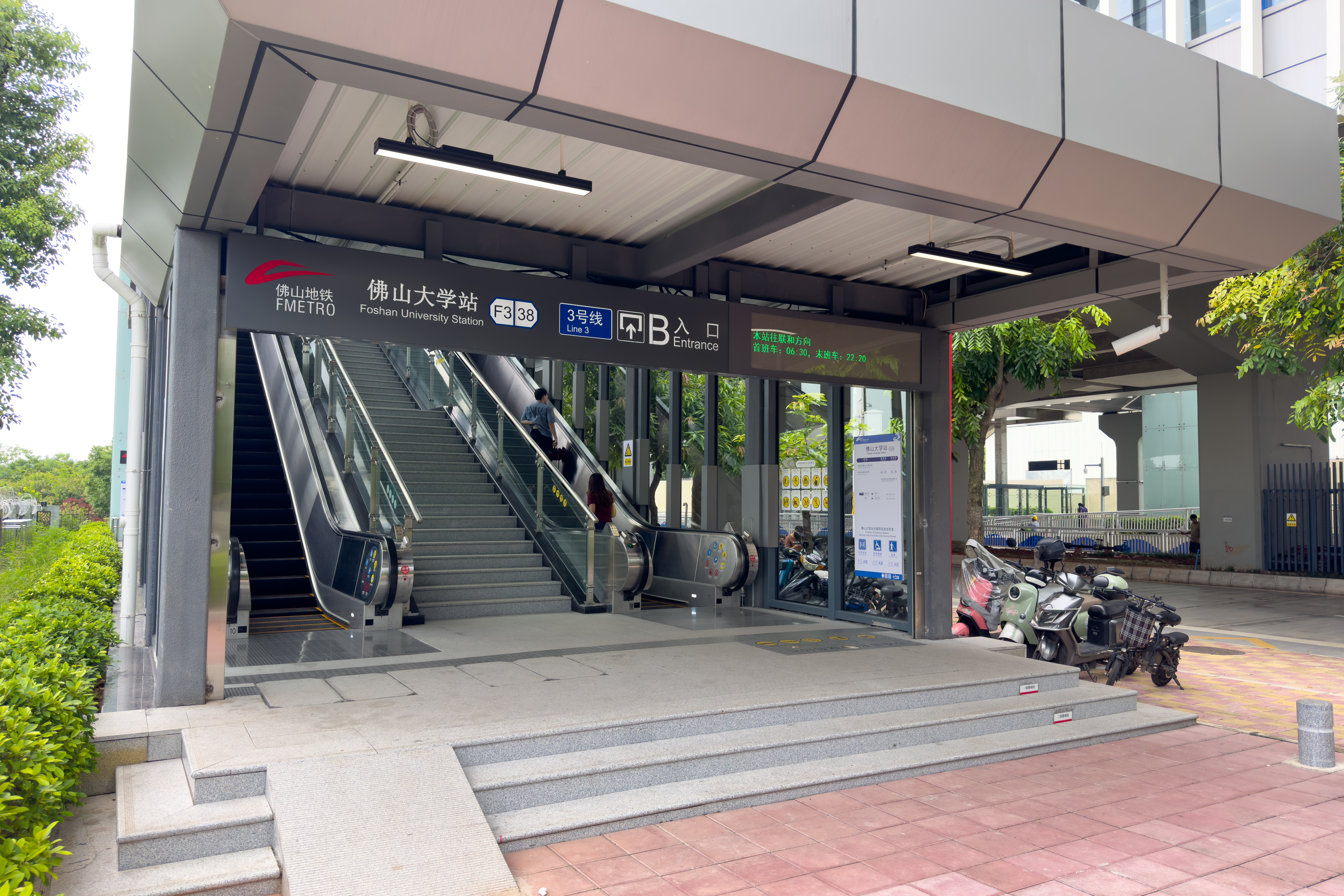
Entrance B

== History ==
When Line 3 was approved in 2012, this station was not included. In 2015, the planning of Line 3 was changed, and the line was extended from Shishan station (now Bo'ai Zhonglu) to this station. It would be called University of Science and Technology station, named after the Science and Technology campus of Foshan University nearby. The relevant adjustment plan was approved by the Guangdong Provincial Development and Reform Commission on 28 March 2019. In 2022 the station name was renamed to Foshan University of Science and Technology Xianxi Campus station. Later, due to the approval of the university to change its name to Foshan University in May 2024, the station was renamed Foshan University Xianxi Campus station. It was later renamed again to Foshan University station.

The construction of this station officially started in May 2019, and the main structure topped out on 25 October 2020. On 9 April 2023, the curtain wall of the façade of this station was successfully completed.

The station opened on 23 August 2024 as part of the section from "Lianhe to Foshan University". (Note: Prior to opening, it was known as part of the 'rear section' or 'section under construction')
