= Jiangmen East railway station =

Railway station in Jiangmen, China

Coordinates: 22.5611°N 113.1044°E

Jiangmen East 江门东
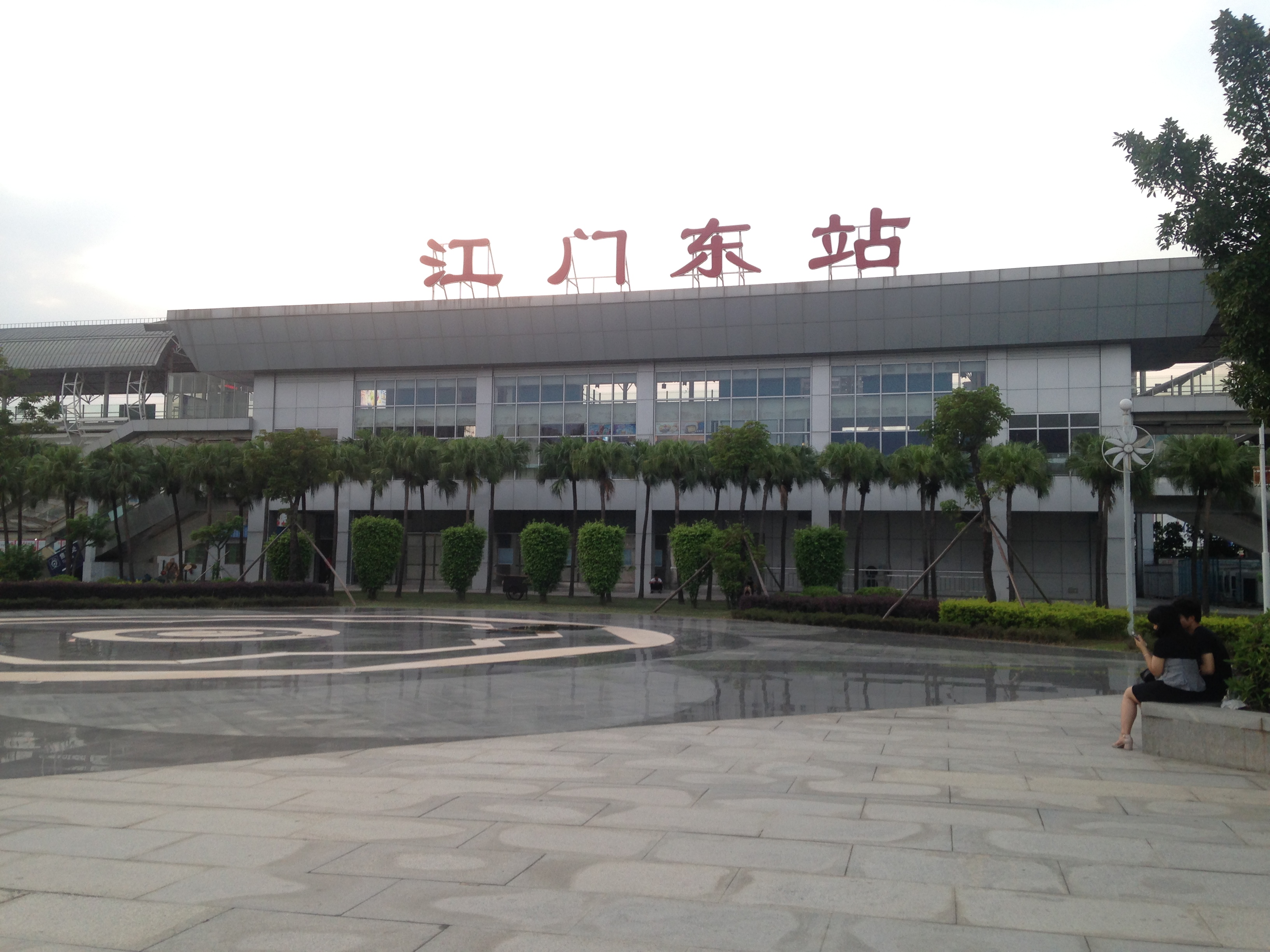
- Jiangmen East Station in 2018

General information
- Location: Jianghai District, Jiangmen, Guangdong; China
- Line: Guangzhou-Zhuhai intercity railway
Location

Jiangmen East railway station (Chinese: 江门东站), formerly Jiangmen railway station (Chinese: 江门站), is an elevated station on the Guangzhou–Zhuhai intercity railway Jiangmen Spur Line.

The station is located at the junction of Wuyi Road (Chinese: 五邑路) and Donghai Road (Chinese: 東海路) in the Jianghai District of Jiangmen City, Guangdong Province, China, near the Jiangmen National-Level High-Tech Industry Development Zone and the Jianghai District Government and Jianghai First Secondary School. It started operations on 7 January 2011. Jiangmen station was renamed Jiangmen East station in English and Chinese on 10 March 2017. A former freight-only station was renamed Jiangmen railway station and opened to passenger services on 15 November 2020.

Preceding station	China Railway High-speed	Following station
Guzhen towards Xiaolan	Guangzhou–Zhuhai intercity railway Jiangmen branch	Xinhui towards Jiangmen
