= Liyue =

Liyue may refer to:

- Liyue (Genshin Impact) (璃月), a fictional nation in the video game Genshin Impact.
- Liyue Railway Station in Guangdong, China

== People with the given name ==
- Zhang Liyue, Chinese competitor in the 2002 Asian Taekwondo Championships
- Zhu Liyue, a character in The Legend of Crazy Monk

== See also ==
- Li Yue (李跃), Chinese businessman
- Li Yue (canoeist) (李悦, born 1993), Chinese canoeist
- Liyue Tan, a maritime feature in the Spratly Islands
