= Shunde railway station =

Railway station in Foshan, China

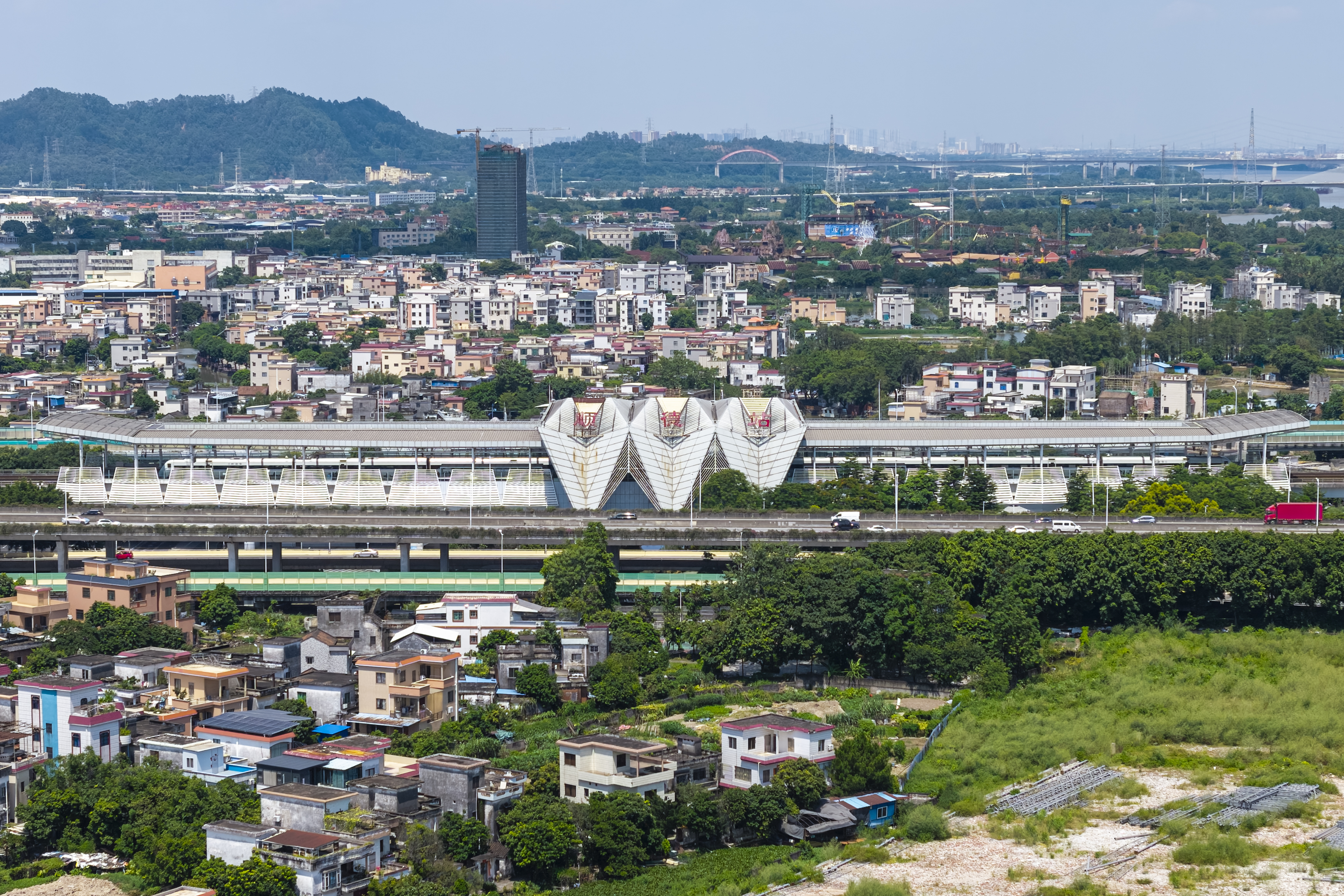
Exterior

Shunde railway station (Chinese: 顺德站) is an elevated station of Guangzhou-Zhuhai Intercity Railway. The station is located at the east of Bigui Lu (Chinese: 碧桂路) and the west of Longzhou Lu (Chinese: 龙洲路) across Sanchongzhou Channel (Chinese: 三涌洲水道) in Daliang, Shunde District, Foshan, Guangdong, China, which is the center of Shunde District. It started operations on 7 January 2011.

| Preceding station | Pearl River Delta Metropolitan Region Intercity Railway | Following station |
|---|---|---|
| Beijiao towards Guangzhou South | Guangzhou–Zhuhai intercity railway | Shunde College towards Zhuhai |
