= Ronggui railway station =

Railway station in Foshan, China

Coordinates: 22.7518°N 113.3097°E

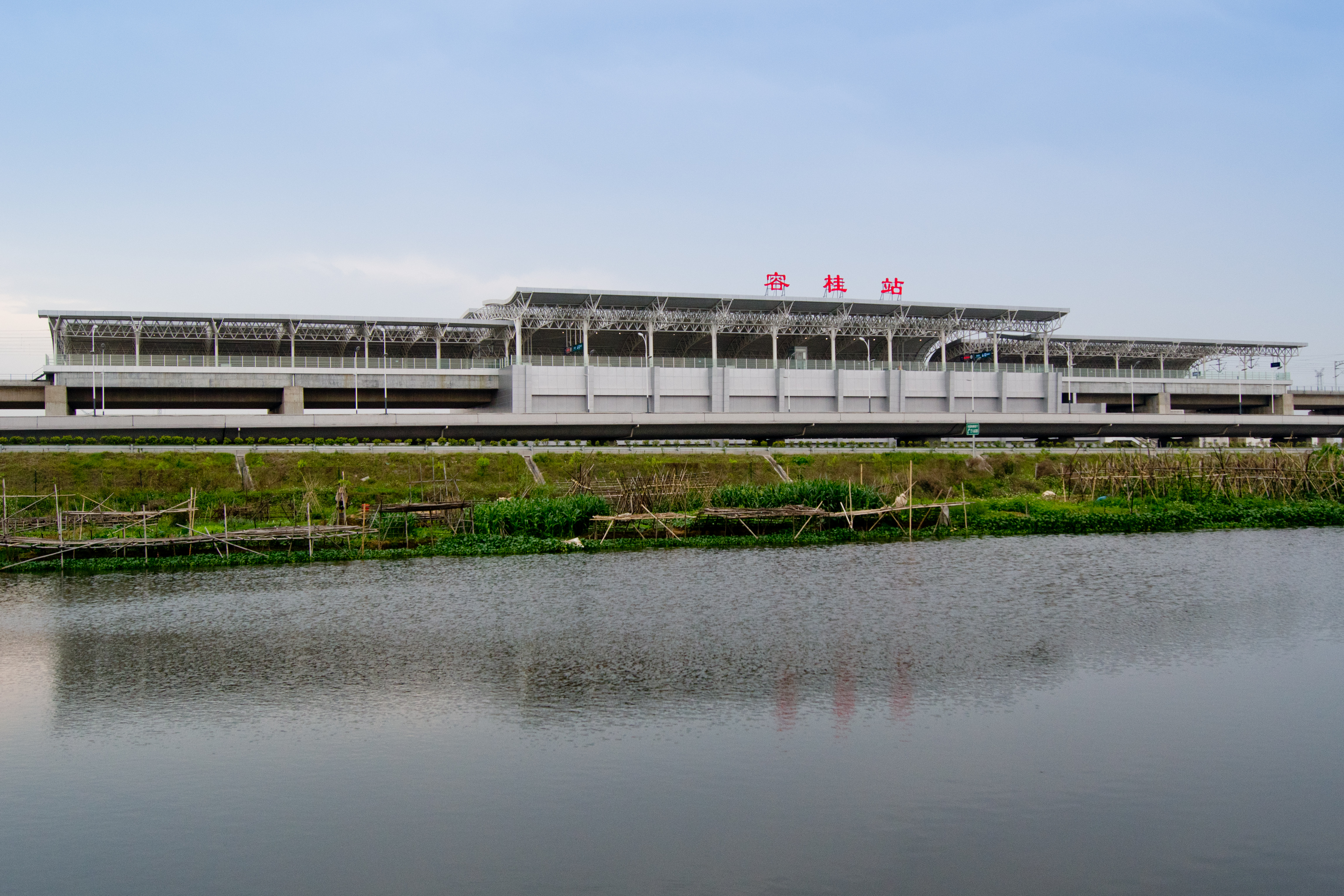
Ronggui railway station

Ronggui railway station (Chinese: 容桂站) is an elevated station on the Guangzhou-Zhuhai Intercity Railway.

The station is in Ronggui Subdistrict in the Shunde District of Foshan City, Guangdong Province, China. It is the last station in Shunde for trains travelling in the direction of Zhongshan. To the station's east is the Shunde High-tech Zone (Chinese: 顺德高新科技园) Zone B, to the south Guizhou Avenue (Chinese: 桂洲大道), to the north Xinyou Road (Chinese: 新有路) and to the west Baogong Logistics Park (Chinese: 宝供物流园). Ronggui Station started operations on 7 January 2011.

Preceding station	Pearl River Delta Metropolitan Region Intercity Railway	Following station
Shunde Polytechnic towards Guangzhou South	Guangzhou–Zhuhai intercity railway	Nantou towards Zhuhai
