= Shunde College Railway Station =

Shunde College Railway Station may refers to:

- Shundexueyuan railway station, station of Guangzhou-Zhuhai intercity railway.
- Shunde College Railway Station (Foshan Metro), station of Foshan Metro line 3.
