= Zhongshan railway station =

Railway station in Zhongshan, China

Zhongshan 中山
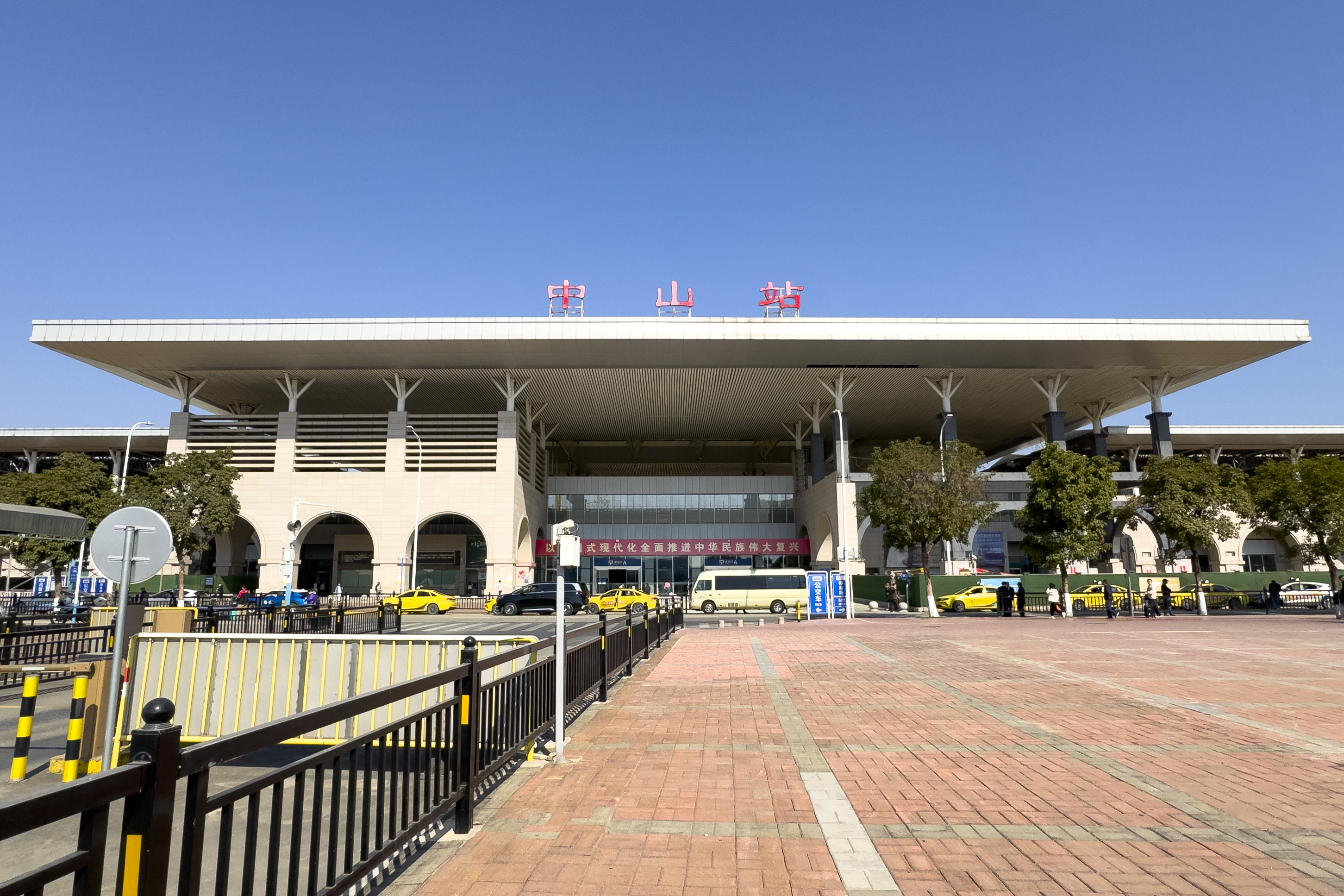

General information
- Other names: Chungshan
- Location: Shiji Dadao, Zhongshan Torch District, Zhongshan, Guangdong; China
- Coordinates: 22°32′48.228″N 113°25′41.4228″E
- Owner: Guangdong Guangzhu Intercity Rail Transit
- Operator: CR Guangzhou
- Line: Guangzhou–Zhuhai intercity railway
- Platforms: 2 (side platforms)
- Connections: Bus routes 02, 05, 08, 18, 61, 68, 90

Construction
- Structure type: Elevated

Other information
- Station code: ZSQ

History
- Opened: 7 January 2011

Services
Preceding station	Pearl River Delta Metropolitan Region Intercity Railway	Following station
Zhongshan North towards Guangzhou South	Guangzhou–Zhuhai intercity railway	Nanlang towards Zhuhai

Future services
Preceding station	Guangzhou Metro	Following station
Huojuxi towards Huachengjie	Line 18	Qijiangdao towards Xingzhong
Location

Zhongshan railway station (Chinese: 中山站) is an elevated station of Guangzhou–Zhuhai intercity railway.

The station is located at Simen Village (泗门村), Zhongshan Torch Hi-tech Industrial Development Zone, Zhongshan, Guangdong, China. It started operations on 7 January 2011.
