= Zhongshan North railway station =

Railway station in Zhongshan, China

Coordinates: 22.5574°N 113.3829°E

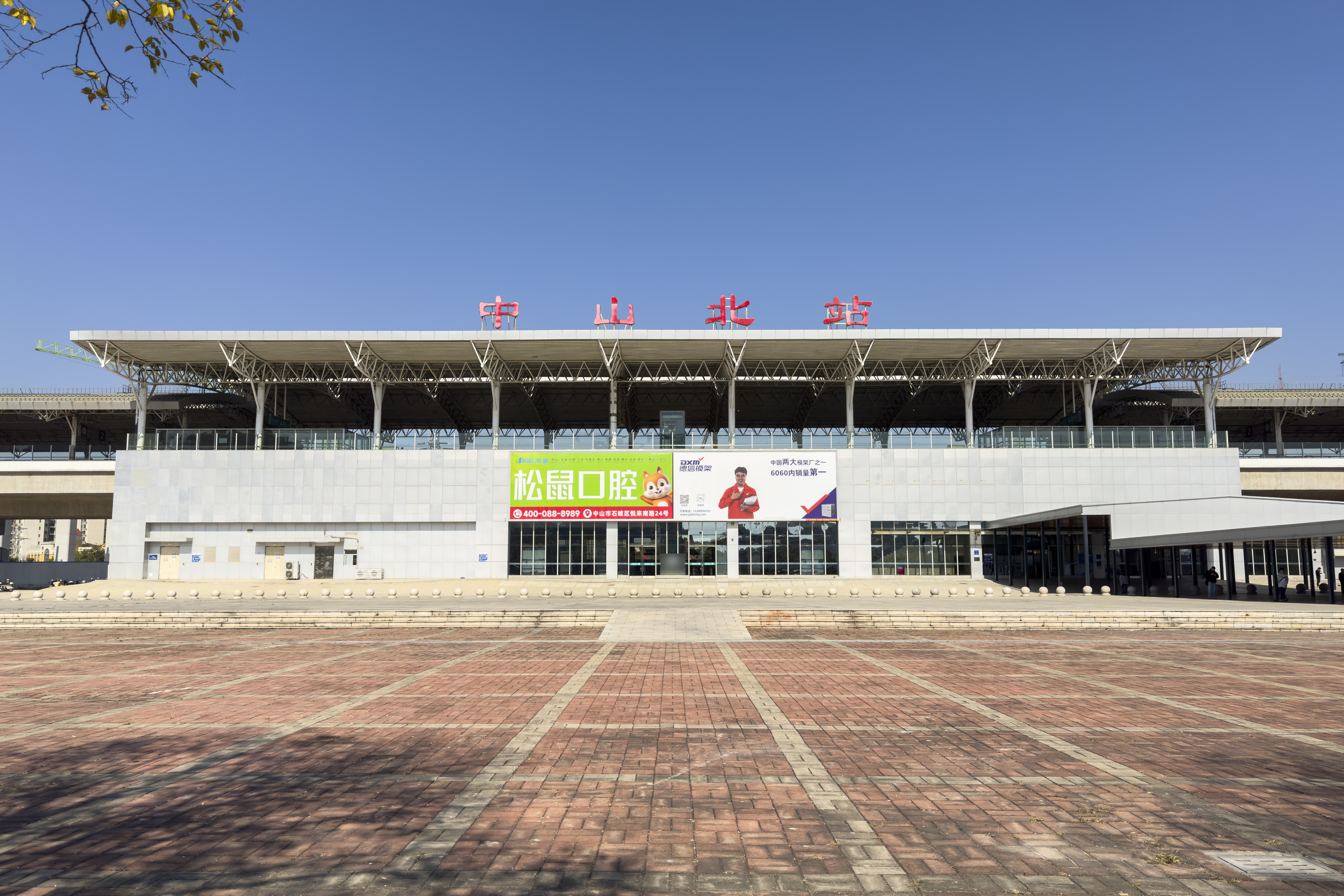
Zhongshan North station

Zhongshan North railway station (Chinese: 中山北站; pinyin: Zhōngshānběi zhàn), formerly Shiqi railway station (Chinese: 石岐站) during planning, is an elevated station on the Guangzhou–Zhuhai intercity railway.

The station is located on Minke West Road (民科西路), Shiqi Subdistrict, Zhongshan, Guangdong Province, southern China. It started operations on 7 January 2011. It is the station nearest to the city centre of Zhongshan.

The station will be a stop on the under construction Shenzhen–Zhanjiang high-speed railway.

Preceding station	Pearl River Delta Metropolitan Region Intercity Railway	Following station
Xiaolan towards Guangzhou South	Guangzhou–Zhuhai intercity railway	Zhongshan towards Zhuhai

Preceding station	Pearl River Delta Metropolitan Region Intercity Railway	Following station
Dongsheng towards Guangzhou South	Guangzhou–Zhuhai intercity railway Suspended 2020	Zhongshan towards Zhuhai
