= Nantou railway station =

Railway station in Guangdong, China

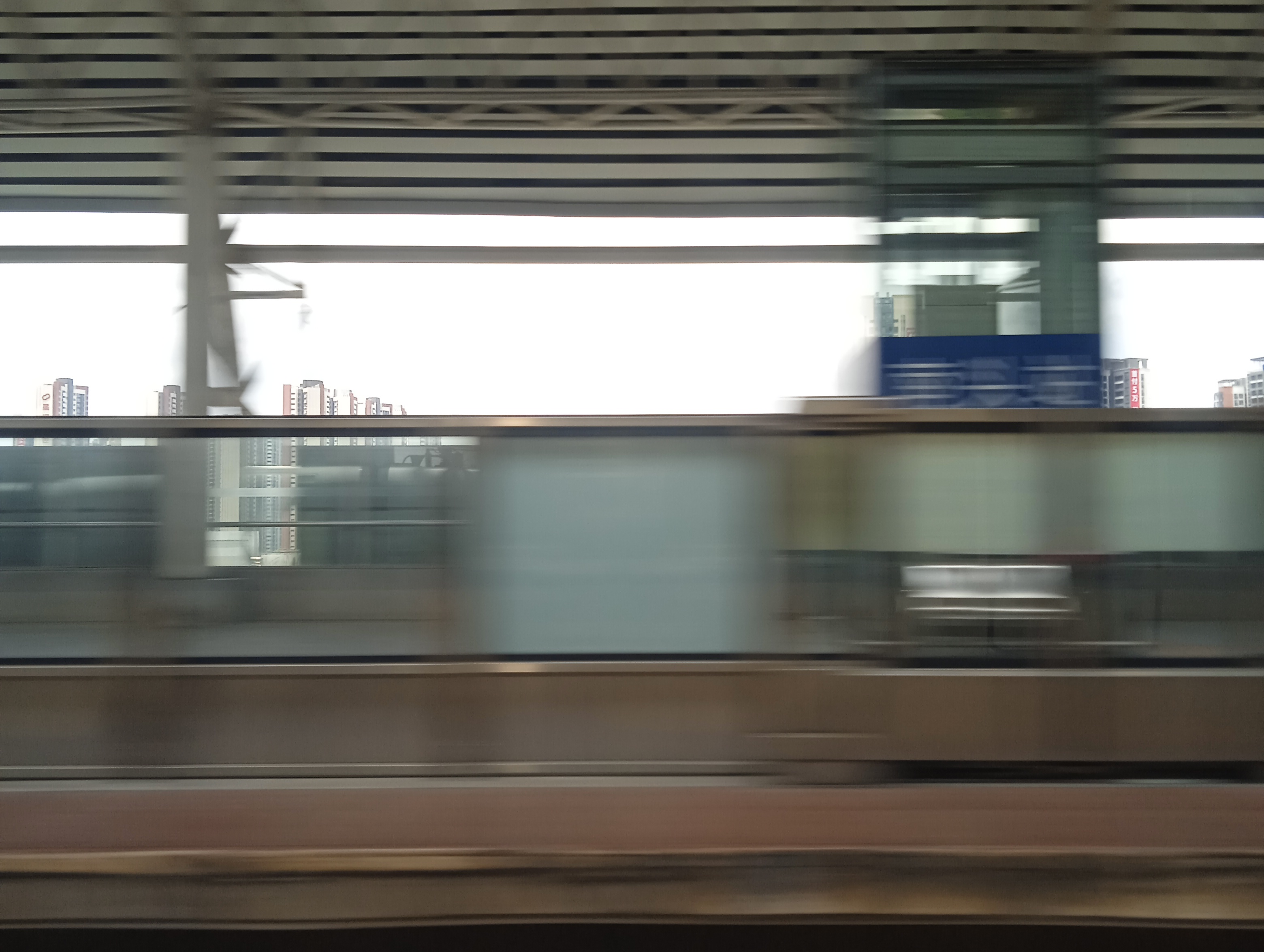
Nantou railway station

Nantou railway station (Chinese: 南头站) is an elevated station of Guangzhou-Zhuhai Intercity Railway.

The station is located at Nantou Dadao (Chinese: 南头大道), Nantou Town, Zhongshan, Guangdong, China. It is the first station in Zhongshan for the rail in Zhuhai direction. It is called to be the "Main Gate of Zhongshan". It started operations on 7 January 2011.

Preceding station	Pearl River Delta Metropolitan Region Intercity Railway	Following station
Ronggui towards Guangzhou South	Guangzhou–Zhuhai intercity railway	Xiaolan towards Zhuhai
