= Xinhui railway station =

Railway station in Jiangmen, China

Coordinates: 22°31′14″N 113°03′56″E

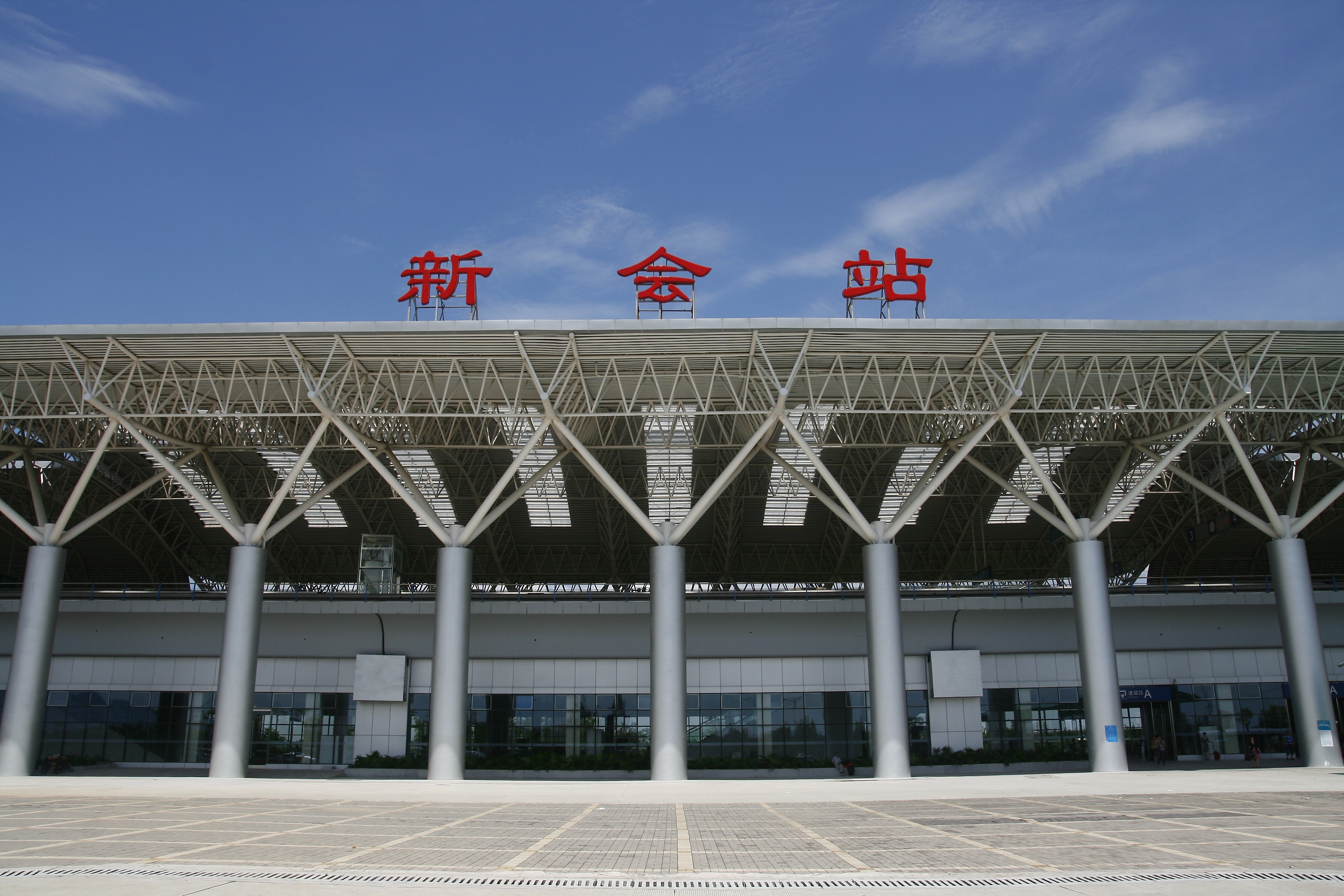
Xinhui railway station

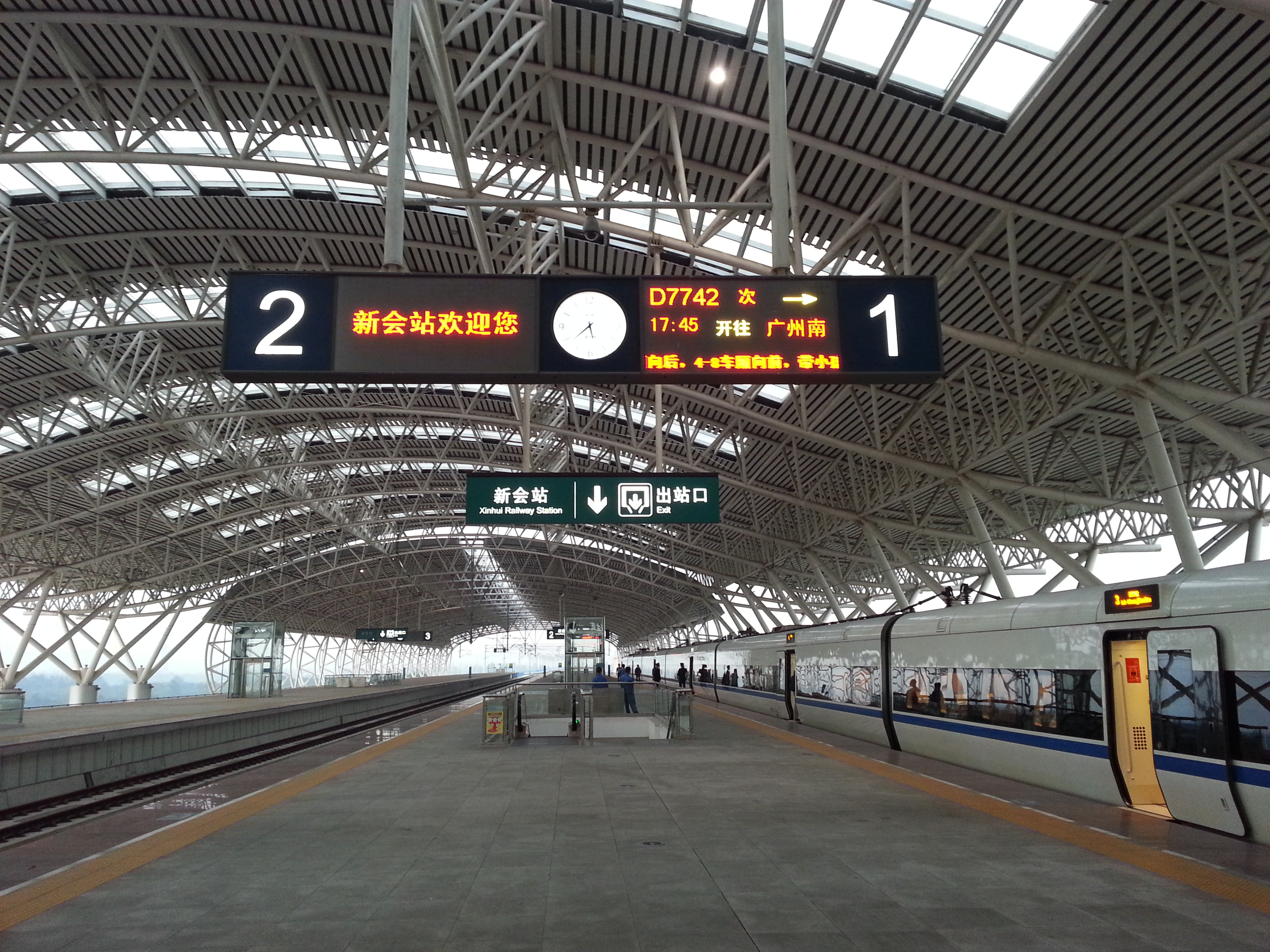
On the platform

Xinhui railway station (Chinese: 新会站) is an elevated station of Guangzhou–Zhuhai intercity railway Jiangmen Spur Line. It started operation on 7 January 2011.

The station is located near Dongjia Village (Chinese: 東甲村) in Huicheng Street (Chinese: 会城街道), Xinhui District, Jiangmen, Guangdong, China. Since it is far away from the current bus terminus in Huicheng, a new bus terminus will be built to serve the passengers. The station started operations in 2011.

Xinhui Station was formerly called Jiangmen West Station (Chinese: 江门西站) when planning. However, the station name was strongly criticized by Xinhui citizens that it degraded the position of Xinhui. Therefore, the authorities finally renamed the station to Xinhui Station.

== Station Structure ==
Xinhui railway station is the biggest one in Xinhui-Jianghai branch because of the requirement of storage and shunting. With an island platform and four station tracks, the station house covers an area of 6,023 square kilometers. The central station has its area of 100,784 square kilometers, while the platform awning has a projective covering area of 23,936 square kilometers.

== Park ==
The park covers an area of 15,067 square meters. It includes parking for taxis, tourist coaches and private motor vehicles; bus bays, and green square. Among them, the area for buses and taxis is 6,875 square meters, which contains temporary parking for taxis and tourist coaches, a corridor for passengers, and bus bays for three lines. Private motor vehicles parking covers an area of 6,845 square meters, which can hold approximately 119 cars and 135 motorcycles.

Preceding station	China Railway High-speed	Following station
Jiangmen East towards Xiaolan	Guangzhou–Zhuhai intercity railway Jiangmen branch	Jiangmen Terminus
