= Zhuhai North railway station =

Railway station in Zhuhai, China

Zhuhai North 珠海北
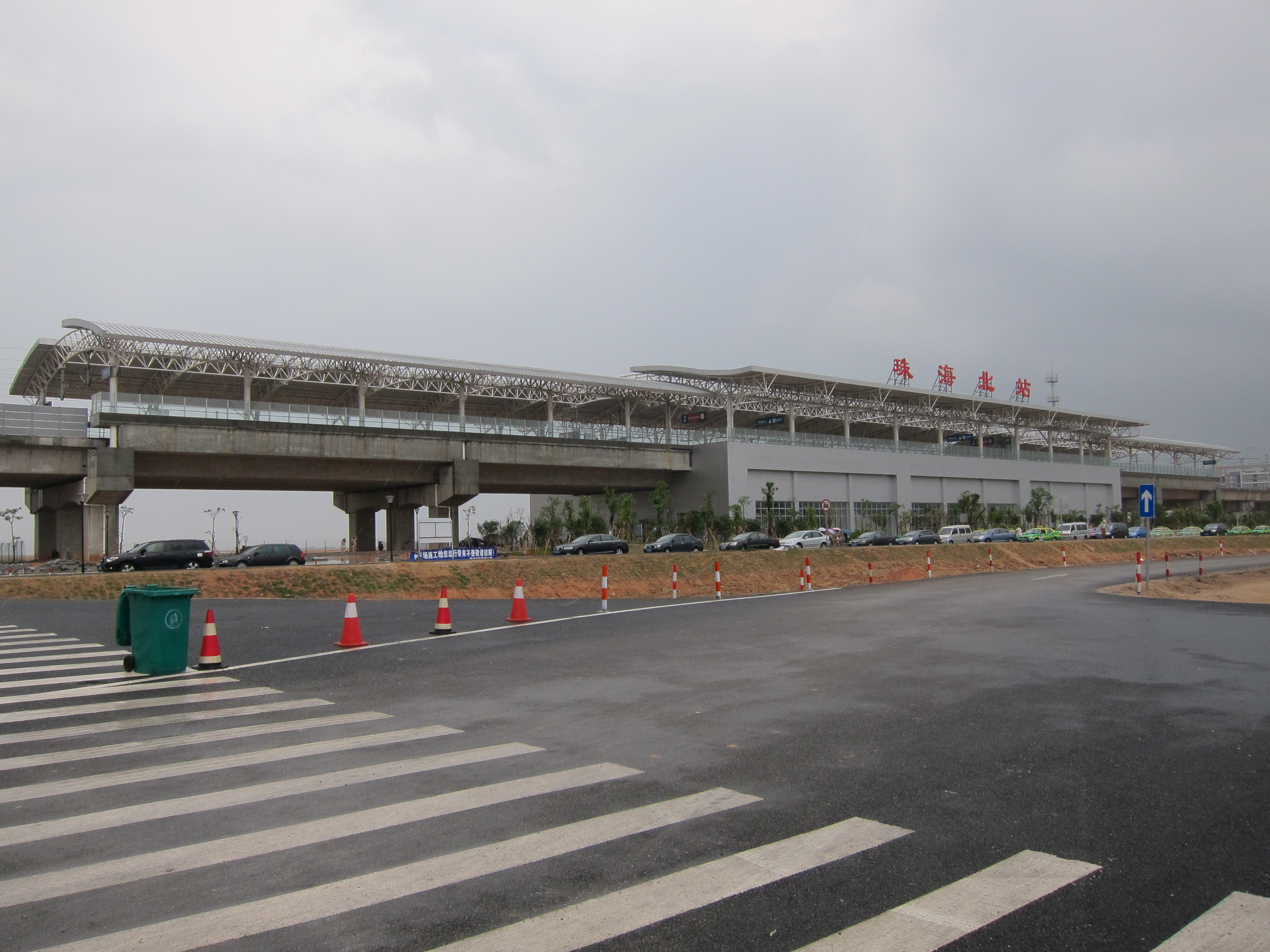

General information
- Other names: Jinding railway station (Chinese: 金鼎站; pinyin: Jīndǐng zhàn) (construction name)
- Location: Jinfeng North Road, Xiangzhou District, Zhuhai, Guangdong; China
- Coordinates: 22.4010°N 113.55258°E
- Owner: Guangdong Guangzhu Intercity Rail Transit
- Operator: CR Guangzhou
- Line: Guangzhou–Zhuhai intercity railway
- Platforms: 2 (side platforms)
- Connections: Bus routes 3A, 65, 72A, K1

Construction
- Structure type: Elevated

Other information
- Station code: ZIQ

History
- Opened: 7 January 2011

Services
Preceding station	Pearl River Delta Metropolitan Region Intercity Railway	Following station
Nanlang towards Guangzhou South	Guangzhou–Zhuhai intercity railway	Tangjiawan towards Zhuhai
Location

Zhuhai North (Zhuhaibei) railway station (Chinese: 珠海北站; pinyin: Zhūhǎi Běi Zhàn), is an elevated station on the Guangzhou–Zhuhai intercity railway. It is in the Zhuhai National Hi-Tech Industrial Development District in Xiangzhou District, Zhuhai, Guangdong Province, China.

The station started operations on 7 January 2011. From its opening until 31 December 2012, it was the only station open in Zhuhai and served as the temporary south terminus of the Guangzhu ICR until the remaining stations in Zhuhai opened; the line was extended to the permanent southern terminus at the Zhuhai railway station in downtown Zhuhai.

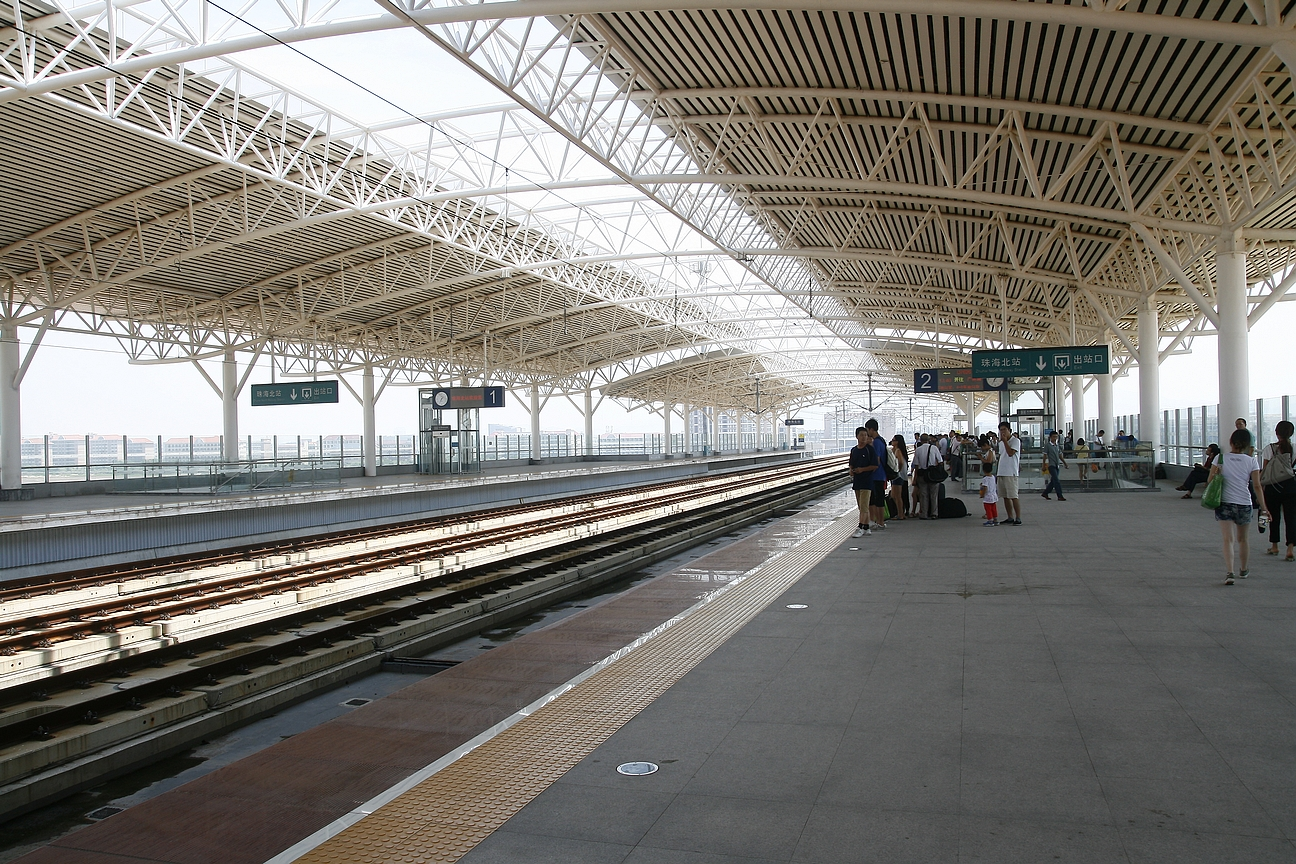
Zhuhai North railway station Platform

== Station layout ==
L2; Platforms	Side platform, doors will open on the left
L2; Platforms	Platform 1	Guangzhu towards Zhuhai (Tangjiawan)
L2; Platforms	Platform 2	Guangzhu towards Guangzhou South (Nanlang)
L2; Platforms	Side platform, doors will open on the left
G Concourse	Lobby/Exit	Ticket Booths, Departure Hall
