= Guzhen railway station =

Railway station in Zhongshan, Guangdong, China

Guzhen Railway Station 古镇站
- Guzhen Railway Station

General information
- Location: Mid. Dong'an Road and Qijiang Road Junction, Guzhen Town, Zhongshan, Guangdong, People's republic of China
- Coordinates: 22°36′13″N 113°12′13″E
- Operator: CR Guangzhou
- Line: Guangzhou–Zhuhai intercity railway
- Platforms: 2 Side Platforms
- Tracks: 2

Construction
- Structure type: Elevated

Other information
- Station code: TMIS code: 66400 Telegraph code: GNQ Pinyin code: GZH

Services
Preceding station	China Railway High-speed	Following station
Xiaolan Terminus	Guangzhou–Zhuhai intercity railway Jiangmen branch	Jianghai towards Jiangmen
Location

Guzhen railway station (Chinese: 古镇站) is an elevated station of Guangzhou–Zhuhai intercity railway Jiangmen Brunch Line.

The station is located at the intersection of Qijiang Road (Chinese: 岐江路) and Mid. Dong'an Road (Chinese: 东岸中路), Guzhen Town, Zhongshan, Guangdong, China. It started operation on 7 January 2011.

== Station Layout ==
Guzhen Station is an elevated 2 level side-platform station.

Level 2

Platforms

Side Platform
Platform 2
Towards Guangzhou South (Xiaolan)
Platform 1
Towards Jiangmen (Jianghai)
Side Platform
Ground Level
Entrances and exits
Station entrances and exits, equipment rooms

Preceding station	China Railway High-speed	Following station
Xiaolan Terminus	Guangzhou–Zhuhai intercity railway Jiangmen branch	Jianghai towards Jiangmen
