= Guangzhou–Zhuhai intercity railway =

Railway line in People's Republic of China

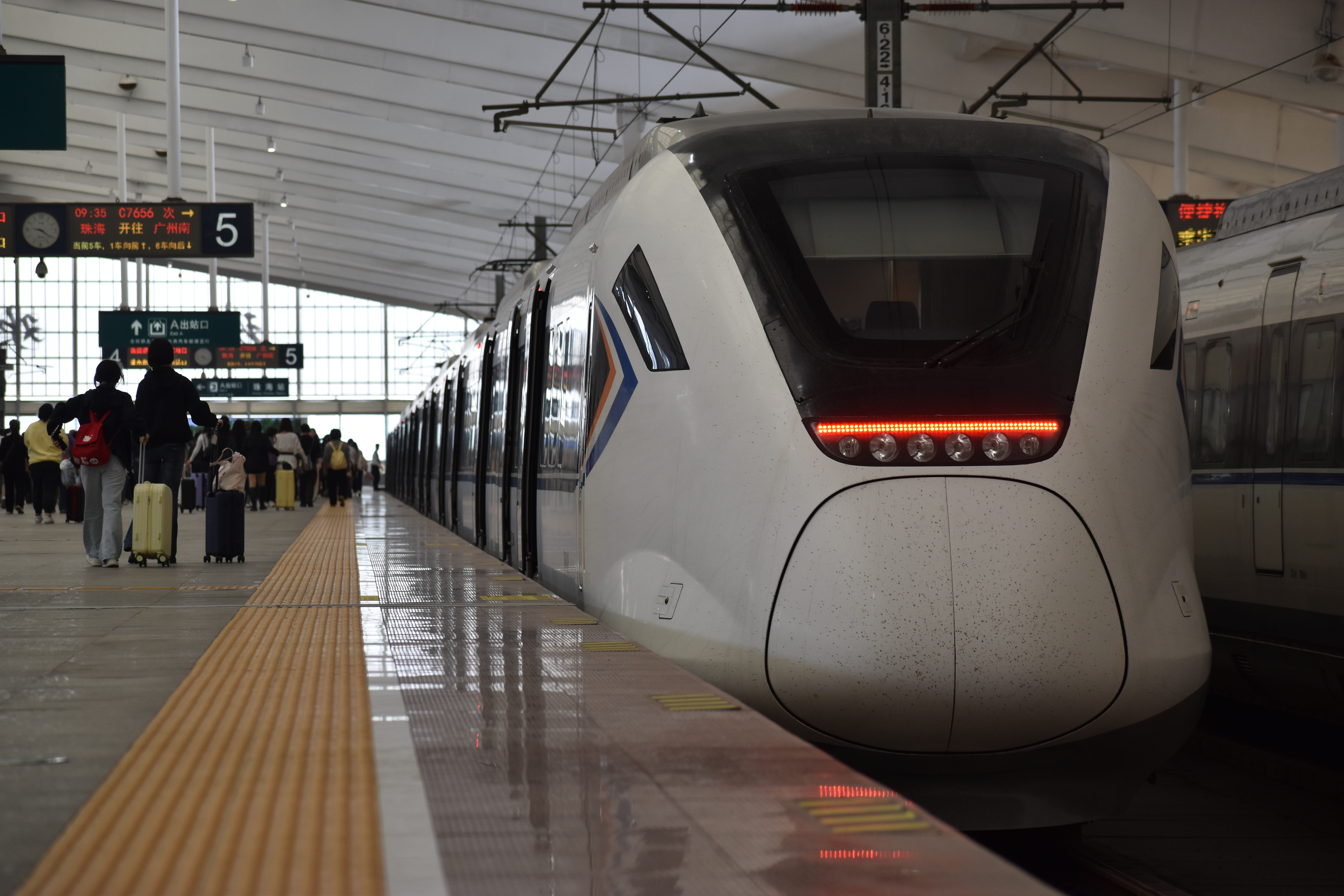
- Guangzhu intercity railway train at Zhuhai Railway Station

Overview
- Other name: Guangzhu intercity railway
- Native name: 广珠城际铁路
- Status: Operational
- Owner: Guangdong Guangzhu Intercity Rail Transit Co., Ltd.
- Locale: Guangdong province
- Termini: Guangzhou South; Zhuhai / Jiangmen
- Stations: 22

Service
- Type: Higher-speed rail Inter-city rail
- System: Pearl River Delta Metropolitan Region intercity railway; China Railway High-speed
- Services: 2
- Operator: CR Guangzhou
- Daily ridership: 342,000

History
- Commenced: 8 December 2005 (20 years ago)
- Opened: 7 January 2011 (15 years ago)

Technical
- Line length: 143.03 km (88.87 miles) (Main line); 187 km (116 miles) (Branch line)
- Number of tracks: Double-track
- Character: Elevated
- Track gauge: 1,435 mm (4 ft 8 1/2 in) standard gauge
- Electrification: 25 kV 50 Hz AC (Overhead line)
- Operating speed: 200 km/h (120 mph) (Design); 250 km/h (160 mph) (Maximum); 120 km/h (75 mph) (Zhuhai - Zhuhai Airport)

Chinese name
- Simplified Chinese: 广珠城际铁路
- Traditional Chinese: 廣珠城際鐵路
Transcriptions
Standard Mandarin
- Hanyu Pinyin: guǎngzhū chéngjì tiělù
Yue: Cantonese
- Yale Romanization: gwóng jyū sìhng jai tit louh
- Jyutping: gwong^{2} zyu^{1} sing^{4} zai^{3} tit^{3} lou^{6}
Route map
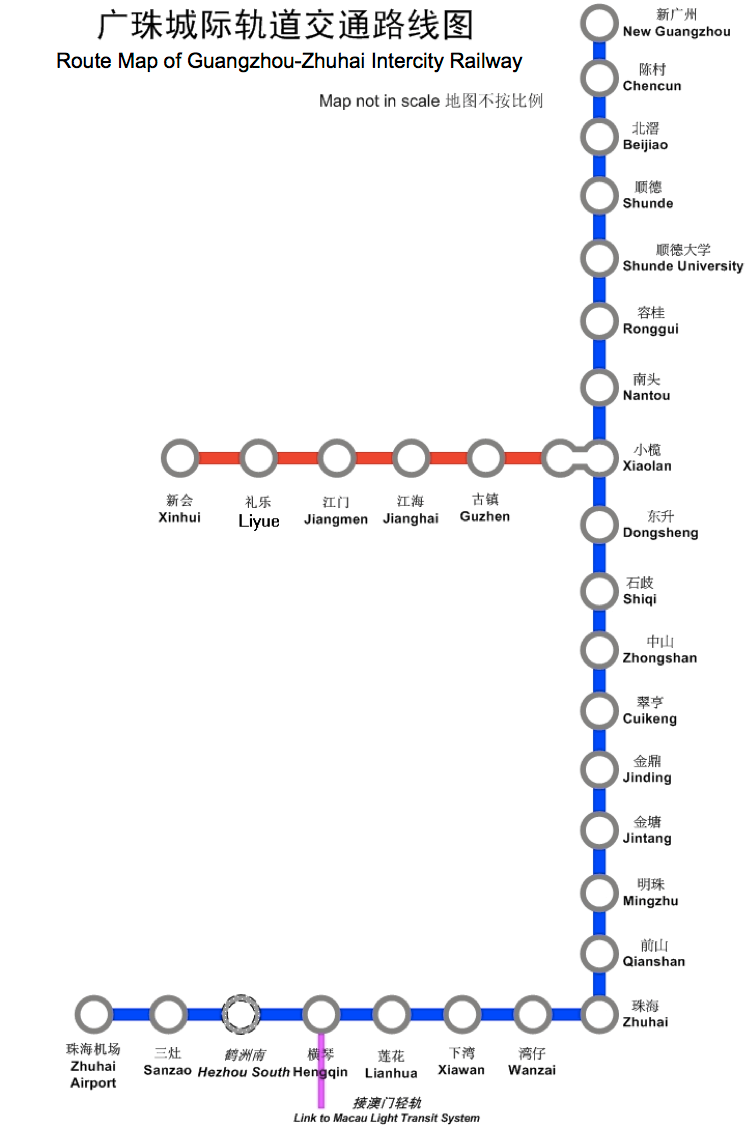

Guangzhou–Zhuhai intercity railway or Guangzhu intercity railway (simplified Chinese: 广珠城际铁路; traditional Chinese: 廣珠城際鐵路; pinyin: guǎngzhū chéngjì tiělù) is a dedicated, grade-separated regional railway linking Guangzhou South railway station in Panyu, Guangzhou, Jiangmen railway station in Xinhui, Jiangmen, and Zhuhai Jinwan Airport in Zhuhai, via Shunde, Zhongshan and Jiangmen, in Guangdong province. It is the first line completed in the Pearl River Delta Metropolitan Region intercity railway network. It is operated by China Railway Guangzhou Group.

== Overview ==
The railway began partial operation in January 2011. It will be divided into three parts with a total of 27 stations. Its main line between Guangzhou and Zhuhai City, via Shunde and Zhongshan, is 117 km (73 mi) long, with 17 stations and a maximum speed of 200 km/h (124 mph). The planned extension from Zhuhai City to Zhuhai Airport is 35.3 km (22 mi) long, with 7 stations and a maximum speed of 160 km/h (99 mph). Its spur line between Zhongshan and Jiangmen is 26 km (16 mi) long, with 6 stations and a maximum speed of 200 km/h (124 mph).

When fully completed, passengers traveling on the main line between Zhuhai and Guangzhou South will have a choice between a 46-minute non-stop and a 76-minute, 140 km/h all-stop service. The non-stop service is offered between Zhuhai and Guangzhou South only, and travel between Zhuhai (Gongbei) and Zhuhai Airport will be cut down to 25 minutes. It currently takes 50 minutes to travel by auto from Gongbei, Zhuhai to Zhuhai Airport, and 1 hour 30 minutes from Gongbei, Zhuhai to Panyu, Guangzhou.

The construction of the railway began in 2005 and it was to be completed by 2010 to cope with the opening of the Guangzhou Asian Games, but missed this deadline.

After the opening of the Guangzhu Line, Zhongshan will open nine new bus lines to support operations, according to Zhongshan Public Transportation Corporation. By the end of 2010, more than 100 shuttle buses will be put into operation. Initially with trains operating about every 30 minutes, services have gradually been increased to cope with rising passenger numbers. Do to high demand for local stopping services, the amount of express services between Jiangmen and Zhuhai to Guangzhou is limited. To remedy this, a parallel regional railway, the Guangfojiangzhu ICR, running between Zhuhai Jinwan Airport and Guangzhou via Jiangmen and Foshan's Nanhai District is proposed to be constructed.

== Name confusion ==
Due to the confusing usage of the Chinese term "Qinggui" (轻轨), the name could refer to a Light Rail line or an elevated Mass Rapid Transit line in the original name of this railway, this line was firstly conceived as a Mass Rapid Transit line. As later pointed out by the local media Nanfang Daily, however, this is a mainline Chinese railway, run by the national Chinese Ministry of Railway (instead of a local agency or authority), using mainline rolling stock CRH1, and with respective identifier for each train, that is very unlikely to be a Mass Rapid Transit line. The old term "Guangzhu Qinggui" (广珠轻轨, Guangzhu Mass Rapid Transit) was discarded in favor of "Guangzhu Chengji Tielu" (广珠城际铁路, Guangzhu intercity railway) in news media.

== History ==
In April 2004, the ongoing Guangzhou–Zhuhai intercity railway traffic's preliminary feasibility study was finished, resulting in a proposed railway alignments, technical standards, and project design details. Soon afterwards, the railway project was included on the list of major projects for 2005 in Zhuhai. At the first Pearl River Delta Regional Economic and Trade Cooperation Fair on July 14, 2004, the Ministry of Railways and Guangdong's provincial government signed an agreement, forming the Guangdong Pearl River Delta Intercity Rail Company and giving each party a 50 percent share in the joint venture. Thus, the Guangzhou–Zhuhai intercity railway was born, incorporating officially on July 29.

On March 16, 2005, China's State Council considered the adoption of the "Bohai Sea, Yangtze River Delta, and Pearl River Delta Intercity Railway Network Plan" during the May 2005 Guangzhou–Zhuhai intercity railway preliminary design review. The design of the Guangzhou-Zhuhai project was adjusted, and a single alignment was preliminarily determined. Substantial adjustments were made to the alignment south of Jiangmen, resulting in the current "Nanlang Alignment". The "Nanlang Alignment" runs from Cuiheng Village in Zhongshan to Zhuhai along the east side of Yangangwan Avenue, through the Fenghuangshan Tunnel, along Mingzhu Road, Gangchang Road, and Changsheng Road before reaching Zhuhai's Xiangzhou District.

On December 18, 2005, construction on the Guangzhou–Zhuhai intercity railway commenced. Construction of elevated lines in the form of aerial structures accounts for approximately 92.25% of the alignment, allowing for minimal changes in slope and grade that provides for a smooth train ride throughout the system.

On March 25, 2008, the preliminary feasibility study for the Zhuhai (Gongbei)—Zhuhai Airport extension line was released. The 35.3 kilometer westward extension from the original terminus at Zhuhai Station passes over several waterways on its way to Sanzao and Zhuhai Airport, including the Qianshan, Maliuzhou, Modaomen and Niwanmen waterways. Six additional stations will be built, including Wanzai, Xiawan, Lianhua, Hengqin, Sanzao, and Zhuhai Airport. A possible seventh station, Hezhou South Station, will be built in the future depending on the realization of local development. Hengqin Station and Sanzao Station are separated by 15.7 kilometers, of which includes 6.97 kilometers passing over Jinhai bridge, the greatest distance between two stations along this line. In addition, provisions for a future connection to the Macau Light Transit System will be made near Hengqin, possibly in the form of an underwater spur line linking to Macau Light Rapid Transit's Cotai line. Construction, which was scheduled to be completed in 2011, will effectively link cities in the Pearl River Delta with Macau by rail.

The railway line began operations between Guangzhou South and Zhuhai North (formerly named Jintang) Stations on January 7, 2011, while the extension of the line to Gongbei via the Fenghuang Shan Tunnel was postponed.

As of February 17, 2026, the current fare for a trip between Zhuhai North and Guangzhou South Railway Stations is as follows:

- RMB¥70 (RMB¥52.5 for Students) | First Class

- RMB¥55 (RMB¥51.25 for Students) | Second Class

- RMB¥55 | Standing Seat

As of September 23, 2025, select students with a specific "Train Discount" sticker has access to 4 single-trip discounts every academic year. This is a discount of up 25% off and is stackable with other coupons. These coupons will only apply to First Class, Second Class, and Sleeper Classes. These are limited to select Post-secondary institutions and/or specific faculty/students. There is also a discount of up to 50% for disabled military veterans, police, or firefighters with a valid mainland Chinese certificate for disabled veterans, disabled policemen, or disabled firefighters.

The journey time is 40-55 minutes depending on the specific train. Express buses are available to link Zhuhai North Station with Xiangzhou and Gongbei, while regular buses 3A & 65 serve local residents.

In November 2012, testing started on the last section of the railway, from Zhuhai North to Zhuhai Gongbei; it was expected to be opened for service on 1 January 2013.

== The airport extension ==
It was reported in November 2012 that the construction work on the line's extension from downtown Zhuhai to Zhuhai Jinwan Airport, via Hengqing Island, would start by the end of 2012. The extension is now known as the Zhuhai–Zhuhai Airport intercity railway. The phase 1 of the extension, from Zhuhai to Zhuhai Changlong started operation on 18 August 2020. At the Hengqin Railway Station, a connection is planned to the proposed Hengqin Extension Line of Macau Light Rail Transit. The phase 2 opened on 3 February 2024.

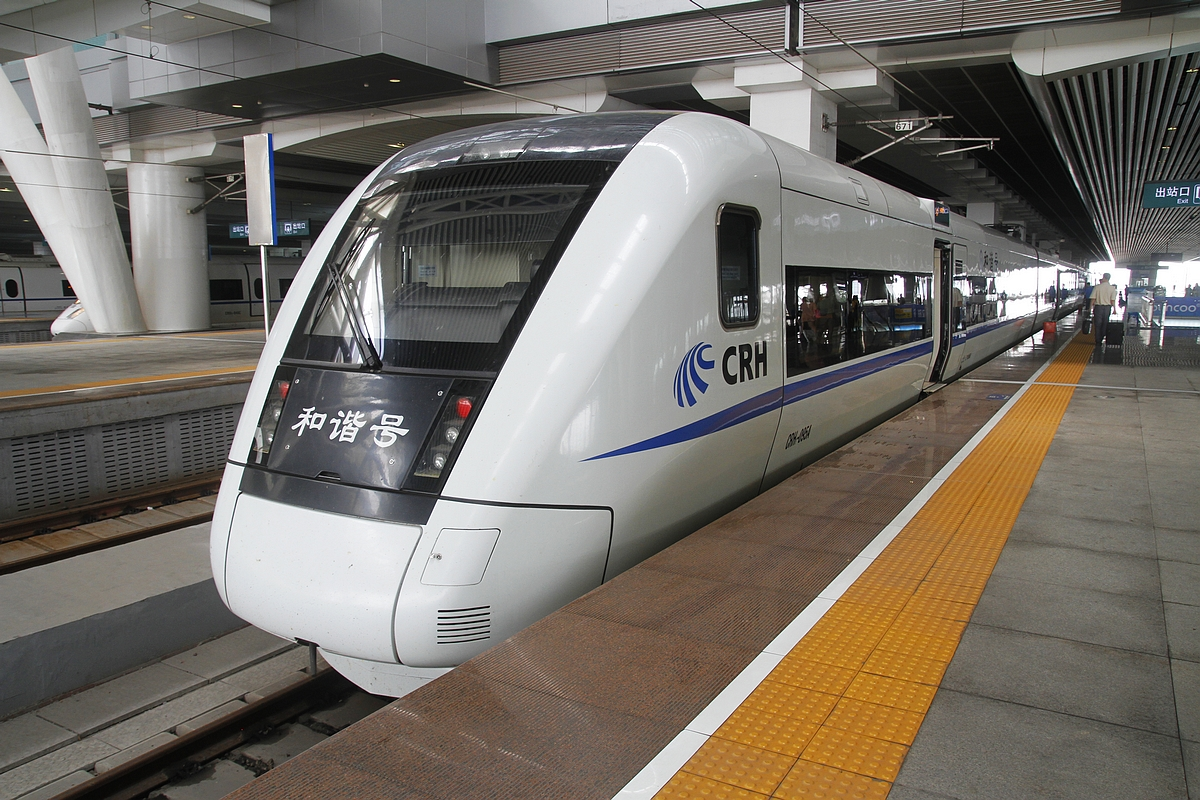
CRH1A in Guangzhou South Railway Station

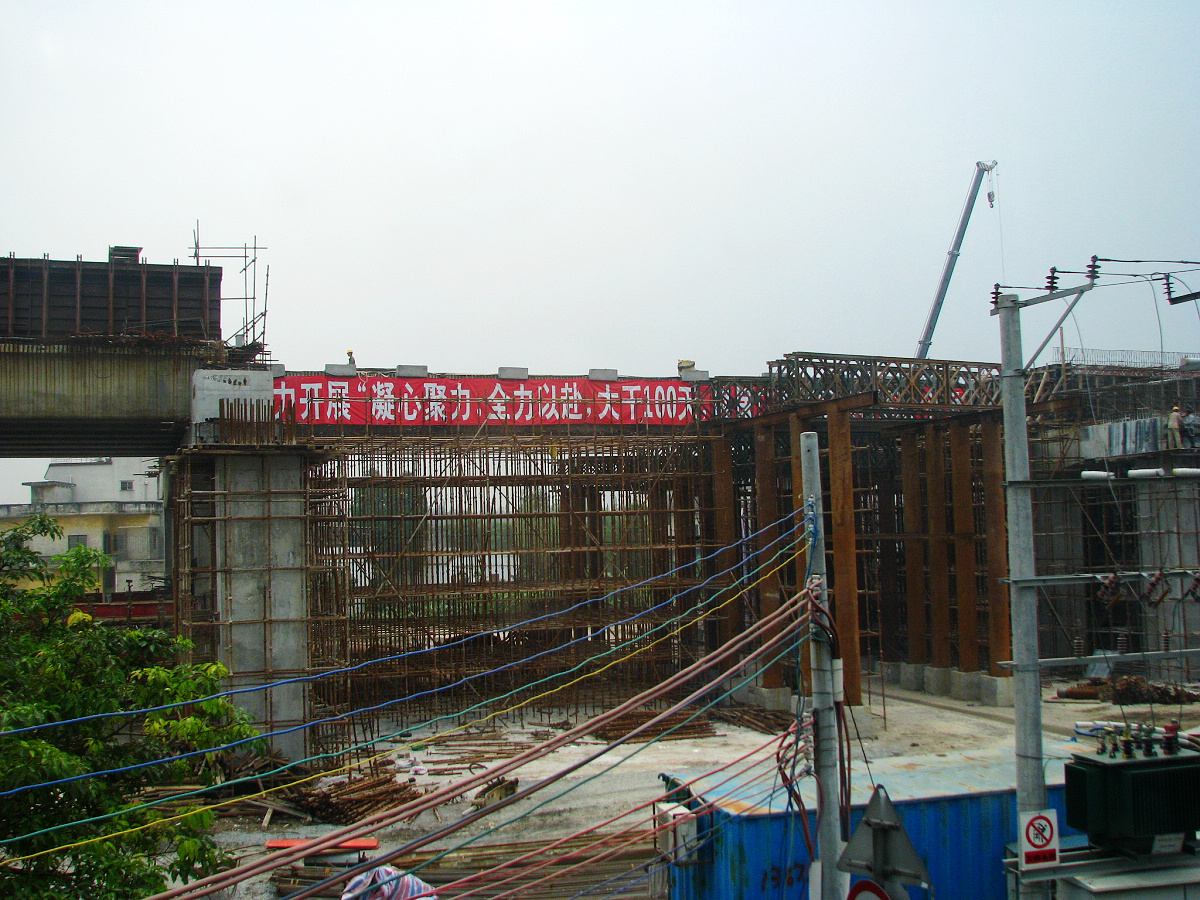
Guangzhu Railway in construction, June 2010

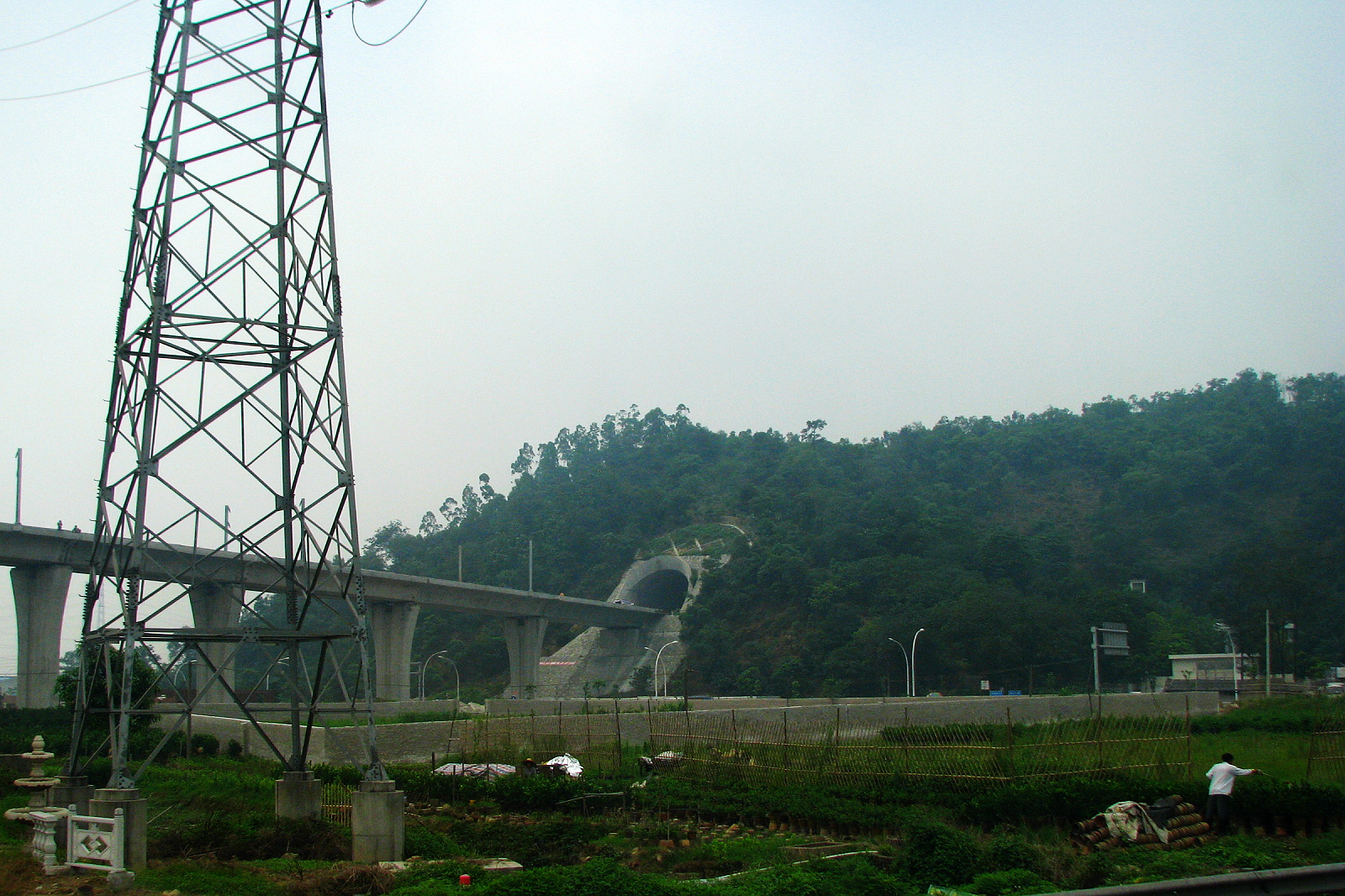
Duninggang Tunnel (都宁港隧道) of Guangzhu Railway

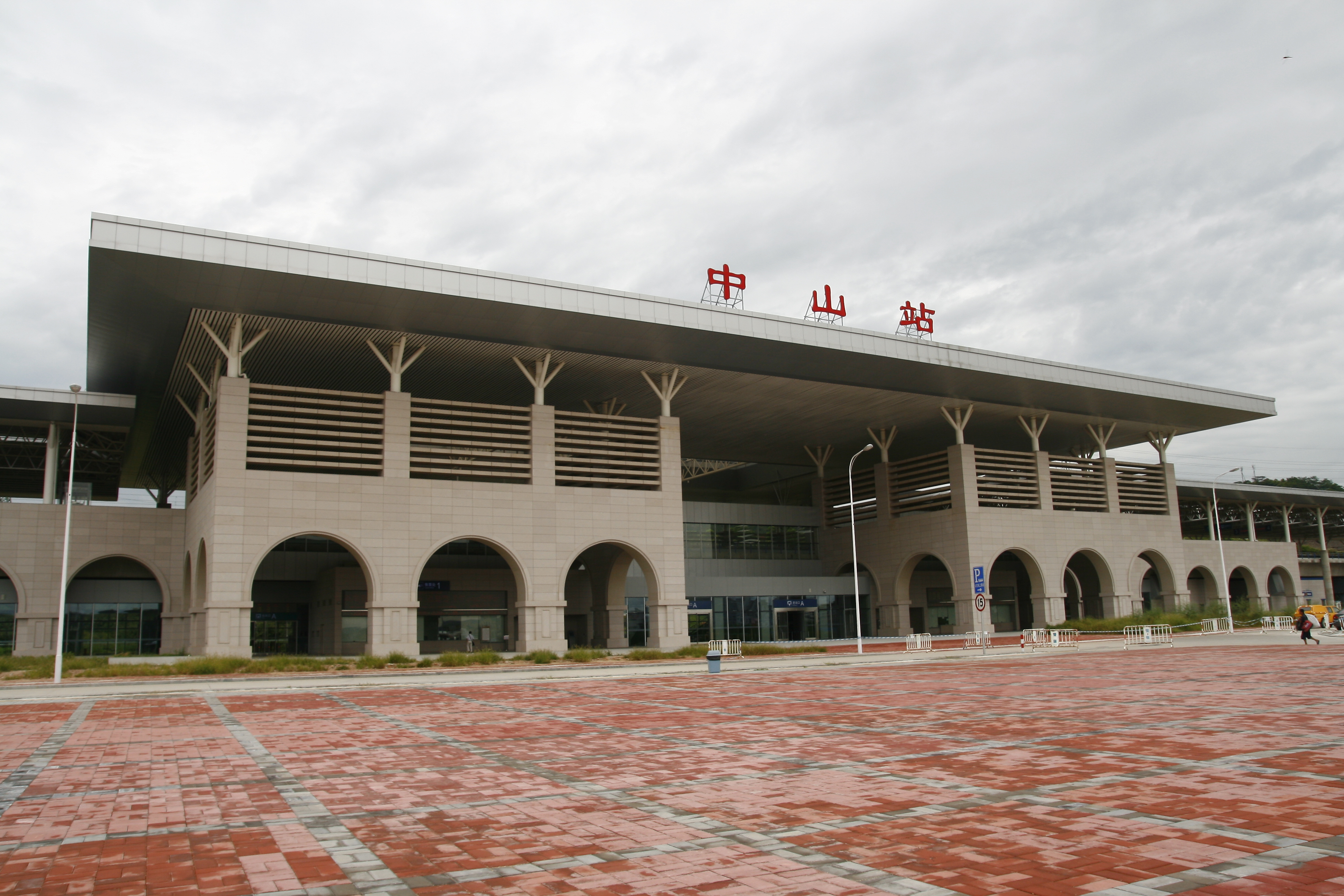
Zhongshan railway station (中山站)

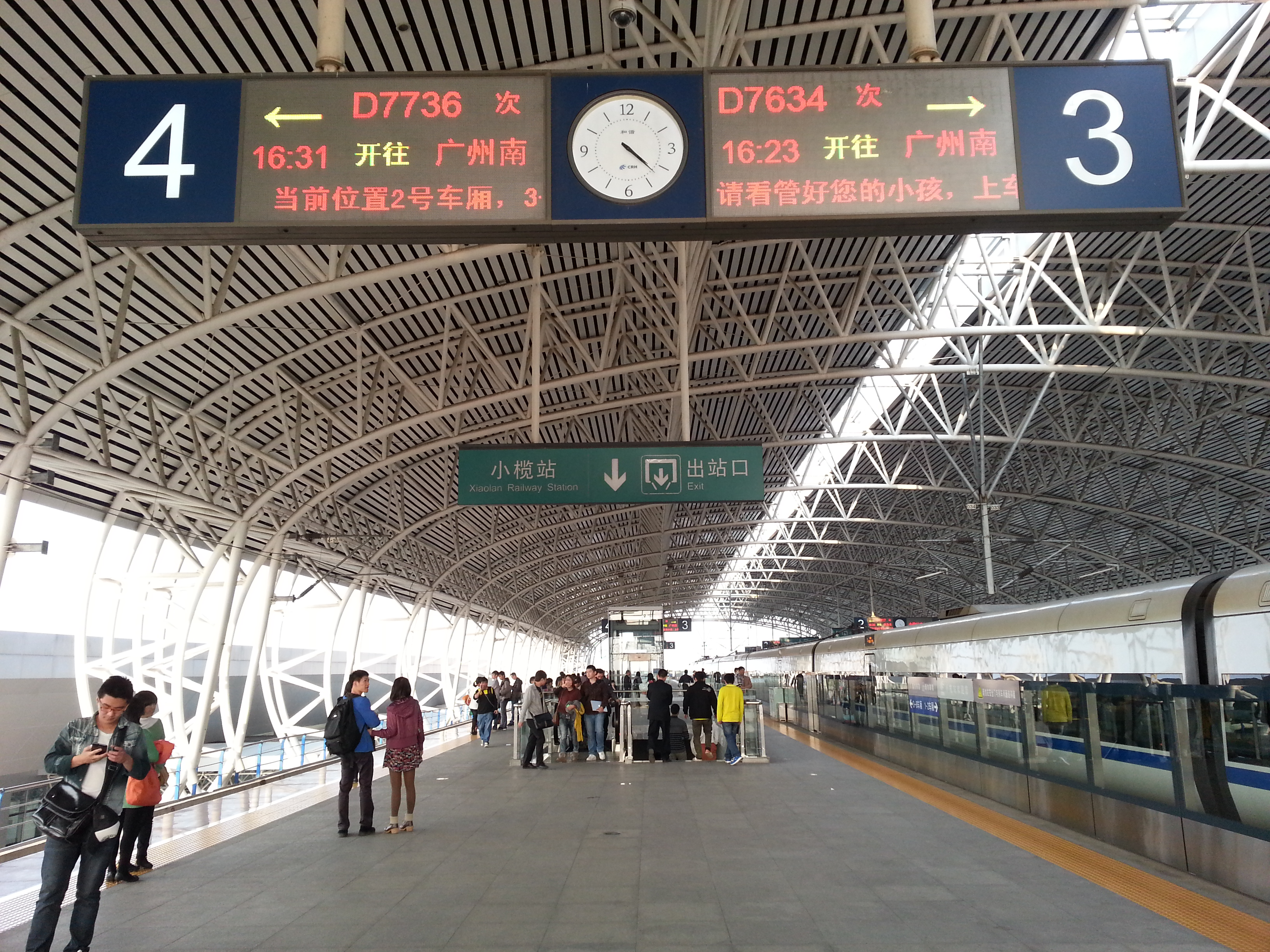
Xiaolan railway station (小榄站) Platform

== Stations ==
Route		Station №	Station Name	Chinese	Distance km		PRDIR (CR C-train) transfers/connections	Metro transfers/connections	Location	
●	●	IZQ	Guangzhou South (Guangzhounan)	广州南	0.00	0.00	PYA GH Guangzhao ER	2 7 22; 2	Panyu, Guangzhou	
|	|	BLQ	Bijiang^{1}	碧江	5.05	5.05			Shunde, Foshan	
●	●	IBQ	Beijiao	北滘	5.13	10.18			Shunde, Foshan	
●	●	ORQ	Shunde	顺德	4.85	15.03			Shunde, Foshan	
●	●	OJQ	Shundexueyuan (Shunde Polytechnic)	顺德学院	7.54	22.57		3	Shunde, Foshan	
●	●	RUQ	Ronggui	容桂	9.42	31.99			Shunde, Foshan	
●	●	NOQ	Nantou	南头	4.27	36.26			Zhongshan	
●	●	EAQ	Xiaolan	小榄	8.53	44.79			Zhongshan	
|	|	DRQ	Dongsheng^{1}	东升	6.71	51.50			Zhongshan	
●	|	ZGQ	Zhongshan North (Zhongshanbei)	中山北	12.15	63.65			Zhongshan	
●	|	ZSQ	Zhongshan	中山	5.92	69.57			Zhongshan	
●	|	NNQ	Nanlang	南朗	13.03	82.60			Zhongshan	
●	|	IHQ	Cuiheng	翠亨	5.26	87.86				
●	|	ZIQ	Zhuhai North (Zhuhaibei)	珠海北	4.28	92.14			Xiangzhou, Zhuhai	
●	|	PDQ	Tangjiawan	唐家湾	4.25	96.39			Xiangzhou, Zhuhai	
●	|	MFQ	Mingzhu	明珠	11.85	108.24			Xiangzhou, Zhuhai	
●	|	QXQ	Qianshan	前山	4.05	112.29			Xiangzhou, Zhuhai	
●	|	ZHQ	Zhuhai	珠海	3.81	116.10	Zhuji		Xiangzhou, Zhuhai	
	●	GNQ	Guzhen	古镇	8.76	124.86			Zhongshan	
	●	JNQ	Jianghai	江海	4.68	129.54			Jianghai	Jiangmen
	●	JWQ	Jiangmen East (Jiangmendong)	江门东	6.71	136.25			Jianghai	Jiangmen
	●	UEQ	Liyue	礼乐	3.20	139.45			Jianghai	Jiangmen
	●	EFQ	Xinhui	新会	3.58	143.03			Xinhui	Jiangmen
	●	JOQ	Jiangmen	江门					Xinhui	Jiangmen

Note:
^{1} Services of Bijiang and Dongsheng stations are suspended since 11 October 2020.
