= Nanlang railway station =

Railway station in Nanlang, China

Nanlang 南朗
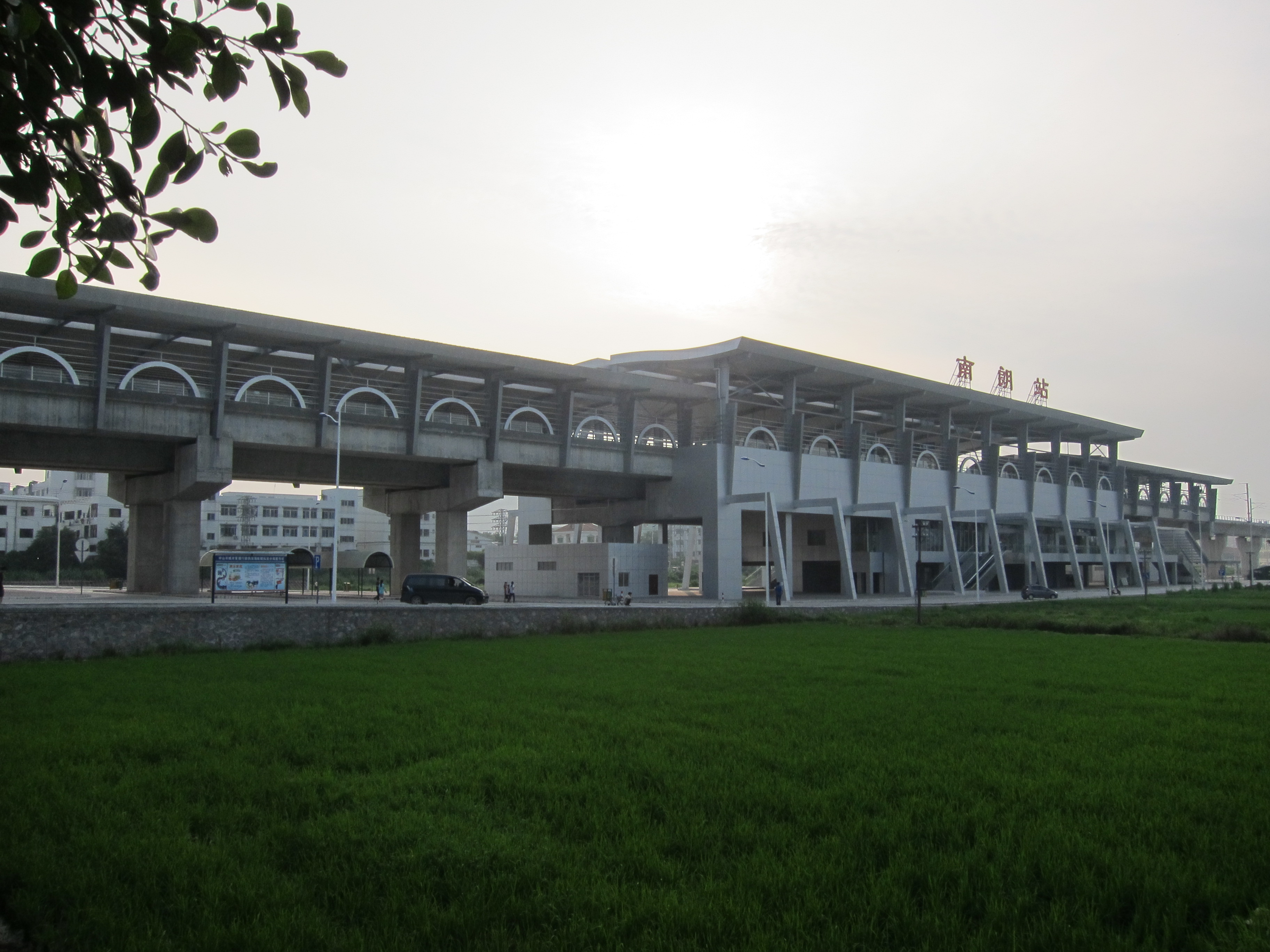

General information
- Location: Nanqi Nanlu, Nanlang, Zhongshan, Guangdong; China
- Coordinates: 22°28′58.86″N 113°32′6.89″E
- Owned by: Guangdong Guangzhu Intercity Rail Transit
- Operated by: CR Guangzhou
- Line(s): Guangzhou–Zhuhai intercity railway
- Platforms: 2 (side platforms)
- Connections: Bus routes 12, 083, 084, 085, 212

Construction
- Structure type: Elevated

Other information
- Station code: NNQ

History
- Opened: 7 January 2011

Services
Preceding station	Pearl River Delta Metropolitan Region Intercity Railway	Following station
Zhongshan towards Guangzhou South	Guangzhou–Zhuhai intercity railway	Cuiheng towards Zhuhai
Location

Nanlang railway station (Chinese: 南朗站) is an elevated station of Guangzhou–Zhuhai intercity railway.

The station is located near Yakou Village (Chinese: 崖口村), Nanlang Town, Zhongshan, Guangdong, China, a famous seafood village in Zhongshan. It started operations on 7 January 2011.
