= Shundexueyuan railway station =

Railway station in Foshan, China

Shundexueyuan 顺德学院
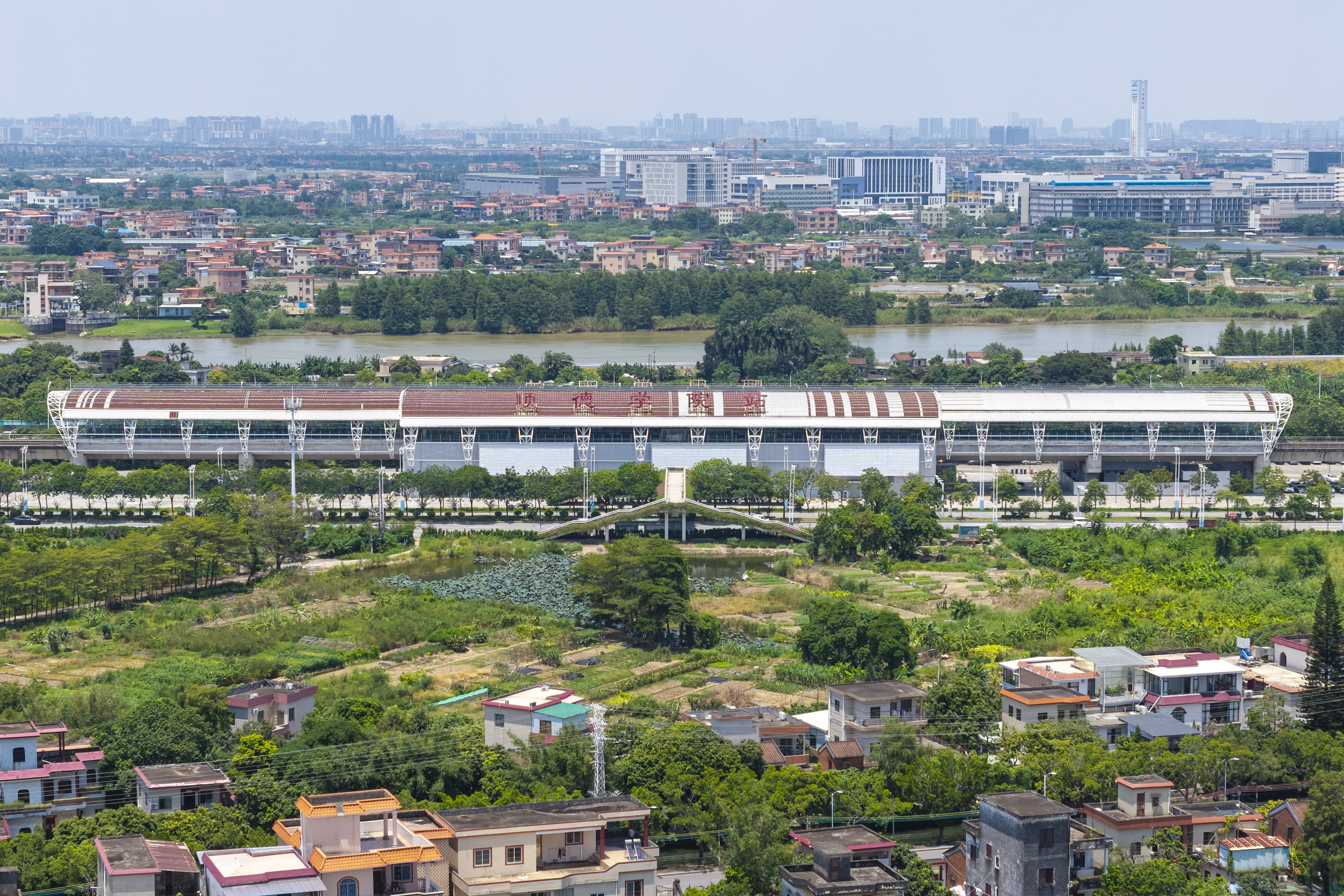
- Exterior

General information
- Location: Fengshapian, Daliang Subdistrict; Shunde District, Foshan, Guangdong; China
- Line: Guangzhou-Zhuhai Intercity Railway
- Connections: 3 Shunde College Railway Station

Construction
- Structure type: Elevated
- Accessible: Yes

Other information
- Station code: OJQ

History
- Opened: 1 February 2013; 13 years ago

Services
Preceding station	Pearl River Delta Metropolitan Region Intercity Railway	Following station
Shunde towards Guangzhou South	Guangzhou–Zhuhai intercity railway	Ronggui towards Zhuhai
Transfer at Shunde College Railway Station
Preceding station	Foshan Metro	Following station
Shunde OCT Harbour PLUS towards Foshan University	Line 3	Terminus
Location

Shunde College railway station (Chinese: 顺德学院站; pinyin: Shùndé Xuéyuàn Zhàn; lit. 'Shunde Polytechnic railway station'), is an elevated station of Guangzhou-Zhuhai Intercity Railway.

The station is located at Fengsha (Chinese: 逢沙), Daliang Subdistrict, Shunde District, Foshan, Guangdong Province, China, near Shunde Polytechnic University (Chinese: 顺德职业技术大学). It is at the east of Bigui Road (Chinese: 碧桂路), the west of Desheng Road (Chinese: 德胜路) and in the middle of Guangzhou-Zhuhai Expressway West Line (Chinese: 广珠西线高速公路) and Nanguo East Road (Chinese: 南国东路), near Lijiasha Channel (Chinese: 李家沙水道) and Guipan River (Chinese: 桂畔海). The line started operation on 7 January 2011, but the opening date for the station was two years later, on 1 February 2013.

== Gallery ==
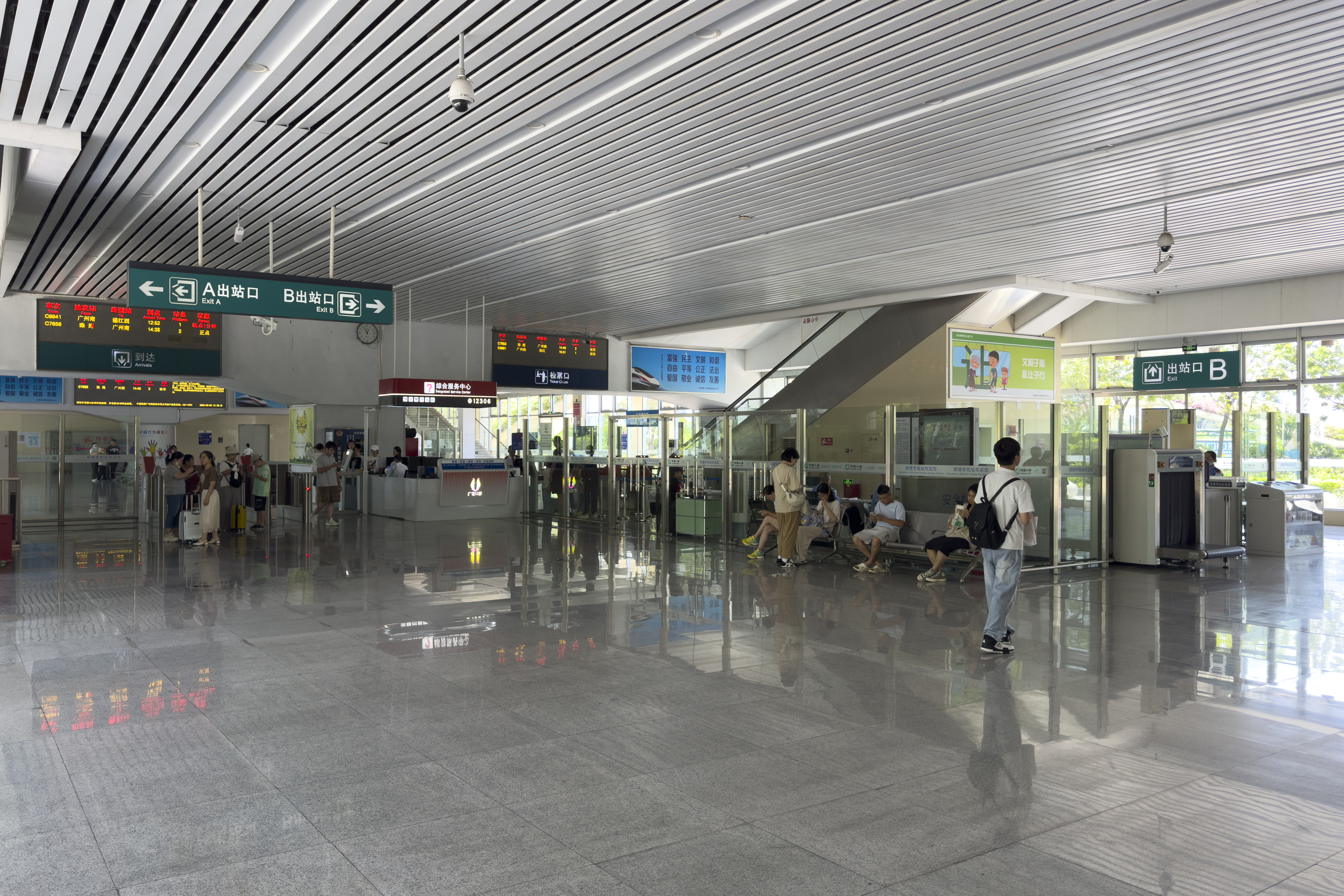
Concourse

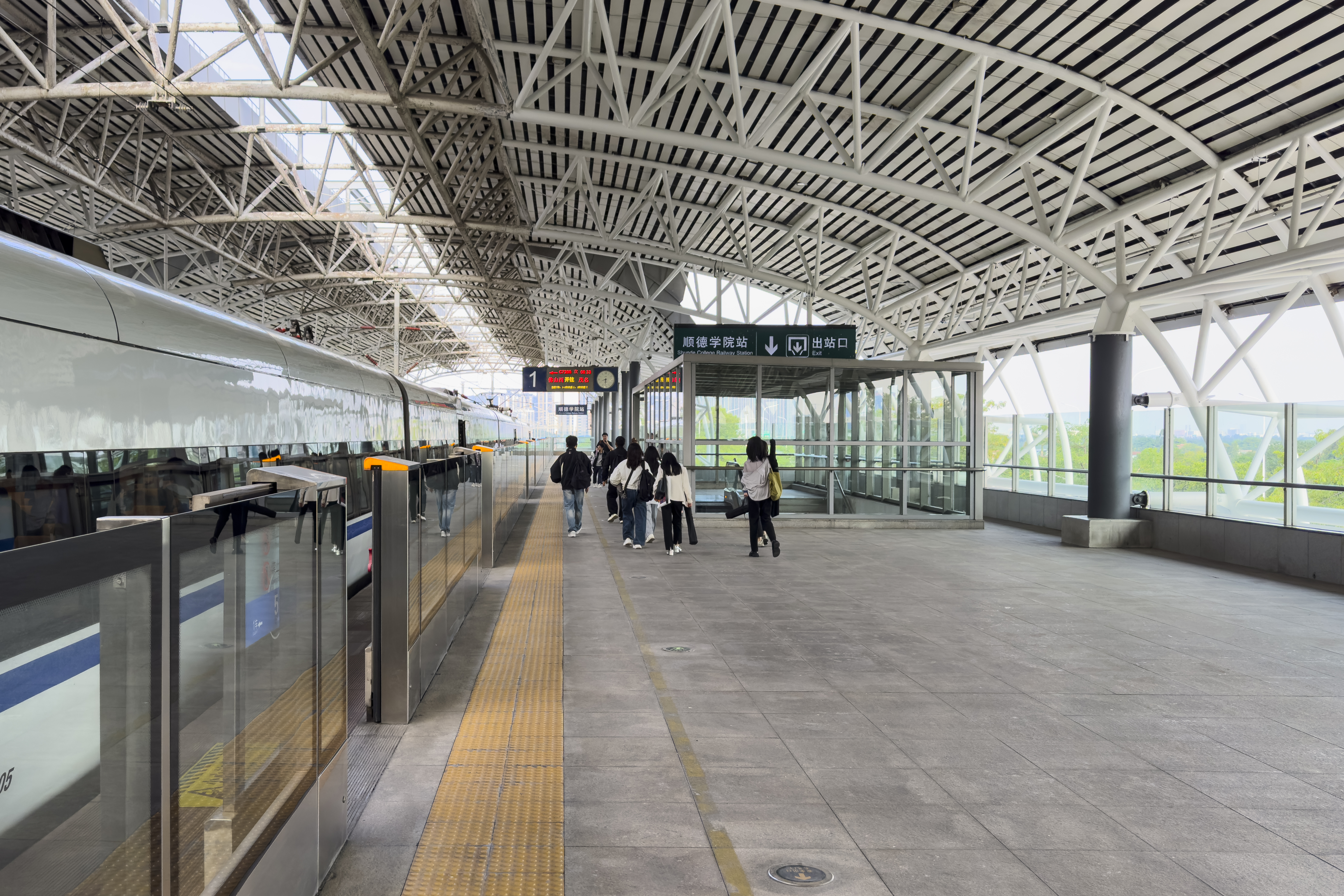
Platform 1
