= Li Yue =

Chinese businessman

- Education: Beijing University of Posts and Telecommunications; Tianjin University; Hong Kong Polytechnic University
- Occupations: CEO, China Mobile

Li Yue (Chinese: 李跃) is a Chinese businessman, the CEO of China Mobile, the largest mobile network operator in China.

He has a bachelor's degree in telephone exchange from Beijing University of Posts and Telecommunications, an MBA from Tianjin University and a doctorate in business administration from Hong Kong Polytechnic University.

In September 2019, Li Yue retired as China Mobile CEO at the age of 60.
