= Liyue railway station =

Railway station in Guangdong, China

Coordinates: 22.5248°N 113.0999°E

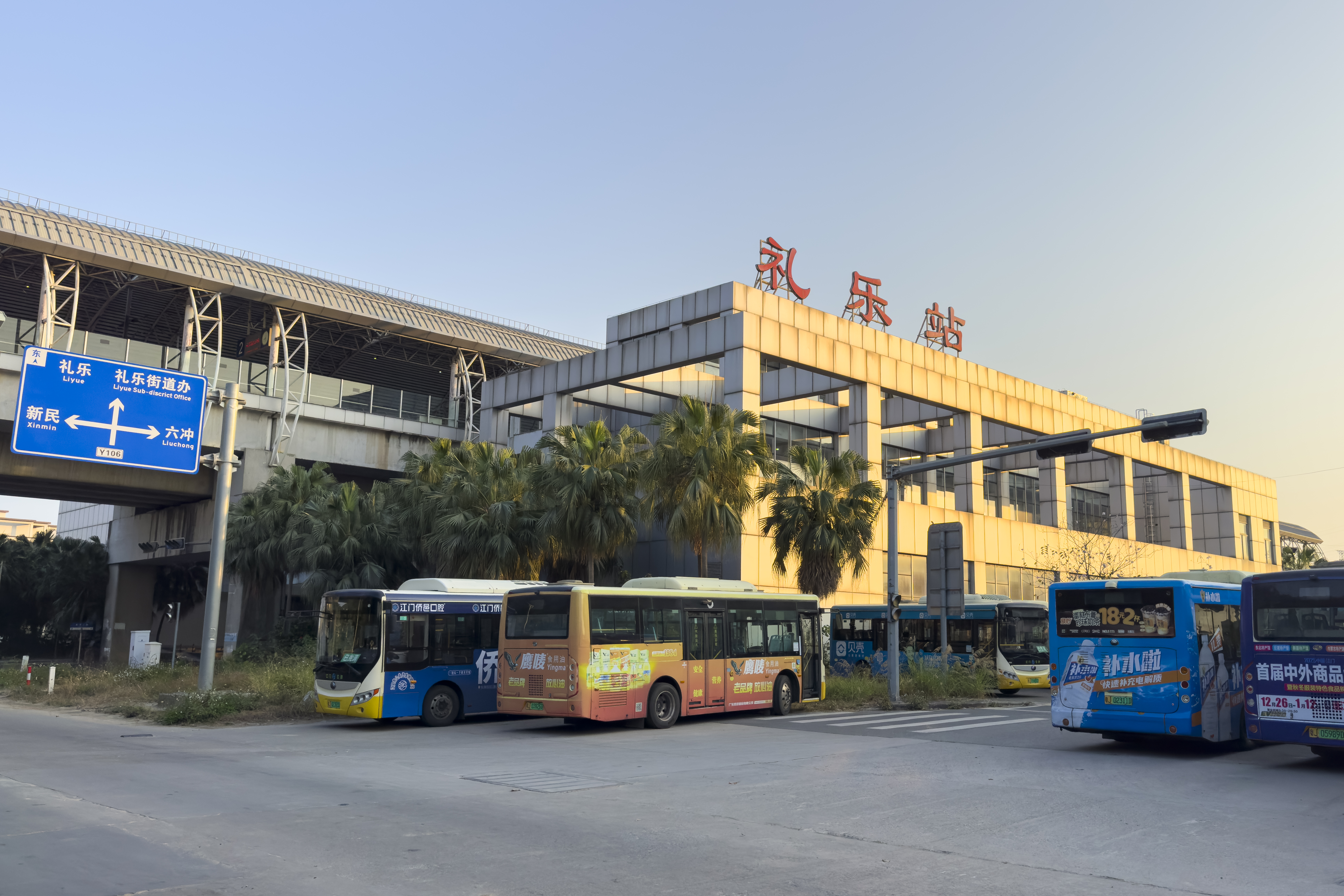
West facade

Liyue railway station (Chinese: 礼乐站; pinyin: Lǐyuè zhàn), also commonly mispronounced as Lile railway station, formerly known as Xinmin railway station (Chinese: 新民站) during planning, is an elevated station on the Guangzhou-Zhuhai intercity railway Jiangmen Spur Line.

The station is located in Liyue Avenue (Chinese: 礼乐大道) in the Liyue Subdistrict (Chinese: 礼乐街道) of the Jianghai District of Jiangmen City, Guangdong Province, China, near Xinmin Village Committee (Chinese: 新民村村委会). It started operation on 10 January 2024.
