= Jianghai railway station =

Railway station in Guangdong, China

Coordinates: 22.5814°N 113.1596°E

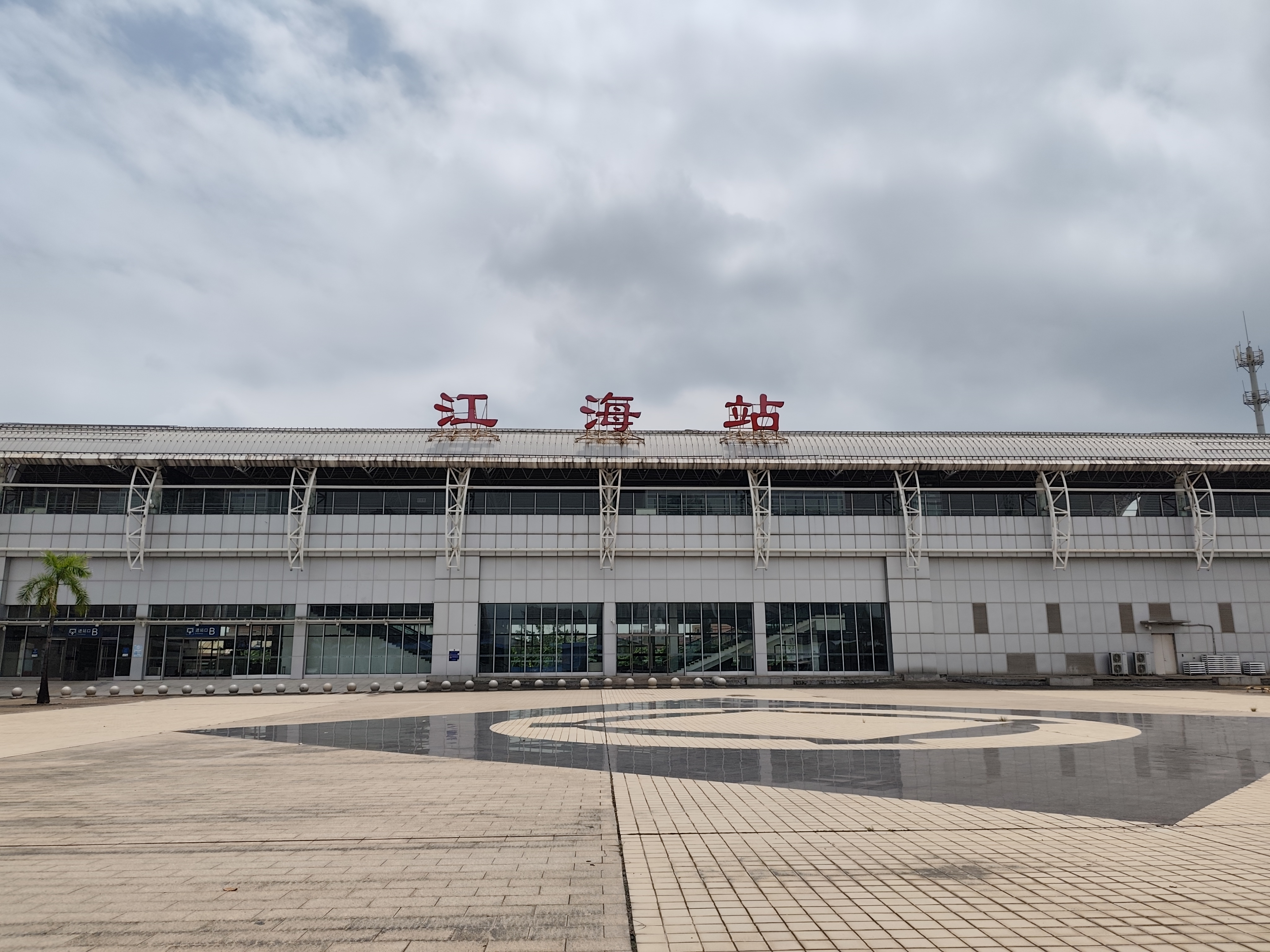
Outside the station (taken in September 2026)

Jianghai railway station (Chinese: 江海站), formerly known as Waihai railway station (Chinese: 外海站), is an elevated station on the Guangzhou-Zhuhai intercity railway Jiangmen Spur Line.

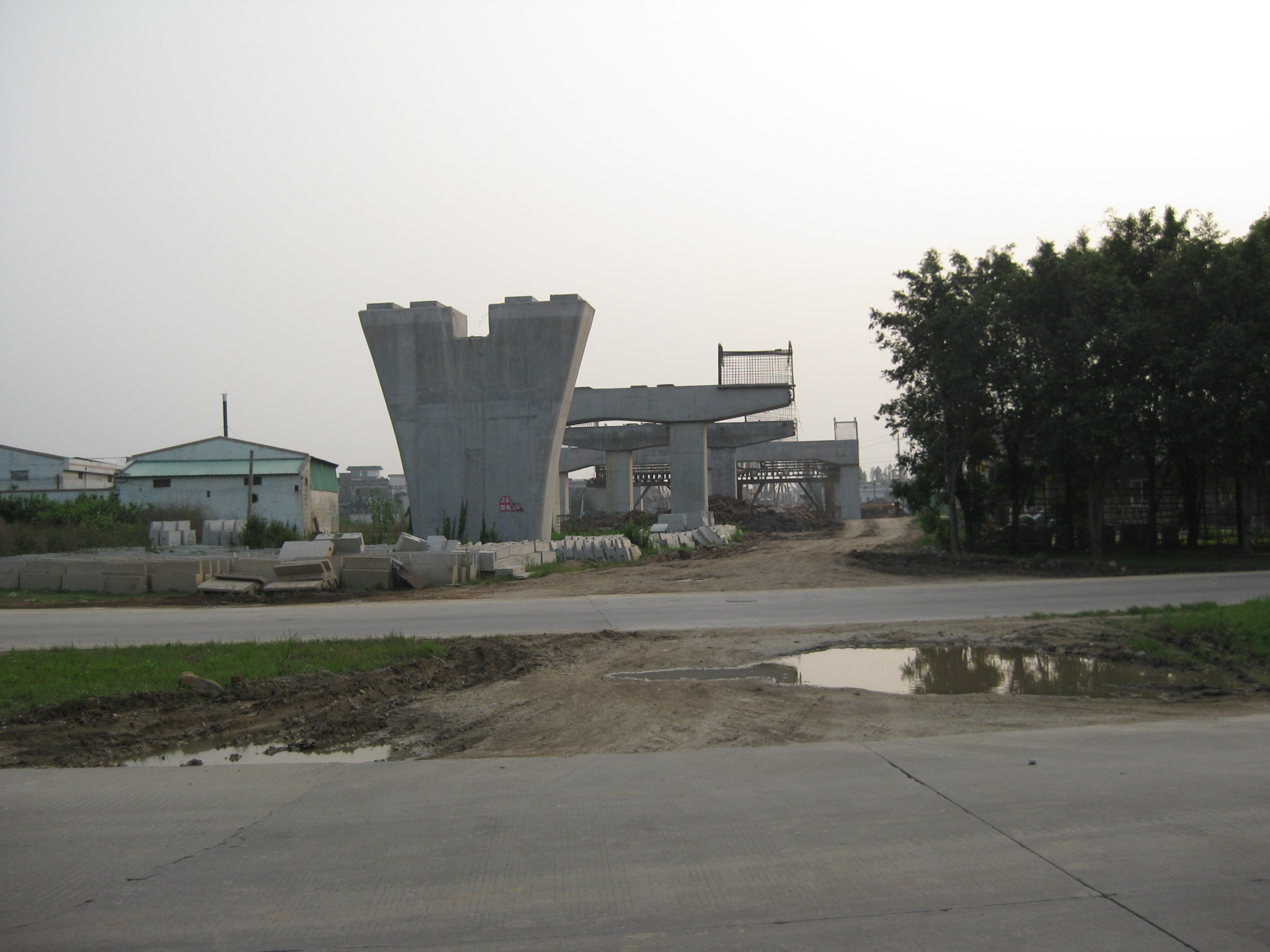
Jianghai station under construction in 2009

The station is located at the junction of Qianjin Village (前进村) and Qidong Village (七东村) in Waihai Subdistrict (外海街道), Jianghai District, Jiangmen, Guangdong Province, China, opposite Guzhen, Zhongshan across the river. It is the first station in Jiangmen for trains heading into the city.
