= Xiaolan railway station =

Railway station in Zhongshan, China

Xiaolan Station 小榄站
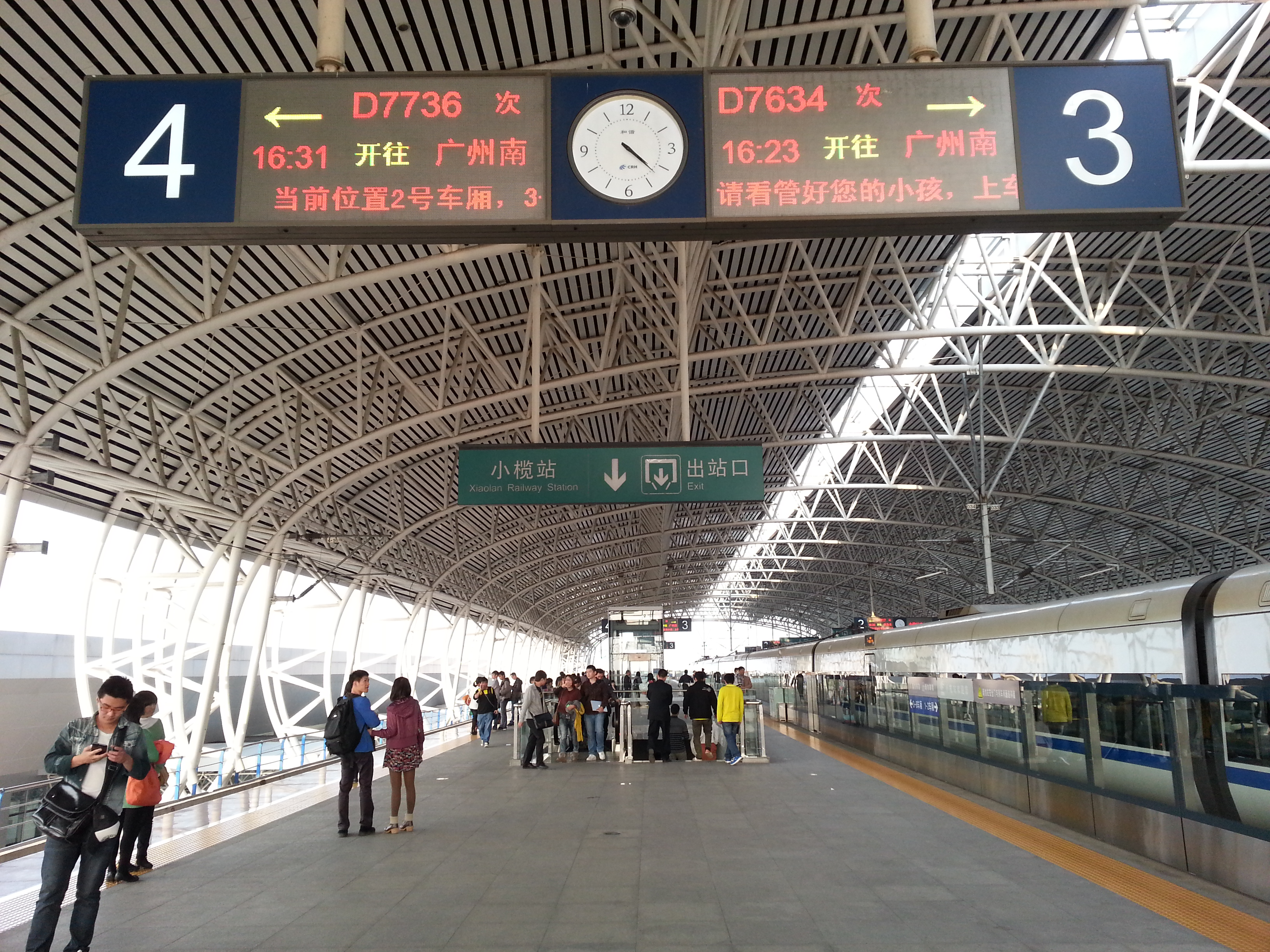
- Xiaolan Station Platform

General information
- Location: Xiaolan Town, Zhongshan, Guangdong; China
- Coordinates: 22°39′3″N 113°15′50″E
- Operator: CR Guangzhou
- Line: Guangzhou-Zhuhai Intercity Railway
- Platforms: 2 Island Platforms

Other information
- Station code: TMIS code: 65918 Telegraph code: EAQ Pinyin code: XLA

History
- Opened: 7 January 2011

Services
Preceding station	Pearl River Delta Metropolitan Region Intercity Railway	Following station
Nantou towards Guangzhou South	Guangzhou–Zhuhai intercity railway	Zhongshan North towards Zhuhai
Terminus	Guangzhou–Zhuhai intercity railway Jiangmen branch	Guzhen towards Jiangmen
Location

Xiaolan railway station (Chinese: 小榄站) is an elevated station on Guangzhou–Zhuhai intercity railway. It is also an interchange station for trains travelling towards Zhuhai and Jiangmen.

The station is located at the intersection of South Min'an Road (Chinese: 民安南路) and China National Highway 105, Xiaolan Town, Zhongshan, Guangdong, China. It started operating on 7 January 2011.

== Station Layout ==
Xiaolan Station is an elevated, three-level Island platform Station. The ground level contain entrances, second level is station waiting room. Third level is railway platforms. The station building covers an area of approximately 28,000 square metres.

Ground Level
Entrances and exits
Station entrances and exits, equipment rooms
Level 1
Concourse
Ticket Machines, Customer Service, waiting area.
Level 2

Platforms

Platform 4
Towards Guangzhou South (Nantou)
Island platform
Platform 3
Towards Guangzhou South (Nantou)
Platform 2
Towards Zhuhai (Zhongshan North)
Island platform
Platform 1
Towards Zhuhai/Jiangmen (Zhongshan North/Guzhen)

== Gallery ==
Xiaolan Station Waiting Room

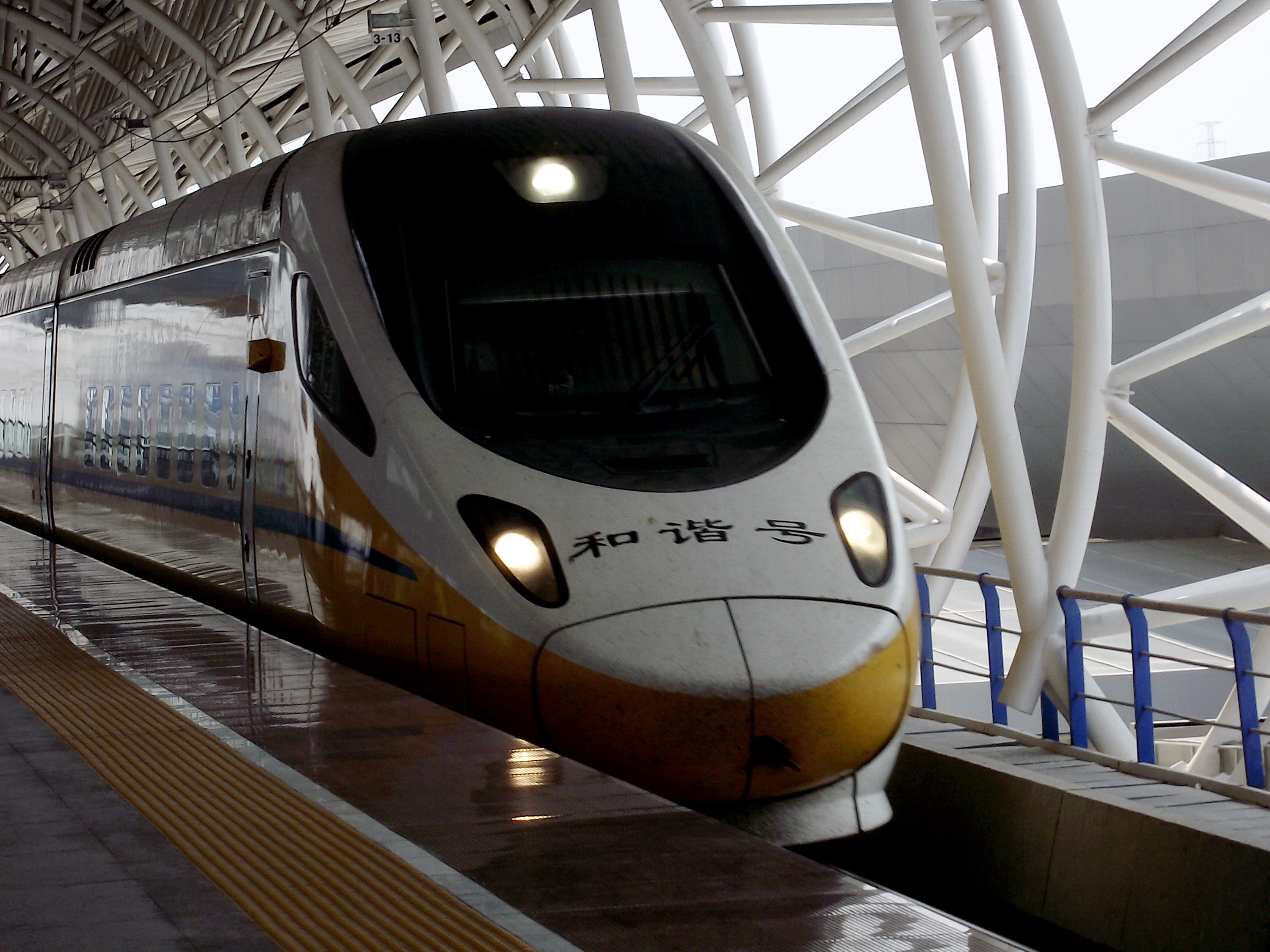
CR Comprehensive inspection trains passing at Xiaolan Station

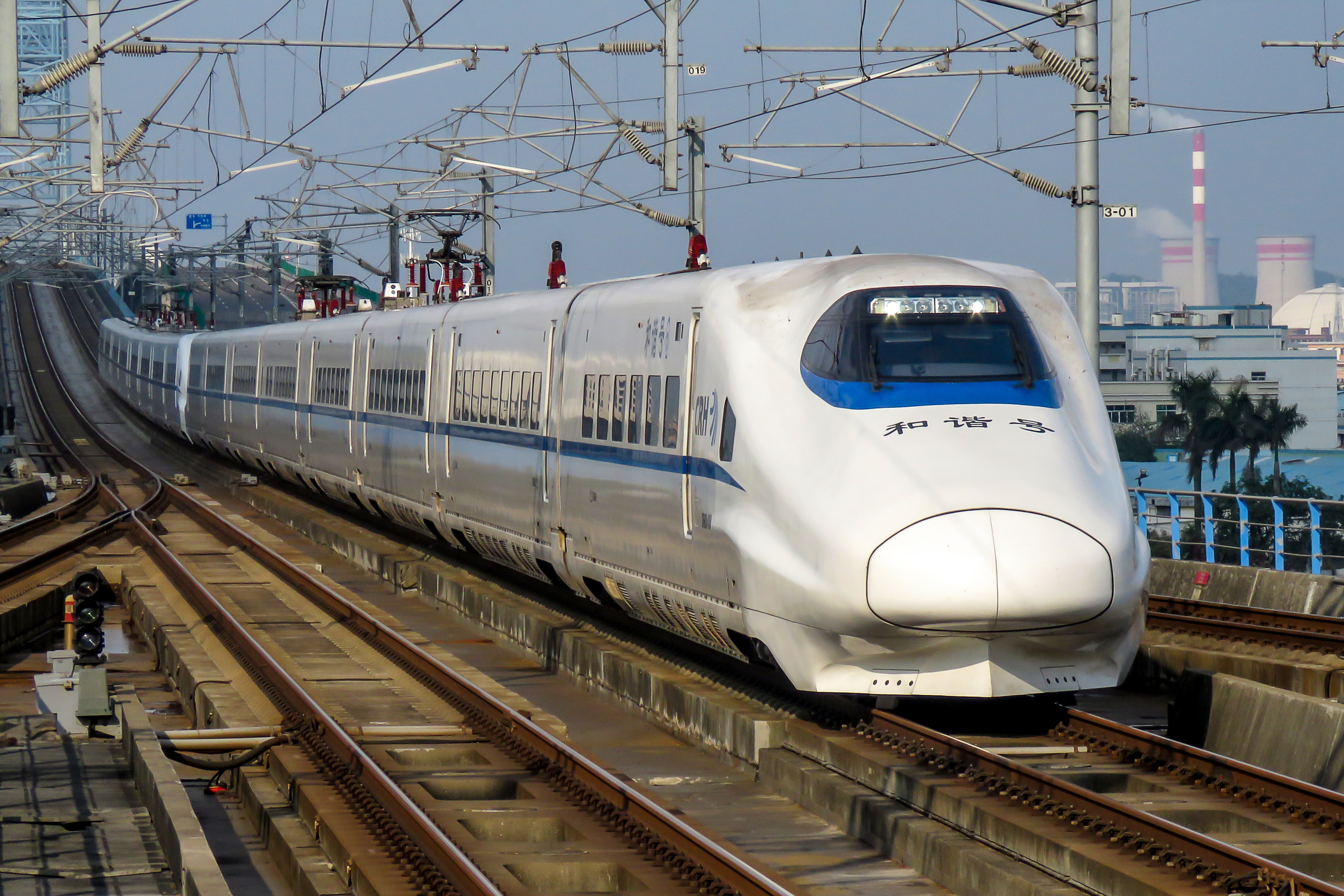
CRH2A Train passing at Xiaolan Station

Preceding station	Pearl River Delta Metropolitan Region Intercity Railway	Following station
Nantou towards Guangzhou South	Guangzhou–Zhuhai intercity railway Suspended 2020	Dongsheng towards Zhuhai
