= Jiangmen railway station =

Railway station in Jiangmen, Guangdong

Jiangmen 江门
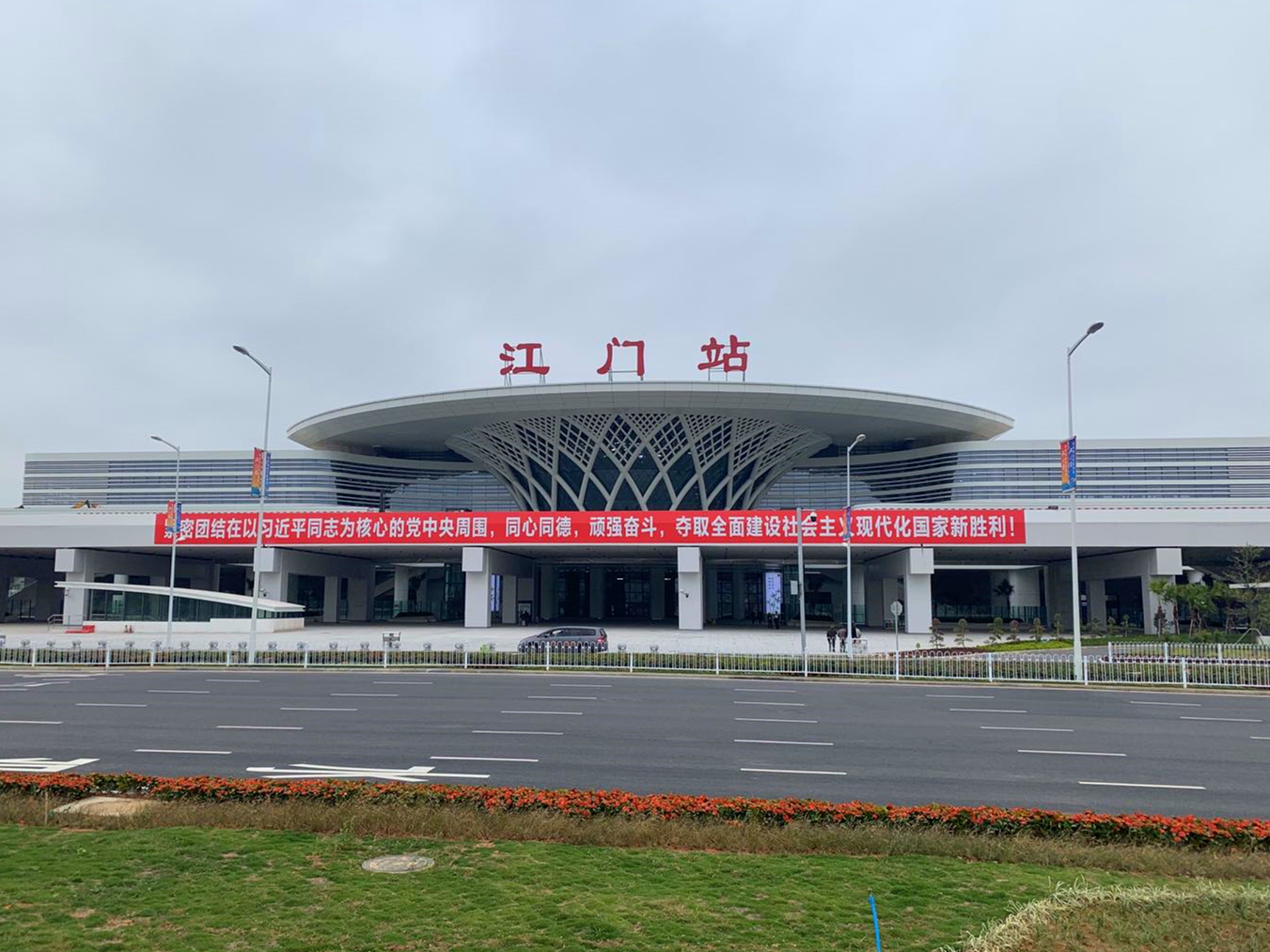
- Station building

General information
- Location: Xinhui District, Jiangmen, Guangdong; China
- Lines: Guangzhou–Zhuhai railway (freight only); Guangzhou–Zhuhai intercity railway Shenzhen–Zhanjiang high-speed railway Zhuhai-Zhaoqing High-Speed Railway

Other information
- Station code: TMIS code: 23498; Telegraph code: JOQ; Pinyin code: JME

History
- Opened: 29 December 2012 (freight); 15 November 2020 (passenger)

Services
Preceding station	China Railway High-speed	Following station
Xinhui towards Xiaolan	Guangzhou–Zhuhai intercity railway Jiangmen branch	Terminus
Location

Jiangmen railway station (Chinese: 江门站) is a passenger and freight railway station in Jiangmen south road, Xinhui District, Jiangmen, Guangdong, China. It was formerly a freight-only station called Jiangmen South, but has since been renamed and expanded to allow passenger operations.

The station is the southern terminus of a branch from the Guangzhou–Zhuhai intercity railway and the eastern terminus of the partially complete Shenzhen–Zhanjiang high-speed railway to Zhanjiang West. When complete, the Shenzhen–Zhanjiang will also provide a link east to Zhongshan and Shenzhen.

== History ==
This station opened on 29 December 2012 as Jiangmen South with the freight-only Guangzhou–Zhuhai railway.

In March 2017, the name of the station was changed to Jiangmen in preparation for its reconstruction as a passenger hub. At the same time, a different station previously called Jiangmen had its name changed to Jiangmen East railway station.

The Guangzhou–Zhuhai intercity railway branch was extended from its former terminus at Xinhui railway station south to Jiangmen to meet the first stage of the Shenzhen–Zhanjiang high-speed railway. Through services from Zhanjiang West to Guangzhou South began on 1 July 2018, though trains skipped the still under construction Jiangmen railway station.

The station was opened to passengers on 15 November 2020.

The Shenzhen–Zhanjiang high-speed railway，Construction of Jiangmen to Shenzhen section started on 9 October 2022.
