= Zhuhai railway station =

Railway station in Gongbei Subdistrict, Zhuhai, China

Coordinates: 22°13′06″N 113°32′42″E

Zhuhai 珠海
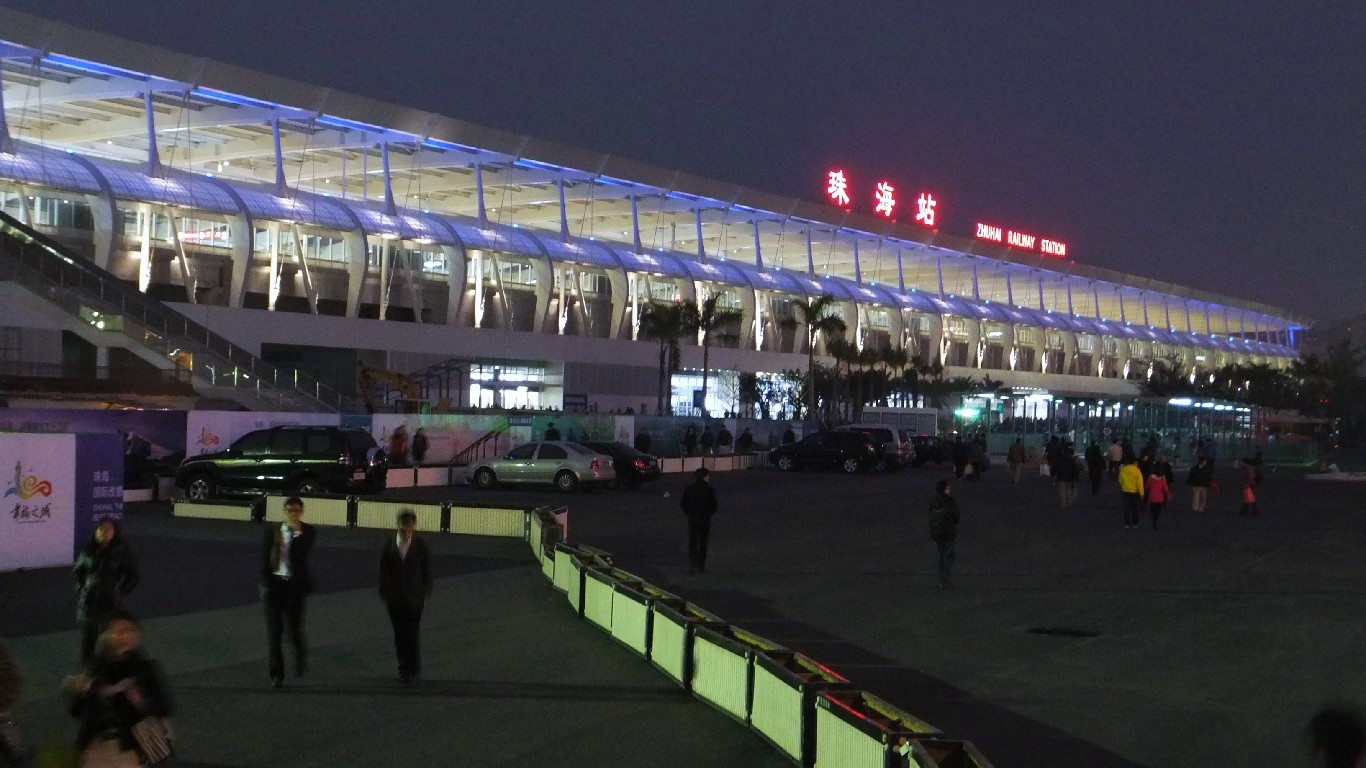

Chinese name
- Chinese: 珠海站
Transcriptions
Standard Mandarin
- Hanyu Pinyin: Zhūhǎi Zhàn
Yue: Cantonese
- Jyutping: zyu1 hoi2 zaam6

General information
- Other names: Gongbei
- Location: Changsheng Road, Xiangzhou District, Zhuhai, Guangdong, China
- Lines: Guangzhou–Zhuhai intercity railway Zhuhai–Zhuhai Airport intercity railway
- Platforms: 6 (Bay platform)
- Connections: Bus routes 1, 2, 31, 32, 207

Construction
- Structure type: Elevated

History
- Opened: 31 December 2012

Services
Preceding station	Pearl River Delta Metropolitan Region Intercity Railway	Following station
Qianshan towards Guangzhou South	Guangzhou–Zhuhai intercity railway	Terminus
Terminus	Zhuhai–Zhuhai Airport intercity railway	Wanzai North towards Zhuhai Airport
Location

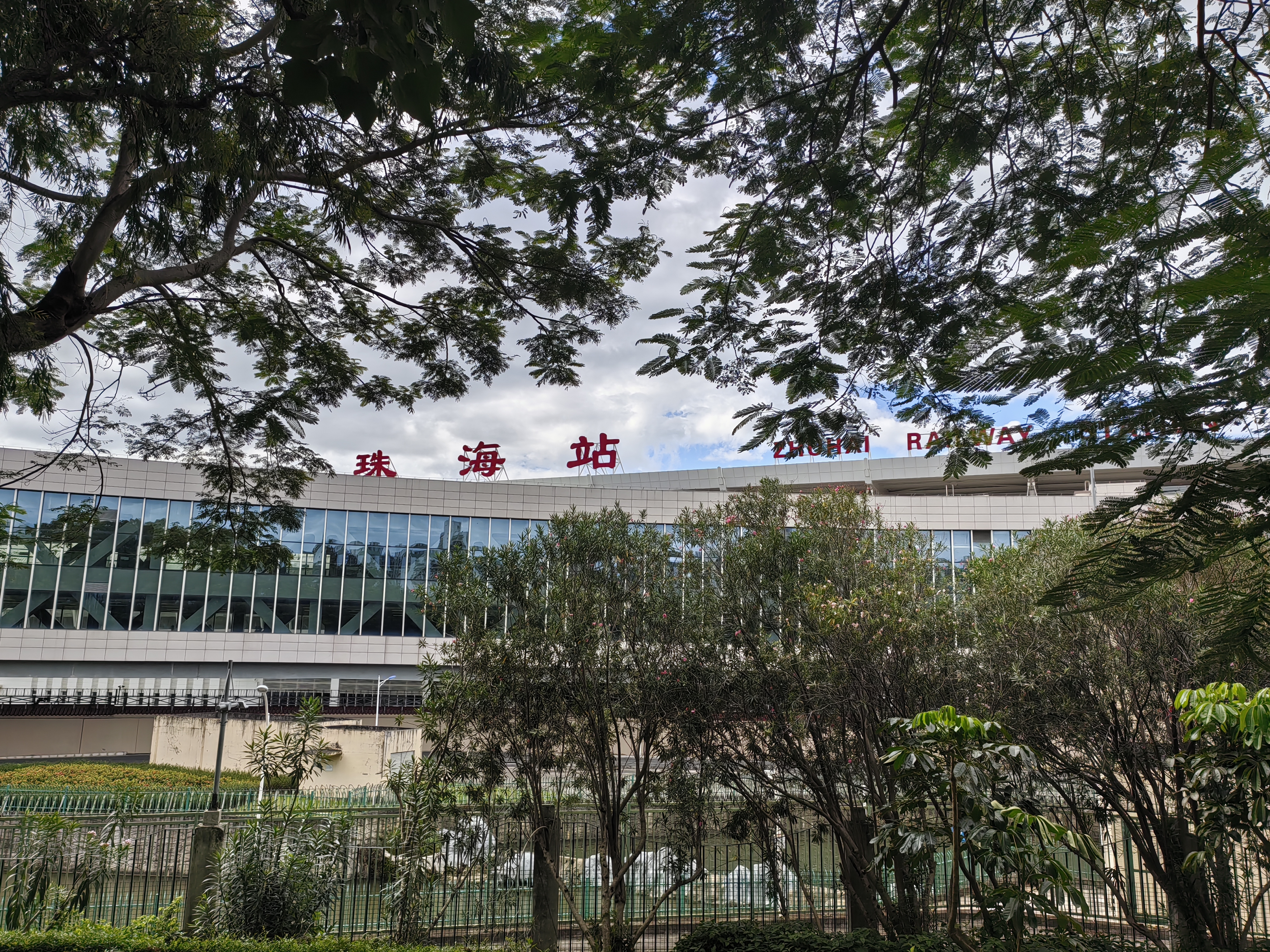
Zhuhai Railway Station seen from the Dr. Sun Yat Sen Municipal Park, Macau

Zhuhai railway station (Chinese: 珠海站; pinyin: Zhūhǎi Zhàn), also known as Gongbei station (拱北站), is an elevated station of the Guangzhou–Zhuhai intercity railway (Guangzhu ICR). It is located in the Gongbei Subdistrict (jiedao) of Xiangzhou in Zhuhai, Guangdong, China, beside the Gongbei Port and parallel to the border between mainland China and Macau. The station is the southern terminus of the Guangzhou–Zhuhai intercity railway and the northern terminus of the Zhuhai–Zhuhai Airport intercity railway.

== History ==
The station entered service on 31 December 2012, behind its target completion date of 31 July 2012, opening alongside three other stations that extended the line to downtown Zhuhai from the temporary terminus at the Zhuhai North railway station.

China Railway announced that a train service between Beijing West and Zhuhai would start on 27 November 2015. As the first interprovincial train from Zhuhai, this train ran as D923 from Beijing to Zhuhai, and D924 on the return trip.

The station was expanded to accommodate the Zhuhai–Zhuhai Airport intercity railway, which began operations on 18 August 2020.

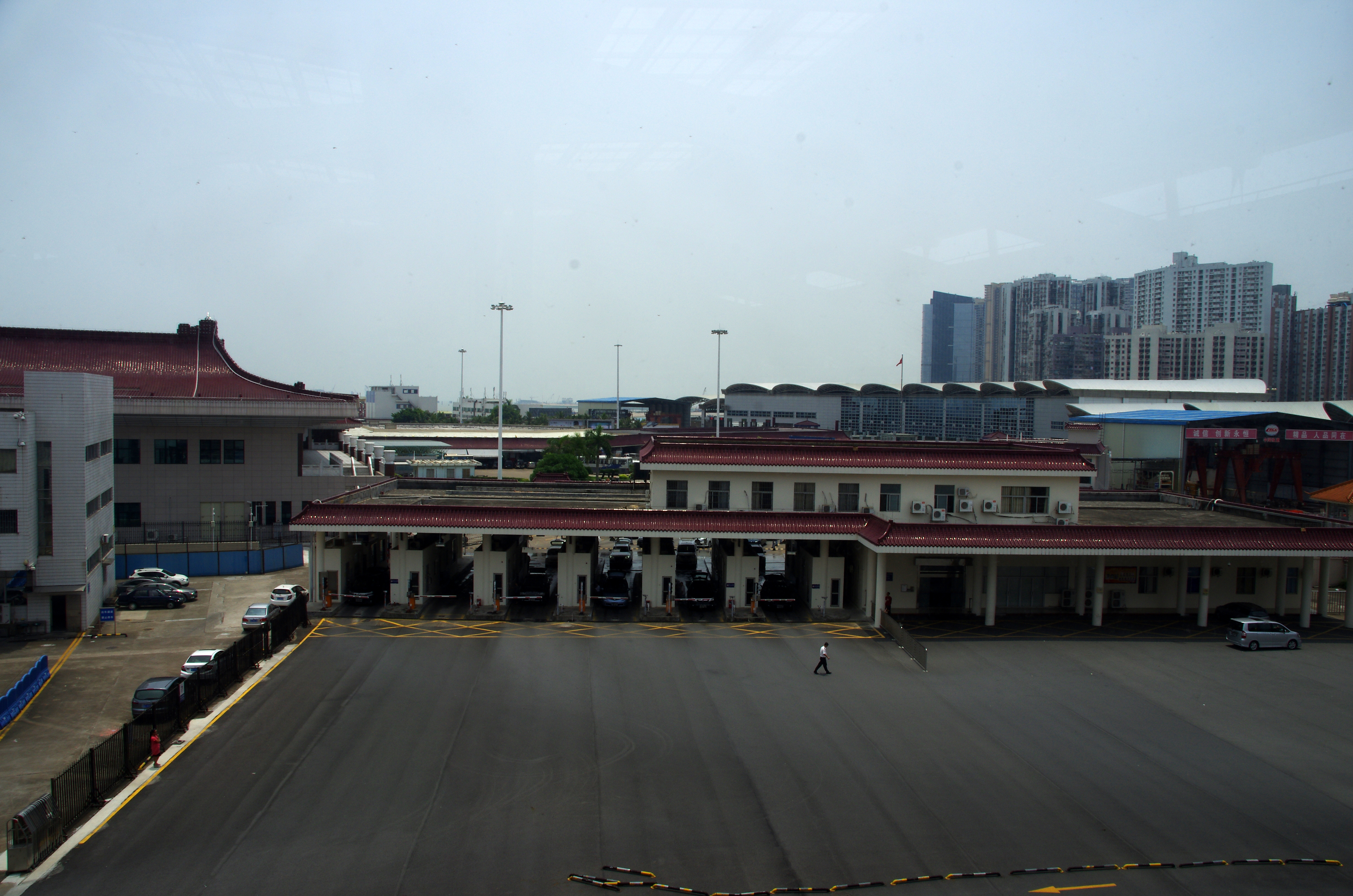
View of the Gongbei Port of Entry, Macau-mainland China border from the platform level of Zhuhai railway station

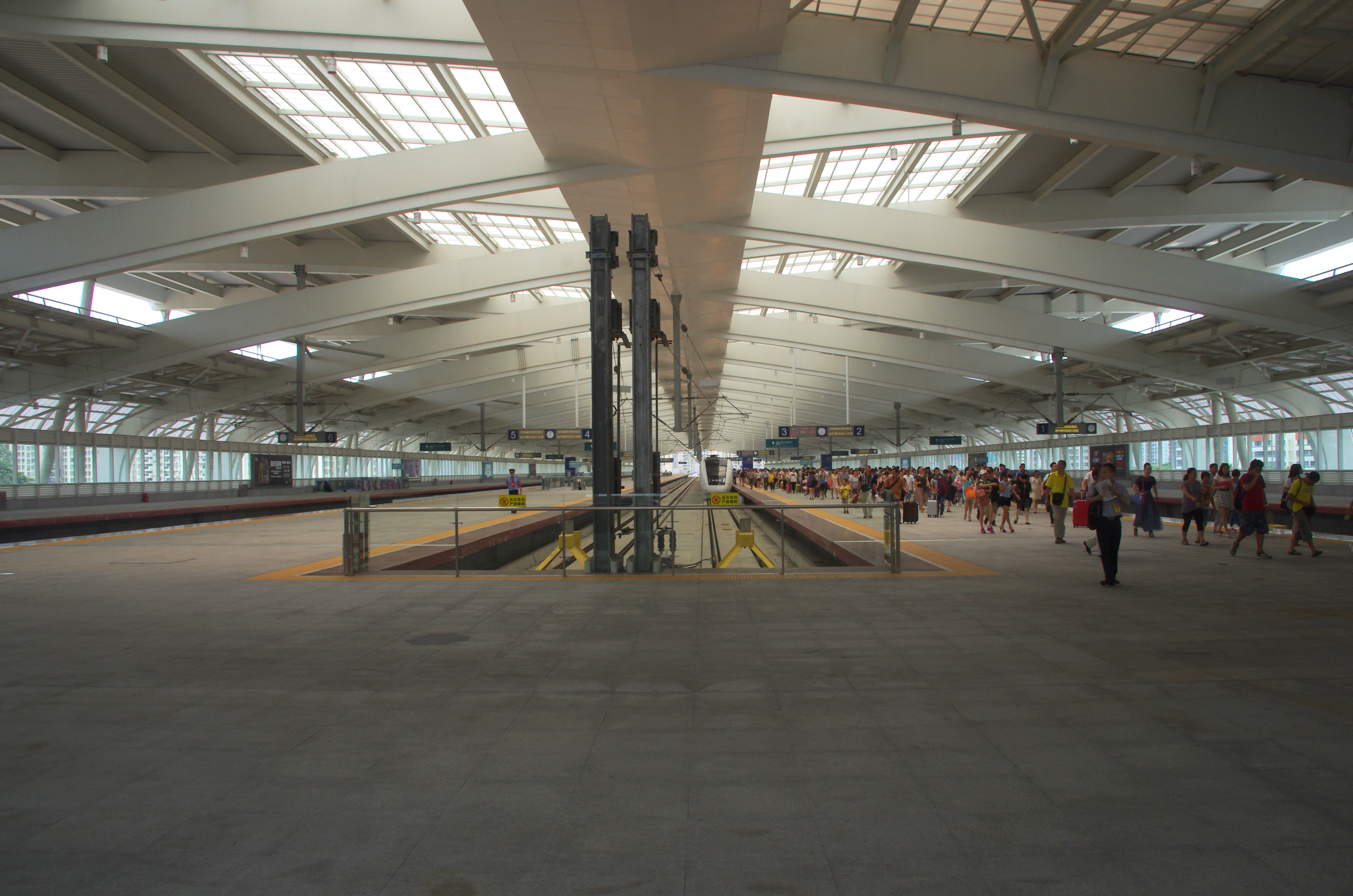
View across the terminal platforms at Zhuhai railway station
