= Yundonghai railway station =

Railway station in Foshan, Guangdong

Yundonghai 云东海
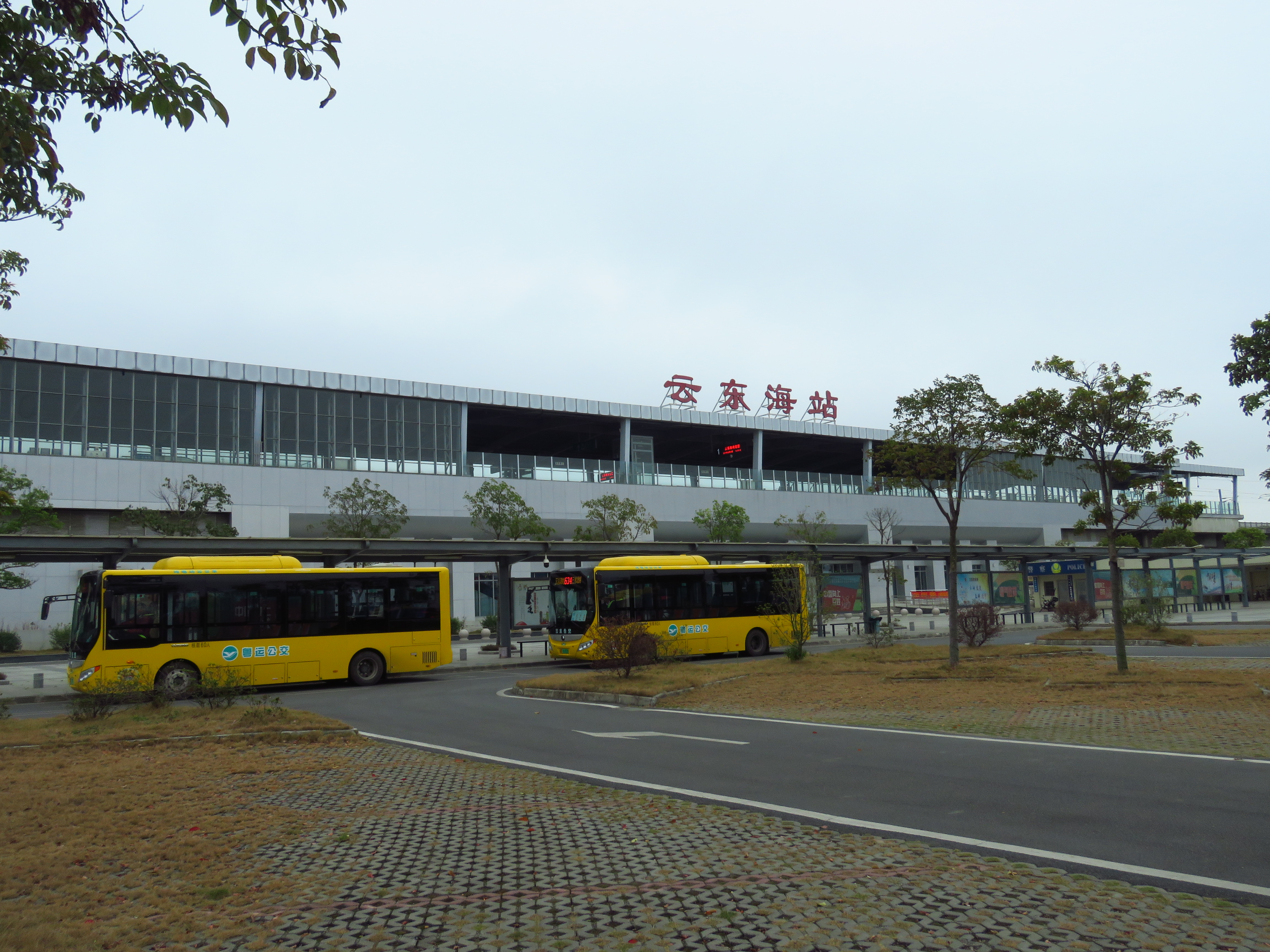
- Exterior

General information
- Location: Yundonghai, Sanshui District, Foshan, Guangdong; China
- Coordinates: 23°13′13.91″N 112°50′26.09″E
- Operated by: Guangdong Intercity
- Line: Guangzhou–Zhaoqing intercity railway
- Platforms: 2 (2 side platforms)
- Tracks: 2

Construction
- Structure type: Elevated
- Accessible: Yes

Other information
- Station code: NAQ (Pinyin: YDH)

History
- Opened: 30 March 2016 (10 years ago)

Services
Preceding station	Pearl River Delta Metropolitan Region Intercity Railway	Following station
Dawang towards Zhaoqing	Guangzhou–Zhaoqing intercity railway	Sanshui North towards Panyu
Location

Yundonghai railway station (Chinese: 云东海站) is a railway station in Yundonghai, Sanshui District, Foshan, Guangdong, China. It is an intermediate station on the Guangzhou–Zhaoqing intercity railway. It opened with the line on 30 March 2016. The station has two side platforms.
