= Shishan North railway station =

Railway station in Foshan, Guangdong

Shishan North 狮山北
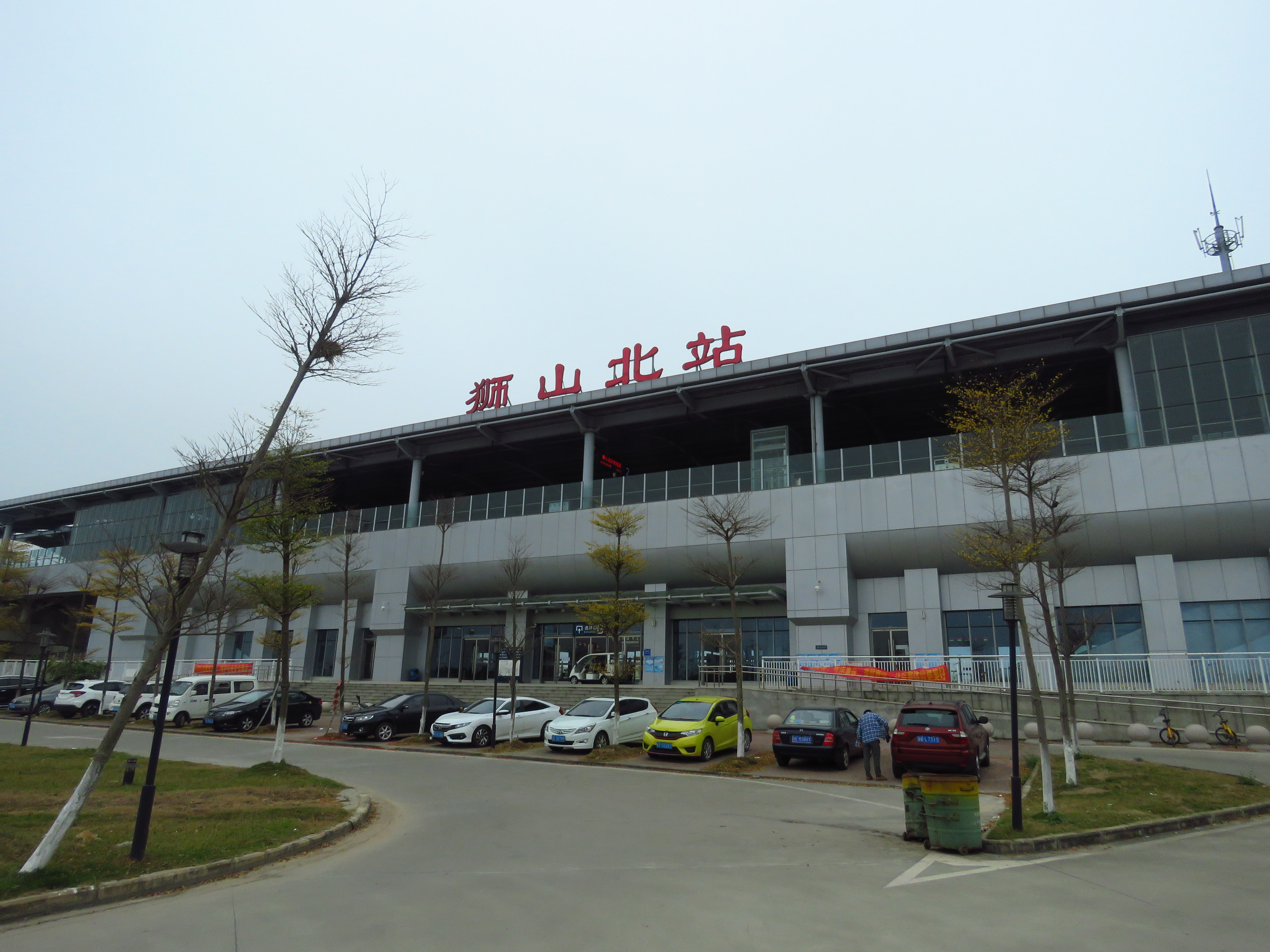
- Exterior

General information
- Location: Shishan, Nanhai District, Foshan, Guangdong; China
- Coordinates: 23°9′22.98″N 112°57′57.70″E
- Operated by: Guangdong Intercity
- Line: Guangzhou–Zhaoqing intercity railway
- Platforms: 2 (2 side platforms)
- Tracks: 2

Construction
- Structure type: Elevated
- Accessible: Yes

Other information
- Station code: NSQ (Pinyin: SSB)

History
- Opened: 30 March 2016 (10 years ago)

Services
Preceding station	Pearl River Delta Metropolitan Region Intercity Railway	Following station
Sanshui North towards Zhaoqing	Guangzhou–Zhaoqing intercity railway	Shishan towards Panyu
Location

Shishan North railway station (Chinese: 狮山北站) is a railway station in Shishan, Nanhai District, Foshan, Guangdong, China. It is an intermediate station on the Guangzhou–Zhaoqing intercity railway. It opened with the line on 30 March 2016. The station has two side platforms.
