= Dinghu East railway station =

Railway station in Zhaoqing, Guangdong

Dinghu East 鼎湖东
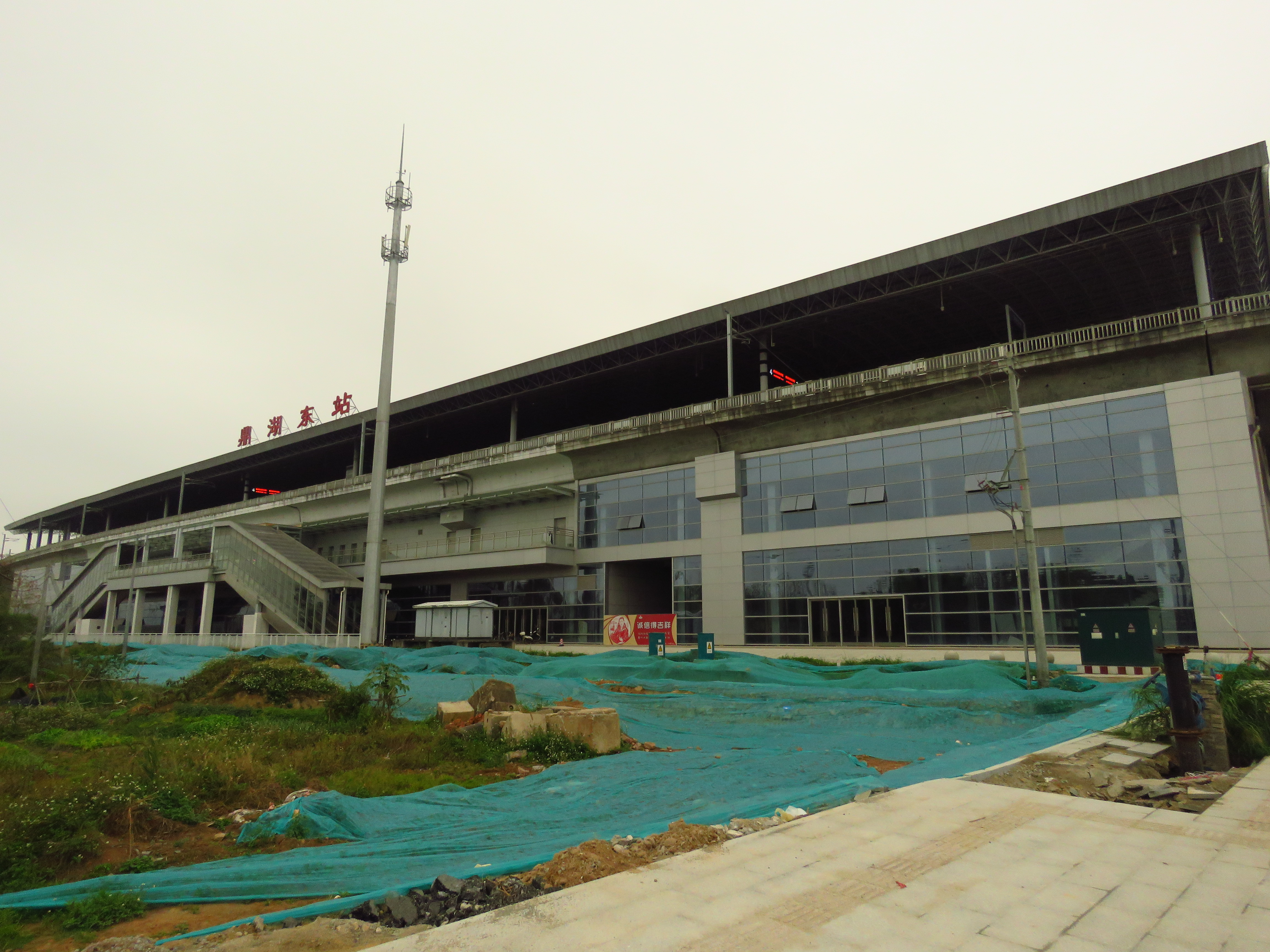
- The station during construction

General information
- Location: Yong'an, Dinghu District, Zhaoqing, Guangdong; China
- Coordinates: 23°12′59.66″N 112°39′18.00″E
- Operated by: Guangdong Intercity
- Line: Guangzhou–Zhaoqing intercity railway
- Platforms: 4 (2 island platforms)
- Tracks: 4

Construction
- Structure type: Elevated
- Accessible: Yes

Other information
- Station code: UWQ (Pinyin: DHD)

History
- Opened: 30 March 2016 (10 years ago)

Services
Preceding station	Pearl River Delta Metropolitan Region Intercity Railway	Following station
Dinghushan towards Zhaoqing	Guangzhou–Zhaoqing intercity railway	Sihui towards Panyu
Location

Dinghu East railway station (Chinese: 鼎湖东站) is a railway station in Yong'an, Dinghu District, Zhaoqing, Guangdong, China. It is an intermediate station on the Guangzhou–Zhaoqing intercity railway. It opened with the line on 30 March 2016. The station has two island platforms. It is situated adjacent and perpendicular to Zhaoqing East railway station and a walkway is provided for transfer between the two stations.
