= Dinghushan railway station =

Railway station in Zhaoqing, Guangdong

Dinghushan 鼎湖山
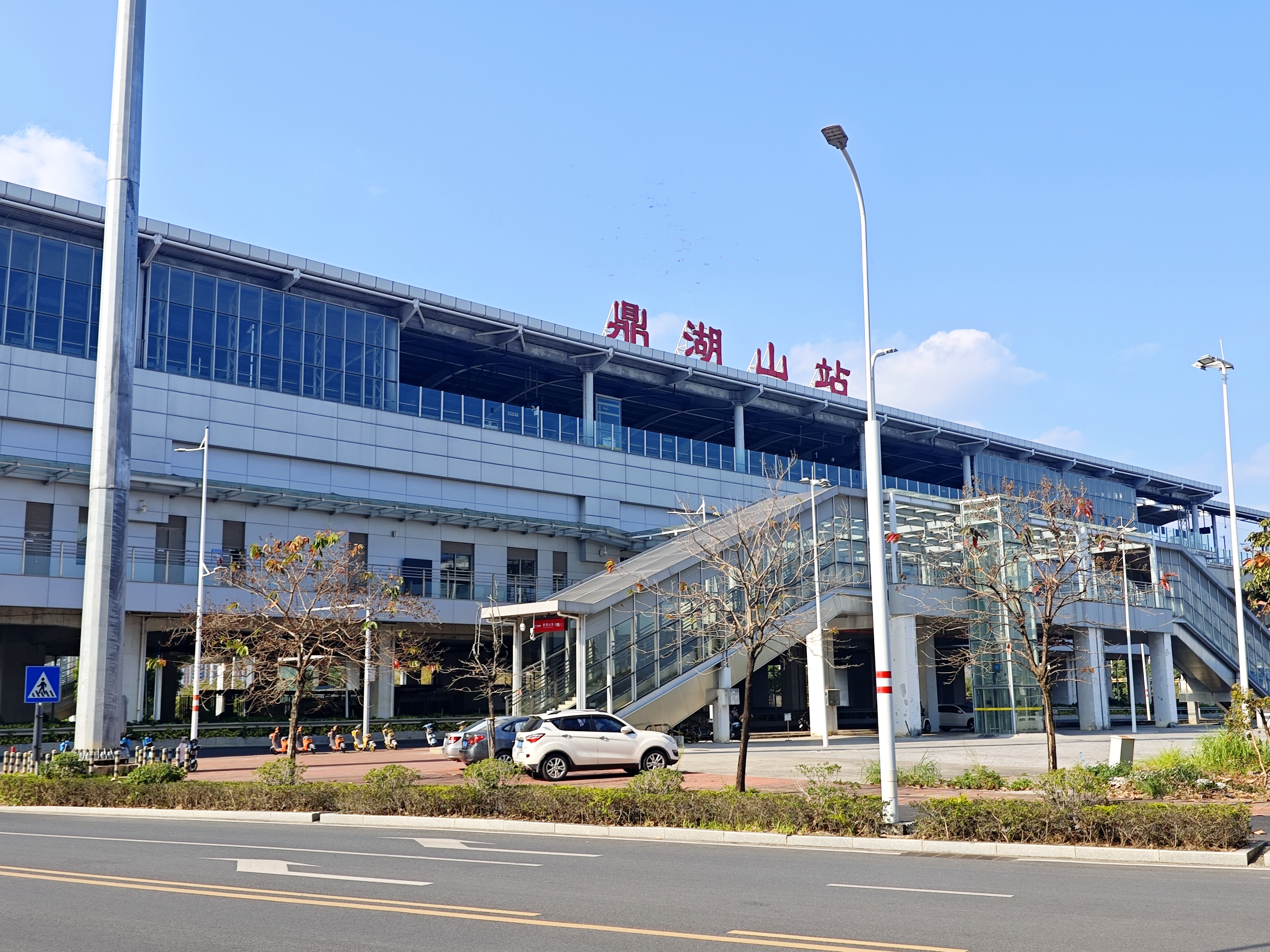
- Exterior

General information
- Location: Dinghu District, Zhaoqing, Guangdong; China
- Coordinates: 23°10′36.37″N 112°34′55.06″E
- Operated by: Guangdong Intercity
- Line: Guangzhou–Zhaoqing intercity railway
- Platforms: 2 (2 side platforms)
- Tracks: 2

Construction
- Structure type: Elevated
- Accessible: Yes

Other information
- Station code: NVQ (Pinyin: DHS)

History
- Opened: 30 March 2016 (10 years ago)

Services
Preceding station	Pearl River Delta Metropolitan Region Intercity Railway	Following station
Duanzhou towards Zhaoqing	Guangzhou–Zhaoqing intercity railway	Dinghu East towards Panyu
Location

Dinghushan railway station (Chinese: 鼎湖山站) is a railway station in Dinghu District, Zhaoqing, Guangdong, China. It is an intermediate station on the Guangzhou–Zhaoqing intercity railway. It opened with the line on 30 March 2016. The station has two side platforms.
