= Sihui railway station =

Railway station in Zhaoqing, Guangdong

Sihui 四会

General information
- Location: Dasha, Sihui, Zhaoqing, Guangdong; China
- Coordinates: 23°16′23.50″N 112°44′58.00″E
- Operated by: Guangdong Intercity
- Line: Guangzhou–Zhaoqing intercity railway
- Platforms: 4 (2 island platforms)
- Tracks: 4

Construction
- Structure type: Elevated
- Accessible: Yes

Other information
- Station code: AHQ (Pinyin: SHU)

History
- Opened: 30 March 2016 (10 years ago)

Services
Preceding station	Pearl River Delta Metropolitan Region Intercity Railway	Following station
Dinghu East towards Zhaoqing	Guangzhou–Zhaoqing intercity railway	Dawang towards Panyu
Location

Sihui railway station (Chinese: 四会站) is a railway station in Dasha, Sihui, Zhaoqing, Guangdong, China. It is an intermediate station on the Guangzhou–Zhaoqing intercity railway. It opened with the line on 30 March 2016. The station has two island platforms. It is situated approximately 10 kilometres (6.2 mi) from central Sihui.
