= Sanshui North railway station =

Railway station in Foshan, Guangdong

Sanshui North 三水北
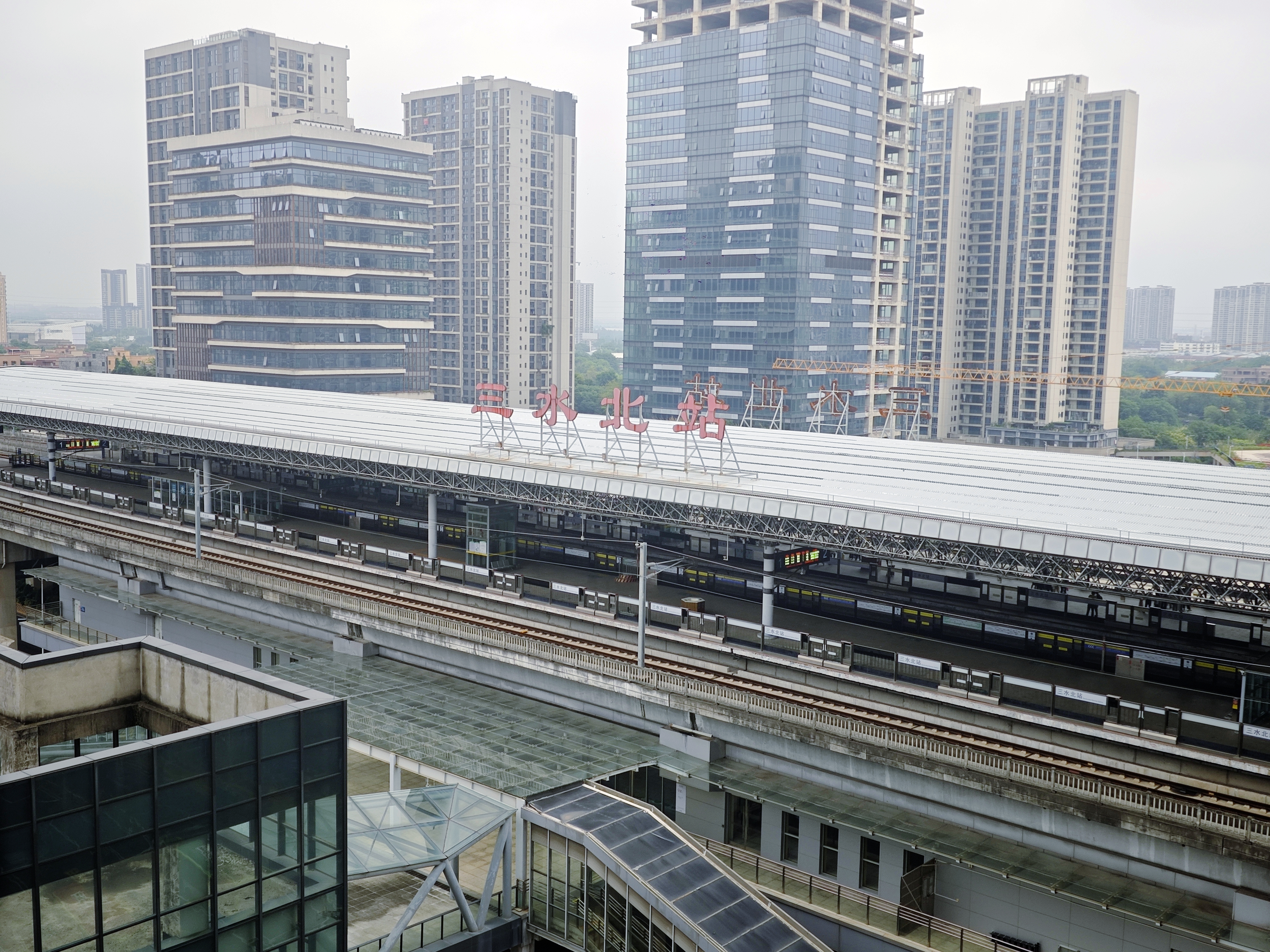
- Exterior

General information
- Location: Sanshui District, Foshan, Guangdong; China
- Coordinates: 23°11′14.80″N 112°54′49.01″E
- Operated by: Guangdong Intercity
- Line: Guangzhou–Zhaoqing intercity railway
- Platforms: 4 (2 island platforms)
- Tracks: 4

Construction
- Structure type: Elevated
- Accessible: Yes

Other information
- Station code: ARQ (Pinyin: SSB)

History
- Opened: 30 March 2016 (10 years ago)

Services
Preceding station	Pearl River Delta Metropolitan Region Intercity Railway	Following station
Yundonghai towards Zhaoqing	Guangzhou–Zhaoqing intercity railway	Shishan North towards Panyu
Location

Sanshui North railway station (Chinese: 三水北站) is a railway station in Sanshui District, Foshan, Guangdong, China. It is an intermediate station on the Guangzhou–Zhaoqing intercity railway. It opened with the line on 30 March 2016. The station has two island platforms.
