= Shishan =

Shishan may refer to:

== Places in China ==
- Shishan, Foshan (Nanhai District, Foshan, Guangdong)
  - Shishan North railway station, Foshan
  - Shishan railway station, Foshan
- Shishan, Nanfeng County, Fuzhou City, Jiangxi Province
