= Dawang railway station =

Railway station in Zhaoqing, Guangdong

Dawang 大旺
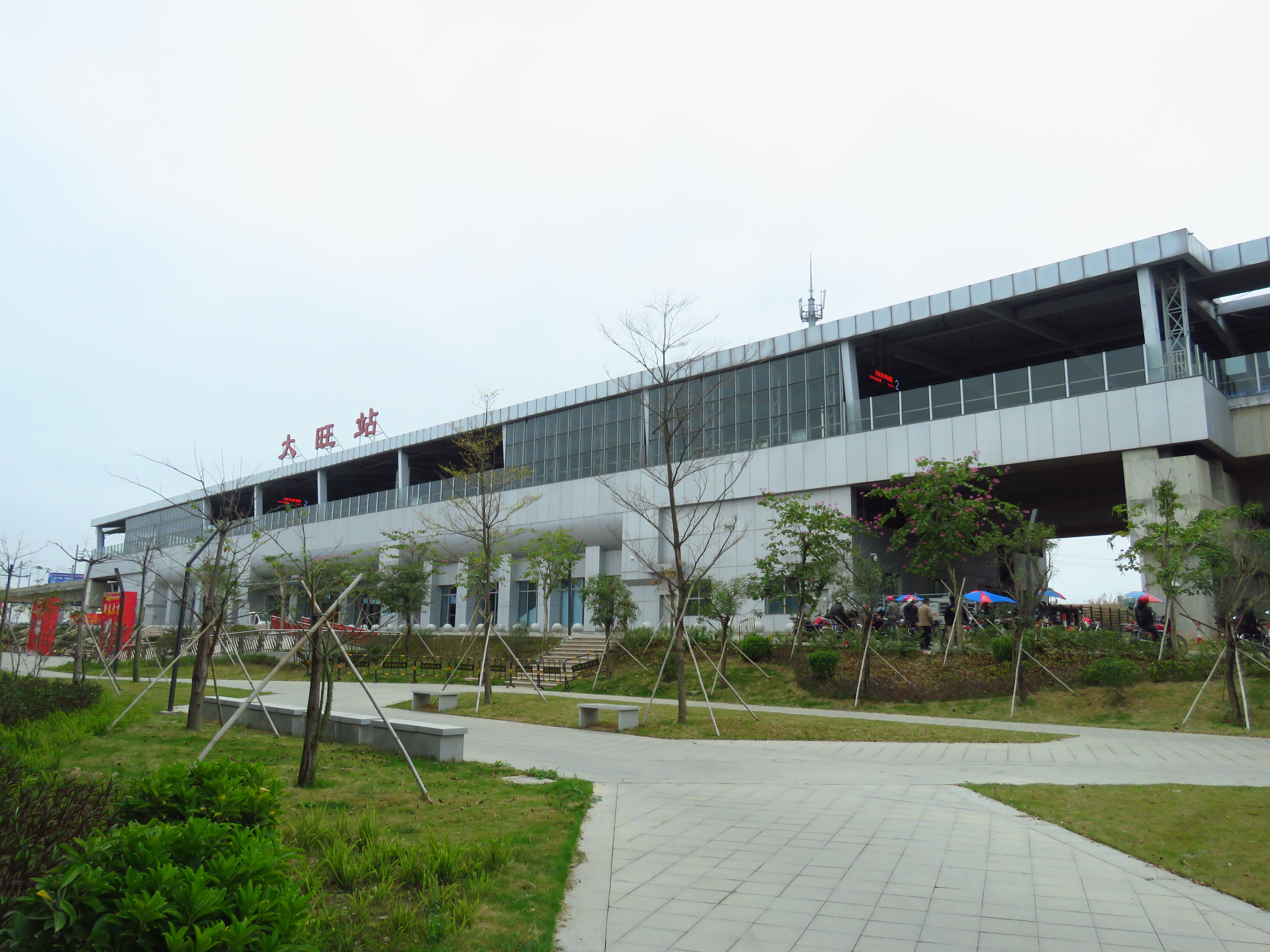
- Exterior

General information
- Location: Sihui, Zhaoqing, Guangdong; China
- Coordinates: 23°15′22.96″N 112°48′25.63″E
- Operated by: Guangdong Intercity
- Line: Guangzhou–Zhaoqing intercity railway
- Platforms: 2 (2 side platforms)
- Tracks: 2

Construction
- Structure type: Elevated
- Accessible: Yes

Other information
- Station code: WWQ (Pinyin: DWA)

History
- Opened: 30 March 2016 (10 years ago)

Services
Preceding station	Pearl River Delta Metropolitan Region Intercity Railway	Following station
Sihui towards Zhaoqing	Guangzhou–Zhaoqing intercity railway	Yundonghai towards Panyu
Location

Dawang railway station (Chinese: 大旺站) is a railway station in Sihui, Zhaoqing, Guangdong, China. It is an intermediate station on the Guangzhou–Zhaoqing intercity railway. It opened with the line on 30 March 2016. The station has two side platforms.
