= Duanzhou railway station =

Railway station in Zhaoqing, Guangdong

Duanzhou 端州
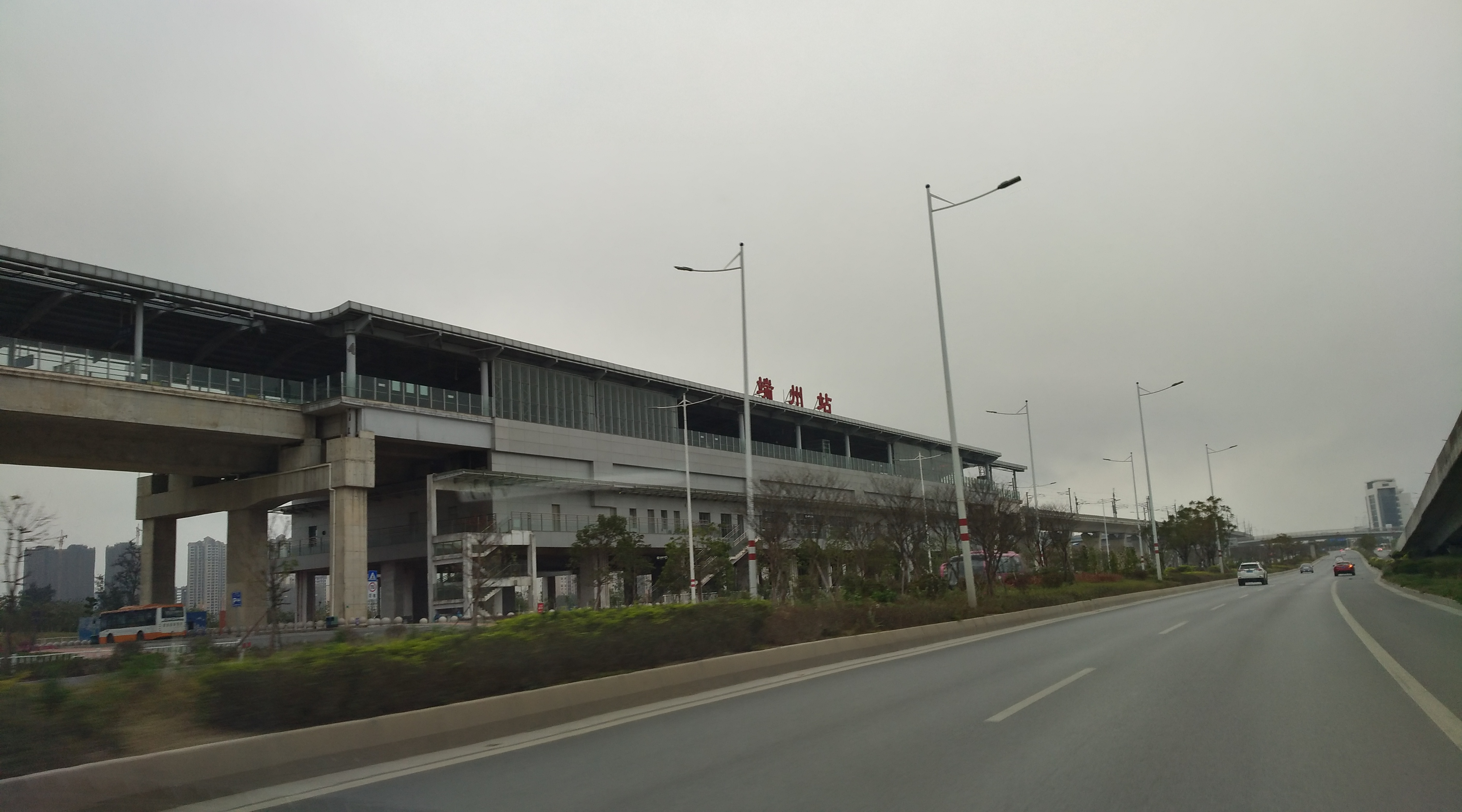
- Exterior

General information
- Location: Duanzhou District, Zhaoqing, Guangdong; China
- Coordinates: 23°6′48.75″N 112°30′30.29″E
- Operated by: Guangdong Intercity
- Line: Guangzhou–Zhaoqing intercity railway
- Platforms: 2 (2 side platforms)
- Tracks: 2

Construction
- Structure type: Elevated
- Accessible: Yes

Other information
- Station code: WZQ (Pinyin: DZH)

History
- Opened: 30 March 2016 (10 years ago)

Services
Preceding station	Pearl River Delta Metropolitan Region Intercity Railway	Following station
Zhaoqing Terminus	Guangzhou–Zhaoqing intercity railway	Dinghushan towards Panyu
Location

Duanzhou railway station (Chinese: 端州站) is a railway station in Duanzhou District, Zhaoqing, Guangdong, China. It is an intermediate station on the Guangzhou–Zhaoqing intercity railway. It opened with the line on 30 March 2016. The station has two side platforms.
