= Foshan West railway station =

Railway station in Foshan, China

Foshanxi 佛山西
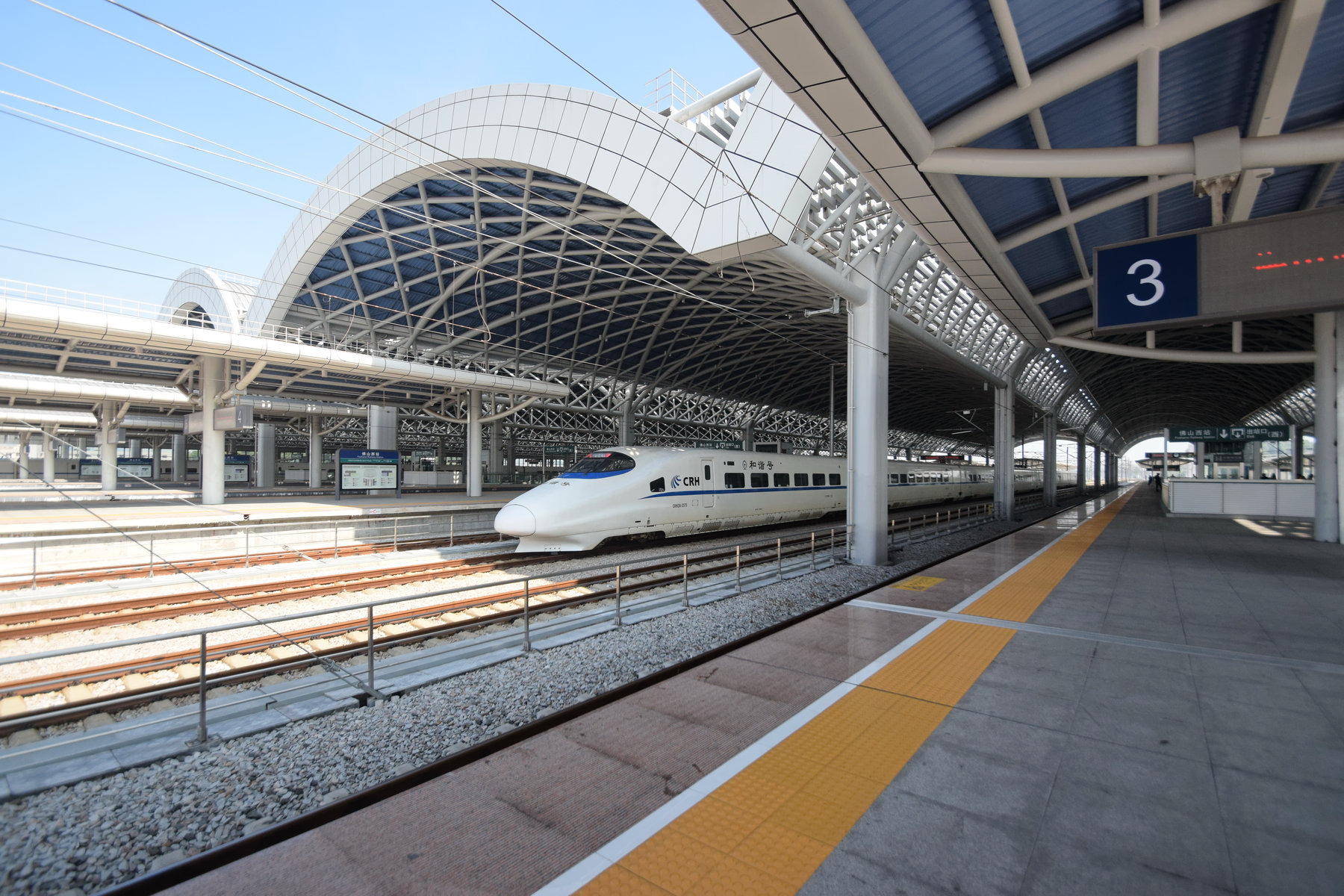
- Platform 3

General information
- Other names: Foshan West
- Location: China
- Coordinates: 23°04′55″N 113°01′41″E
- Lines: Nanning–Guangzhou high-speed railway; Guiyang–Guangzhou high-speed railway; Guangzhou–Foshan circular intercity railway (Southern Ring section); Guangzhou–Zhaoqing intercity railway
- Platforms: 11 (5 island platforms and 1 side platform)
- Tracks: 23
- Connections: 3 Foshan West Railway Station; Bus terminal

Construction
- Structure type: Elevated
- Accessible: Yes

Other information
- Station code: FOQ (Pinyin: FSX)

History
- Opened: 18 August 2017 (9 years ago)

Services
Preceding station	China Railway High-speed	Following station
Sanshui South towards Nanning	Nanning–Guangzhou high-speed railway	Guangzhou South Terminus
Sanshui South towards Guiyang North	Guiyang–Guangzhou high-speed railway	Guangzhou South Terminus
Preceding station	Pearl River Delta Metropolitan Region Intercity Railway	Following station
Shishan towards Zhaoqing	Guangzhou–Zhaoqing intercity railway	Zhangcha towards Panyu
Future services
Zhangcha towards Huadu	Guangzhou–Foshan circular intercity railway	Shishan East towards Huadu
Location

Foshan West railway station is a major railway station located in Nanhai District, Foshan, Guangdong, China. The station started construction on 26 February 2013 and was opened on 18 August 2017. The station serves as a gateway for conventional, regional and high-speed rail services for southwest Guangdong, serviced by the Nanning–Guangzhou and Guiyang–Guangzhou high speed railways.

This station connects to Line 3 of the Foshan Metro, which opened on 23 August 2024.

== See also ==
- Foshan railway station
