= Dawang =

Dawang may refer to:

- Dawang railway station, in Guangdong, China
- Dawang Lu station, of the Beijing Subway station in Beijing, China

== See also ==
Tawang, a town in Arunachal Pradesh, India
