= Beijiao railway station =

Railway station in Beijiao, China

Coordinates: 22.9179°N 113.2584°E

Beijiao 北滘
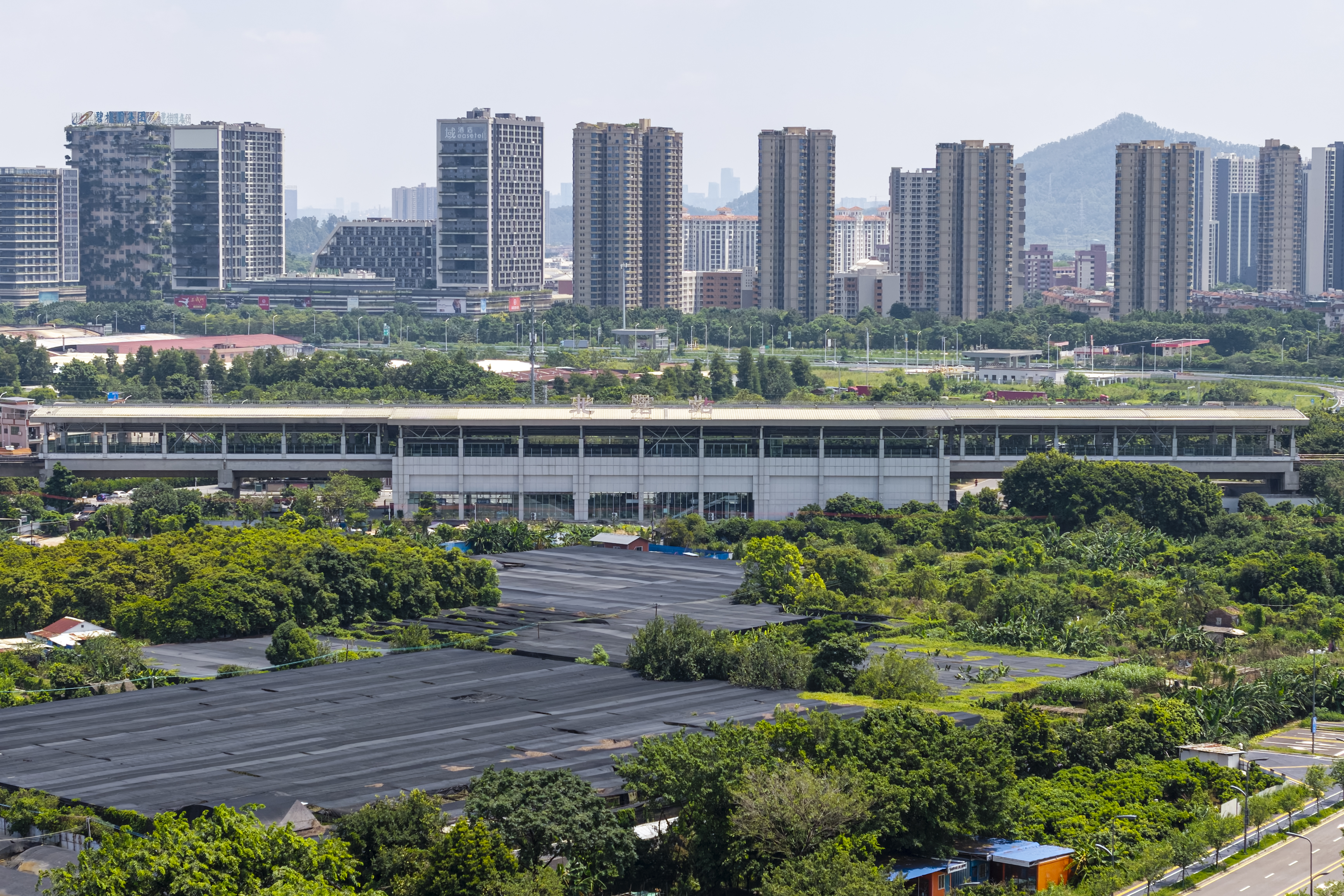
- Exterior

General information
- Location: Taocun Village, Beijiao Town, Shunde District, Foshan, Guangdong; China
- Owner: Guangdong Guangzhu Intercity Rail Transit
- Line: Guangzhou–Zhuhai intercity railway

History
- Opened: 7 January 2011

Services
Preceding station	Pearl River Delta Metropolitan Region Intercity Railway	Following station
Guangzhou South Terminus	Guangzhou–Zhuhai intercity railway	Shunde towards Zhuhai

Former services
Preceding station	Pearl River Delta Metropolitan Region Intercity Railway	Following station
Bijiang towards Guangzhou South	Guangzhou–Zhuhai intercity railway Suspended 2020	Shunde towards Zhuhai
Location

Beijiao railway station (Chinese: 北滘站), is an elevated station of the Guangzhou-Zhuhai Intercity Railway.

The station is located at Taocun Village (Chinese: 桃村), Beijiao Town in Shunde District, Foshan, Guangdong, China, the west of Bigui Lu (Chinese: 碧桂路) and the east of Sanle Lu (Chinese: 三乐路). It is away from Beijiao Town Centre with few road infrastructure facilities nearby. Roads will be constructed to connect to the station to cope with the needs of the neighbouring Panyu District. It started operations on 7 January 2011.
