= Guangzhou–Zhaoqing intercity railway =

Railway line in China

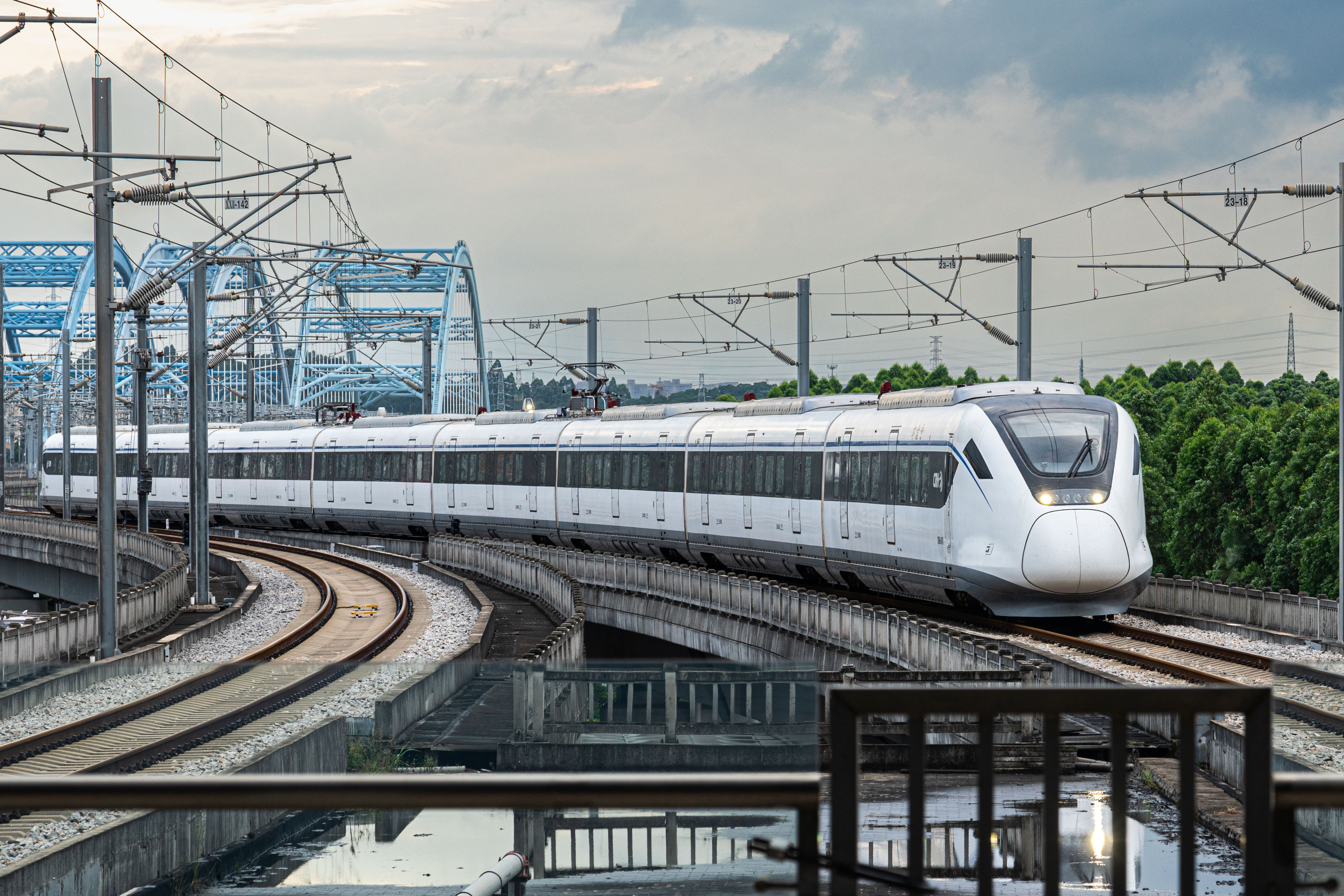
- A CRH6A train entering Foshan West railway station

Overview
- Native name: 广肇城际铁路
- Status: Operational
- Locale: Guangdong province: Guangzhou; Foshan; Zhaoqing
- Termini: Zhaoqing; Panyu
- Stations: 16

Service
- Type: Higher-speed/regional rail
- System: Pearl River Delta Metropolitan Region intercity railway
- Services: 1
- Operator(s): CR Guangzhou (until 23 January 2024); Guangdong Intercity (since 23 January 2024)
- Rolling stock: CRH6

History
- Opened: 30 March 2016; 10 years ago

Technical
- Line length: 117.68 km (73 mi)
- Track gauge: 1,435 mm (4 ft 8 1/2 in) standard gauge
- Electrification: 25 kV 50 Hz AC (Overhead line)
- Operating speed: 200 km/h (124 mph)

Guangzhou–Zhaoqing intercity railway, also known as Guangzhao intercity railway or Foshan–Zhaoqing intercity railway, is a regional railway within Guangdong province, China. It connects between Foshan and Zhaoqing, with through trains to Guangzhou, the capital of Guangdong province. It is a part of the Pearl River Delta Metropolitan Region intercity railway network. It commenced operations on March 30, 2016.

== Overview ==
From Guangzhou to Foshan, the line is 53 km (33 mi) long, and it continues for another 112.9 km (70.2 mi) to Zhaoqing. Between Guangzhou and Foshan, the line has a westerly heading. From Foshan West railway station, the line continues west through Shishan Town in Nanhai District, across Shishan Industrial Park, over the Guangzhou–Zhuhai railway and entering Sanshui District. The line then crosses the Bei River and passes through the Zhaoqing High-tech Industrial Development Zone. The line then turns southwest, crossing the Sui river, the Guangzhou–Maoming Railway and State Road 321, and passes through Dinghu District before reaching Zhaoqing. The line has 19 stations, 8 between Guangzhou and Foshan, and 11 between Foshan and Zhaoqing. The line is connected to the Guiyang–Guangzhou high-speed railway and the Nanning–Guangzhou high-speed railway. The operational speed on the line is 200 km/h (124 mph).

== History ==
Construction of the Foshan and Sanshui segments of the line started on September 29, 2009 and June 18, 2010 respectively. As of April 20, 2011, the planned terminus was tentatively set at Dachong railway station.

On March 8, 2012 the line was renamed from "Foshan–Zhaoqing intercity railway" to "Guangzhou–Zhaoqing intercity railway". Plans for the line were also revised to extend the line to Guangzhou South railway station.

In July 2012, the plans were revised yet again, with the line being extended to Zhaoqing railway station. The route for this section was determined by September 2012.

Construction of the Dachong elevated viaduct started on December 18, 2012, and construction of the Guangzhou-Foshan segment of the line started in 2013. The line commenced operations on March 30, 2016.

On 10 April 2021, service patterns were changed and through running between Zhaoqing and Shenzhen Airport was introduced.

On 11 October 2023, due to construction of Guangzhan HSR, service pattern has been shorten back to serve between Zhaoqing and Foshan West.

On 1 November 2023, Guangdong Intercity got operation license of Guangzhao intercity railway. Takeover of operations completed in 23 January 2024.

On 22 May 2024, Guangdong Intercity further got operation license of section between Foshan West and Panyu. This section is opened for service on 26 May.

== Stations ==
- The line shares tracks with the Guangfo Circular intercity railway between Panyu and Foshan West.

Station №	Station Name		Distance km		PRD MIR (CR C-train) transfers/connections	Metro transfers/connections	Location
Station №	English	Chinese	Distance km		PRD MIR (CR C-train) transfers/connections	Metro transfers/connections	Location
↑ through train to Guangzhou–Huizhou intercity railway GH and Guangzhou East Ring intercity railway ER
PYA	Panyu	番禺	0.00	0.00	ER (through service); IZQ Guangzhu	2 7 22; 2 (Guangzhou South)	Panyu, Guangzhou
CVA	Chencun	陈村	3.92	3.92	GFC	7	Shunde, Foshan
BJA	Beijiao West (Beijiaoxi)	北滘西	6.63	10.55	GFC	3	Shunde, Foshan
SVA	Shunde North (Shundebei)	顺德北	5.21	15.76	GFC	Guangfo 3 (Dongping)	Shunde, Foshan
ZAA	Zhangcha	张槎	9.48	25.24	GFC	2	Chancheng, Foshan
FOQ	Foshan West (Foshanxi)	佛山西	11.18	36.42	GFC	3 4	Nanhai, Foshan
KSQ	Shishan	狮山	8.10	44.52			Nanhai, Foshan
NSQ	Shishan North (Shishanbei)	狮山北	3.75	48.27			Nanhai, Foshan
ARQ	Sanshui North (Sanshuibei)	三水北	6.37	54.64			Sanshui, Foshan
NAQ	Yundonghai	云东海	11.17	65.81			Sanshui, Foshan
WWQ	Dawang	大旺	5.93	71.74			Gaoyao, Zhaoqing
AHQ	Sihui	四会	6.33	78.07			Sihui, Zhaoqing
UWQ	Dinghu East (Dinghudong)	鼎湖东	12.28	90.35			Dinghu, Zhaoqing
NVQ	Dinghushan	鼎湖山	9.13	99.48			Dinghu, Zhaoqing
WZQ	Duanzhou	端州	10.70	110.18			Duanzhou, Zhaoqing
ZVQ	Zhaoqing	肇庆	7.50	117.68			Duanzhou, Zhaoqing
