= Jianlibao Group =

Chinese drinks company

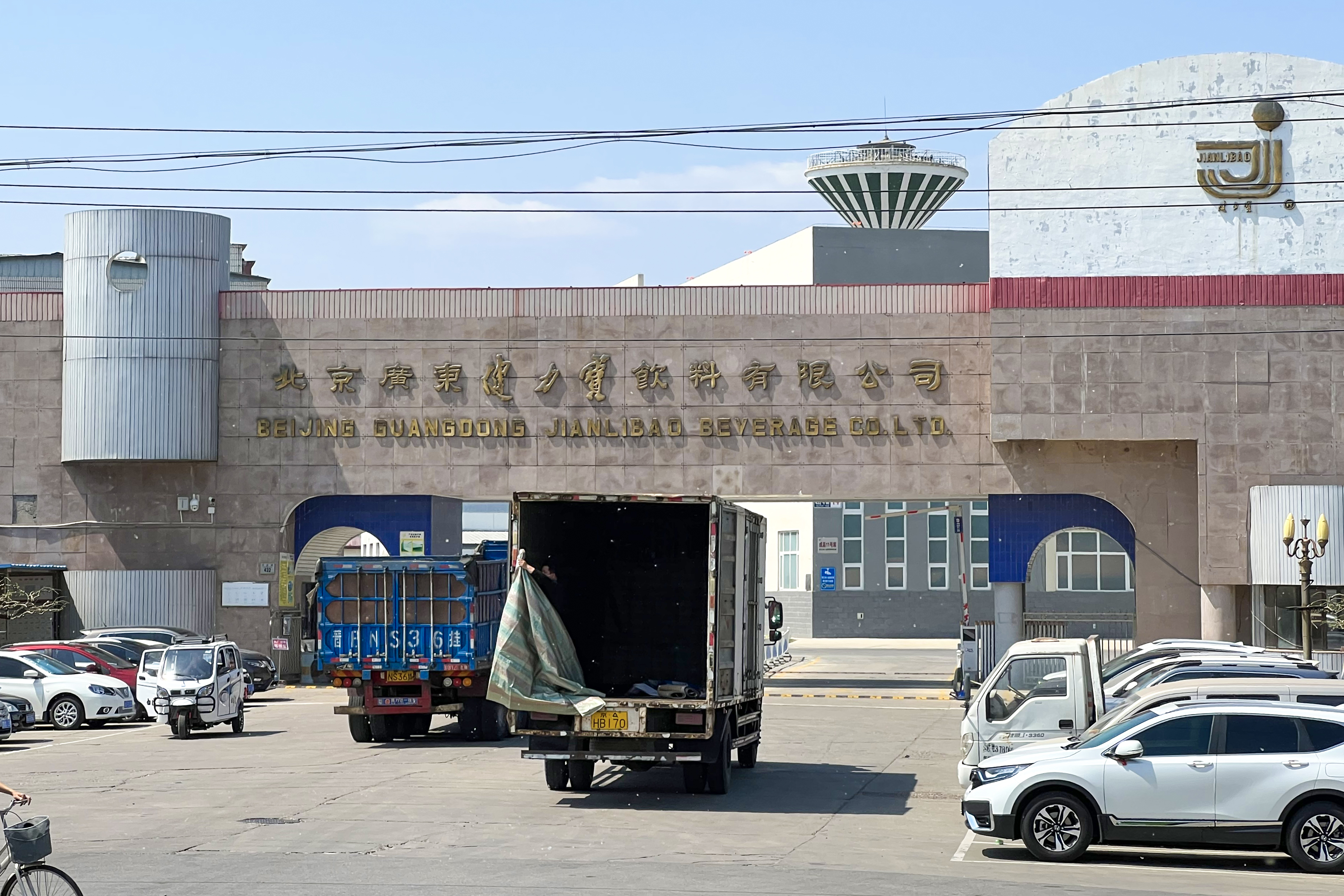
Beijing branch

Jianlibao Group (Chinese: 健力宝集团) is a soft drink producer based in Foshan, Guangdong, China which was established in 1984. In the 1990s, The Jianlibao drink was one of the best sellers in China, at par with Coca-Cola and Pepsi. However, poor management and stiff competition led to a total debt of more than 1 billion Renminbi yuan (US$121 million) in 2005.

Under Zhanghai, Jianlibao was the sponsor of the Shenzhen Jianlibao football club between 2002 and 2005, who won the Chinese Super League title in 2004.

== Related People ==
- Li Jingwei (李经纬): he had been the director of Foshan Sanshui Distillery since 1984. On November 9, 2011, he was sentenced to 15 years' imprisonment by the Intermediate people's Court of Foshan City, Guangdong Province, for embezzlement and confiscated 150000 yuan of personal property. He died of illness in Sanshui on April 22, 2013.
- Zhang Hai (张海): chairman and president of Jianlibao from 2002 to 2004, he was arrested on March 24, 2005. In February 2007, he was sentenced to 15 years' imprisonment by the Foshan Intermediate people's Court on charges of embezzlement and misappropriation of funds. In September 2008, the second trial was commuted to 10 years' imprisonment. In early 2011, he was released from prison ahead of time for falsifying "meritorious service" materials, and then fled abroad.

== Jianlibao Youth Football Team ==
On April 25, 1992, the Chinese Football Association and Jianlibao Group signed an agreement to formally put the establishment of Jianlibao Youth Football Team on the agenda. In the same year, young athletes from 1977 to 1978 were selected in Tianjin and Dalian. More than 80 selected people went to Beijing for the second round of screening, and then more than 40 people were selected for winter training and final selection in Wuzhou. The final 22 people went to Beijing in 1993 and flew from Beijing to Sao Paulo, Brazil in November.
