= Xinan Subdistrict, Foshan =

Coordinates: 23.1654°N 112.8926°E

Xinan Subdistrict 西南街道
- Subdistrict

Chinese transcription(s)
- Interactive map of Xinan Subdistrict
- Country: China
- Province: Guangdong
- Prefecture: Foshan
- District: Sanshui
- Time zone: UTC+8 (China Standard Time)

Xinan (Chinese: 西南街道; pinyin: Xīnán Jiēdào) is a subdistrict of the Sanshui District, Foshan, Guangdong, China.

== See also ==
- List of township-level divisions of Guangdong
