= Sanshui, Foshan =

Sanshui 三水区
- District
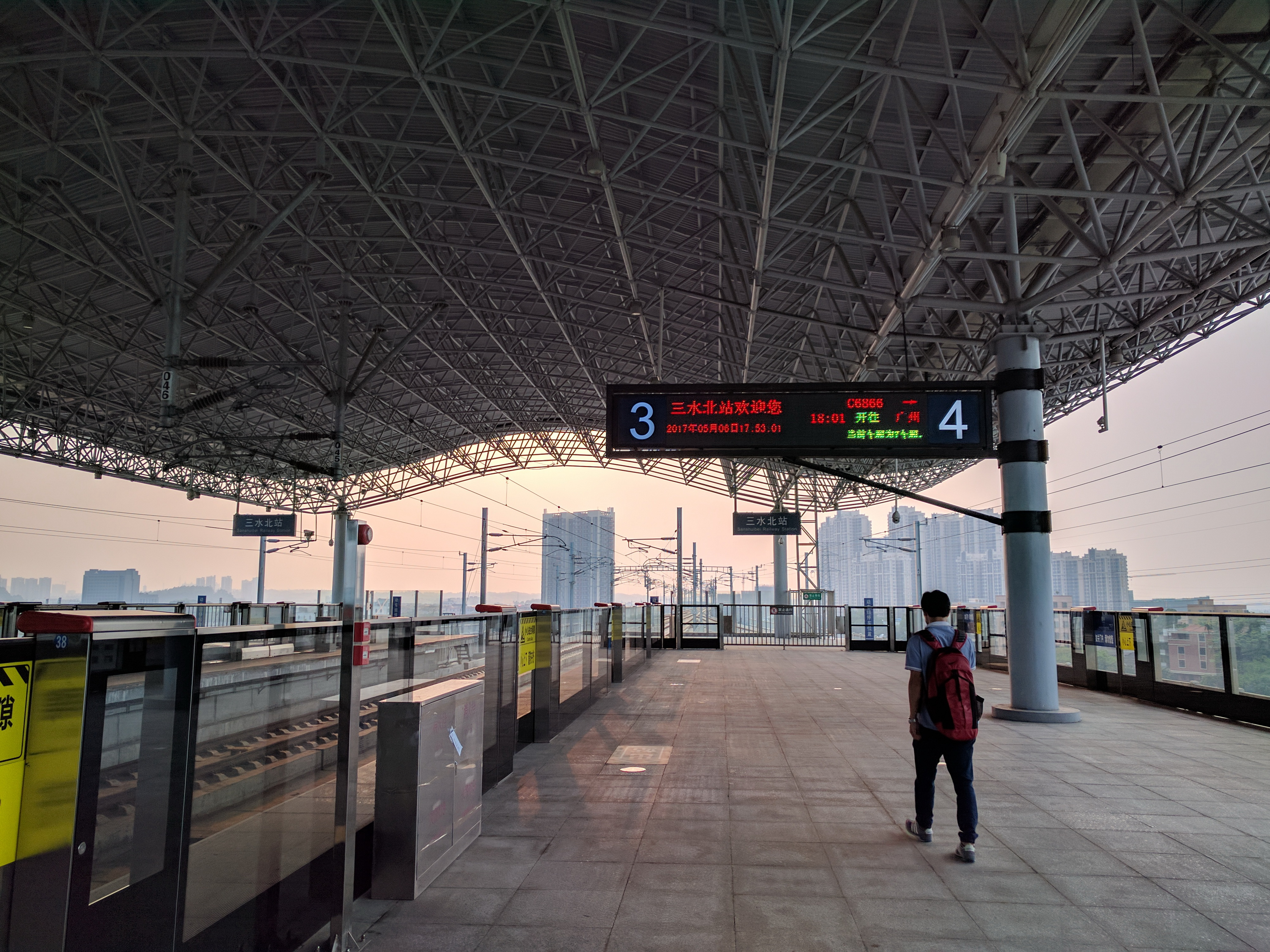
- Sanshui North railway station

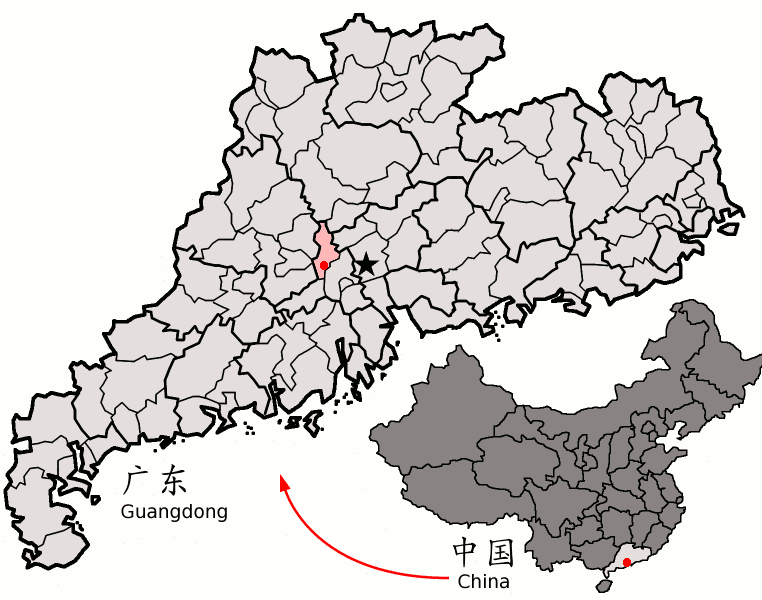
- Location of Sanshui District (red) in Foshan City and Guangdong
- Coordinates: 23°09′21″N 112°53′48″E
- Country: People's Republic of China
- Province: Guangdong
- Prefecture-level city: Foshan

Area
  - Total: 874 km^{2} (337 sq mi)
- Elevation: 11 m (36 ft)

Population (2020)
  - Total: 803,226
  - Density: 970/km^{2} (2,500/sq mi)
- Time zone: UTC+8 (China Standard)
- Postal code: 528100
- Area code: 0757
- Licence plate prefix: 粤 E
- Website: https://www.ss.gov.cn/

Sanshui, Foshan
- Chinese: 三水
- Jyutping: Saam1-seoi2
- Cantonese Yale: Sāamséui
- Hanyu Pinyin: Sānshǔi
- Postal: Samshui
- Literal meaning: Three Waters; Tri-River
Transcriptions
Standard Mandarin
- Hanyu Pinyin: Sānshǔi
Yue: Cantonese
- Yale Romanization: Sāamséui
- Jyutping: Saam1-seoi2

Sanshui District, formerly romanized as Samsui or Samshui, (Note: Also formerly romanized as San-shwuy Heen.) (Jyutping: Saam^{1} seoi^{2}), is an urban district of the prefecture-level city of Foshan in Guangdong province, China. It had a population of 803,226 as of the 2020 census. It is known for the "Samsui women", emigrants who labour in Singapore, and for a large fireworks explosion in 2008.

== History ==
According to archaeology sites discovered within the region, there were human beings inhabited in the today town of Baini (白坭鎮) Sanshui District about four thousand years ago. Sanshui County was established in the fifth year of Jiajing (1526) in the Ming Dynasty. It was temporarily merged into Nanhai County in 1959, revoked and restored in 1960, and reorganized into a county-level city in 1993. In 2002, it was reorganized into a district and belonged to Foshan City.

In February 2008, twenty fireworks warehouses exploded in Sanshui. In total, over 15,000 cartons of fireworks were set off over a period of 24 hours. The loss of inventory was extensive enough that U.S. markets faced real shortages of supply.

== Administration divisions ==
The neighbouring cities, counties and districts are Gaoyao, Dinghu District and Sihui in the west, Qingxin County and Qingyuan in the north, Huadu District and Nanhai District in the east and Gaoming District in the south-west. Sanshui administers 2 subdistricts and 5 towns:

Name	Chinese (S)	Hanyu Pinyin	Population (2020)	Area (km^{2})
Xinan Subdistrict	西南街道	Xīnán Jiēdào	327,518	178.00
Yundonghai Subdistrict	云东海街道	Yúndōnghǎi Jiēdào	98,702	56.00
Lubao town	芦苞镇	Lúbāo Zhèn	46,169	105.00
Datang town	大塘镇	Dàtáng Zhèn	64,968	98.23
Leping town	乐平镇	Lèpíng Zhèn	179,081	198.50
Baini town	白坭镇	Báiní Zhèn	64,408	66.46
Nanshan town	南山镇	Nánshān Zhèn	24,380	115.62

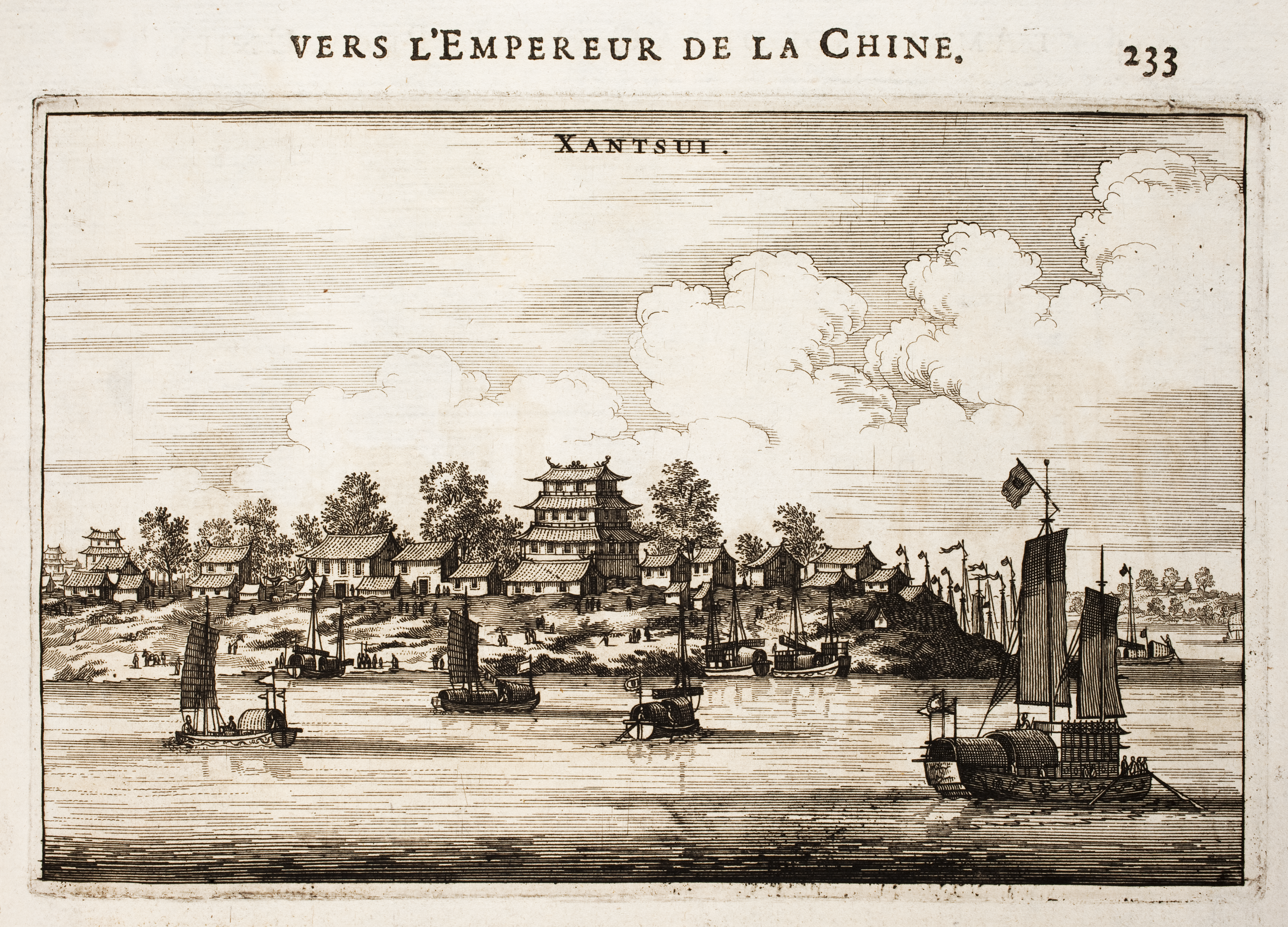
"Xantshui", from Johan Nieuhof (1618–1672); Jean-Baptiste Le Carpentier (1606-ca. 1670): L'ambassade de la Compagnie Orientale des Provinces Unies vers l'Empereur de la Chine, 1665

== Economy ==
Oil, coal, and slate are found in the surrounding area. However, Sanshui is also an important producer of food for Guangdong Province, especially fruit. The mainstay of the former city's economy was the Jianlibao Company, which produced a soft drink made from oranges and honey.

The Budweiser Foshan Production Base in Sanshui District is a key AB InBev brewing facility in China. Established in the early 2000s, this modern brewery produces Budweiser products for the South China market. It represents significant foreign investment in the region, provides local employment, and contributes substantially to Sanshui's industrial economy.

The Red Bull Sanshui Factory manufactures the popular energy drink for distribution throughout southern China. This modern facility has created local jobs and strengthened Sanshui's position in the beverage manufacturing sector. As a prominent international brand operating in the district, Red Bull has contributed to Sanshui's economic development and industrial diversification.

While Sanshui District is geographically integrated within the Greater Bay Area region, its wage levels remain moderate compared to core urban centers. According to the 2024 Guangdong Provincial Minimum Wage Standards (粤人社规[2023]25号), Foshan's monthly minimum wage stands at 1,900 RMB (Class II area), with hourly rates at 18.1 RMB for non-full-time employment.

== Transportation ==
Sanshui is on the railway line from Guangzhou to Maoming. The district is served by G15 Shenyang–Haikou Expressway (which provides access to Kaiping and the southern suburbs of Foshan), G55 Erenhot–Guangzhou Expressway (which provides direct access to downtown Guangzhou), China National Highway 321 (which provides access to Zhaoqing) and China National Highway 324.

Sanshui District is witnessing transformative transportation upgrades, most notably the Foshan Metro Line 4 currently under construction. This critical infrastructure, with its elevated section traversing Sanshui's urban core (including Xiqing Boulevard and Sanshui Hospital stations), is progressing toward its scheduled 2026 operational target as outlined in the Foshan Rail Transit Phase II Construction Plan (2021-2026).

== Climate ==
Climate data for Sanshui, elevation 24 m (79 ft), (1991–2020 normals, extremes 1957–present)
Month	Jan	Feb	Mar	Apr	May	Jun	Jul	Aug	Sep	Oct	Nov	Dec	Year
Record high °C (°F)	27.2 (81.0)	29.0 (84.2)	32.2 (90.0)	34.6 (94.3)	35.5 (95.9)	37.4 (99.3)	39.1 (102.4)	38.7 (101.7)	37.7 (99.9)	36.2 (97.2)	32.7 (90.9)	28.8 (83.8)	39.1 (102.4)
Mean daily maximum °C (°F)	17.3 (63.1)	19.5 (67.1)	21.7 (71.1)	26.0 (78.8)	30.2 (86.4)	32.4 (90.3)	33.7 (92.7)	33.5 (92.3)	32.1 (89.8)	28.9 (84.0)	24.4 (75.9)	19.2 (66.6)	26.6 (79.8)
Daily mean °C (°F)	13.3 (55.9)	15.5 (59.9)	18.2 (64.8)	22.4 (72.3)	26.2 (79.2)	28.3 (82.9)	29.4 (84.9)	29.1 (84.4)	27.9 (82.2)	24.8 (76.6)	20.1 (68.2)	14.9 (58.8)	22.5 (72.5)
Mean daily minimum °C (°F)	10.5 (50.9)	12.7 (54.9)	15.6 (60.1)	19.6 (67.3)	23.4 (74.1)	25.6 (78.1)	26.3 (79.3)	26.0 (78.8)	24.9 (76.8)	21.6 (70.9)	17.1 (62.8)	11.9 (53.4)	19.6 (67.3)
Record low °C (°F)	1.3 (34.3)	−0.7 (30.7)	3.1 (37.6)	8.7 (47.7)	14.4 (57.9)	18.5 (65.3)	21.6 (70.9)	22.8 (73.0)	15.8 (60.4)	10.6 (51.1)	4.1 (39.4)	0.3 (32.5)	−0.7 (30.7)
Average precipitation mm (inches)	53.1 (2.09)	53.1 (2.09)	103.2 (4.06)	183.5 (7.22)	258.6 (10.18)	291.6 (11.48)	218.9 (8.62)	246.9 (9.72)	174.3 (6.86)	71.9 (2.83)	43.5 (1.71)	38.7 (1.52)	1,737.3 (68.38)
Average precipitation days (≥ 0.1 mm)	7.6	10.2	15.7	15.7	18.1	18.9	17.0	15.8	11.8	5.4	5.6	5.4	147.2
Average snowy days	0.1	0	0	0	0	0	0	0	0	0	0	0	0.1
Average relative humidity (%)	72	77	81	81	81	81	78	78	75	69	68	67	76
Mean monthly sunshine hours	98.1	71.7	55.1	69.6	109.4	131.8	182.4	176.4	169.8	177.7	148.8	134.4	1,525.2
Percentage possible sunshine	29	22	15	18	27	33	44	44	47	50	45	41	35
Source: China Meteorological Administrationall-time extreme temperatureall-time October record
