= Shishan, Foshan =

Town in Nanhai District, Foshan, Guangdong, China

Coordinates: 23.12479°N 113.00229°E

Shishan Town (Chinese: 狮山镇) is a town in Nanhai District, Foshan, Guangdong, China.

== Transport ==
- Shishan railway station
