= Zhaoqing railway station =

Railway station in Zhaoqing, Guangdong, China

Zhaoqing 肇庆
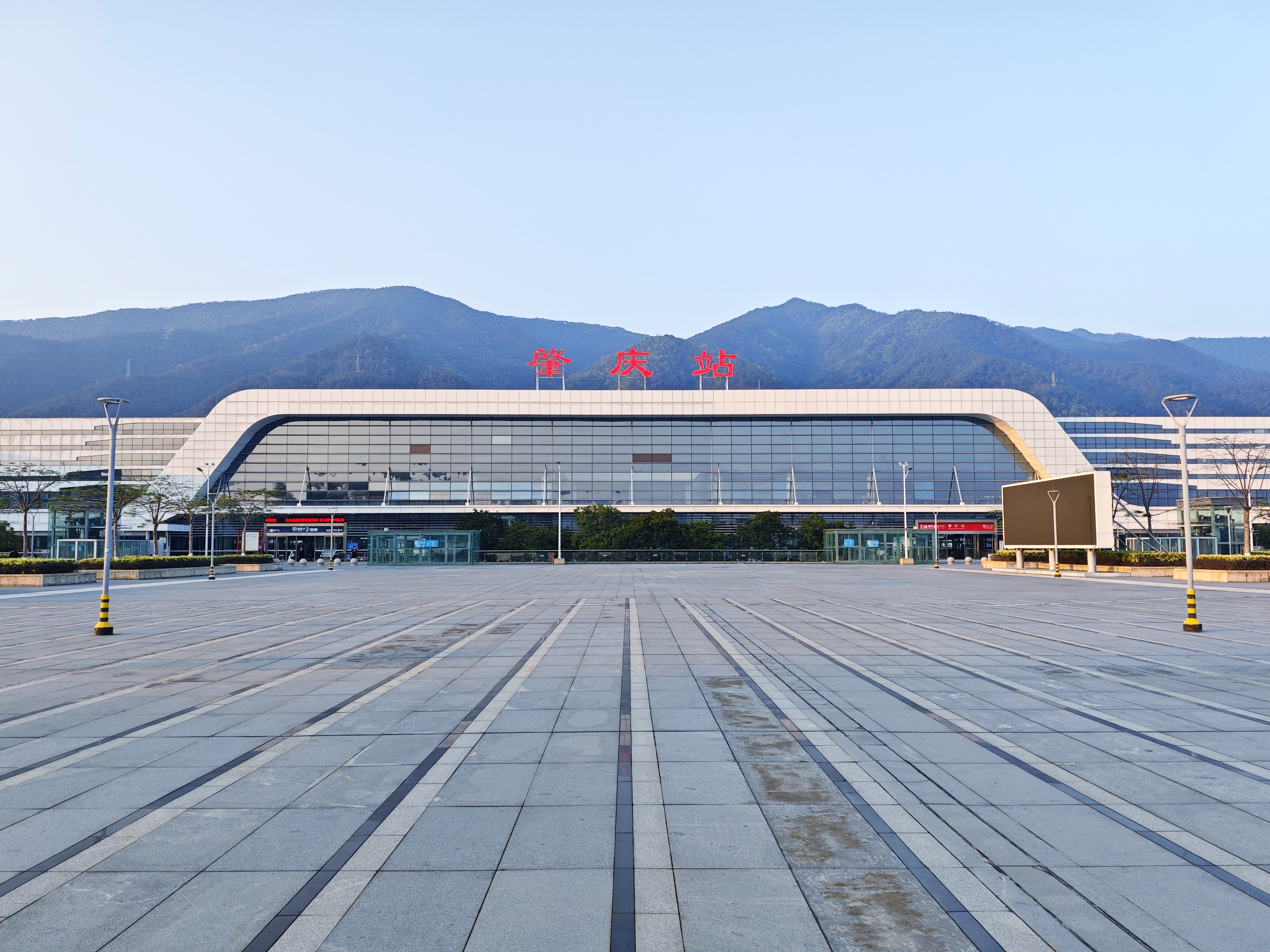
- Zhaoqing railway station

General information
- Location: Duanzhou District, Zhaoqing, Guangdong; China
- Coordinates: 23°05′04″N 112°26′40″E
- Operated by: China Railway (Guangzhou–Maoming railway); Guangdong Intercity (Guangzhou–Zhaoqing intercity railway)
- Lines: Guangzhou–Maoming railway Guangzhou–Zhaoqing intercity railway
- Platforms: 7 (3 island platforms and 1 side platform)
- Tracks: 10

Construction
- Structure type: At-grade
- Accessible: Yes

Other information
- Station code: ZVQ (Pinyin: ZQI)

History
- Opened: 1987 (39 years ago); 30 March 2016 (10 years ago) (New station)

Services
Preceding station	Pearl River Delta Metropolitan Region Intercity Railway	Following station
Terminus	Guangzhou–Zhaoqing intercity railway	Duanzhou towards Panyu
Preceding station	China Railway	Following station
Gaoyao towards Guangzhou	Guangzhou–Maoming railway	Dinghu towards Maoming West
Location

Zhaoqing railway station (simplified Chinese: 肇庆站; traditional Chinese: 肇慶站) serves the city of Zhaoqing, Guangdong province, China. The station hosts train services to and from Guangzhou, Hong Kong, Kunming, Nanning, Hainan, and other parts of China.

The station is an intermediate stop on the Guangzhou–Maoming railway and the western terminus of the higher-speed Guangzhou–Zhaoqing intercity railway.

== History ==
Previously, the station had an immigration checkpoint within the station for the daily Guangdong Through Train service to and from Hung Hom station in Kowloon, Hong Kong. Due to the renovation of the checkpoint, the through train service has been suspended since 16 April 2017. The service was officially shortened to Guangzhou East railway station on 10 June 2019, leaving the border crossing facilities in the station abandoned.

On 10 April 2021, service patterns were changed and through running between Zhaoqing and Shenzhen Airport was introduced.
