= Panyu railway station =

Guangdong Intercity railway station in Guangzhou, China

Panyu 番禺
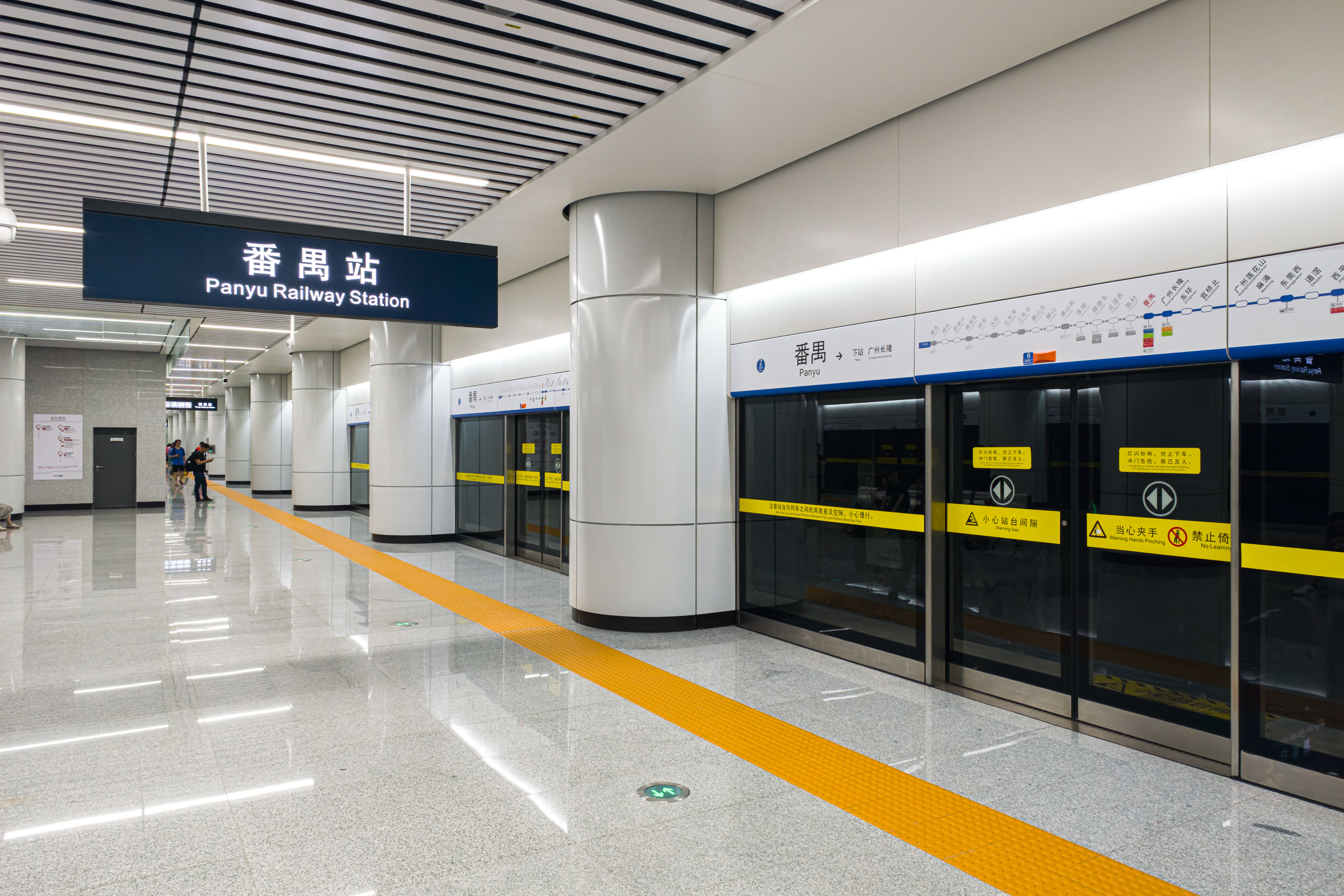
- Platform 2 (towards Huizhou North)

Chinese name
- Chinese: 番禺站
Transcriptions
Standard Mandarin
- Hanyu Pinyin: Pānyú Zhàn
Yue: Cantonese
- Yale Romanization: Pūn'yùh Jaahm
- Jyutping: Pun^{1}jyu^{4} Zaam^{6}

General information
- Location: Panyu District, Guangzhou, Guangdong; China
- Coordinates: 22°59′29.0″N 113°16′5.9″E
- Operator: Guangdong Intercity
- Lines: Guangzhou–Foshan circular intercity railway (Southern Ring section); Guangzhou–Zhaoqing intercity railway; Guangzhou–Huizhou intercity railway
- Platforms: 4 (1 island platform and 2 side platforms)
- Tracks: 4
- Connections: Guangzhou South; 2 7 22; 2

Construction
- Structure type: Underground
- Accessible: Yes

Other information
- Station code: PYA (Pinyin: PYU)

History
- Opened: 26 May 2024 (2 years ago)

Services
Preceding station	Pearl River Delta Metropolitan Region Intercity Railway	Following station
Chencun towards Zhaoqing	Guangzhou–Zhaoqing intercity railway	through to Guangzhou–Huizhou intercity railway
through to Guangzhou–Zhaoqing intercity railway	Guangzhou–Huizhou intercity railway	Guangzhou Changlong towards Huizhou North
Dashi East towards Huadu	Guangzhou East Ring intercity railway	through to Guangzhou–Zhaoqing intercity railway
Future services
Dashi East towards Huadu	Guangzhou–Foshan circular intercity railway	Chencun towards Foshan West
Location

Panyu railway station (Chinese: 番禺站; pinyin: Pānyú Zhàn; Cantonese Yale: Pūn'yùh Jaahm) is an underground railway station in Panyu District, Guangzhou, Guangdong, China. The station opened on 26 May 2024. It is operated by Guangdong Intercity Railway Operation Co., Ltd.

== Location ==
Panyu railway station is situated underneath the existing Guangzhou South railway station which is operated by China Railway Guangzhou Group.

== Features ==
With a total length of 1,194 meters and a total construction area of 116,000 square meters, which is equivalent to the area of 11 standard subway stations, Panyu Station was known as the largest underground intercity railway station in mainland China when it was built. The main body of the station uses white as the theme color, and the ceiling design adopts fusiform and sail shape, symbolizing Guangzhou's riding the wind and waves and sailing forward.

== Interchanges ==
Panyu railway station is an underground station located beneath Guangzhou South railway station, which is a stop on several high-speed railway lines and is also served by Line 2, Line 7, Line 22 of Guangzhou Metro and Foshan Metro Line 2. The station is connected to the concourse of Line 22, with a walking transfer time of about 5–10 minutes, and the passage is also equipped with a moving walkway. In addition, the station is connected to the underground commercial space of Guangzhou South Railway Station.

Although this station is connected to the subway station, there is no mutual recognition channel for security checks, and passengers need to go through security checks again when traveling between the two stations.

== Station structure and entrances/exits ==
The station has one island platform and two side platforms, which are laid along the South South Railway Station Road in an east-west direction.

=== Layout ===
G		Entrances/Exits
L1	Concourse	Ticket Office, Waiting Area; Non-paid area transfer passage toward 22 Guangzhou South Railway Station
L2; Platforms	Side platform, doors will open on the left
L2; Platforms	Platform 1	East Ring towards Huadu or Feixia (Dashi East); GH towards Huizhou North (Guangzhou Changlong)
L2; Platforms	Platform 2	GH towards Huizhou North (Guangzhou Changlong)
L2; Platforms	Island platform, doors will open on the right
L2; Platforms	Platform 3	Guangzhao towards Foshan West or Zhaoqing (Chencun)
L2; Platforms	Platform 4	Guangzhao towards Foshan West or Zhaoqing (Chencun)
L2; Platforms	Side platform, doors will open on the left

=== Entrances/exits ===
There are currently 4 points of entry/exit that are open. Exit G is accessible via elevator.

- C: Shixing Avenue South
- F: South Railway Station South Road, Guangzhou South Railway Station East Square
- G: South Railway Station South Road, Guangzhou South Railway Station East Square, Guangzhou South Railway Station Coach Terminal, Guangzhou South railway station
  2 7 22 2 (Guangzhou South Railway Station)
- H2: Shipu Avenue South
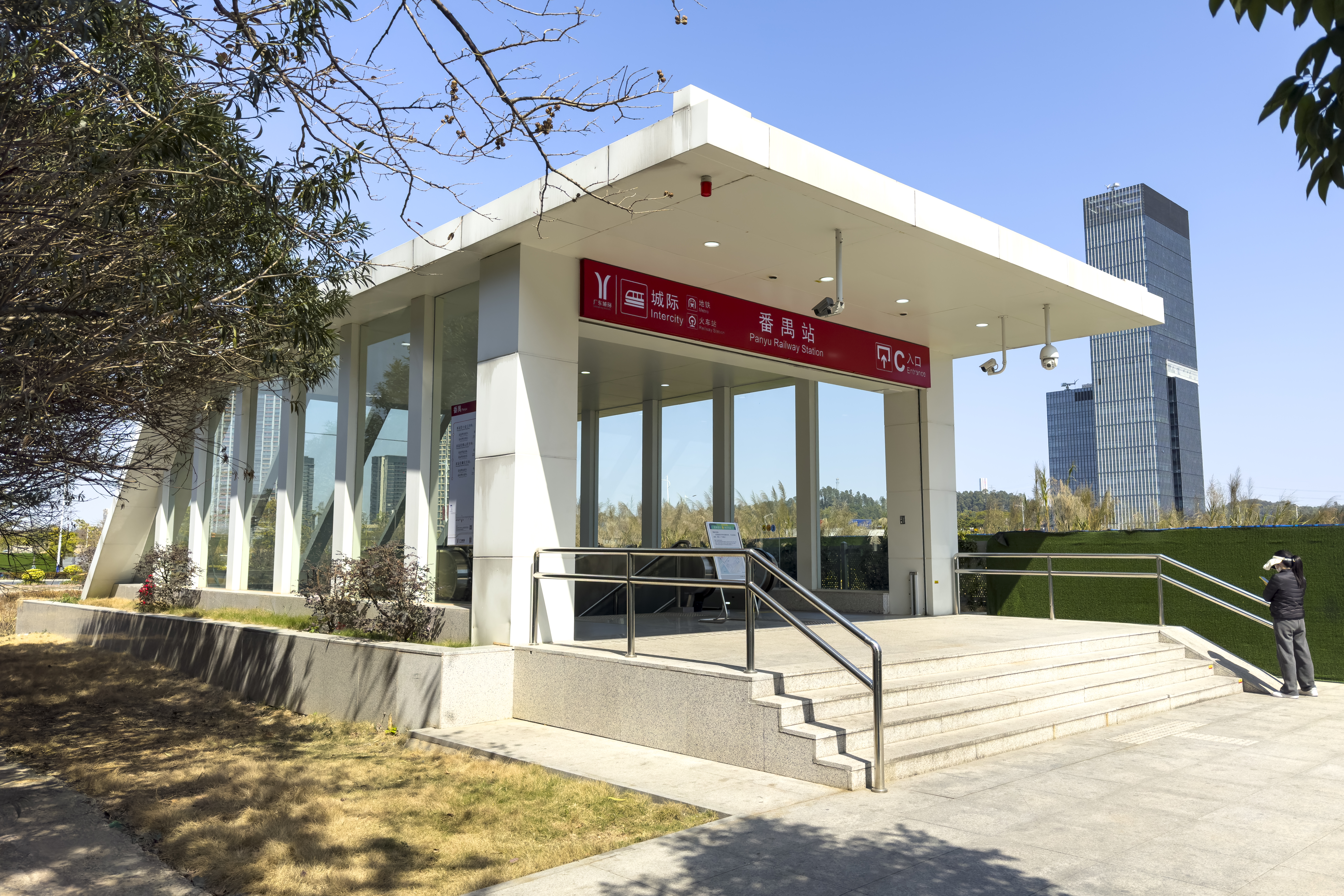
Entrance C

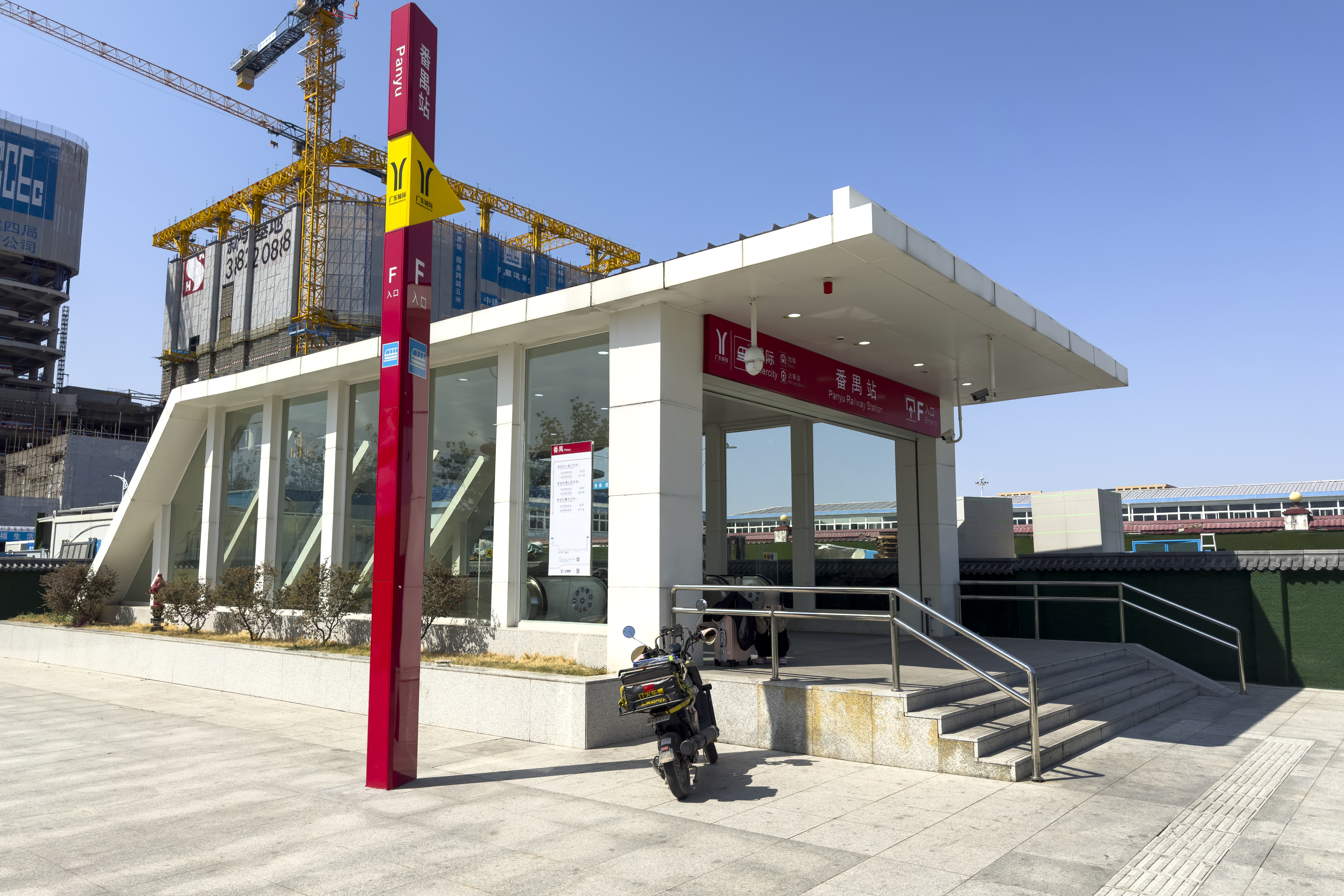
Entrance F

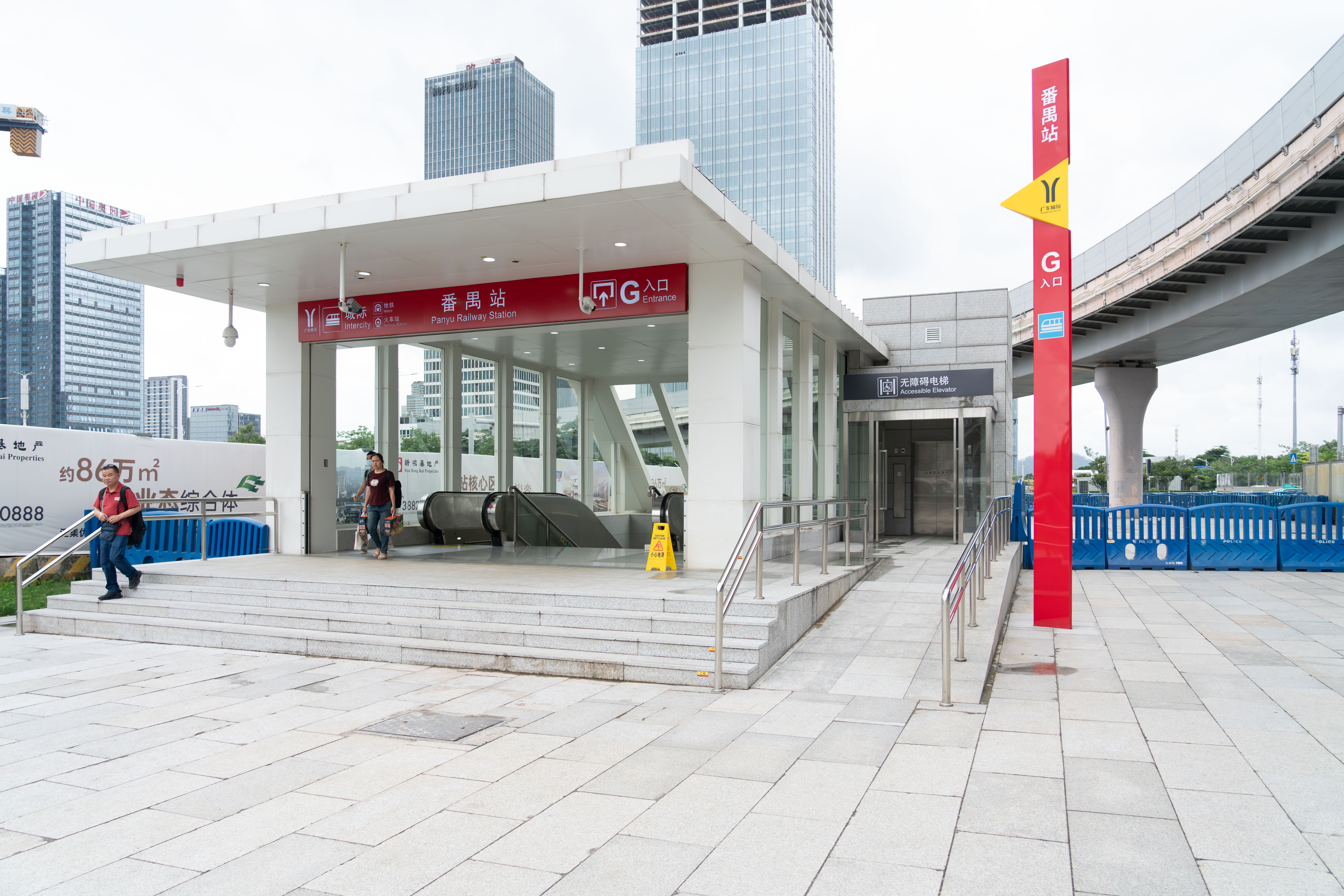
Entrance G

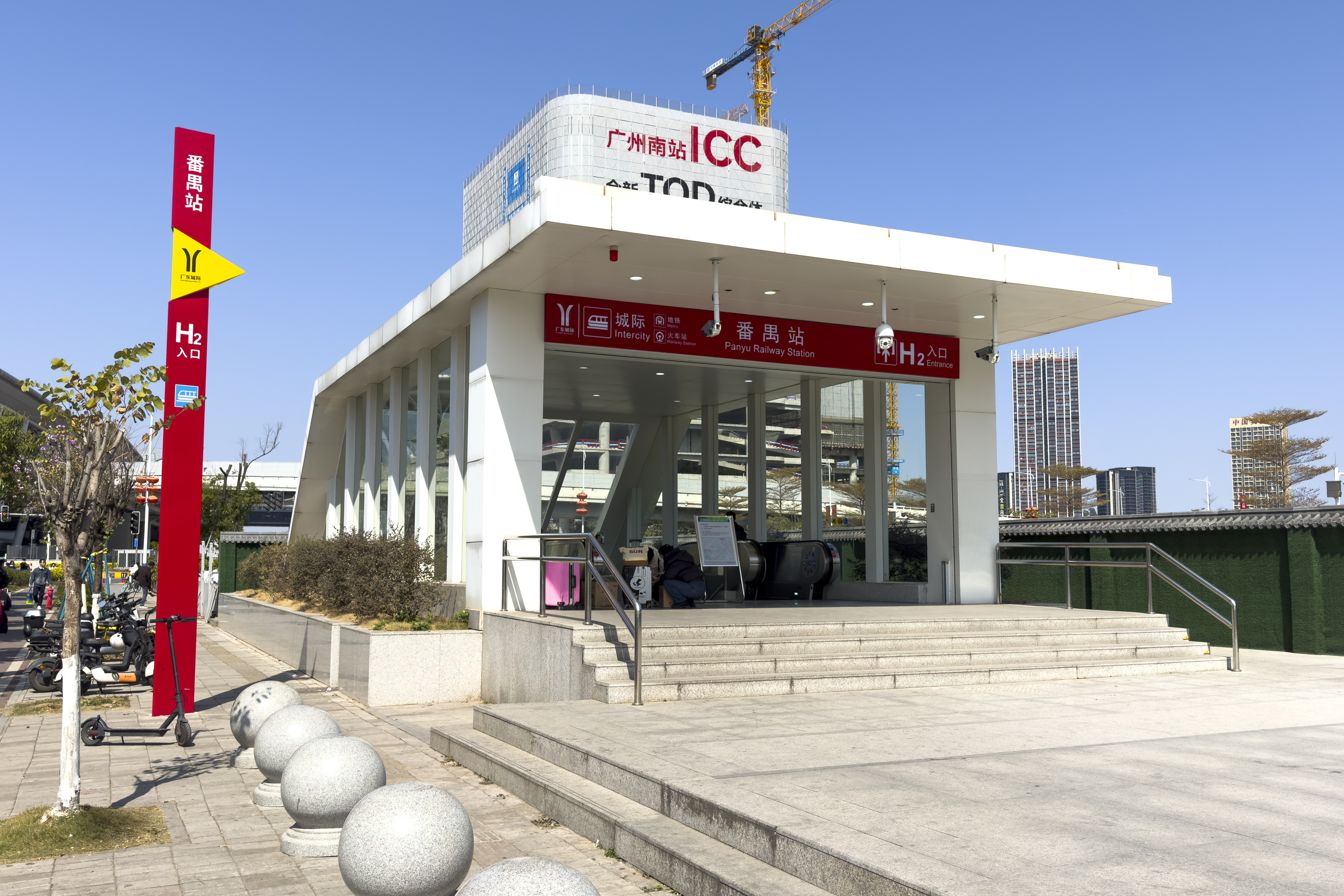
Entrance H2

== History ==
This station was originally planned to share the name "Guangzhou South" with the existing Guangzhou South railway station operated by China Railway Guangzhou Group. However, in August 2020, the station was renamed Panyu railway station, as according to the naming rules of railway stations, intercity railways and national railway stations cannot have the same name. This meant that in order to facilitate the scheduling and operation organization of the platforms, the station did not use the station name of "Guangzhou South Railway Station", which meant the station had to be later named Panyu Station.

== Usage ==
After the opening of this station, the passenger flow has been very good, and many passengers will use this station to transfer to high-speed rail or metro. Since the opening of Guangzhou-Huizhou and Guangzhou-Zhaoqing intercity lines, the station is the second largest station in terms of passenger flow among the five cities on the line, and it is also the station with the largest passenger flow in Guangzhou. However, due to the large passenger flow and the lack of security equipment and ticket gates at the station, a large number of passengers queuing up to enter the concourse in the early stage of opening often caused inconvenience.

== Gallery ==
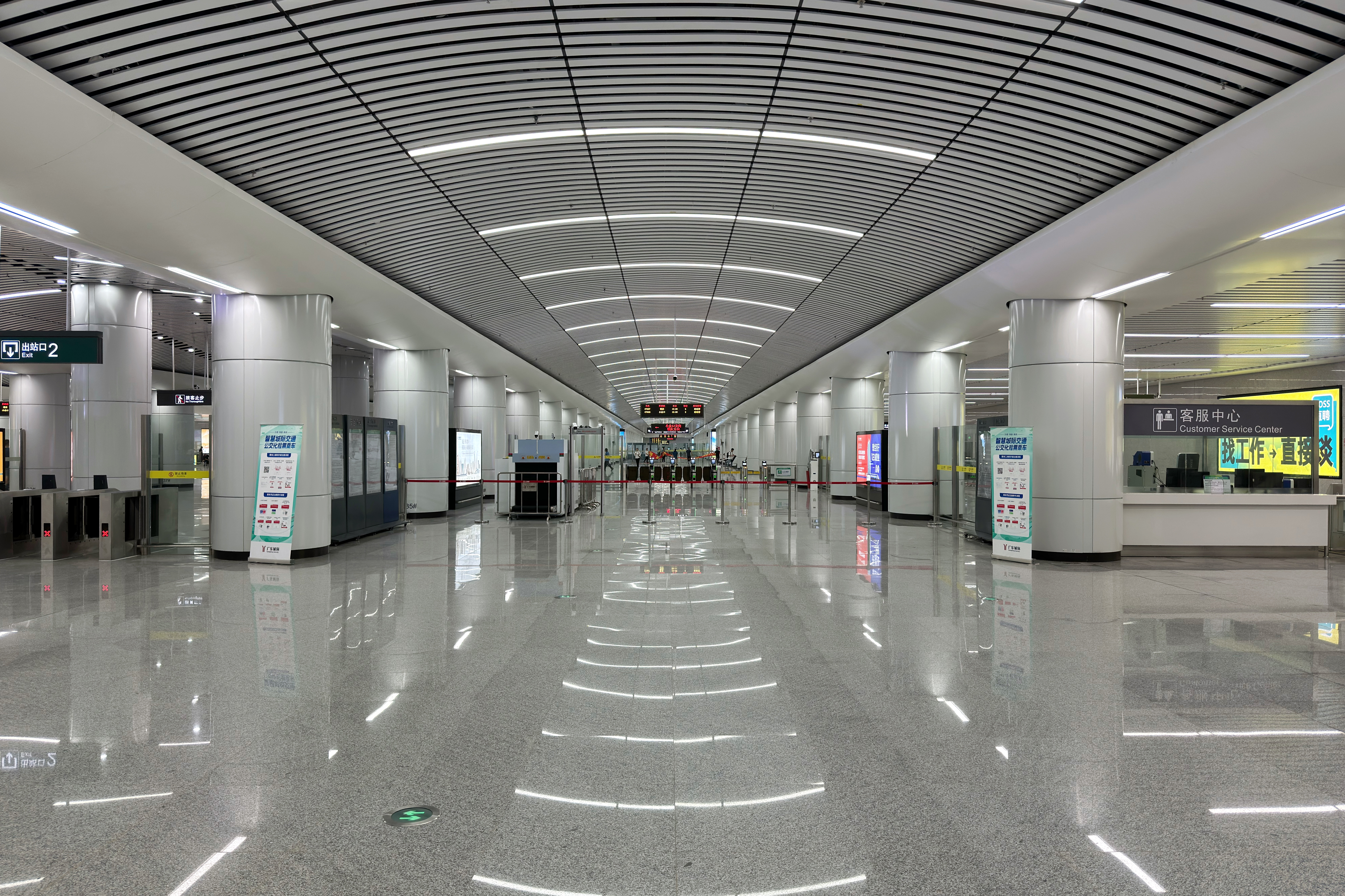
Concourse

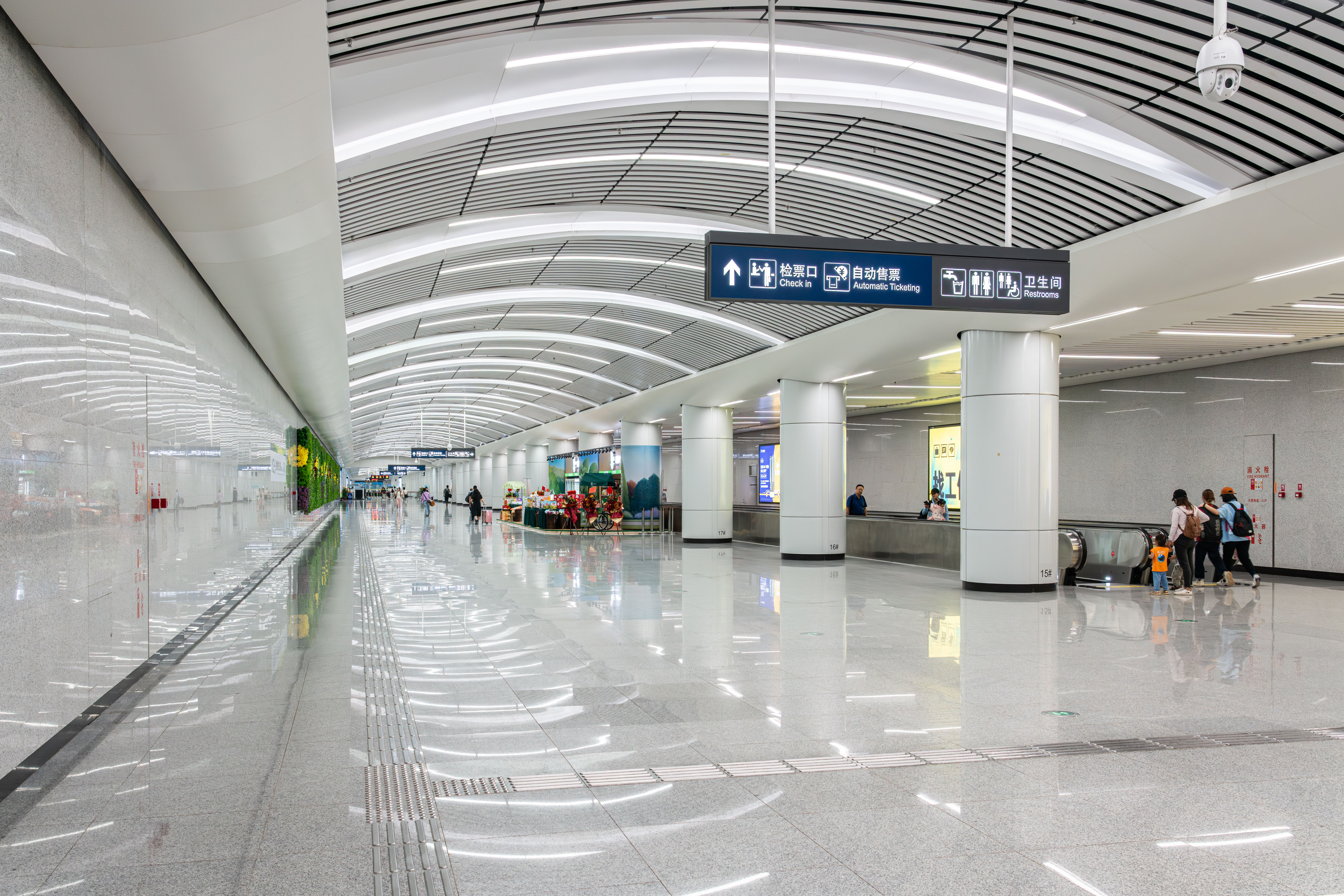
Transfer passageway

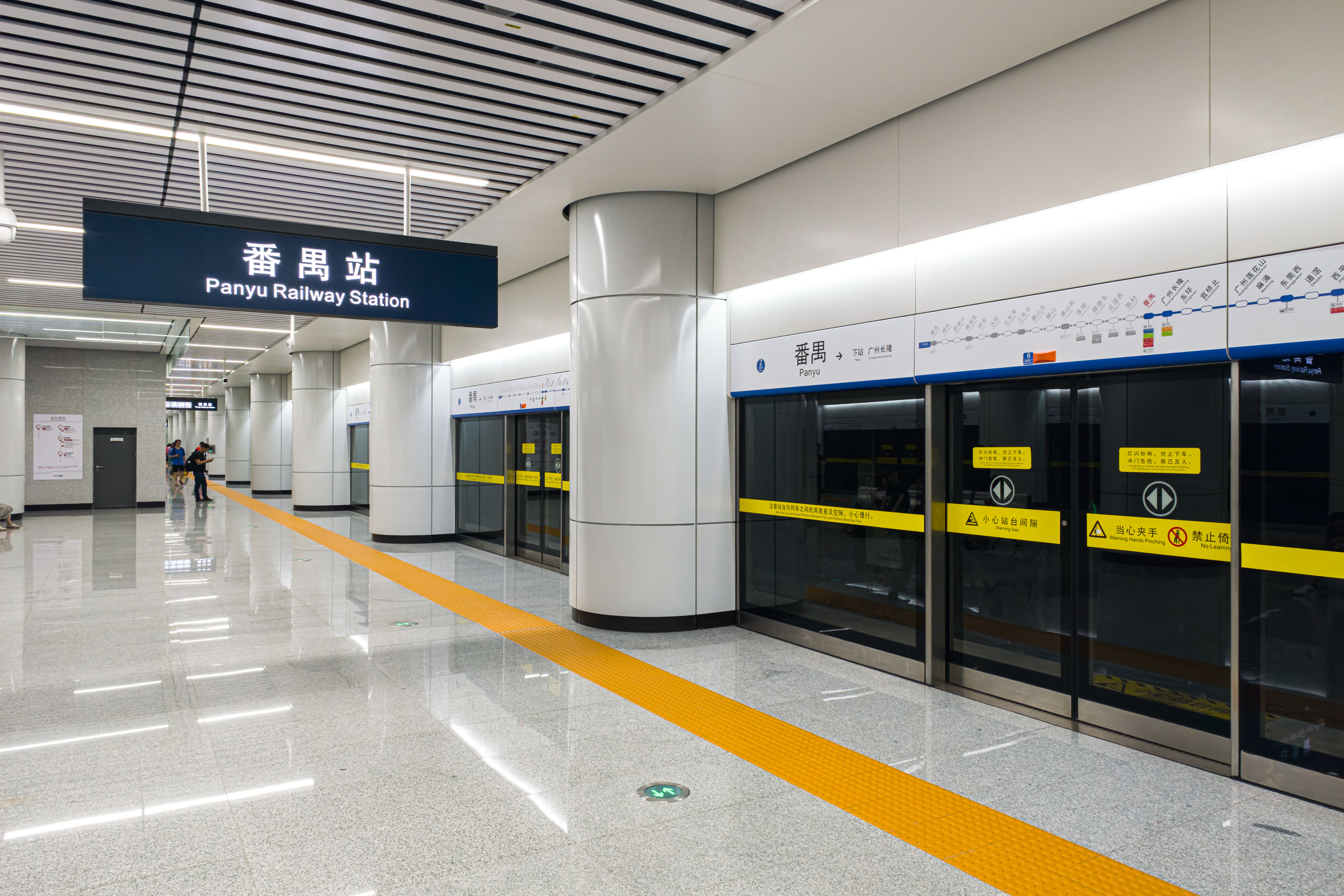
Platform 2 (towards Dongguan and Huizhou)

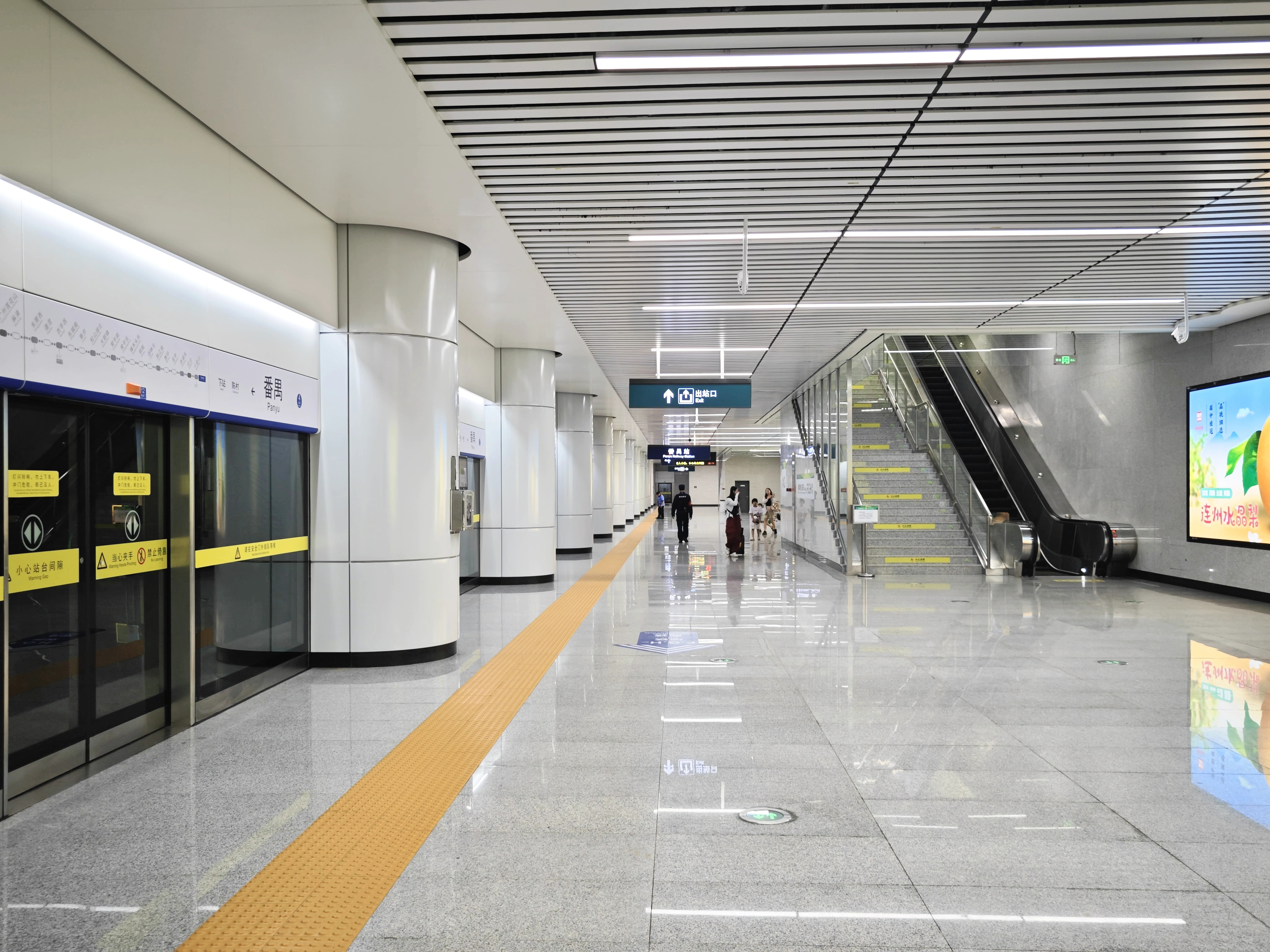
Platform 4 (towards Zhaoqing)

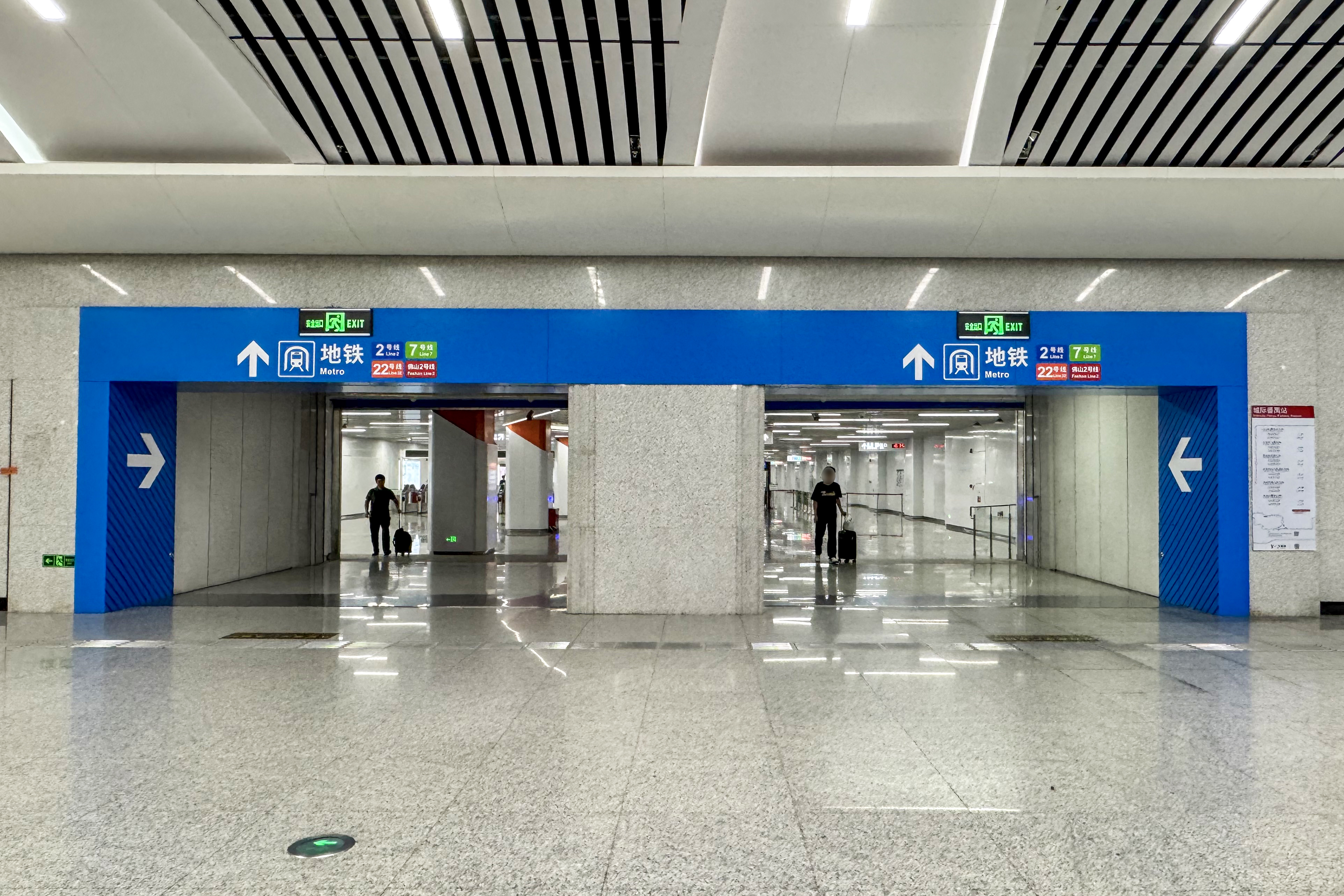
Entrance/exit G is equipped with an interface to the Line 22 part of Guangzhou South metro station
