= Pearl River Delta Metropolitan Region intercity railway =

Regional rail network in South China

Overview
- Locale: Pearl River Delta
- Transit type: Higher-speed rail, Regional rail
- Number of lines: 7
- Number of stations: 116

Operation
- Began operation: 2011
- Operators: China Railway Guangzhou Group; Guangdong Intercity Railway Operation Co., Ltd.

Technical
- System length: 763.8 km (474.6 mi)
- Track gauge: 1,435 mm (4 ft 8 1/2 in) standard gauge
- Electrification: AC 25 kV overhead lines
System map
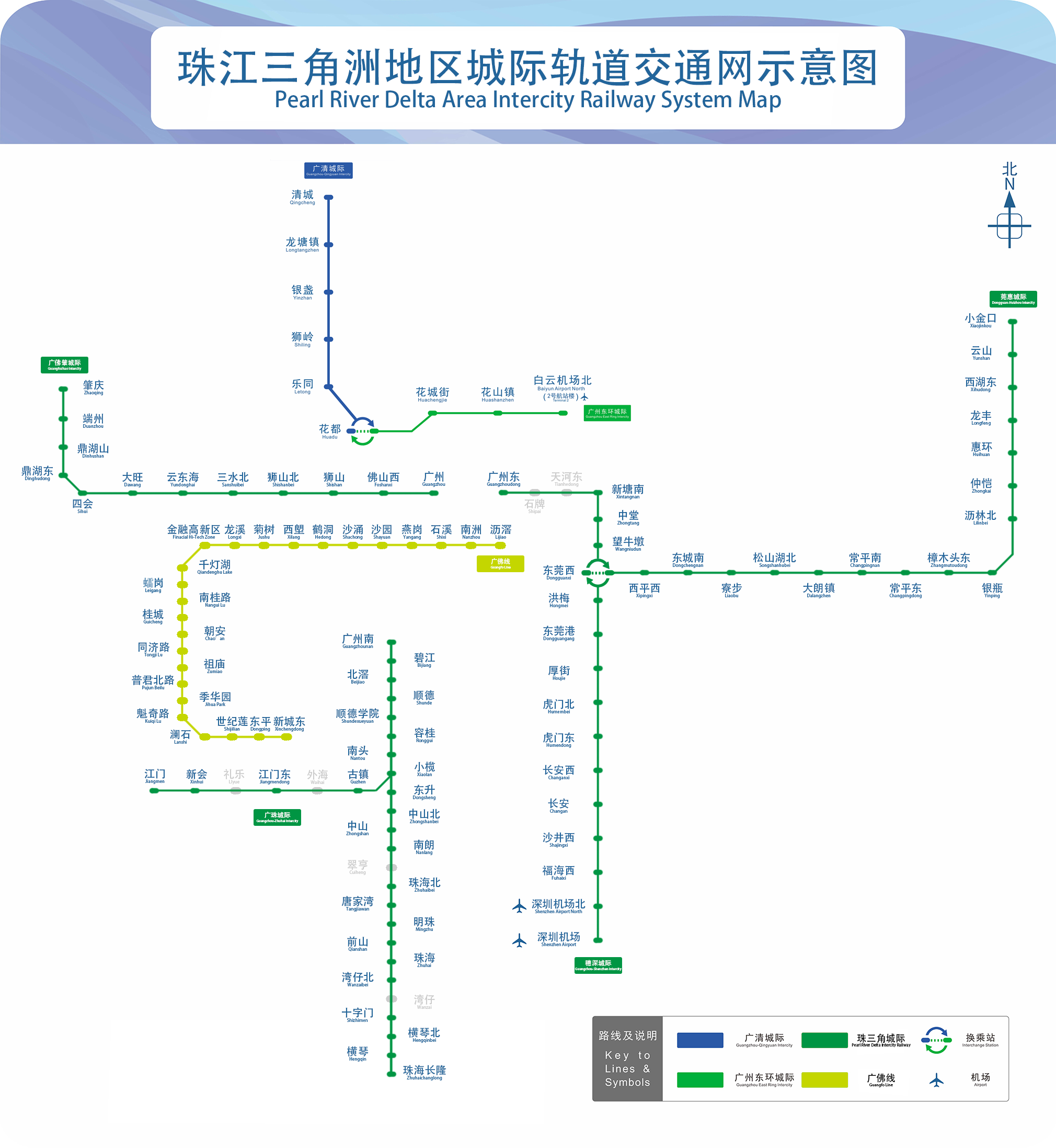

Pearl River Delta Metropolitan Area Intercity Railway
- Traditional Chinese: 珠江三角洲地區城際軌道交通
- Simplified Chinese: 珠江三角洲地区城际轨道交通
Transcriptions
Standard Mandarin
- Hanyu Pinyin: Zhūjiāng Sānjiǎozhōu Dìqū Chéngjì Guǐdào Jiāotōng
Yue: Cantonese
- Jyutping: zyu^{1}gong^{1}saam^{1}gok^{3}zau^{1}dei^{6}keoi^{1}sing^{4}zai^{3}gwai^{2}dou^{6}gaau^{1}tung^{1}

The Pearl River Delta Metropolitan Region Intercity Railway System (Chinese: 珠江三角洲地区城际轨道交通; Jyutping: zyu^{1} gong^{1} saam^{1} gok^{3} zau^{1} dei^{6} keoi^{1} sing^{4} zai^{3} gwai^{2} dou^{6} gaau^{1} tung^{1}; pinyin: Zhūjiāng sānjiǎozhōu dìqū chéng jì guǐdào jiāotōng, abbreviated as PRDIR) is a regional higher-speed rail and suburban rail network in the Pearl River Delta (Guangdong–Hong Kong–Macao Greater Bay Area) in South China. The project's goal is to have every major urban center in the Greater Bay Area to be within one-hour travel by rail to Guangzhou. On March 16, 2005, the State Council approved plans for a regional high-speed commuter rail network for the Jingjinji, the Yangtze River Delta and the Pearl River Delta. According to the plan, by 2020, the network will have a total route mileage of about 600 kilometres (370 mi). In September 2009, the plan was expanded to 1,478 km (918 mi) of routes split up into 23 lines. In the long-term vision network length will reach 1,890 km (1,170 mi) by 2030. By then the network will provide basic coverage to the Pearl River Delta region. The Suishen ICR, Guanghui ICR and Guangfozhao ICR accept Alipay, avoiding the need to purchase tickets in advance.

== Operational lines ==

The system currently has seven lines, as of July 2026. Note that Guangfo line is not included in the list.

Line	Terminals		Opened	Length km	Active Stations	Operator	Owner
Guangzhu	Guangzhou South	Zhuhai	2011	177.534	23	CR Guangzhou Group	Guangdong Guangzhu Intercity Rail Transit
Guangzhu	Guangzhou South	Jiangmen	2011	177.534	23	CR Guangzhou Group	Guangdong Guangzhu Intercity Rail Transit
Zhuji	Zhuhai	Zhuhai Airport	2020	39.24	6	CR Guangzhou Group	Guangdong Guangzhu Intercity Rail Transit
Guanghui	Panyu	Huizhou North	2016	146.64	25	Guangdong Intercity	PRDIR
Guangzhao	Panyu	Zhaoqing	2016	121.7	16	Guangdong Intercity	PRDIR
Suishen	Zhuliao	Shenzhen Airport	2019	121.2	23	Guangdong Intercity	PRDIR
Guangqing	Guangzhou Baiyun	Feixia	2020	79.9	13	Guangdong Intercity	PRDIR
East Ring	Huadu	Panyu	2020	77.953	15	Guangdong Intercity	PRDIR
Palian	Pazhou	Guangzhou Lianhuashan	2025	18.2	4	Guangdong Intercity	PRDIR

=== Guangzhu ICR ===
The Guangzhou–Zhuhai Intercity Railway or Guangzhu Intercity Railway is a 116 km dedicated, grade-separated passenger railway linking New Guangzhou Station in Panyu, Guangzhou, and Zhuhai Airport in Zhuhai, via Shunde, Zhongshan and Jiangmen. Operation began in 2011.

=== Suishen ICR ===
The Guangzhou–Shenzhen Intercity Railway, also known as the Suishen Intercity Railway (Chinese: 穗深城际铁路; pinyin: Suì-Shēn Chéngjì Tiělù) is a 97-kilometre (60 mi) regional rapid railway line that runs roughly along the east bank of the Pearl River connecting the major cities of Guangzhou, Dongguan, and Shenzhen. It will use CRH6 EMUs with a top speed of 140 km/h (87 mph). Operation began on 15 December 2019. In January 2026, Guangdong Intercity obtained operating rights and was incorporated into the network of PRDIR.

=== Zhuji ICR ===
The Zhuji Intercity Railway is a high-speed railway connecting Gongbei Subdistrict in Zhuhai with Zhuhai Jinwan Airport via Hengqin. Phase 1 started operation on 18 August 2020. Phase 2 from Zhuhai Changlong to Zhuhai Airport opened on 3 March 2024.

=== Guanghui ICR ===
The Guanghui Intercity Railway or Guanghui Urban Railway is a 25 station, 146.6 km long, regional rapid railway line that connects Guangzhou to Huizhou. The line was originally planned to use subway type cars with Siemens technology. However it was plans changed partway through construction to use 8 car CRH6 EMUs capable of running up to 200 km/h (120 mph). The line started construction in 2009 and was expected to open in late 2013. Construction was completed in June 2013 and test runs began in 2014, but the first segment of the line, from Xiaojinkou-Changping East did not open until 30 March 2016. On 23 January 2024, operation of Guanghui ICR has transferred from CR Guangzhou to Guangdong Intercity company.

=== Guangzhao ICR ===
The Guangzhao Intercity Railway or Fozhao Urban Railway is a 16 station long regional rapid railway line. It connects Guangzhou to Zhaoqing, via Foshan. Operation began on 30 March 2016. On 23 January 2024, operation of Guangzhao ICR has transferred from CR Guangzhou to Guangdong Intercity company.

=== Palian ICR ===
The Pazhou-Lianhuashan Intercity Railway, as the project name is the "Pazhou Branch Line of the Guangzhou-Shenzhen Intercity Railway," branches off from Pazhou Station on the Guangzhou East Ring intercity railway and connects to Lianhuashan Station on the Guangzhou-Huizhou Intercity Railway. It opened on 29 September 2025.

== Lines under construction ==
Under construction
Project	Terminals/Stations	Length km (mi)	Stations	Construction progress (Note: As of September 2025.)	Expected opening time	Owner	Operator
SS Southern extension	Shenzhen Airport – Qianhai	15.15 km (9.41 mi)	3	Under construction	Late-2026	Suishen intercity railway	Shenguanhui Intercity (subsidiary of Shenzhen Metro)
SS Southern extension	Qianhai – Huanggang Checkpoint	20.547 km (12.767 mi)	2	Under construction	TBD	Suishen intercity railway	Shenguanhui Intercity (subsidiary of Shenzhen Metro)
GFC West Ring	Foshan West – Huadu	47.01 km (29.21 mi)	9	Under construction	2027	Guangfo West Ring Intercity	Guangdong Intercity

=== Guangfo Circular ICR ===
Ring service around Guangzhou and Foshan, mostly making use of trackage from other Metropolitan Region Intercity Railway Lines and existing freight railways. A new section under construction, known as the Guangfo Link, is a 35 km long railway line that connects Guangzhou South Railway Station to Foshan West Railway Station. It has a top speed of 200 kilometres per hour (120 mph) and will use 6 car CRH6 EMUs capable of running up to 2.5-minute frequencies. It is expected to start construction in late 2012 and completed in 2016 or 2017. This has now since been delayed to 2027.

=== Shenzhen–Dayawan ICR ===
An underground regional railway connecting Shenzhen and Huiyang District in southern Huizhou from Shenzhen Bao'an International Airport to Shenzhen Pingshan railway station. It started construction in 2022 and is expected to complete in late 2026.

=== Shenhui ICR ===
An underground regional railway connecting Shenzhen and Huicheng District in northern Huizhou. It started construction in 2022 and is expected to complete in late 2026.

== See also ==
- Shenzhen Metro
- Dongguan Rail Transit
- Foshan Metro (FMetro)
- Guangzhou Metro
- Hong Kong MTR
- Macau Light Rail Transit
- List of suburban and commuter rail systems
