= Guangdong Intercity =

Chinese railway company

Guangdong Intercity Railway Operation Co., Ltd. (Chinese: 广东城际铁路运营有限公司), also known as Guangdong Intercity (Chinese: 广东城际), is a wholly owned subsidiary of Guangzhou Metro Group and is mainly engaged in the operation of Pearl River Delta Metropolitan Region intercity railway. The company was registered in Guangzhou on June 11, 2019, at Nansha District, Guangzhou.

Guangdong Intercity is operating Guangqing, Guangzhou East Ring, Guanghui and Guangzhao intercity railways, as well as Guangzhou Metro Line 18 and Line 22. It will operate Xinbaiguang intercity railway and Guangzhou–Foshan circular intercity railway in the future.
