= Jiangmen Radio and Television Station =

Media company in Guangdong, China

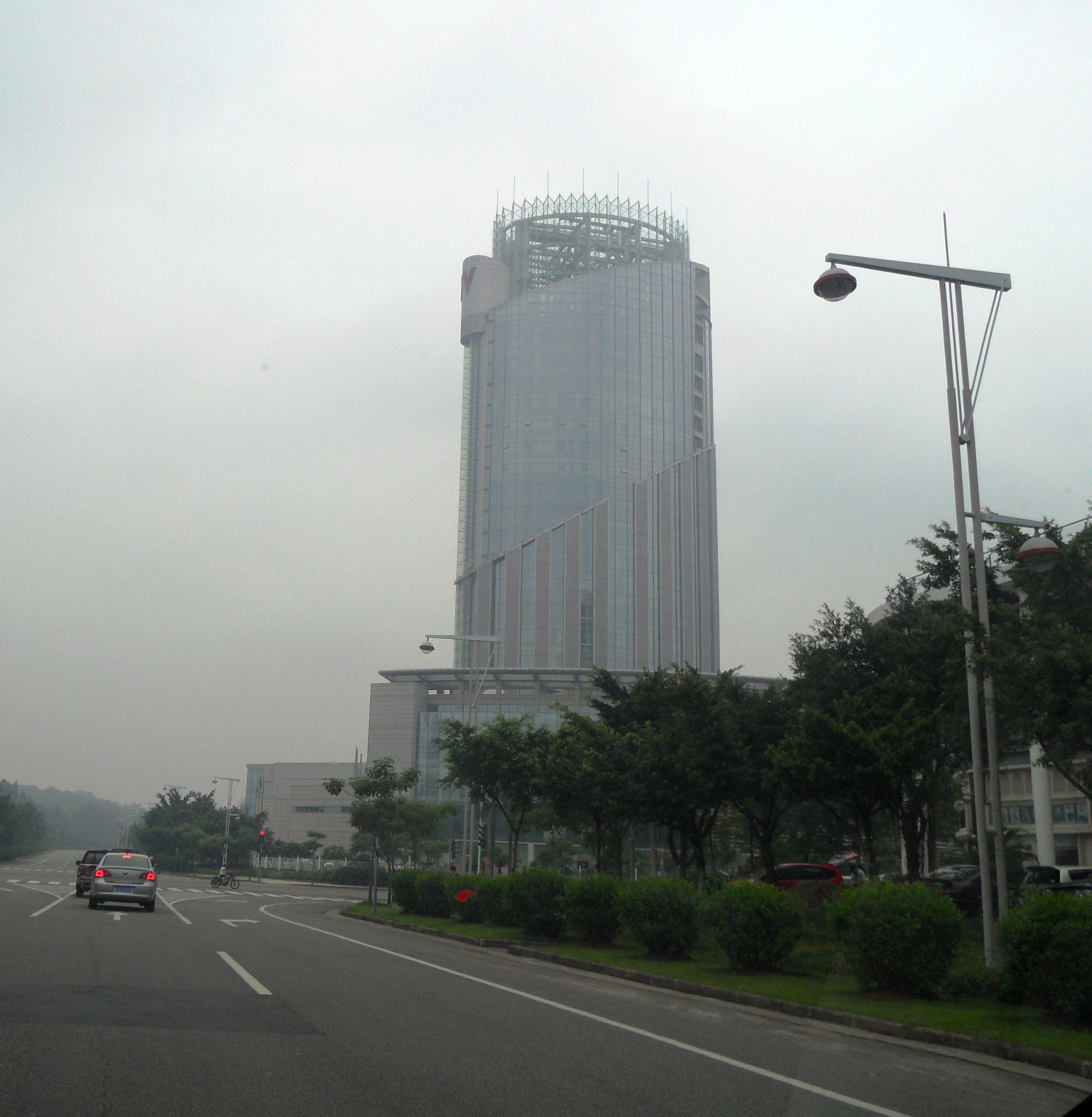
- Jiangmen Radio and Television Center
- Type: Public
- Country: China
- First air date: 8 July 1990 (radio); 28 January 1987 (television)
- Headquarters: Jiangmen
- Owner: Propaganda Committee of the Jiangmen Municipal Committee of the CCP
- Parent: Southern Media Corporation
- Established: 23 March 2004 (current corporation)
- Official website: www.jmtv.cn

The Jiangmen Radio and Television Station (江门广播电视台) is a municipal-level radio and television station based in Jiangmen, Guangdong Province. The radio station started on 8 July 1990 and the television station on 28 January 1987. These were merged into one larger radio and television company on 23 March 2004.

== History ==
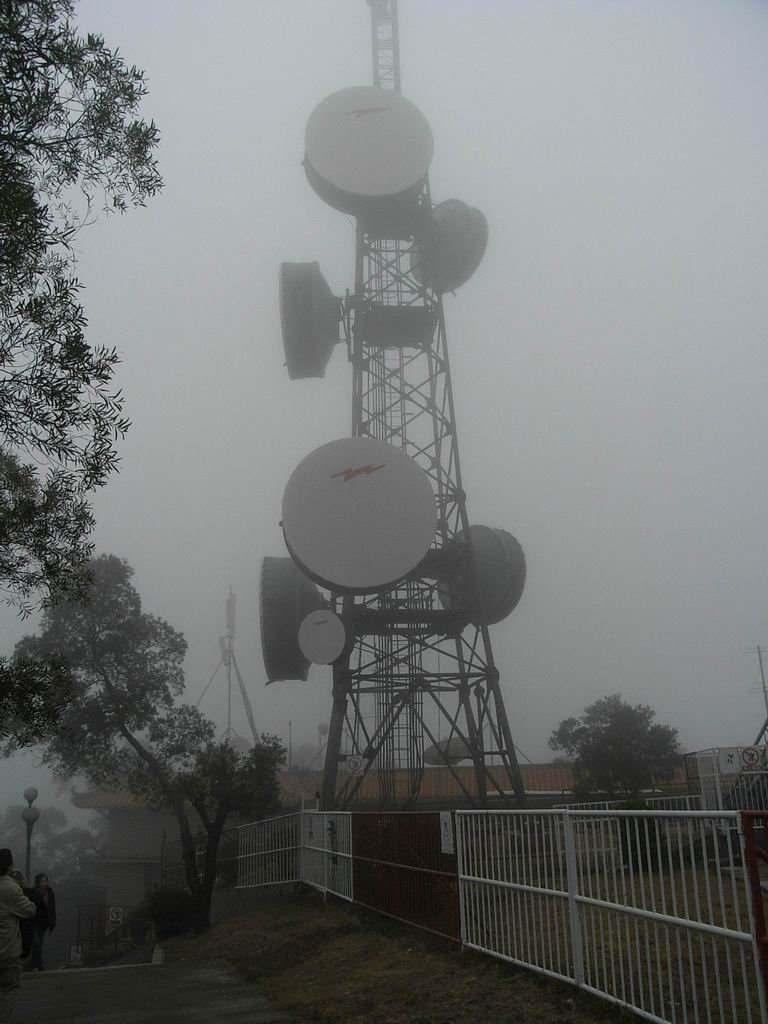
Radio and television transmitter at Guifeng Mountain

In 1974, the Jiangmen Broadcasting Station installed a television transmitting station at Goushan and started relaying television signals on 1 May 1975. In 1983, the governments of the city of Jiangmen, of the Foshan area and other nearby locations jointly invested the installation of an FM transmitter at Guifeng Mountain in Xinhui County. In 1984, Jiangmen Television Stations was officially established. On 28 January 1987, JTS started broadcating on VHF channel 4 from the Goushan transmitter. The TV transmitter moved to Guifeng in 1992, in order to cover a 70-kilometer radius, in order to reach all counties and cities of Jiangmen.

On 23 March 2004, Jiangmen Television Stations and the Jiangmen People's Broadcasting Station merged to form the current corporation, which is subordinate to the Southern Media Corporation. In 2006, the Jiangmen Radio and Television Station moved from its original premises at Goushan Mountain to the Radio and Television Center at Development Avenue, Jiangmen City. On 28 May 2014, the Jiangmen TV News and General Channel began receiving coverage on the cable companies of Foshan, Zhaoqing, Huizhou, Qingyuan, Zhuhai, Dongguan and Zhongshan.

On 18 June 2022, the Jiangmen Radio and Television Station announced changes to its television offer, including the shutdown of the Education Channel and the reconversion of the Public Channel into the Overseas Chinese Life Channel. The Overseas Chinese Life Channel was slated for closure in July 2025 and shut down definitely on 8 September.

== Services ==
The Jiangmen Radio and Television Station is a public institution, directly subordinate to the Jiangmen Municipal Committee of the Chinese Communist Party and is directly managed by its Propaganda Department. It owns one television channel and two radio stations. It also has its official website, WeChat and Sina Weibo accounts and other digital media platforms.

=== Television ===
Name	Launch date
News and General Channel	27 June 1984

==== Former channels ====
- Education Channel: Formerly known as Jiangmen Educational Television Station, it started broadcasting in 1993 and was discontinued on 18 June 2022.
- Overseas Chinese Life Channel: Formerly Jiangmen Cable TV Channel 1, it was originally a channel aimed at public policies, being subsequently renamed Jiangmen Public Channel, keeping its profile. In 2022, it became the Overseas Chinese Life Channel. Before closure, it specialized in lifestyle and leisure programming mainly regarding the Chinese diaspora. It shut down on 8 September 2025.

=== Radio stations ===
Name	Frequency	Launch date	Former name	Notes
General Station	FM100.2	1990		News, public interest, service and supervision
Voice of Tourism	FM93.3	2004	Travel and Music	Mainly serves tourists, with lifestyle and service information as well as music.

== Programming ==
As part of the local CCP Municipal Committee and the municipal government, Jiangmen Radio and Television Station is qualified to produce, organize and distribute radio and television programs, being responsible for the distribution of central and provincial programs to serve CCP propaganda at all government levels. The radio station airs China National Radio's National News Broadcast and China Central Television's News Network. In addition to its own news service and the Midday Live Studio, the radio station produces arts and music programming such as Jianzai Music Magazine, Eighteen and Twenty-Two Colorful Pastries and Accidentally on Camera, programs with high listening figures; Jianzai Music Festival mainly airs classic Chinese pop music, starting in the early days of the radio station in the early 90s and is one of its most popular programs.

Jiangmen Radio and Televisio nStation broadcasts mainly in Mandarin and Cantonese. The main news program is Jiangmen News Time with an emphasis on local news. News Together, in Cantonese, is also one of its most important television programs. Most dramas and operas produced and/or aired by the station are shown in Cantonese.

== Controversies ==
In 2011, the People's High Court of Guangdong Province handed down a final ruling that found that the pirated broadcast of the Hong Kong movie Mr. 3 Minutes by Jiangmen Cable TV and Jiangmen TV on cable television and websites constituted copyright infringement and required them to pay compensation to the copyright holder.
