= Jiangmen No. 1 Middle School =

Guangdong Jiangmen No. 1 High School (JMYZ)
- 广东江门市第一中学

Location
- No.138 Jinou Road, Jianghai District; Jiangmen; China; 22°56′N 113°11′E

Information
- Type: Public
- Motto: 明志崇德，砺教笃学
- Established: 1930
- Principal: Xia Zhiqing (2022-2025)
- Faculty: 251
- Enrollment: 3600
- Campus size: 57.66 acres
- Campus type: Urban
- Nickname: Jiangmen Yizhong
- Anthem: Light of Penglai (蓬莱之光)
- Website: http://www.jmyz.com/

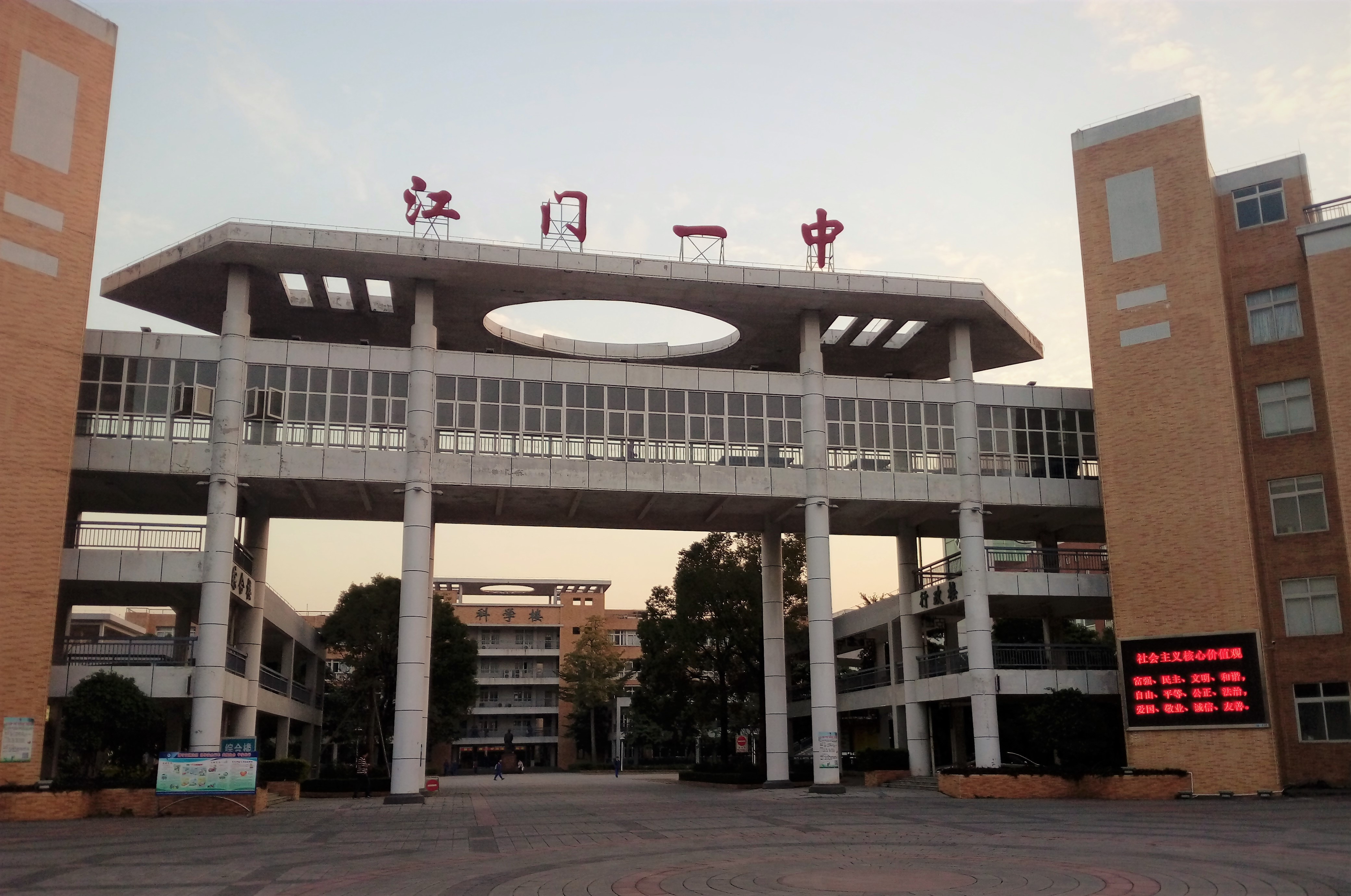
Main Entrance

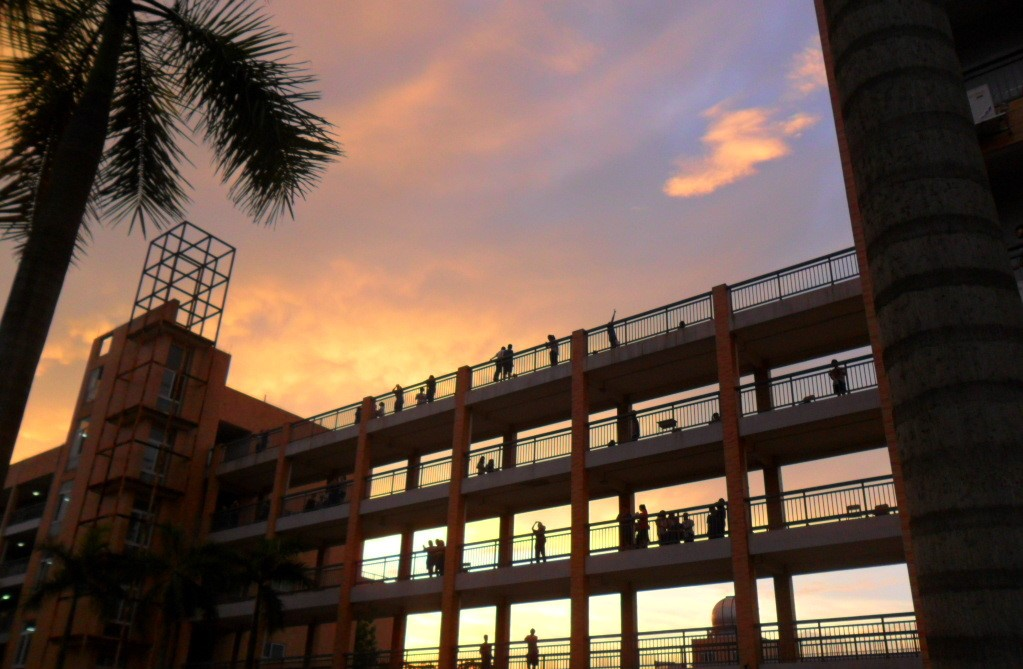
Teaching Building

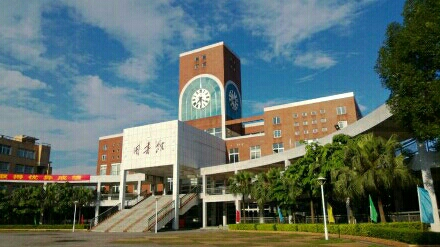
Library

Guangdong Jiangmen No.1 High School (Simplified Chinese: 广东江门市第一中学; Traditional Chinese: 廣東江門市第一中學, commonly abbreviated as Jiangmen Yizhong or JMYZ) is a full-time and all boarding senior high school in Jianghai District, Jiangmen, Guangdong, China. Its earliest predecessor Jingxian Academy of Classical Learning was established during the Qing dynasty (1760) and expanded to a municipal high school in 1928. It is one of the most prestigious high schools in Five Counties in Guangdong (五邑地区) now.

== History ==
- In 1760 (Qing dynasty), JMYZ's predecessor Jingxian Academy of Classical Learning (景賢書院/景贤书院) was established by the local governor Zhou Zhirang.
- After the Xinhai Revolution (1911), Jingxian Academy was renamed as Jingxian Higher Primary School.
- In 1930, Jingxian Higher primary School was expanded to a municipal high school in Jiangmen.
- In 1931, it was renamed as Xinhui County No.2 Middle School, because Jiangmen City was changed into Jiangmen Town, governed by Xinhui County.
- After 1949, Xinhui County No.2 Middle School merged with Pengjiang Middle School (蓬江中学) and Mianxiang Middle School (缅香中学).
- In 1952, Xinhui County No.2 Middle School was renamed as Guangdong Jiangmen No.1 Middle School (JMYZ).
- In 1960, JMYZ was considered as one of the first batch of 16 key middle schools in Guangdong Province.
- In the 1990s, JMYZ was rated as one of the first batch of provincial first-class schools.
- In 2005, JMYZ was relocated to the present address (Jianghai District) by the Jiangmen Municipal Government.
- In 2006, JMYZ was awarded as one of the first batch of national model high schools.
- In 2007, JMYZ was honored with the title of Senior High School with Excellent Teaching Quality in Guangdong.

== Curriculum ==
In Guangdong Jiangmen No.1 Middle School, there are mainly 3 types of curriculum for different senior high school students:

1. General senior high school curriculum
  - Generally speaking, it is set up for students who choose to take the National Higher Education Entrance Examination (NHEEE) when they are in senior year. In the first semester of the first year, these students should not only study 3 major subjects: Chinese, Math and English, but also social-science-oriented subjects (History, Geography, Politics) and natural-science-oriented subjects (Physics, Chemistry, Biology). In the second semester of the first year, they should make a choice to study social science or natural science in the last two year and a half, so they need to study 6 subjects for the NHEEE.
2. Art Courses
  - Set up for students who choose to take the Art College Entrance Examination, both major courses (Sketch) and academic courses are arranged for them.
3. International Education (ISS)
  - Guangdong Jiangmen No.1 Middle School set up International curriculum experimental classes (国际课程实验班) in 2012, for high school students who nurse aspirations to study aboard. Instead of taking the National Higher Education Entrance Examination, they spend 3 years to prepare for High school level test, A-levels / SAT, and IELTS test, and then apply for overseas universities.

== Facilities ==
The new campus of JMYZ has been basically completed and fully operational on September 1, 2005. With an area of near 58 acres, there are both learning equipment and living facilities providing for students, including a library, an art building, a science building, an administrative building, 6 teaching buildings, 9 dormitory buildings for both students and staffs, a three-storeyed canteen, a new gymnasium established in September 2012, 15 basketball courts, 14 badminton courts, 9 volleyball courts, 2 football pitches, a standard swimming pool, etc. To improve educational capacity and conditions, the school launched the Expansion and Efficiency Improvement Project in 2019, adding a new Innovation Center (with a 500-seat lecture hall), a science teaching building, a staff dormitory with an underground parking lot. In 2022, two new teaching buildings—Keheng Building and Jianming Building—were put into use, featuring subject-specific labs, maker spaces, AI laboratories, smart blackboards, electronic class boards, and 200-seat lecture halls, upgrading intelligent teaching infrastructure.

A campus renovation and upgrading project with a total investment of 130 million yuan began in 2025, including construction of a new dormitory building and comprehensive refurbishment of teaching buildings, dormitories, canteens, art buildings and campus roads, further optimizing the learning and living environment.

== Faculty and staff ==
Jiangmen No.1 Middle School currently has 285 full-time teachers, including 1 recipient of the State Council Special Government Allowance, 1 Distinguished Teacher under the Guangdong Special Support Program, and 2 Special-class Teachers. There are 4 Full Senior Teachers and 107 Associate Senior Teachers. A total of 137 teachers hold master's degrees.

Since 2020, the school has established 1 provincial-level studio for distinguished teachers or head teachers, 5 municipal-level studios, and 18 school-level studios. In the Guangdong Primary and Secondary School Young Teachers' Teaching Ability Competition, the school received 1 first prize (first place in the Chinese subject category) and 6 second and third prizes in 2021, and 5 second prizes in 2023. In head teacher competence competitions, members of the school's moral education team received 1 provincial-level award and 5 municipal-level awards.

In the past two years, 7 teachers were selected as Jiangmen "Top 100 Teachers". Jiang Jiajun and Wu Yuhua were named "Top 10 Teachers of Jiangmen"; Jin Keming, Li Shaoying and Wang Chao were named "Top 10 Young Teachers of Jiangmen"; and Song Bingyu and Cao Xia were named "Annual Outstanding Teachers of Jiangmen".

The school has implemented several professional development initiatives, including the Quality Improvement Project, the Blue-Green Mentorship Project for young teachers, and the Strong Teachers Optimization Project. It also participates in provincial-level platforms such as the Demonstration School for School-Based Training, the Provincial Demonstration School for New Curriculum and Textbook Implementation, and the Provincial Experimental School for Deepening Curriculum Reform.

Jiang Jiajun was selected for the provincial Hundred-Thousand-Ten Thousand Talent Training Program for primary and secondary school teachers and leads a municipal studio for distinguished head teachers. Jin Keming, Liao Huixian, and Li Yuezhen serve as directors of municipal distinguished teacher or head teacher studios.

The school has also established the Qichao Academy to support the cultivation of innovative talents.

== Achievements ==
In the National Higher Education Entrance Examination (Gaokao), the school has reported that more than 800 students per year have met the provincial key university admission cutoff (Special Control Line) in recent years. In 2024, 826 students reached the Special Control Line, and the undergraduate admission rate was reported to be close to 100%. Recently, the school has produced 5 provincial top scorers and more than 10 single-subject provincial top scorers in the College Entrance Examination. More than 40 graduates have been admitted to Peking University and Tsinghua University.

Students have received 285 provincial-level or higher awards in academic competitions and 193 national-level awards in science and innovation events. In 2025, Cen Junyi won first prize in the Guangdong Division of the National High School Mathematics League.

Since 2020, seven students have been selected for the Air Force Pilot Recruitment Program. The school has been designated as a Provincial Aerospace Education Characteristic School.

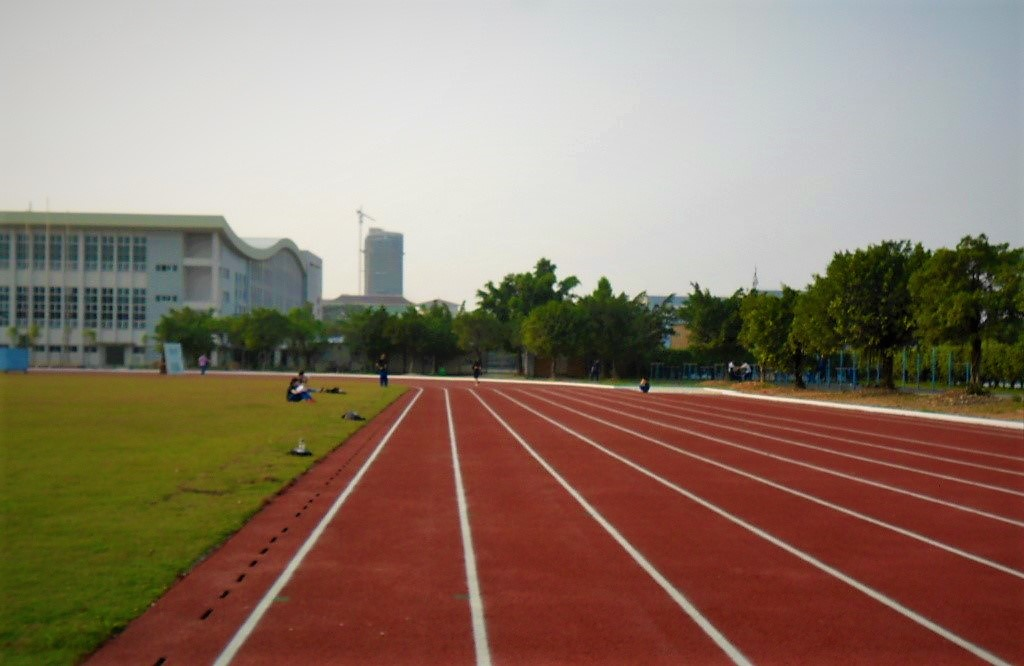
Playground

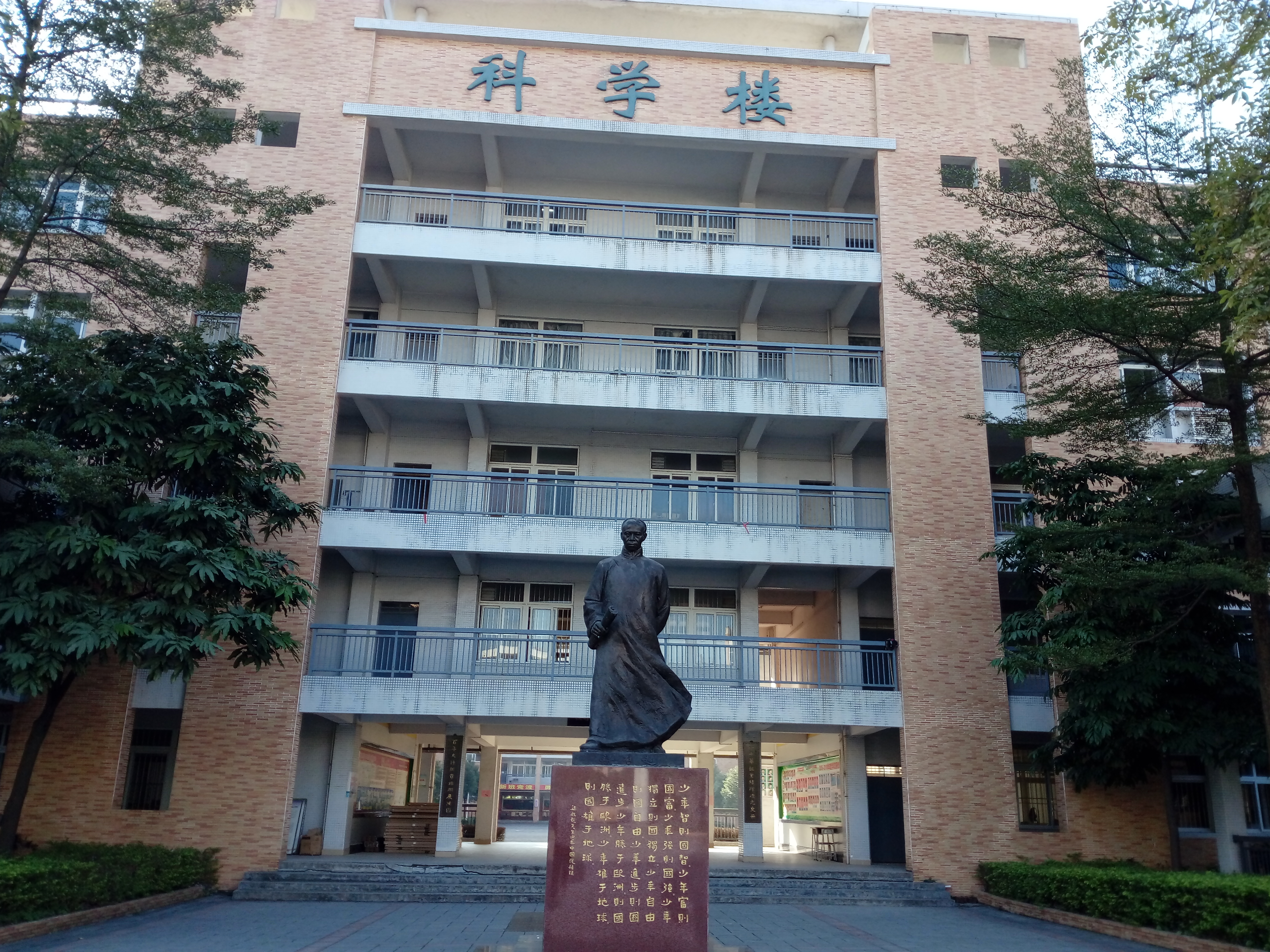
Science Building and the Statue of Liang Qichao

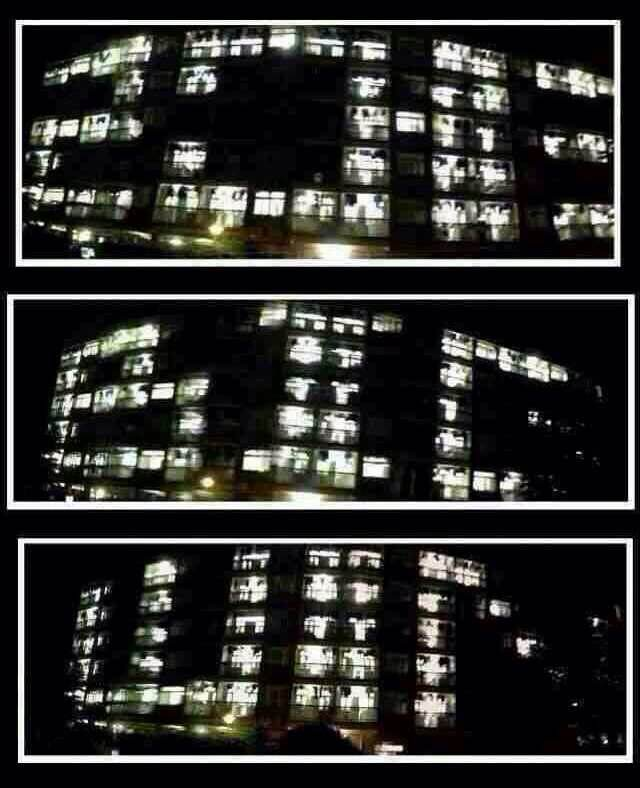
Lights-out Ceremony – 2013 BIG WIN

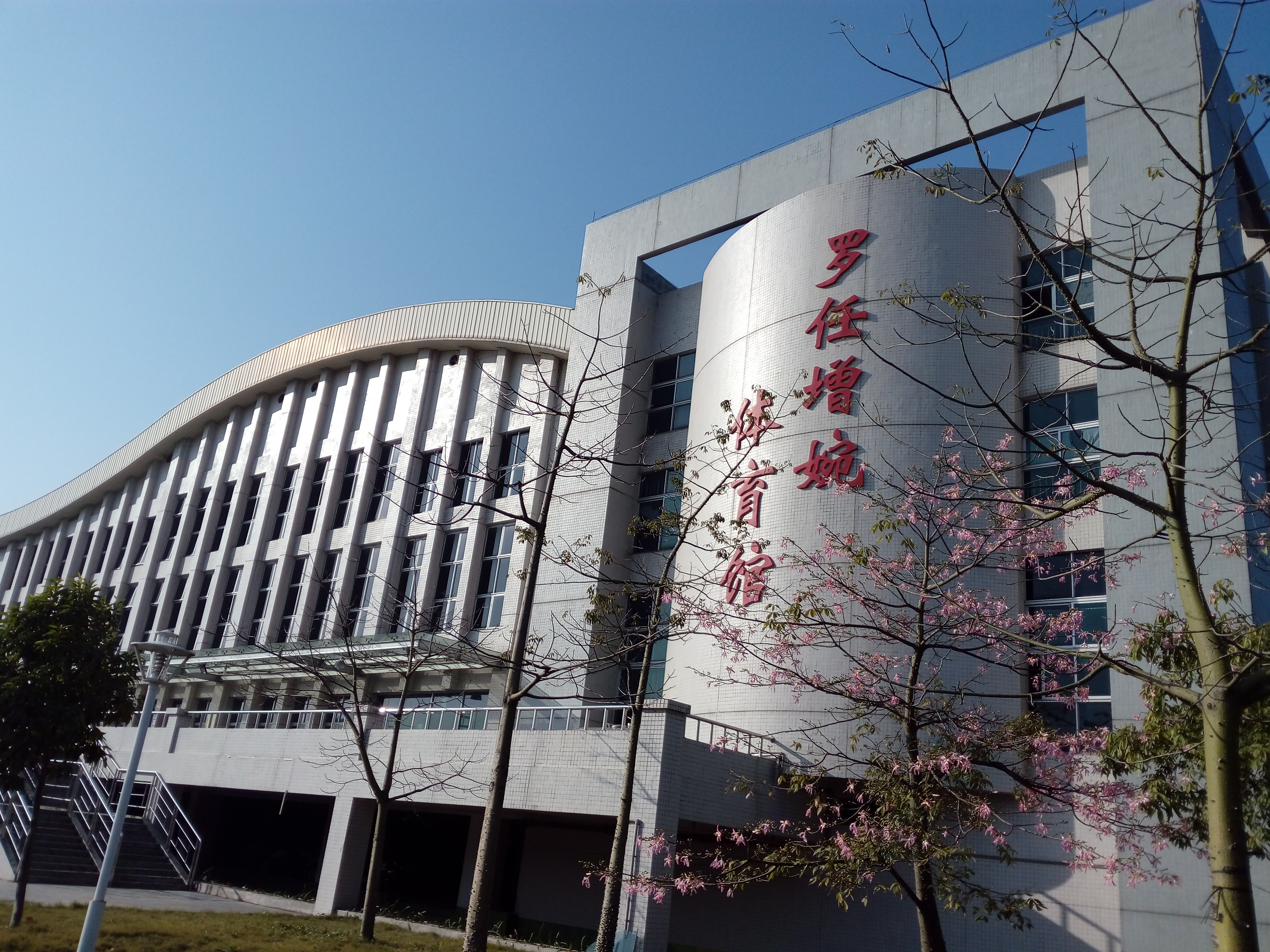
Luo Ren Zengwan Gymnasium

== Extracurricular life ==
=== Student Clubs ===
There are 28 student clubs in Jiangmen No.1 Middle School at present, which are all managed by the Associations Union. Besides some conventional clubs, such as Student's Union, Television Station, Broadcasting Station and Literature Club, JMYZ also supports students to organize recreational groups, such as, Anime Club, Planetary Research Club, Taekwondo Club, Photography Club, etc. Furthermore, every year, there are some campus cultural activities organized by students, such as National Model United Nations (NMUN), The Talent Star Competition, 326 Association Party and so on.

=== Regular Activities ===
==== Sports Meeting ====
The sports meeting is held in October of every year, and it has been successfully held for 54 times up to 2025.

==== Red May Singing Contest ====
The Red May Singing Contest is a choir contest held in May of every year with each class competing together as a unit.

==== One-Hundred-Day Oath-taking Ceremony and Adult Ceremony ====
It is held at 100 days before the NHEEE to stimulate senior 3 students to study hard.

==== Anniversary Celebration ====
Since 2010, large-scale activities are held in December every five years to celebrate the anniversary. Thousands of alumni are welcomed back to JMYZ.

==== Lights-out Ceremony ====
It is spontaneously organized by students in May for senior 3 students who will take the coming NHEEE. To cheer up candidates, brief encouraging words was presented on the wall through utilizing the lights of dormitories orderly. There are different showing words in different year, but in the same format, such as 2013 BIG WIN, 2014 HUG SKY, 2015 FLY HIGH, 2016 NON STOP, 2025 REACH TOP.

== Sister schools ==
- United States California John W.North High School
- China Jiangmen Jingxian Middle School
- China Guangdong Fuquan Olympic School
