= Fuquan =

Fuquan may refer to:

- Fuquan, Guizhou (福泉市), county-level city
- Fuquan, Zhejiang (福全镇), town in Shaoxing County
- Fuquan Township, Fujian (富泉乡), in Yongtai County
- Fuquan Township, Sichuan (富泉乡), in Hanyuan County
- Fuquan (prince) (福全), a Manchu noble of the Qing dynasty
- Fuquan Olympic School (福泉奥林匹克学校), in Jiangmen, Guangdong
