= Boren Sino-Canadian School =

International school in Guangdong, China

- 广东中加柏仁学校

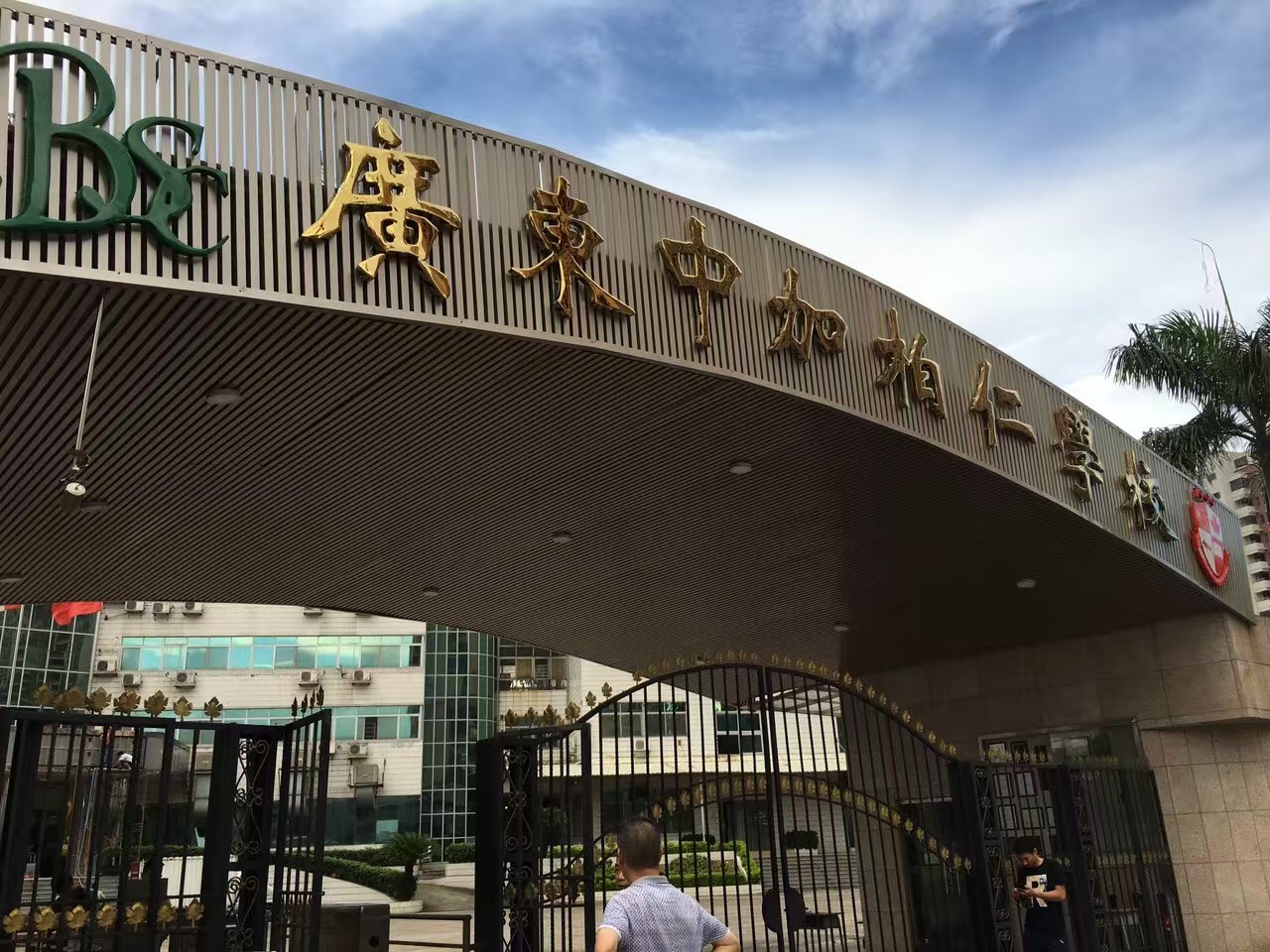

Location
- 65 Shuanglong Ave; Pengjiang District; Jiangmen, Guangdong, 529000; China; 22°36′21.8″N 113°03′52.1″E

Information
- Type: Private, Comprehensive, International, Primary, Secondary
- Established: 1999; 27 years ago
- School district: Jiangmen, Guangdong
- Principal: Domenic P. Sbrocchi
- Grades: 1-12
- Education system: Ontario Secondary School Diploma
- Campus size: 254,952 metres (836,457 ft)
- Website: http://www.borenschool.com

Boren Sino-Canadian School
- Traditional Chinese: 廣東中加柏仁學校
- Simplified Chinese: 广东中加柏仁学校
Transcriptions
Standard Mandarin
- Hanyu Pinyin: Guǎngdōng Zhōngjiā Bórén Xuéxiào
Yue: Cantonese
- Jyutping: gwong2 dung1 zung1 gaa1 paak3 jan4 hok6 haau6

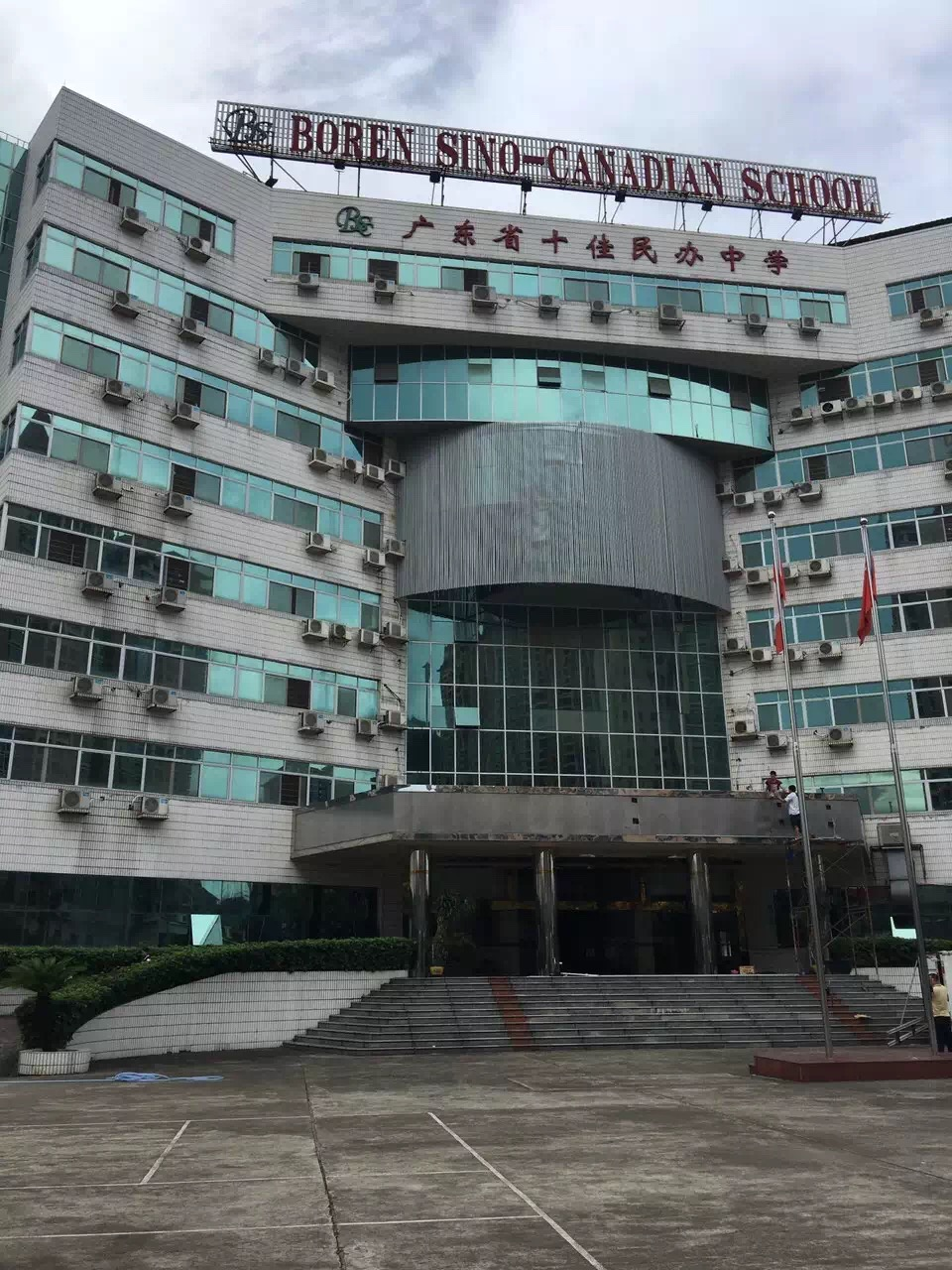
The eight-storey dormitory

Boren Sino-Canadian School (BSC; Chinese: 广东中加柏仁学校) is an international school in Jiangmen, Guangdong. The school, which opened in 1999, educates over 1100 students from Year 1 to Year 12 from more than 30 nationalities.

The school provides its students with learning options that include both a Chinese curriculum and a curriculum from Ontario, Canada recognized by Canada's Ontario Secondary School Diploma (OSSD), allowing students to earn diplomas from both systems. Boren is one of only 20 Ontario schools that have been granted overseas status under an agreement with the Ministry of Education in Ontario, Canada.

The campus has an outdoor track and field, a playground, as well as basketball, volleyball, and tennis courts.

Boren Sino-Canadian School was named one of the top ten private middle schools in Guangdong in December 2003. Since then, the school has grown in popularity throughout the province.

== Curriculum ==
The school follows two different curricula, mainly the Chinese (Hong Kong) and the Ontario Secondary School Diploma. Students who graduate with an OSSD diploma can study at universities all over the world, usually without having to take any additional exams.

The school offers education from Year 1 to Year 12. The primary curriculum is based on the local Chinese (Hong Kong) Curriculum that is widely used in Guangdong province. Students in Year 7-9 may choose to follow the local Chinese (Hong Kong) curriculum or the Ontario Elementary Curriculum depending on their language preferences. In High School, the program begins to narrow in order prepare students to enter post secondary studies. Students in Year 10-12 follows the Ontario Secondary School Diploma.

Chinese is also taught to Primary students, Elementary students, and students in Years 10-12 as an elective.

== Gallery ==
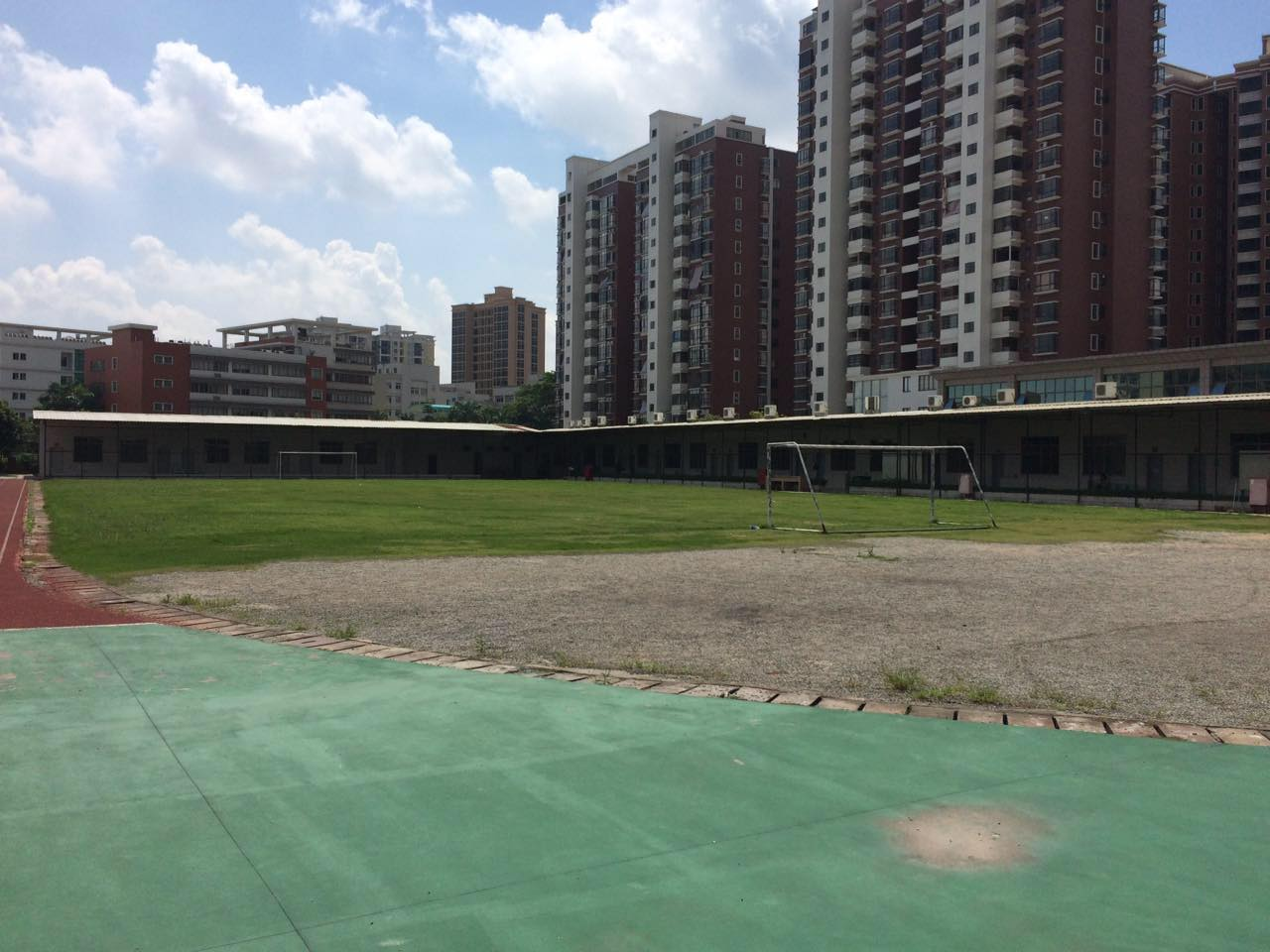
Soccer Field and Running Tracks
