= Waihai Subdistrict =

Subdistrict of Guangdong Province, China

Coordinates: 22.5950°N 113.1514°E

- Simplified Chinese: 外海街道
Transcriptions
Standard Mandarin
- Hanyu Pinyin: Wàihǎi Jiēdào

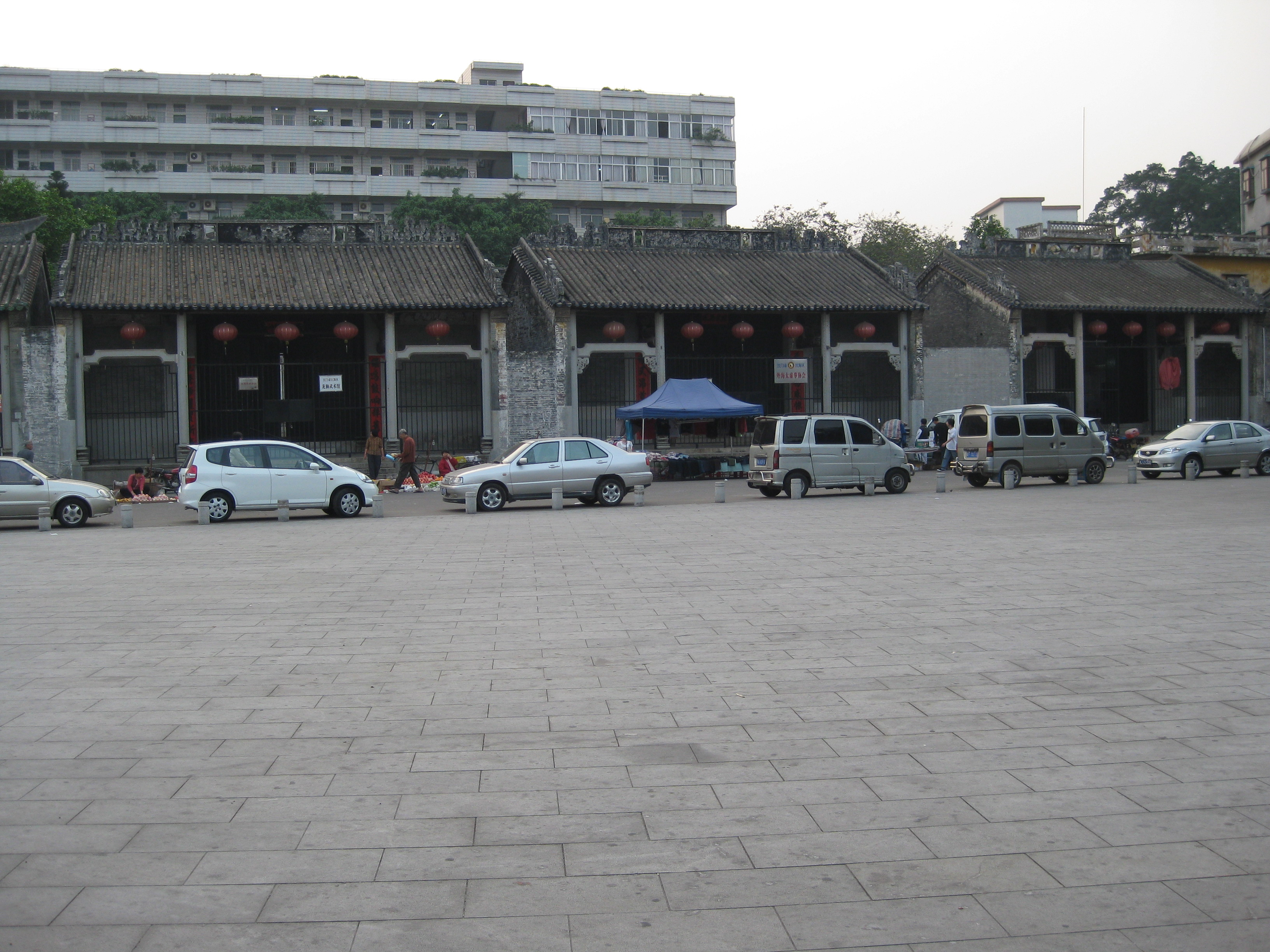

Waihai is a subdistrict of the Jianghai District in Jiangmen City, Guangdong Province, southern China.
