= Guifeng Mountain =

Mountain in the Pearl River Delta, Xinhui, Jiangmen, China

Guifeng Shan
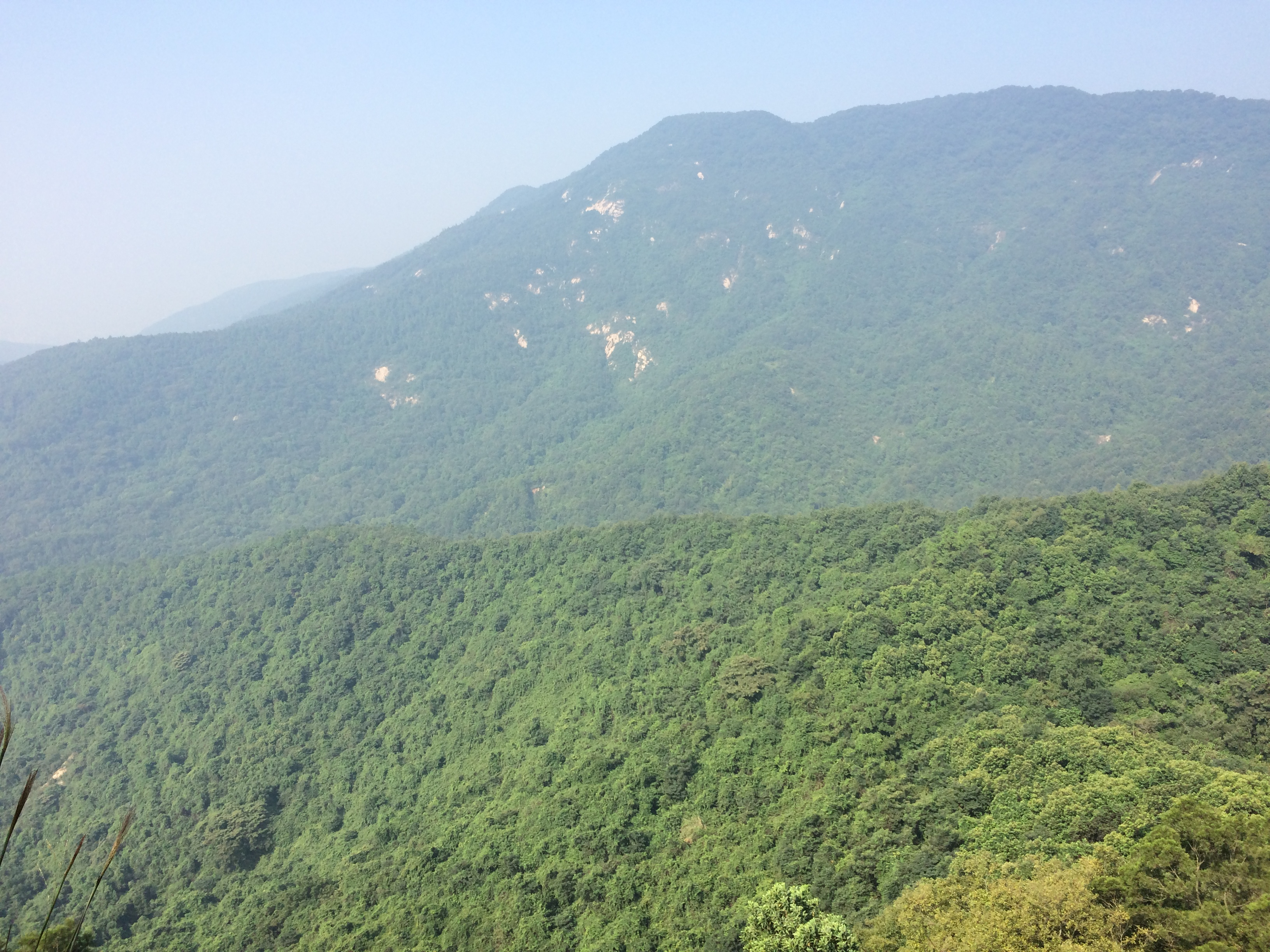
- Halfway through the top of Mount. Guifeng

Highest point
- Elevation: 545 m (1,788 ft)

Geography
- Location: Xinhui, Guangdong, China

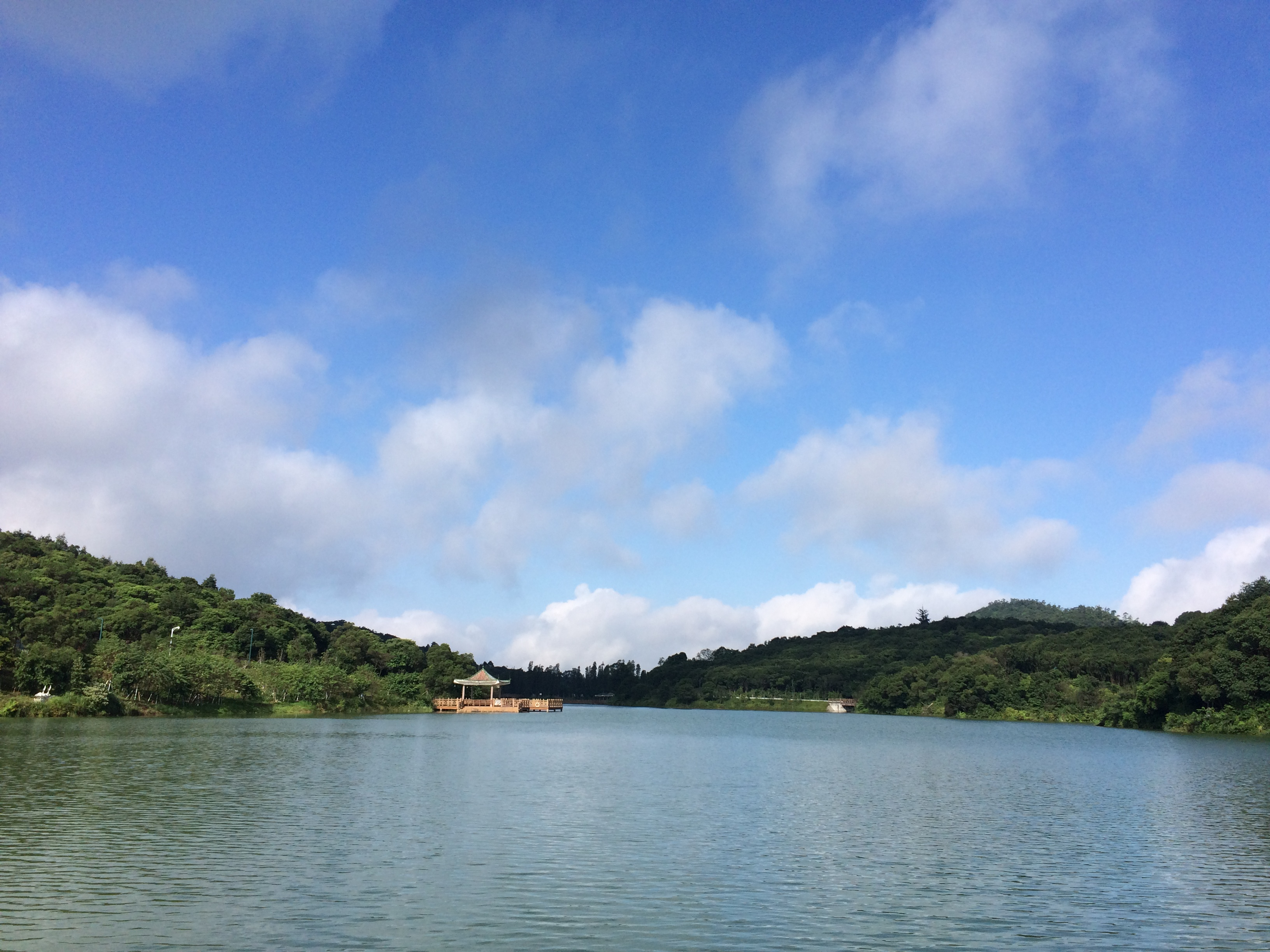
Tianehu Lake at the top of Mount. Guifeng

Guifeng Mountain, Guifeng Shan, or Mount Guifeng (simplified Chinese: 圭峰山) is a mountain in the south-western part of Pearl River Delta in the city of Xinhui, Jiangmen. Covering a total area of 55.1 square kilometer, with an elevation of 545 meters above sea level, is a national 4A level tourist area. Guifeng Mountain is a well-known scenic area in Guangdong province.

== Scenery ==
Guifeng Mountain currently has 8 developed sightseeing area, with 1 flower park still under construction. Sightseeing areas include but not limited to: YuHu ChunXiao Garden, Yutai Bell Pavilion, Taoyuan Greenland, Longtan Waterfall, Shanding Scenic Area, Qianxian Guomai Lake, Tianehu Lake, and Chuilui Park.
