= Fuquan Olympic School =

Coordinates: 22.62683°N 113.03242°E

Fuquan Olympic School 福泉奥林匹克学校
- No.63, Fuquan Road, Duruan Town 杜阮镇福泉路63号; Jiangmen, Guangdong; China

Information
- Type: Private School, Co-educational, Kindergarten to Middle School, Day School and Boarding School
- Founded: March 1998
- Founder: Chen Jiping (陈基平)
- Principal: Luo JinHong (罗金宏)
- Enrolment: 1500 Students
- Colors: Red, Blue and White
- Website: jmfortune.com

Fuquan Olympic School (traditional Chinese: 福泉奧林匹克學校; simplified Chinese: 福泉奥林匹克学校) is a co-educational, private school, located in the town of Duruan in Jiangmen, Guangdong Province, People's Republic of China. The current principal is Mr. Jinhong Luo (罗金宏) with an enrolment of approximately 1500 students from kindergarten to junior high school. Geographically, the school covers an area of 31,209 square meters, nestled within the surrounding hills of the Great Xikeng forest.

== Campus ==
Fuquan has 33 classes from kindergarten to junior high school. The campus boasts a number of basketball courts, volleyball courts, badminton courts, a 300-meter track and a soccer field, a swimming pool and an indoor gymnasium.

== Academics and awards ==
Fuquan has a strong tradition in mathematics competitions. The school has been designated by the Chinese Ministry of Education as an "Experimental School for the Reform of English-Language Education at the Elementary Level" (教育部小学英语教育改革实验学校), and is classified as a First-Rank School in Jiangmen (江门市一级学校).
