= Jianghai, Jiangmen =

Jianghai 江海区
- District
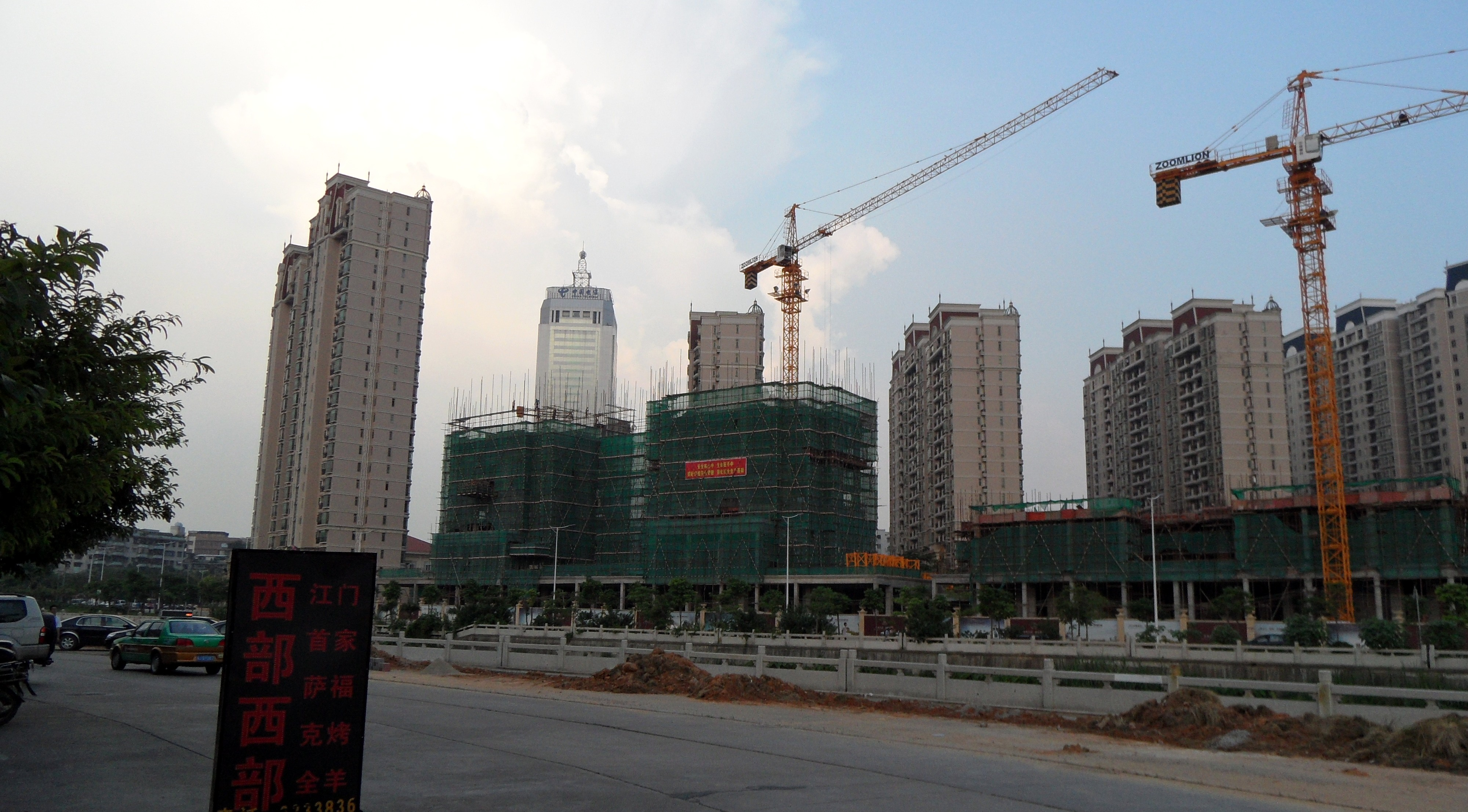

- Location in Guangdong
- Coordinates: 22°34′37″N 113°08′48″E
- Country: People's Republic of China
- Province: Guangdong
- Prefecture-level city: Jiangmen

Area
  - Total: 107 km^{2} (41 sq mi)

Population (2020)
  - Total: 364,694
  - Density: 3,410/km^{2} (8,830/sq mi)
- Time zone: UTC+8 (China Standard)

Jianghai (Chinese: 江海区; pinyin: Jiānghǎi Qū; Jyutping: gong^{1}hoi^{2}keoi^{1}) is a district of Jiangmen City, Guangdong Province, southern China.

== Administrative divisions ==
The Jianghai District is responsible for the administration of three subdistricts:

Name	Chinese (S)	Hanyu Pinyin	Canton Romanization	Population (2010)
Jiangnan Subdistrict	江南街道	Jiāngnán Jiēdào	gong1 naam4 san1 cyun1	77,035
Waihai Subdistrict	外海街道	Wàihǎi Jiēdào	ngoi6 hoi2 zan3	94,666
Lile Subdistrict	礼乐街道	Lǐlè Jiēdào	lai5 ngok6 gaai1 dou6	82,612

- Jiaobei Subdistrict & Jiaotou Subdistrict were merged into Jiangnan Subdistrict on 31 July 2015
