= Jiangmen =

Jiangmen 江门市 Kongmoon; Chiangmen
- Prefecture-level city
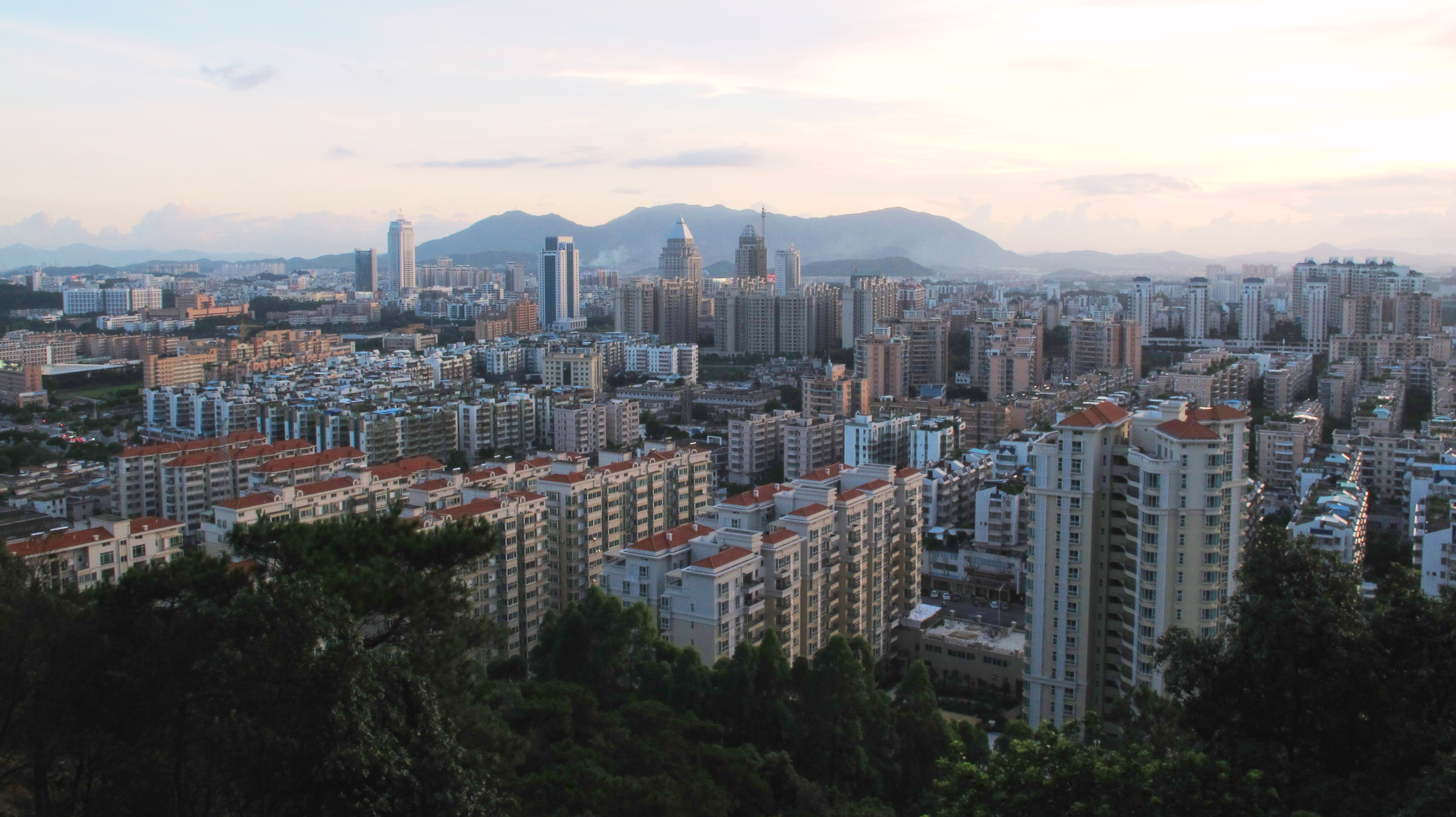
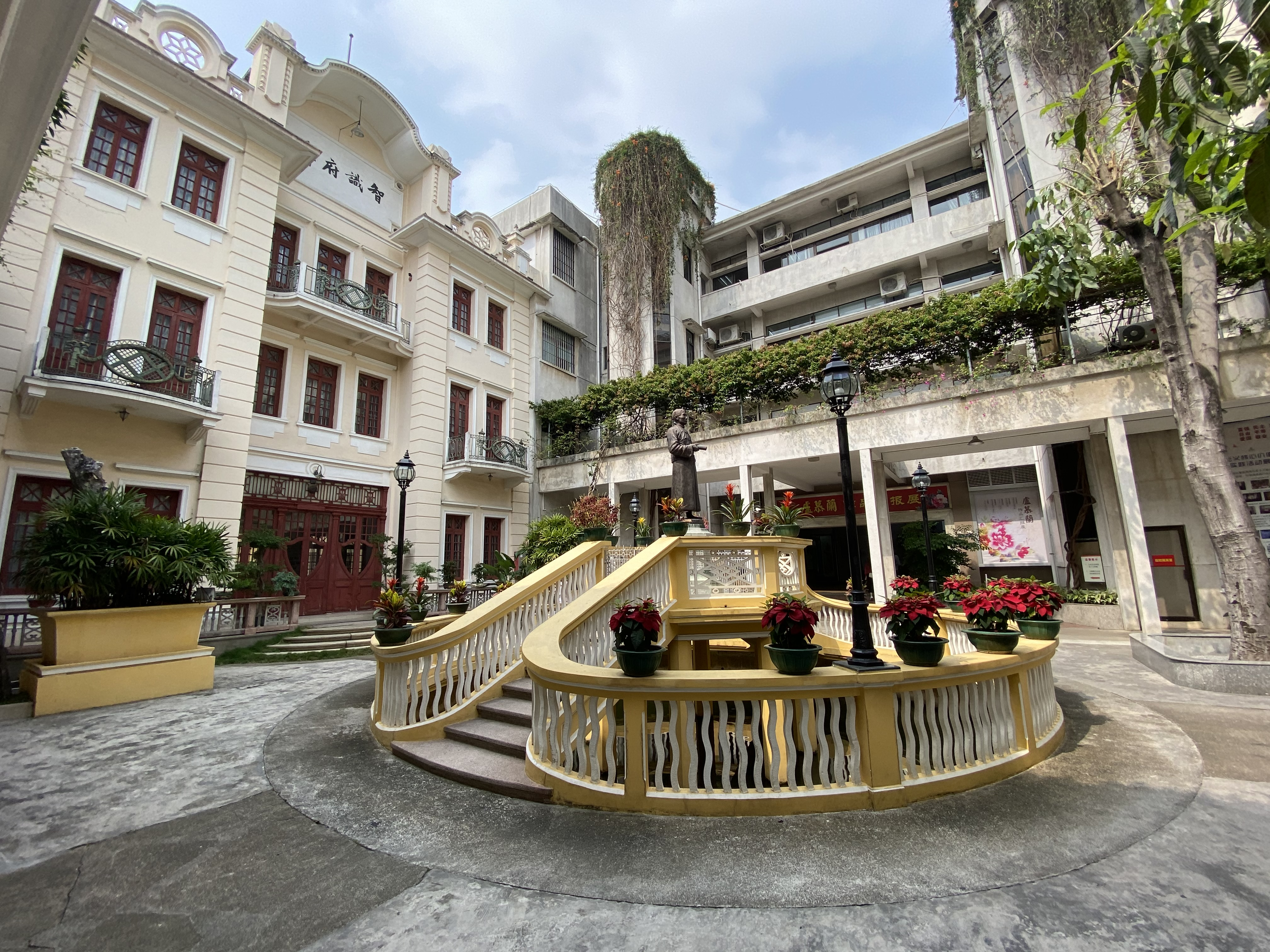
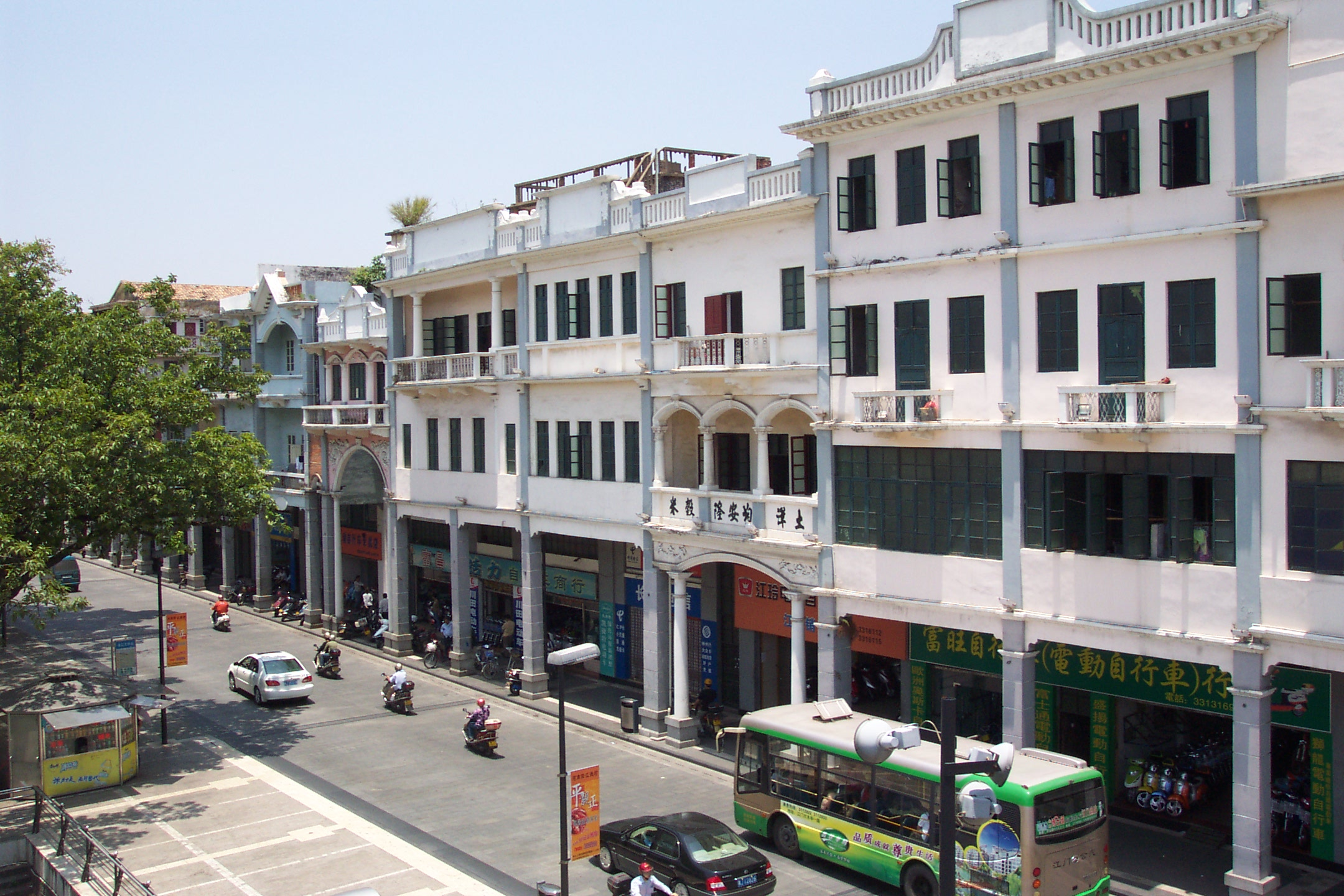
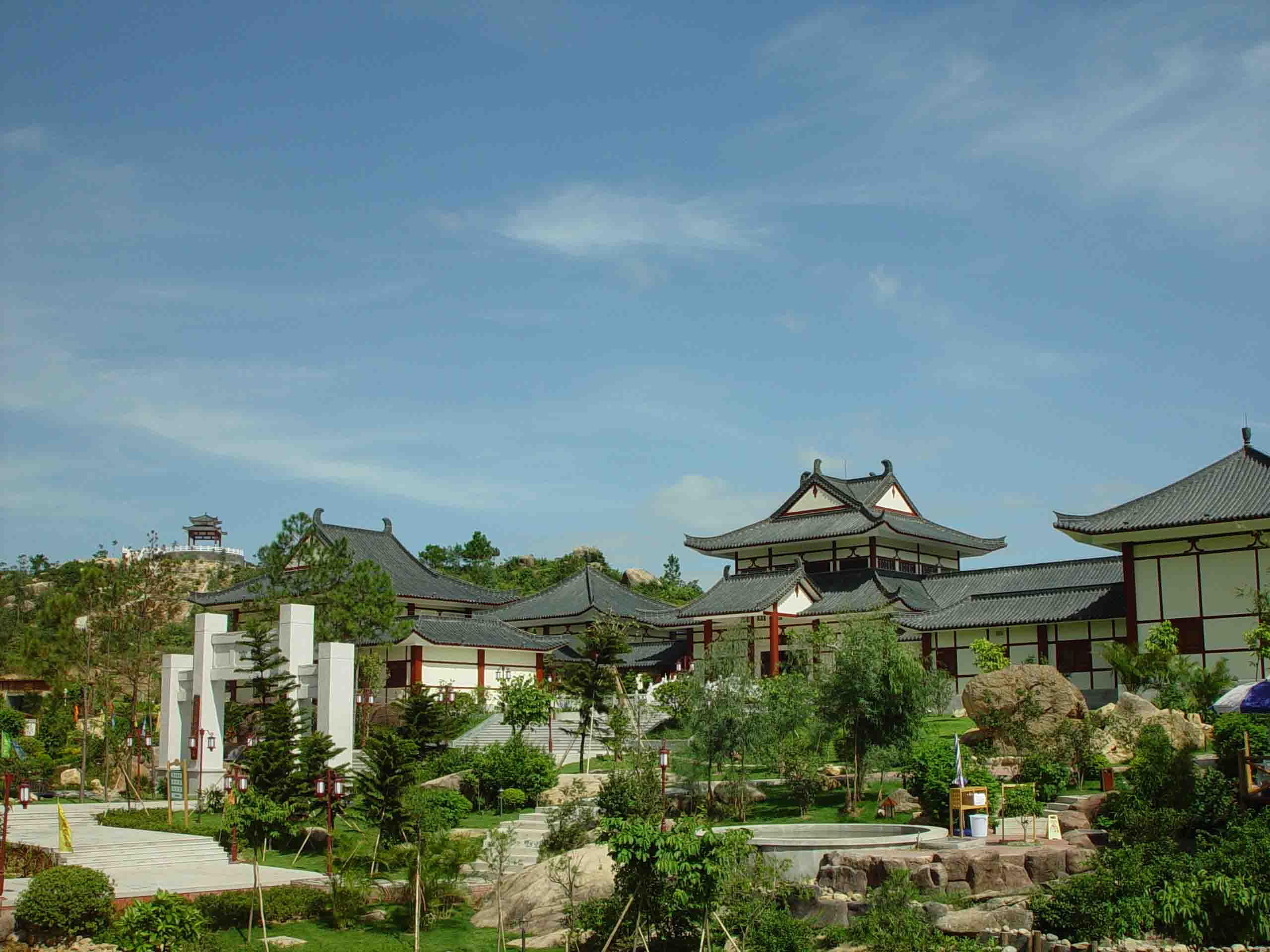
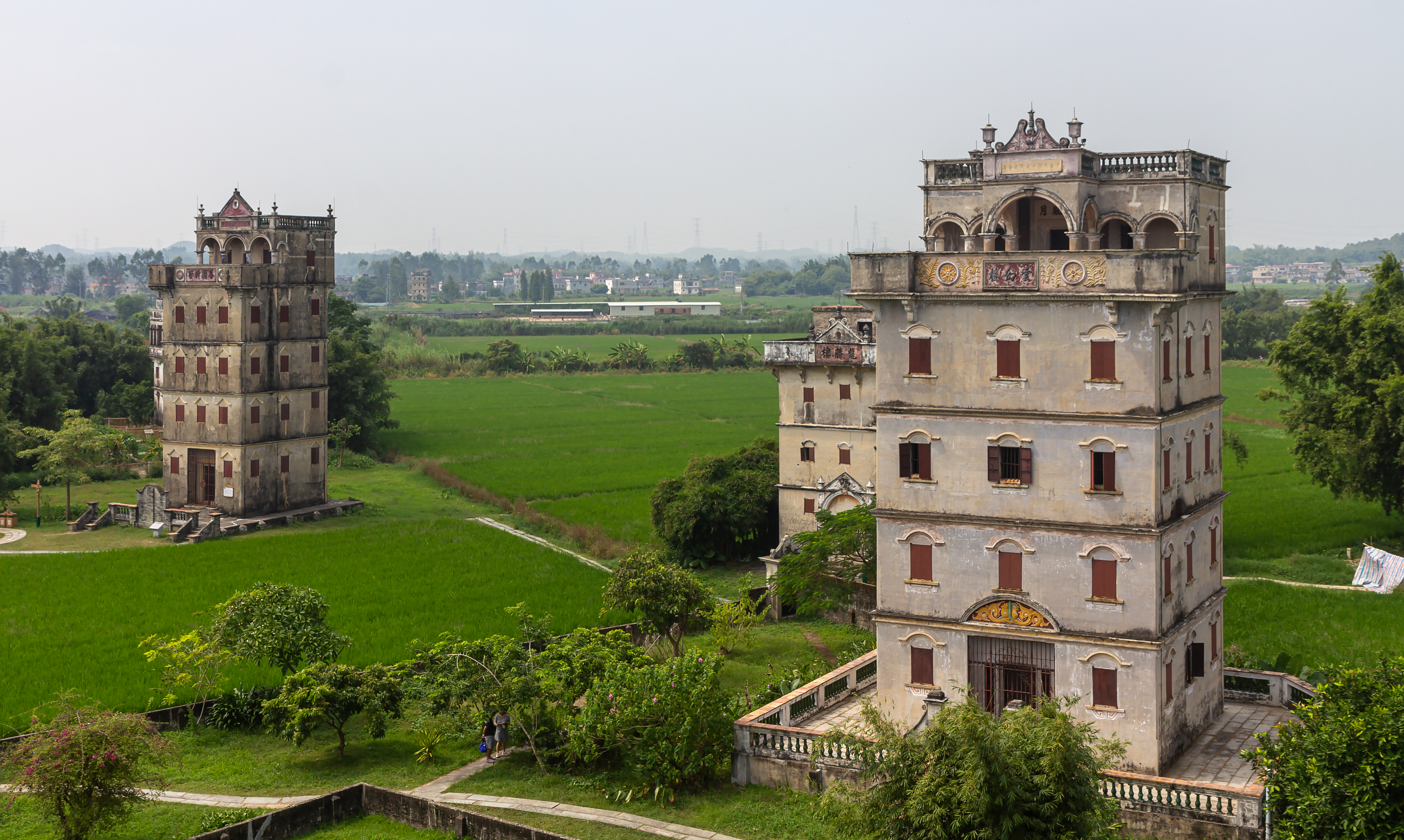
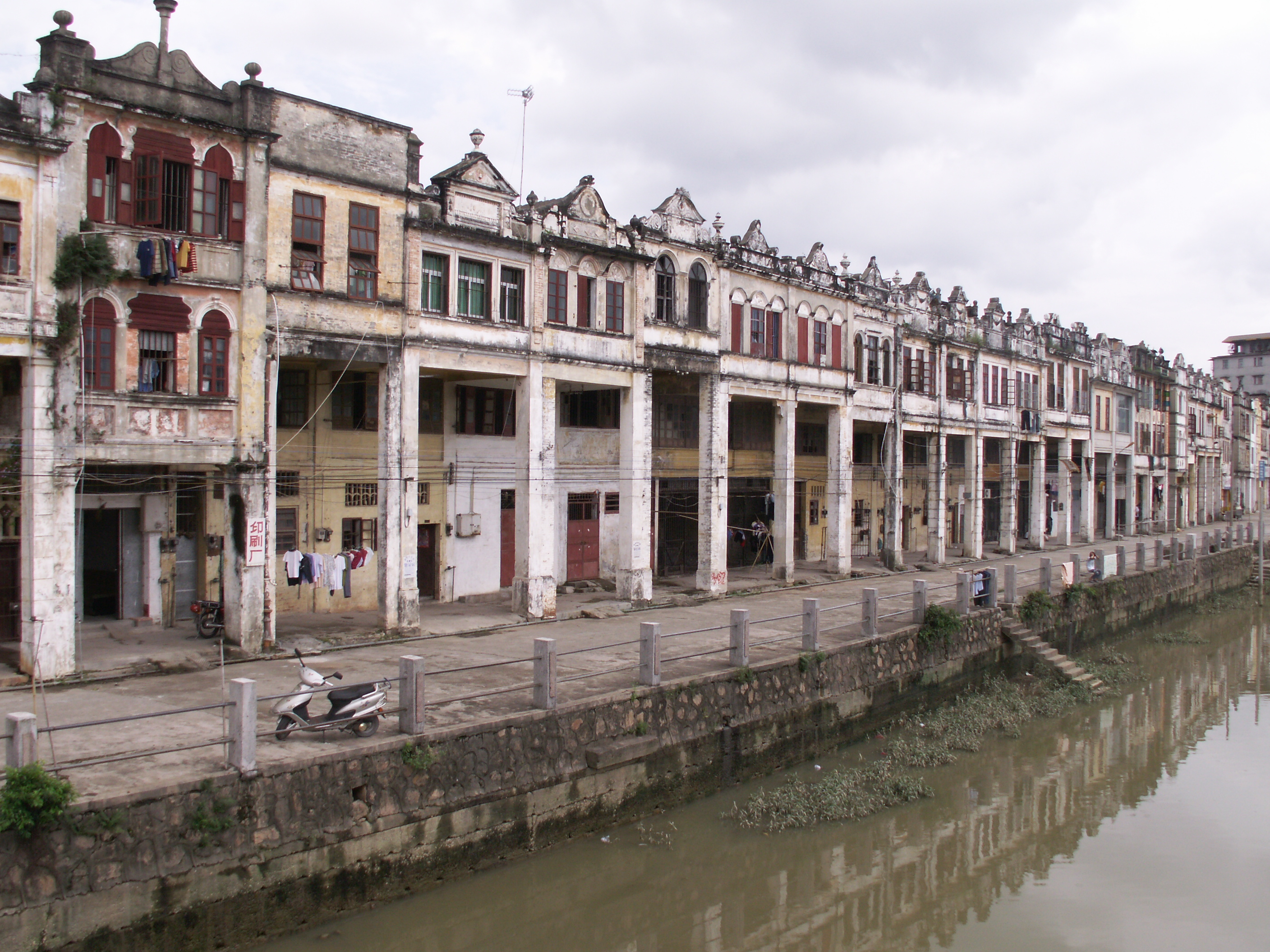
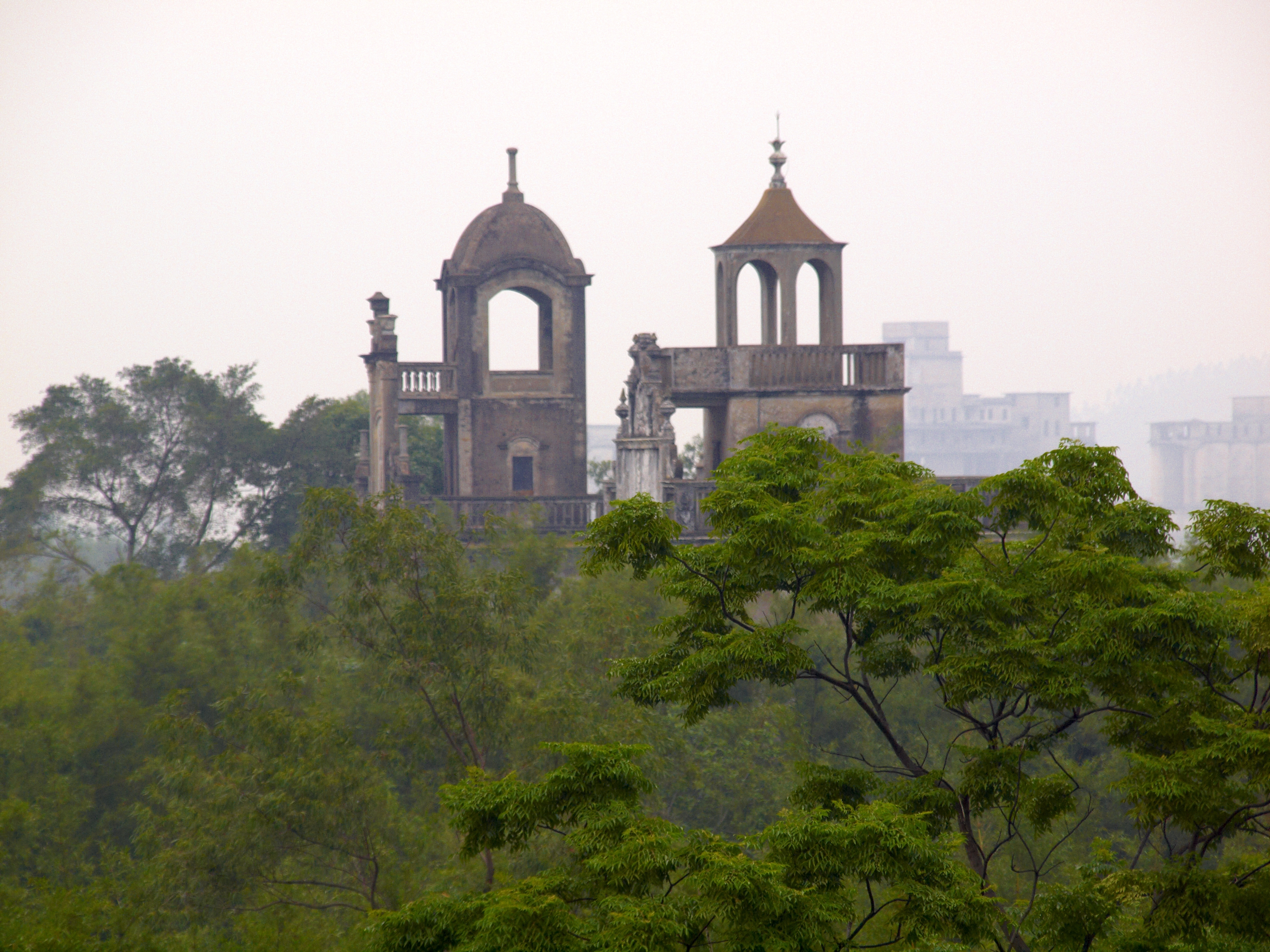
- Pengjiang District Jingtang Library Changdi Lu Gudou Hotspring Resort Kaiping Diaolou and Villages Chikan Dixi Lu riverfront Majianglong Diaolou

- Location of Jiangmen in Guangdong
- Interactive map of Jiangmen
- Location in China
- Coordinates (Jiangmen municipal government): 22°34′44″N 113°04′53″E
- Country: People's Republic of China
- Province: Guangdong
- City Seat: Pengjiang District

Area
  - Prefecture-level city: 9,535.0 km^{2} (3,681.5 sq mi)
  - Urban: 566.0 km^{2} (218.5 sq mi)
  - Metro: 20,968.7 km^{2} (8,096.1 sq mi)
- Elevation: 10 m (33 ft)

Population (2020 census)
  - Prefecture-level city: 4,798,090
  - Density: 503.21/km^{2} (1,303.3/sq mi)
  - Urban: 1,289,800
  - Urban density: 2,279/km^{2} (5,902/sq mi)
  - Metro: 14,258,694
  - Metro density: 679.999/km^{2} (1,761.19/sq mi)

GDP
  - Prefecture-level city: CN¥ 360 billion US$ 55.8 billion
  - Per capita: CN¥ 74,722; US$ 11,582
- Time zone: UTC+8 (China Standard Time)
- Postal code: 529000
- Area code: 750
- ISO 3166 code: CN-GD-07
- License plate prefixes: 粤J
- Website: www.jiangmen.gov.cn (in Chinese)

Jiangmen
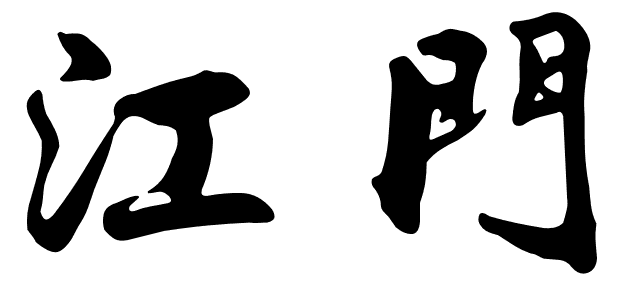
- "Jiangmen" in Chinese calligraphy
- Simplified Chinese: 江门
- Traditional Chinese: 江門
- Postal: Kongmoon
- Literal meaning: River Gate
Transcriptions
Standard Mandarin
- Hanyu Pinyin: Jiāngmén
- Wade–Giles: Chiang¹-men²
Yue: Cantonese
- Yale Romanization: Gōngmùhn
- Jyutping: Gong¹-mun⁴

Jiangmen (Chinese: 江门), alternately romanized in Cantonese as Kongmoon, is a prefecture-level city in Guangdong Province in southern China. It consists of three urban districts (Pengjiang, Jianghai, Xinhui), Heshan, and the more rural Siyi (Xinhui, Taishan, Kaiping, and Enping), which is the ancestral homeland (侨乡, qiao'xiang) of approximately 4 million overseas Chinese. As of the 2020 census, Jiangmen had a total population of about 4,798,090. Its urban region, consisting of Pengjiang, Jianghai, and Heshan, had 2,657,062 inhabitants.

== Names ==
Jiangmen is the pinyin romanization of the Chinese name 江門 or 江门, based on its pronunciation in the Mandarin dialect. Its former Wade-Giles spelling was Chiang-men. The Chinese postal romanization spelling "Kongmoon" was based upon the same name's Cantonese pronunciation Gong¹-moon⁴. Other forms of the name include Kongmoon, Kongmun, and Kiangmoon.

Jiangmen is also known as Pengjiang. Its rural hinterland is known to the Chinese diaspora as the "Four Counties(四邑)", although the addition of Heshan to Jiangmen has prompted the remaining locals to begin calling it the "Five Counties(五邑)" instead.

== History ==
Jiangmen was forced to open up to western trade in 1904, after a 1902 declaration which made it a treaty port. During the subsequent period of global influence, a number of western-style buildings were constructed along the city's waterfront, especially in Chikan, and currently, the city's government is partaking in a renewal project to restore many of these buildings. Many were constructed by returned Overseas Chinese merchants, who used them as headquarters for newly-established chambers of commerce as well as housing.

On 6 August 1925, the Guangdong provincial government placed Jiangmen under direct administration of the provincial government. Jiangmen was given a city government on 26 November of the same year. In 1931, this status would be revoked, and the city was placed under the administration of Xinhui County.

The city was incorporated into the People's Republic of China on 23 October 1949, and was proclaimed a city in 1951. The city later became the prefectural seat for the Sze Yup ("Four County") region including Taishan, Kaiping, Xinhui, Enping. In mainland China but not abroad, the area became known as the "Five Counties" when Heshan was added to Jiangmen's jurisdiction.

In June 1983, the city was upgraded to a prefecture-level city.

In 2011, the city banned pet dogs in public after rabies killed 42 people over the preceding 3 years. The city reserved a 13-acre site to allow rural Chinese to adopt the 30,000 dogs, but public outcry led to a softer implementation where violators would be told to leave rather than have the dog confiscated.

In 2017, Jiangmen Hi-tech Industrial Development Zone ranked 64th among national hi-tech zones in China.

In 2020, Jiangmen Station of the West Pearl River Delta Transportation Center opened to the public.

== Geography ==
The city is located on the lower reaches of the Xi River and the Tan River, in the western section of the Pearl River Delta in the middle of southern Guangdong Province. It faces the South China Sea in the south and is 100 kilometres (62 mi) away from Guangzhou and Zhuhai by highway. Jiangmen city has an area of 9,535 square kilometres (3,681 sq mi), about one quarter the size of the Pearl River Delta.

=== Climate ===
The climate is subtropical with monsoonal influences. The annual average temperature is 22.36 °C (72.25 °F), with extremes since 1957 ranging from 0.1 °C (32.2 °F) on 16 January 1963 to 38.4 °C (101.1 °F) on 31 May 2023.

Climate data for Jiangmen (Xinhui District), elevation 36 m (118 ft), (1991–2020 normals, extremes 1957–present)
Month	Jan	Feb	Mar	Apr	May	Jun	Jul	Aug	Sep	Oct	Nov	Dec	Year
Record high °C (°F)	27.8 (82.0)	29.9 (85.8)	32.1 (89.8)	34.0 (93.2)	38.4 (101.1)	37.6 (99.7)	38.3 (100.9)	37.7 (99.9)	37.4 (99.3)	35.9 (96.6)	32.4 (90.3)	32.0 (89.6)	38.4 (101.1)
Mean daily maximum °C (°F)	18.3 (64.9)	19.8 (67.6)	22.3 (72.1)	26.4 (79.5)	30.0 (86.0)	31.8 (89.2)	32.7 (90.9)	32.7 (90.9)	31.4 (88.5)	28.7 (83.7)	24.7 (76.5)	20.0 (68.0)	26.6 (79.8)
Daily mean °C (°F)	14.6 (58.3)	16.0 (60.8)	18.8 (65.8)	22.8 (73.0)	26.2 (79.2)	28.1 (82.6)	28.8 (83.8)	28.6 (83.5)	27.6 (81.7)	25.1 (77.2)	20.9 (69.6)	16.3 (61.3)	22.8 (73.1)
Mean daily minimum °C (°F)	11.9 (53.4)	13.5 (56.3)	16.3 (61.3)	20.4 (68.7)	23.6 (74.5)	25.5 (77.9)	25.9 (78.6)	25.8 (78.4)	24.9 (76.8)	22.3 (72.1)	18.1 (64.6)	13.5 (56.3)	20.1 (68.2)
Record low °C (°F)	0.1 (32.2)	2.5 (36.5)	3.3 (37.9)	8.6 (47.5)	15.4 (59.7)	18.0 (64.4)	22.3 (72.1)	21.8 (71.2)	16.6 (61.9)	10.7 (51.3)	4.9 (40.8)	1.8 (35.2)	0.1 (32.2)
Average precipitation mm (inches)	43.2 (1.70)	41.3 (1.63)	67.6 (2.66)	160.5 (6.32)	273.5 (10.77)	335.5 (13.21)	271.2 (10.68)	301.4 (11.87)	207.7 (8.18)	72.2 (2.84)	34.2 (1.35)	31.8 (1.25)	1,840.1 (72.46)
Average precipitation days (≥ 0.1 mm)	6.4	9.3	13.2	14.3	17.2	18.9	17.2	17.5	13.5	6.2	5.6	5.3	144.6
Average relative humidity (%)	70	77	81	83	82	83	81	81	77	69	67	64	76
Mean monthly sunshine hours	113.7	88.4	72.6	89.8	134.1	160.4	202.2	188.1	169.6	184.6	159.1	146.0	1,708.6
Percentage possible sunshine	34	27	19	24	33	40	49	48	47	52	48	44	39
Source: China Meteorological Administration all-time extreme temperatureall-time February highall-time March highall-time October record

== Economy ==
Jiangmen was selected by the Chinese state as a pilot city for a nationwide information programme. It was also chosen by the Pacific Economic Cooperation Council (PECC) as a trial city for the Regional Integration for Sustainable Economics (RISE) project. According to the World Bank's "Report on Investment Environment in China" for 2005, Jiangmen was ranked the sixth most conducive city in China for investment.

The economic development strategies within Jiangmen focus on the three urban districts, and the south, middle and north lines. It is planned to develop four main economic areas: the central urban district of the city, the Yinzhou Lake (银州湖; 銀州湖) economic area, and two economic areas along the various transport axes.

In 2018, the city reported a GDP of 290.041 billion Yuan, government revenue totaling 24.393 billion Yuan, and retail sales totaling 140.758 billion Yuan. In 2024, the city reported a GDP of 4022.96 billion Yuan.

=== Manufacturing industries ===
Similar to other cities in the western Pearl River Delta, the manufacturing sector plays a significant role in Jiangmen's economy. The chief industries include manufacturing of New energy, machinery, textiles, paper, food products, electronics, and building materials. Other major industries include high-speed rail, motorcycles, household appliances, food processing, synthetic fibers and garments, and stainless steel products. Global brand names with a presence in the city include BP, Mitsubishi Heavy Industries, Hyundai, Panasonic, Veolia, Hutchison Whampoa, ABB and Tesco. Some worldwide brand which have factories in Jiangmen such include BASF, Asia Pacific Resources International Holdings and Lee Kum Kee foods.

==== Uranium processing plant ====
The city was the proposed site of a $6.5 billion, 40 billion renminbi, uranium processing plant which would have supplied about half of the enriched uranium needed by China's nuclear power plants. Announcement of the plant in July 2013 was met by public protests. The proposal was withdrawn out of "respect for public opinion" shortly thereafter.

=== Jiangmen port ===
Jiangmen Port is the second largest river port in Guangdong province. The local government plans to develop a harbour industrial zone with heavy industries to include petrochemical and machinery plants, as well as an ocean-based economy.

== Administration ==
Administrative divisions of Jiangmen
Division code	English name	Chinese	Pinyin	Area in km^{2}	Population 2010	Seat	Postal code	Divisions			
Division code	English name	Chinese	Pinyin	Area in km^{2}	Population 2010	Seat	Postal code	Subdistricts	Towns	Residential communities	Administrative villages
440700	Jiangmen City	江门市	Jiāngmén Shì	9505.42	4,450,703	Pengjiang District	529000	15	61	264	1051
440703	Pengjiang District	蓬江区	Péngjiāng Qū	321.97	719,146	Huanshi Subdistrict	529000	6	3	84	56
440704	Jianghai District	江海区	Jiānghǎi Qū	109.16	254,313	Jiangnan Subdistrict	529000	3	0	23	36
440705	Xinhui District	新会区	Xīnhuì Qū	1354.72	849,155	Huicheng Subdistrict	529100	1	10	31	193
440781	Taishan City	台山市	Táishān Shì	3286.30	941,095	Taicheng Subdistrict	529200	1	16	36	277
440783	Kaiping City	开平市	Kāipíng Shì	1656.94	699,242	Changsha Subdistrict	529300	2	13	41	226
440784	Heshan City	鹤山市	Hèshān Shì	1082.73	494,938	Shaping Subdistrict	529700	1	9	26	112
440785	Enping City	恩平市	Ēnpíng Shì	1693.60	492,814	Encheng Subdistrict	529400	1	10	23	151

== Culture ==
Jiangmen is the ancestral homeland of approximately 4 million overseas Chinese, who live in 107 countries and regions throughout the world. Strong oversea connections are especially found in the villages. The dialect spoken in Jiangmen city itself is a Siyi Yue dialect, but is distinct from the Taishanese spoken in Taishan City. Every year, A unique dragon dance is performed in water during Pan Village Lantern Festival in Shuikou Town, Kaiping, Jiangmen, Guangdong.

== Tourism ==
A significant amount of historical heritage survives from the period of mass emigration prior to World War II. The most significant are the fortified multi-story towers found mainly in Kaiping. These are known as "Gold Mountain Towers" or diaolou. A number of natural hotspring resorts has been developed successfully by using its wealthy natural heated ground water resources such as Gudou Hotspring Resort (古兜温泉). Guifeng Mountain, a mountain visited by many tourists, is the peak of Jiangmen with an elevation of 545 meters above sea level. Gulao water town, is a better original water town in the Pearl River Delta, known as "Venice of the East".

The local government's economic development strategies emphasize the development of tourism and protection of the environment.

== Education ==
=== Universities and Colleges ===
Wuyi University is the only university which is founded within the city, whereby it's one of the member of Guangdong-Hong Kong-Macao University Alliance (GHMUA). And Guangzhou Huali College Jiangmen campus is also located in the city.

And there are also some Vocational colleges in the city:

- Jiangmen Polytechnic College, located at Chaolian Island, enrolls about 13,000 students in various technical and humanities programs.
- Guangdong Jiangmen Chinese Medicine College
- Guangdong Jiangmen Preschool Normal College
- Guangdong Nanfang Institute of Technology
- Guangdong Vocational College of Post and Telecom (Jiangmen Campus)

=== Secondary Education ===
The only international school in Jiangmen is Boren Sino-Canadian School, while bilingual schools include WuYi Country Garden Bilingual School and China-Hong Kong English School.

Jiangmen No. 1 Middle School is claimed to be the top middle school in the district. It used to be one of the best middle schools in Guangdong Province in the 1980s and 1990s. However, the quality of its education has been dropping in recent years and within the district of Jiangmen, its status is being constantly challenged by schools such as Xinhui No. 1 Middle School in Xinhui, Kaiqiao (Kaiping Emigrant) Middle School in Kiaping and Heshan No.1 Middle School in Heshan.

== Library ==
The Jingtang Library was established in 1925, by an Overseas Chinese founder Fung Ping Shan.

== Transport ==
=== Roads and highways ===
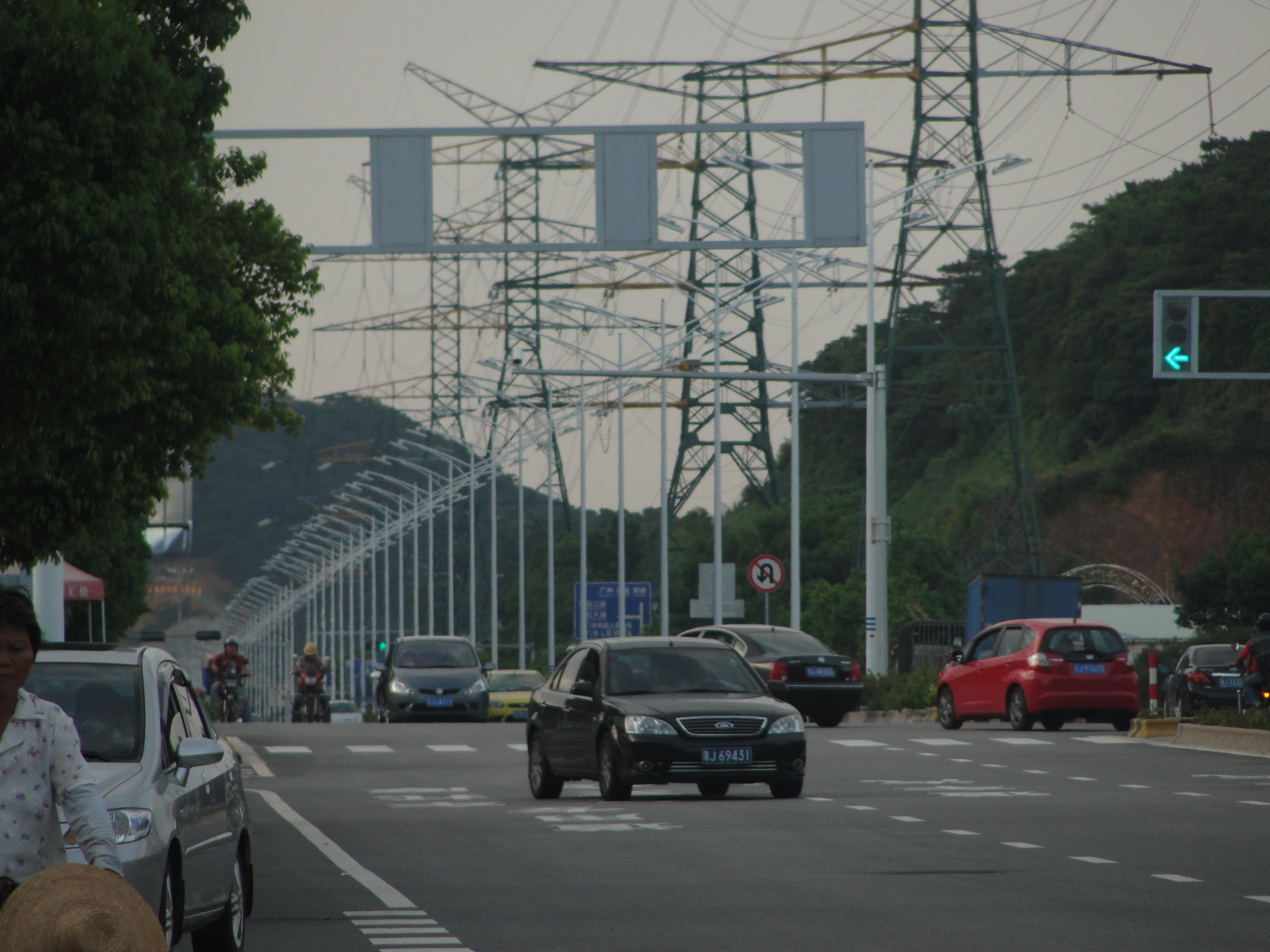
Fengle Road is one of the trunk road linking southern and northern downtown.

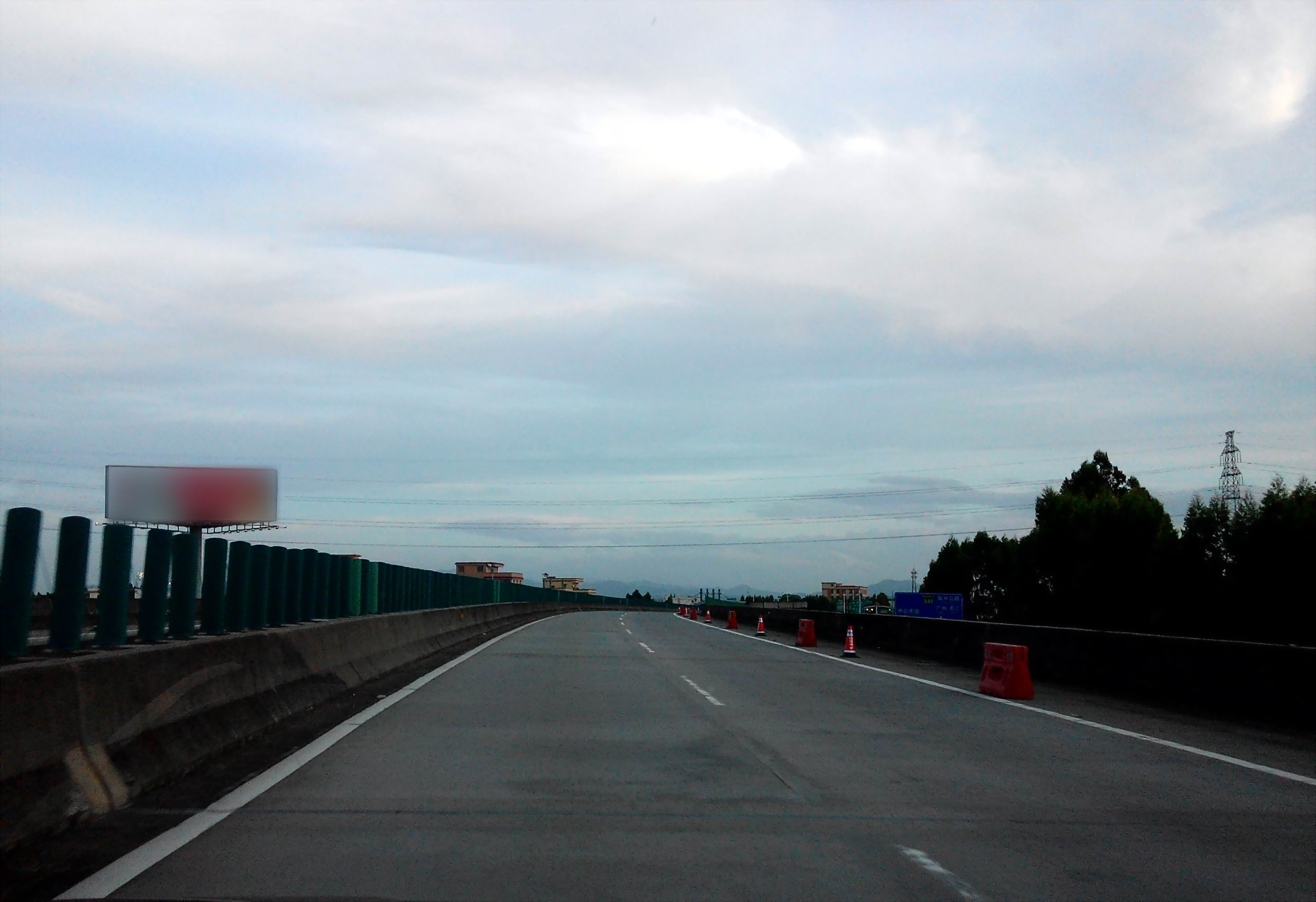
S49 Xinhui-Taishan Expressway

Jiangmen has a mature network of inter-city and intra-city highways and expressways, whose total length has reached 10,084.97 kilometres (6,266.51 mi) as of 2016. G15 Shenyang–Haikou Expressway travels at the north, connecting downtown Jiangmen to three of its administrative divisions Heshan, Kaiping and Enping, as well as nearby cities Yangjiang, Zhongshan and Foshan. S32 Western Coastal Expressway goes along Jiangmen's coastlines, linking Zhuhai at the east and Yangjiang at the west. G94 Pearl River Delta Ring Expressway, S20 Guangzhou-Zhongshan-Jiangmen Expressway, G2518 Shenzhen-Cenxi Expressway and S47 Guangzhou-Foshan-Jiangmen-Zhuhai Expressway run through northeast Jiangmen. S49 Xinhui-Taishan Expressway connects Taishan and joints S32 at the south.

China National Highway 325 is the only highway in the national trunk road system that goes into Jiangmen. Several provincial highways, such as S273, S274, S276 and S367 link the city's suburb areas to major towns.

=== Railways ===
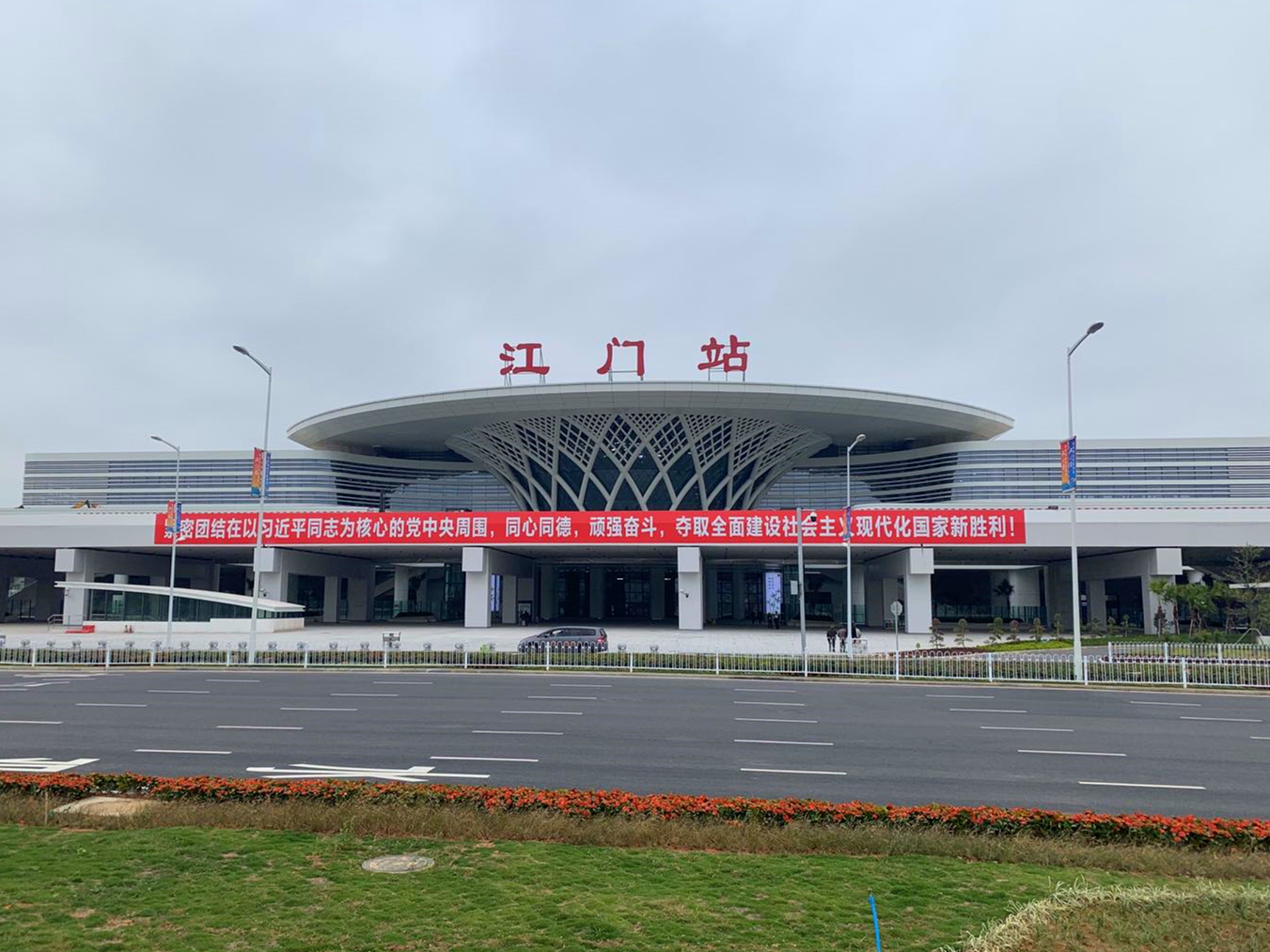
Jiangmen railway station is the largest railway station in Jiangmen city

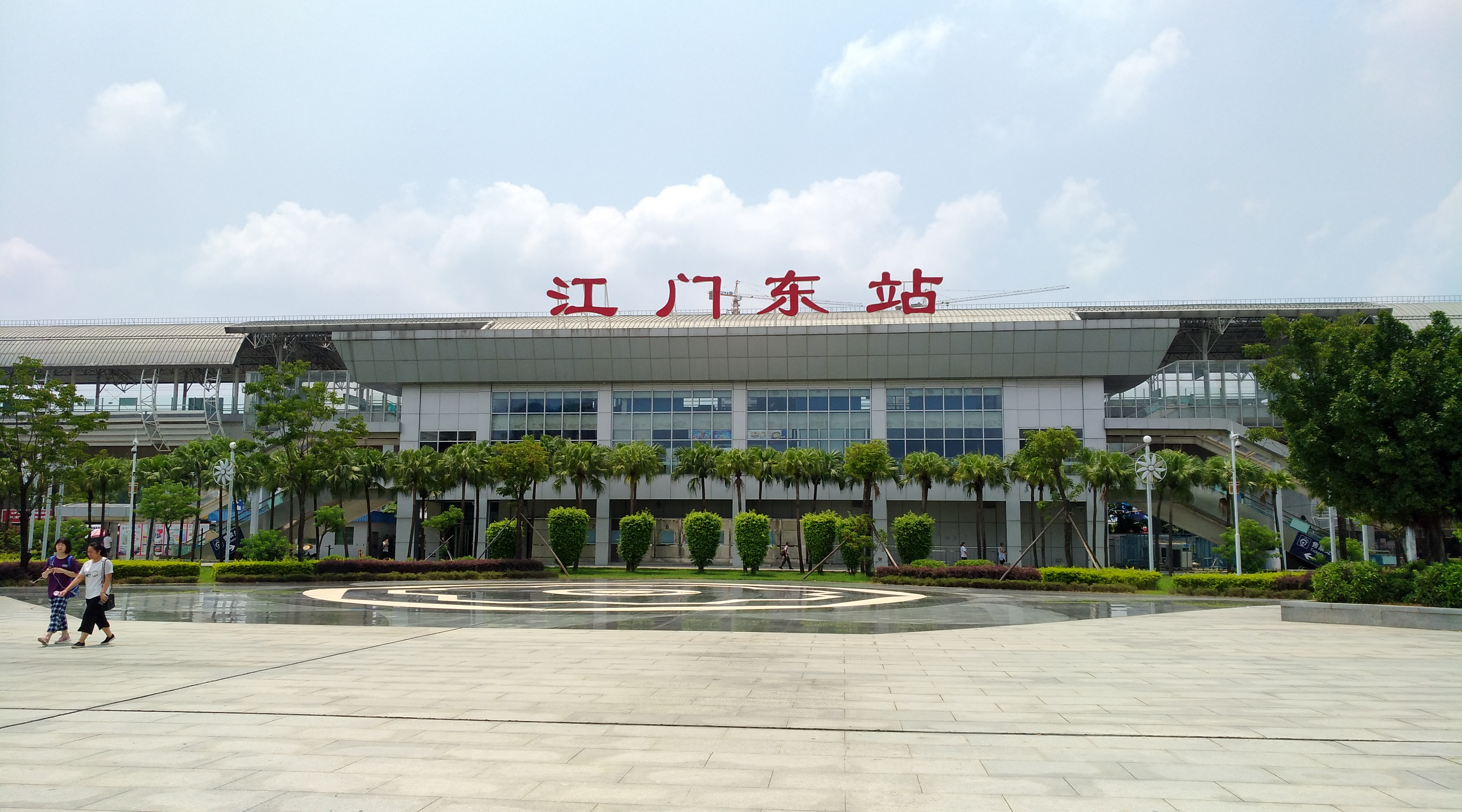
Jiangmen East railway station

Although the very first railway, Sun Ning Railway, began operation in 1909, it was discontinued in 1938 to deny its use by the Japanese military. The second operational railway is the Jiangmen branch of Guangzhou–Zhuhai intercity railway (opened 2011), which provides frequent service from Jiangmen railway station / Jiangmen East railway station to Guangzhou South Railway Station, where connections to the nation's high-speed railway network are available. Since the late 2012, Jiangmen is also served by the freight-only Guangzhou–Zhuhai Railway. Shenzhen–Zhanjiang high-speed railway, which opened in 2018, connects Jiangmen at Jiangmen railway station and Xinhui railway station, Shuangshuizhen railway station, Taishan, Kaiping South railway station and Enping railway station. Since then, Jiangmen is served by direct trains to Shanghai. Jiangmen railway station of the West Pearl River Delta Transportation Center, opened to the public on 16 November 2020. Jiangmen north railway station in the West Pearl River Delta International Logistics Center, Opened in 2021.

=== Ferries ===
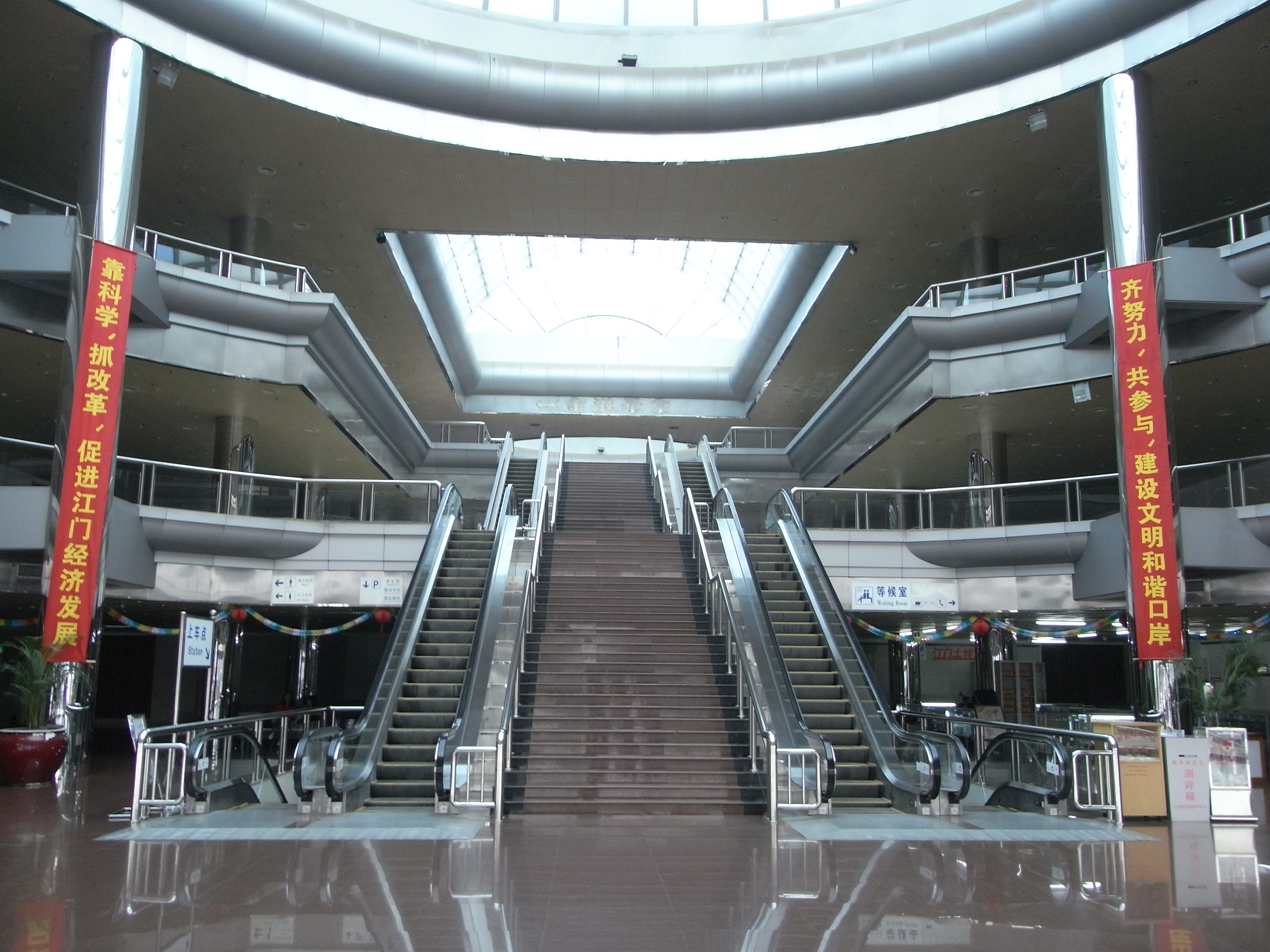
Inside view of Jiangmen Ferry Piers. Ferry services to Hong Kong and Macao are available here.

Making use of the Jiangmen Port facilities, Chu Kong Passenger Transport (CKS) connects Jiangmen with high speed ferry services to Hong Kong (95 nautical miles) taking about 2.5 hours each way. Shanzui Harbor connects Jiangmen taishan with ferry services to Shangchuan Island and Xiachuan Island taking about 30 min each way.

=== Coaches ===
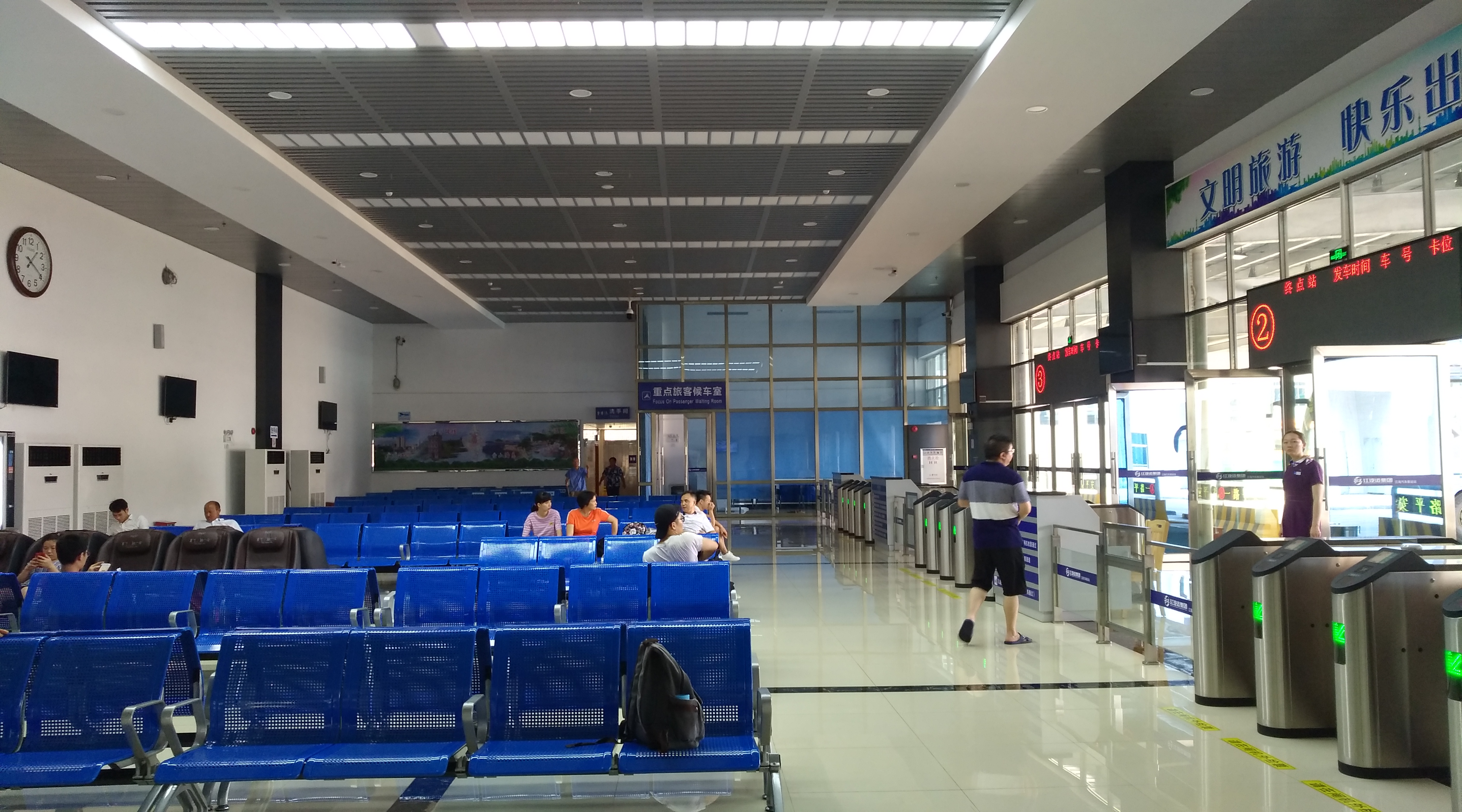
Waiting room of Jiangmen Jianghai Coach Terminal.

There are 18 coach terminals across Jiangmen as of 2016. 1,137 licensed coaches owned by 23 operators provide inter-county and inter-city bus services to major cities within and outside Guangdong.

=== Public transportation ===
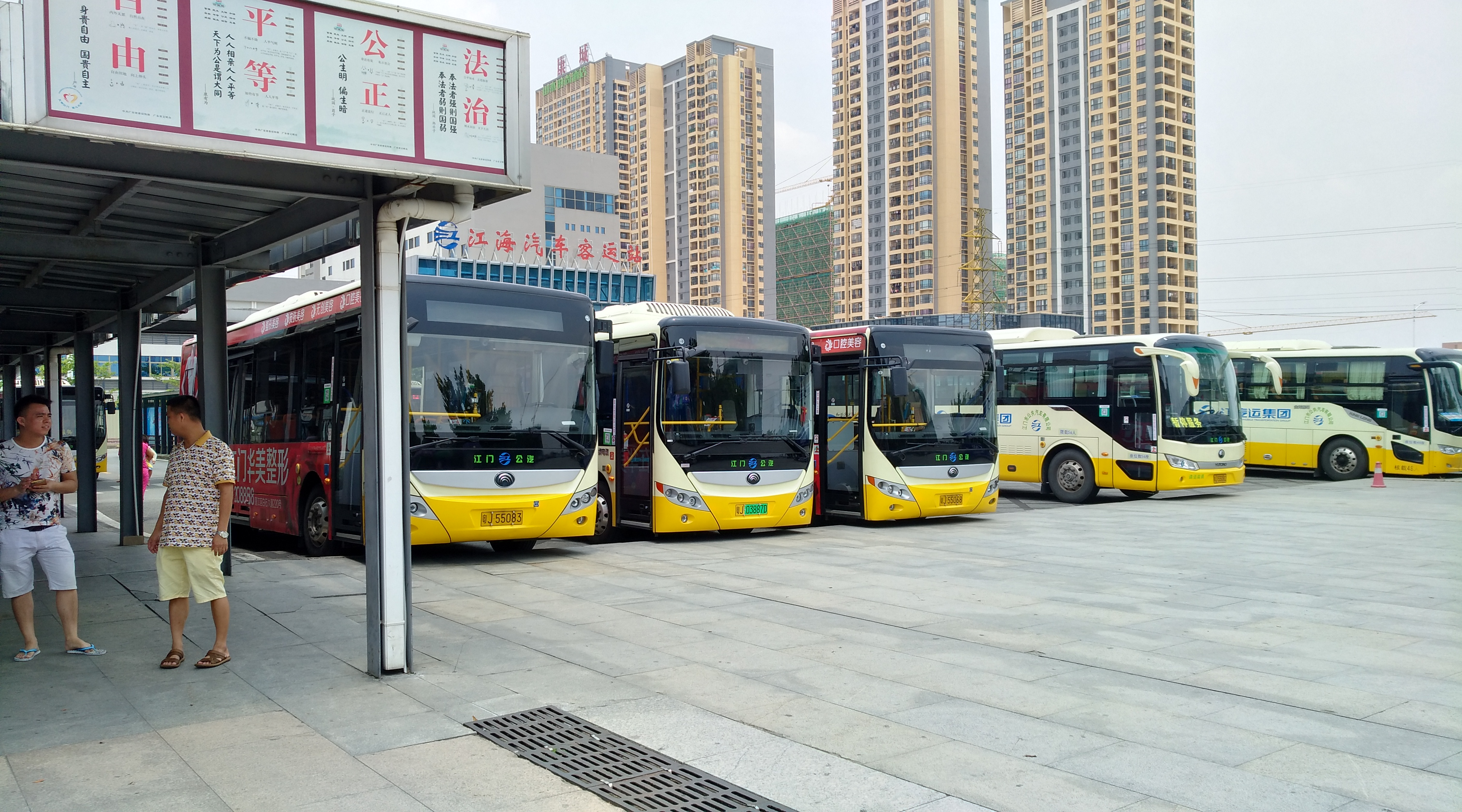
Buses outside Jiangmen East railway station.

Bus service within Pengjiang and Jianghai Districts are provided by Jiangmen Bus Co. Ltd.. Bus routes in Xinhui District were formerly operated by Macao-based Xinfuli Co., but all routes were consolidated into the city-owned bus system run by Jiangmen Automobile Transportation Group Co. Ltd. in 2010. Transit buses in other districts are operated by Jiangmen Automobile Transportation Group and other private companies.

By 2016, there are 1,077 taxicabs in Jiangmen, most of which are operated by local companies.

== Notable people ==
Sorted by family name/surname (as per the English spelling), then by English given name (if applicable) or by Chinese given name (if no English given name is available).

- Chin Siu Dek, Grandmaster of Kung Fu San Soo
- Victoria Chung (1897–1966) also known as Zhang Xiaobai, Canadian physician at Jiangmen Central Hospital
- Li Enliang (1912–2008), Chinese civil engineer and educator
- Inky Mark (born 1947), Canadian politician, mayor of Dauphin (1994–1997) and Member of Parliament (1997–2004)
- James Wong Howe (1899–1976), American cinematographer
- Tony Wong Chun-loong a.k.a. Wong Yuk-long, Hong Kong comic artist, moved to Hong Kong from Jiangmen at age 6
- Tyrus Wong (1910–2016), American painter, muralist, ceramicist, lithographer, designer and kite maker
- Leland Yee (born 1948), California State Senator and accused arms dealer

== See also ==
- List of prefecture-level divisions of China
