= No. 3 Middle School =

No. 3 Middle School or No. 3 High School may refer to any of these secondary schools:

== China ==
- Fuzhou No.3 Middle School, in Fuzhou, Fujian
- Zhuhai No.3 High School, in Zhuhai, Guangdong
- Nanning No.3 High School, in Nanning, Guangxi
- Harbin No 3 High School, in Harbin, Heilongjiang
- Nanjing No. 3 High School, in Nanjing, Jiangsu
- Tieling No.3 Middle School, in Tieling, Liaoning
- Shandong Province Zaozhuang No. 3 High School, in Zaozhuang, Shandong
- Tianjin No. 3 High School, in Tianjin

== Iran ==
- Allameh Helli No.3 High School, in Tehran
- Hadaf No.3 High School, in Tehran

== See also ==
- No. 1 Middle School (disambiguation)
- No. 2 Middle School (disambiguation)
