= Zhuhai Taoyuan Middle School =

Zhuhai Taoyuan Middle School 珠海市桃园中学 Zhūhǎi Shì Táoyuán Zhōngxúe

Location
- No.1, Taoyuan Rd, Xiangzhou, Zhuhai

Information
- Type: Public middle school
- Motto: People oriented, educate people first, Focus on features. 以人为本 育人为先 注重特色
- Established: 1983 (as junior department of Zhuhai No.3 Middle School); 2008 (as Zhuhai Taoyuan Middle School)
- School district: Xiangzhou, Zhuhai, Guangdong, China
- Grades: Grade 7 to Grade 9
- Enrollment: About 2000
- Campus area: 40238 square metres
- Fate: Merged into Zhuhai Zijing Middle School

Zhuhai Taoyuan Middle School (Chinese: 珠海市桃园中学; pinyin: Zhūhai Shì Táoyuán Zhōngxúe; colloquially known as 桃园中学, Táoyuán Zhōngxúe) is located in Xiangzhou, Zhuhai, Guangdong. It was a first-class middle school in Zhuhai and one of the Provincial Model Junior High Schools.

== History ==
Taoyuan Middle School was founded in 1983 as the junior high department of Zhuhai No.3 High School, on No.1 Taoyuan Rd, Xiangzhou.

In March 2008, the school got its independence and changed its name to "Zhuhai Taoyuan Middle School".

In 2011, the school was merged into Zhuhai Zijing Middle School as Taoyuan Rd Campus. Some students felt regret for the disappearance of the name of their school, while students' parents concerned if the two schools could achieve complete integration.

== Campus facilities ==
- A stadium with a 400-metre track, a standard football field. The stadium is used for the only test site of the PE Senior High School Entrance Examination in Xiangzhou.
- Teaching Buildings
