= Zhuhai No.1 High School =

Public high school in Guangdong, China

Zhuhai No.1 High School 珠海市第一中学 Zhūhai Shì Dìyī Zhōngxué

Location
- No.2180, Meihua Xi Rd, Xiangzhou, Zhuhai

Information
- Type: Public high school
- Motto: Enjoy learning, seek truth, excel at communication, bold in blazing new trails. 乐学，求真，从善，创美。
- Established: 1960
- School district: Xiangzhou, Zhuhai, Guangdong, China
- President: Zhang Liu'an
- Faculty: About 300
- Grades: Grade 10 (or 1) to Grade 12 (or 3)
- Enrollment: About 3900
- Campus size: 123,619.85 m^{2} (1,330,633.0 sq ft)
- Colors: Red, white and black
- Spirits: Using esthetical education to develop new generation 用美的教育造就美的新人
- Website: zhdyzx.cn

Chinese name
- Traditional Chinese: 珠海市第一中學
- Simplified Chinese: 珠海市第一中学
Transcriptions
Standard Mandarin
- Hanyu Pinyin: Zhūhai Shì Dìyī Zhōngxué
Yue: Cantonese
- Jyutping: Zyu^{1}-hoi^{2}-si^{5} Dai^{6}-jat^{1} Zung^{1}-hok^{6}

Zhuhai No.1 High School (ZH1Z; (Chinese: 珠海市第一中学; pinyin: Zhūhai Shì Dìyī Zhōngxué); colloquially known as 珠海一中, Zhūhǎi Yīzhōng) is located in Xiangzhou, Zhuhai, Guangdong. It is one of the National Model Senior High Schools of Guangdong Province.

== History ==
Zhuhai No.1 High School was founded in 1960 as Xiangzhou Fishermen Middle School (香洲渔民中学; pinyin: Xiāngzhōu Yúmín Zhōngxúe). In 1962, it changed its name to Xiangzhou Middle School (香洲中学; pinyin: Xiāngzhōu Zhōngxúe) and current name in July 1981. In 1979, it set up the senior high department. The current campus was being put into use for the expanding of senior high department in 2000.

In 2008, the junior high department changed its name to Zhuhai Zijing Middle School (珠海市紫荆中学; pinyin: Zhūhǎi Shì Zǐjīng Zhōngxúe). In 2013, No.1 Middle School of Pingsha Zhuhai (珠海市平沙第一中学; pinyin: Zhūhǎi Shì Píngshā Dìyī Zhōngxúe) was merged into as "Pingsha Campus". In 2014, the Experimental School Affiliated with Zhuhai No.1 High School (珠海一中附属实验学校) was founded.

== Campus facilities ==
- Cafeteria 1 (Kang Denong, 康德农)
- Cafeteria 2 (Wan Hao, 万豪)
- Campus small supermarket
- Campus "big" supermarket
- Milktea shop
- Fruit store
- Library, including a study room, an Internet room
- Gymnasium: including two indoor basketball courts, four table tennis tables, and a stage for physical education, major sporting events, and large gatherings with large-scale theatrical performances
- Comprehensive student activity center
- Swimming pool: ceased to function
- Student dormitory: Buildings 1-3 are boys only, 4-6 are girls only.

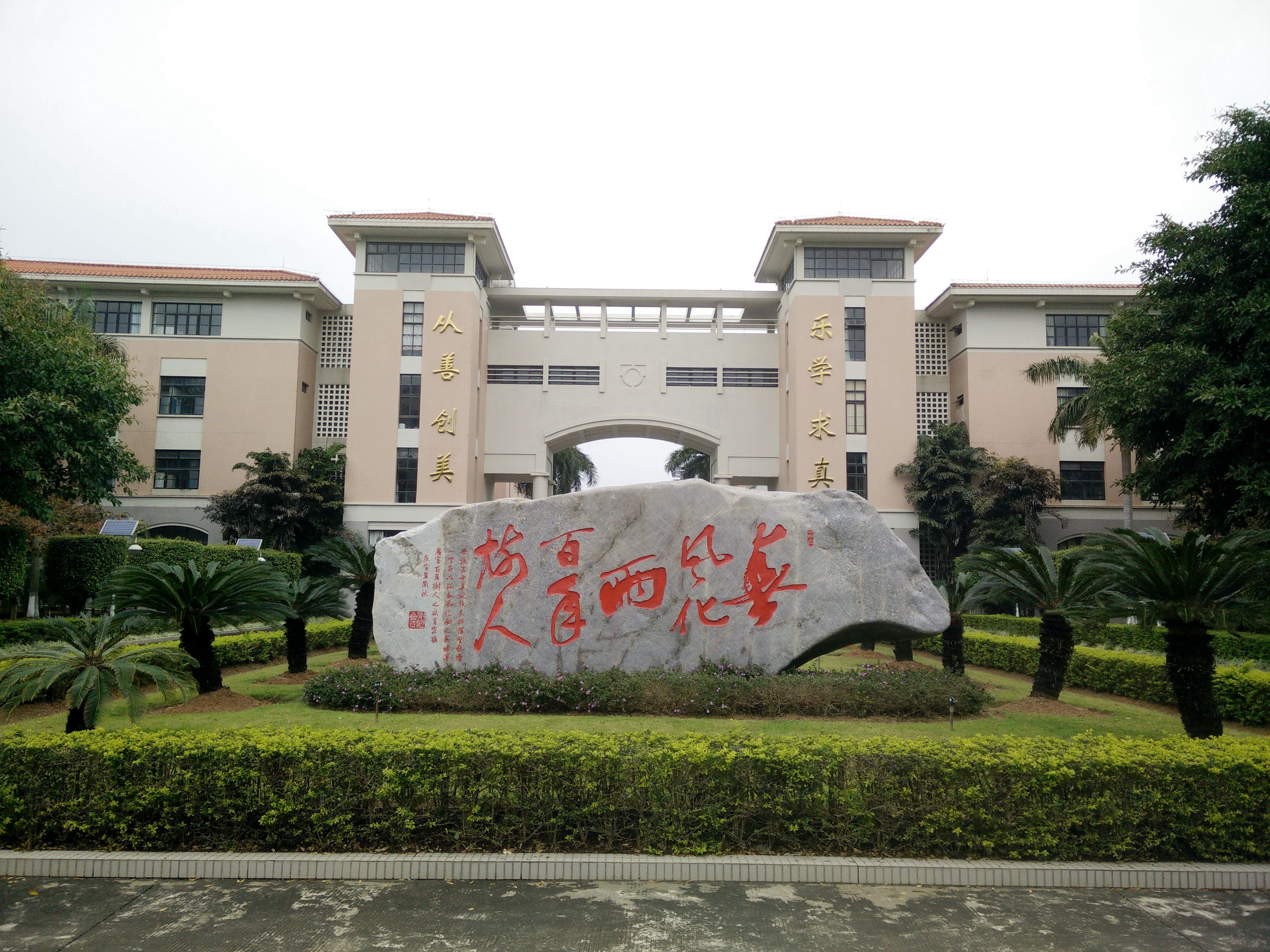
The Spring Wind Stone

- Administration Building
- Staff dormitories
- Clock tower: with an astronomical telescope given by Purple Mountain Observatory inside
- Information Centre
- Stadium: 400 m track, a standard football field, basketball courts, volleyball courts.
- Teaching Building: four buildings together for Grade 1 and Grade 2, one separate building for Grade 3.
- Laboratory building: the north and south wings have physical, chemical, biological laboratories.
- Gengdu Garden (耕读园)

=== Grade Unions ===
The Grade Unions are led by the Grade Youth League Committee. They're usually responsible for students' daily lives.

- Learning Department: responsible for assisting in the management of the school library.
- Sanitation Department: responsible for inspecting class sanitation.
- Livelihood Department: responsible for inspecting class discipline of eye exercises, supplying students daily milk, and supervising the supermarkets and diet centres.
- Dormitory Administration Department: responsible for inspecting dormitory discipline.
- Propaganda Department: responsible for giving speeches on Mondays morning.
- Discipline Inspection Department: responsible for inspecting class discipline.

=== School Union ===
The School Union is led by the School Youth League Committee. It's responsible for important events.

- School Secretariat: Manage League affairs, and be responsible for the logistics of the Students Union.
- Organization Department: responsible for dealing with complaints to Grade Unions.
- Sports Department: responsible for organizing student sporting events.
- Club Department: responsible for all clubs.
- Entertainment Department: Manage cultural and sports events.
- Information Department: the former school TV station, responsible for videotaping large-scale theatrical performances and sports events and broadcasting the midday news.

== Incidents ==
- On 22 September 2010, a Grade 11 student committed suicide at home due to the heavy homework.
- On 28 December 2013, 78 students had diarrhea after meals in the Diet Centre from suspected food poisoning; some were sent to the hospital. It was reported on January 1, 2014, that it was caused by Norovirus infection. All of the sick students recovered.
- On March 9, 2017, a student fell from the seat suddenly and lost consciousness when eating lunch in Diet Centre 1, suspected food poisoning.
- On 23–24 August 2017, Typhoon Hato destroyed the school campus severely, forcing Grade 12 to suspend their class for a week. The schedule of the term-starting ceremony also had to be postponed.
- At the end of 2018 and at the beginning of 2019, a chicken pox epidemic broke out, affecting couples of students in Grade 10 and 11, with 1 or 2 student in Grade 12 being infected, which resulted in his or her absence from the key point of preparing for Gaokao.

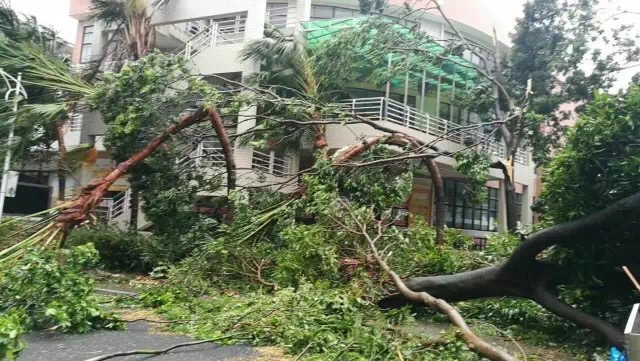
The campus was destroyed by Hato.

== Human rights ==
The school forces students to take part in the "Paocao" (literally "Running Gymnastics") and forces some classes to run much more laps as a physical punishment. The school authority claims to improve students' constitutions in this way, but the real effect still remains unknown. It can be a special precaution to develop collectivism. It also occupies many legal holidays without reasons.
