= 2027 Porsche Carrera Cup Asia =

Motorsport racing season

The 2027 Porsche Carrera Cup Asia will be the twenty-fourth season of the Porsche Carrera Cup Asia. The season will commence on 27 March at the Zhuhai International Circuit, and will finish at Marina Bay Street Circuit on 10 October.

== Calendar ==
Round		Circuit	Date	Supporting	Location
	Prologue	(China) Zhuhai International Circuit, Xiangzhou District, Zhuhai	24–25 March	—N/a	2027 Porsche Carrera Cup Asia is located in Asia
1	R1	(China) Zhuhai International Circuit, Xiangzhou District, Zhuhai	27–28 March	Stand-alone race	2027 Porsche Carrera Cup Asia is located in Asia
1	R2	(China) Zhuhai International Circuit, Xiangzhou District, Zhuhai	27–28 March	Stand-alone race	2027 Porsche Carrera Cup Asia is located in Asia
2	R3	(China) Shanghai International Circuit, Jiading District	16–18 April	Formula One World Championship	2027 Porsche Carrera Cup Asia is located in Asia
2	R4	(China) Shanghai International Circuit, Jiading District	16–18 April	Formula One World Championship	2027 Porsche Carrera Cup Asia is located in Asia
3	R5	(Japan) Fuji Speedway, Oyama, Shizuoka Prefecture	21–23 May	Porsche Carrera Cup Japan	2027 Porsche Carrera Cup Asia is located in Asia
3	R6	(Japan) Fuji Speedway, Oyama, Shizuoka Prefecture	21–23 May	Porsche Carrera Cup Japan	2027 Porsche Carrera Cup Asia is located in Asia
3	R7	(Japan) Fuji Speedway, Oyama, Shizuoka Prefecture	21–23 May	Porsche Carrera Cup Japan	2027 Porsche Carrera Cup Asia is located in Asia
4	R8	(Malaysia) Sepang International Circuit, Sepang	20–22 August	TBA	2027 Porsche Carrera Cup Asia is located in Asia
4	R9	(Malaysia) Sepang International Circuit, Sepang	20–22 August	TBA	2027 Porsche Carrera Cup Asia is located in Asia
4	R10	(Malaysia) Sepang International Circuit, Sepang	20–22 August	TBA	2027 Porsche Carrera Cup Asia is located in Asia
5	R11	(Malaysia) Sepang International Circuit, Sepang	17–19 September	TBA	2027 Porsche Carrera Cup Asia is located in Asia
5	R12	(Malaysia) Sepang International Circuit, Sepang	17–19 September	TBA	2027 Porsche Carrera Cup Asia is located in Asia
5	R13	(Malaysia) Sepang International Circuit, Sepang	17–19 September	TBA	2027 Porsche Carrera Cup Asia is located in Asia
6	R14	Marina Bay Street Circuit, Singapore	8–10 October	Formula One World Championship	2027 Porsche Carrera Cup Asia is located in Asia
6	R15	Marina Bay Street Circuit, Singapore	8–10 October	Formula One World Championship	2027 Porsche Carrera Cup Asia is located in Asia
