= Banzhang Mountain =

Hill in Zhuhai, China

Coordinates: 22.2308°N 113.5358°E

Banzhang Mountain is a mountain that rises up 300 metres (980 ft) above sea level. The geographical feature separates Ningxi of New Xiangzhou from Gongbei, both inside the city of Zhuhai, China.
