= Qianshan railway station =

Railway station in Guangdong, China

Qianshan 前山
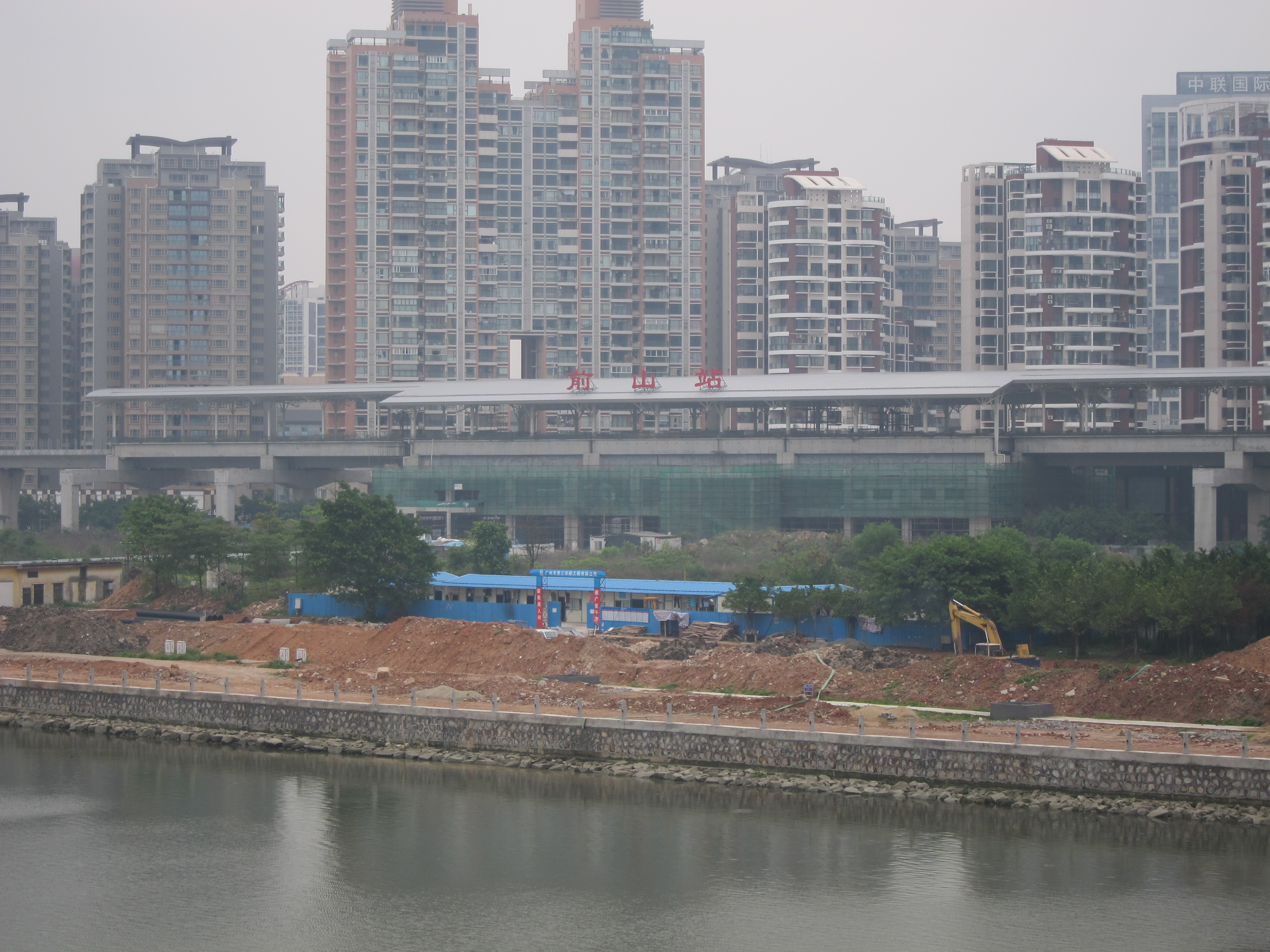

General information
- Location: Gangchang Rd, Qianshan, Xiangzhou District, Zhuhai, Guangdong; China
- Coordinates: 22°14′15″N 113°31′14″E
- Owned by: Guangdong Guangzhu Intercity Rail Transit
- Operated by: CR Guangzhou
- Line(s): Guangzhou–Zhuhai intercity railway
- Platforms: 2 (side platforms)
- Connections: Bus routes 46, K2

Construction
- Structure type: Elevated

Other information
- Station code: QXQ

History
- Opened: 31 December 2012

Services
Preceding station	Pearl River Delta Metropolitan Region Intercity Railway	Following station
Mingzhu towards Guangzhou South	Guangzhou–Zhuhai intercity railway	Zhuhai Terminus
Location

Qianshan railway station (Chinese: 前山站; pinyin: Qiánshān Zhàn) is an elevated station on the Guangzhou–Zhuhai intercity railway. It is located in Qianshan, Xiangzhou District, Zhuhai, Guangdong Province, China.

The station entered service when all remaining stations in the Zhuhai section of the Guangzhu ICR opened on 31 December 2012. Service was suspended during 19 February 2020 and 15 February 2023 due to COVID-19 pandemic.
