= Mingzhu railway station =

Railway station in Zhuhai, China

Mingzhu 明珠
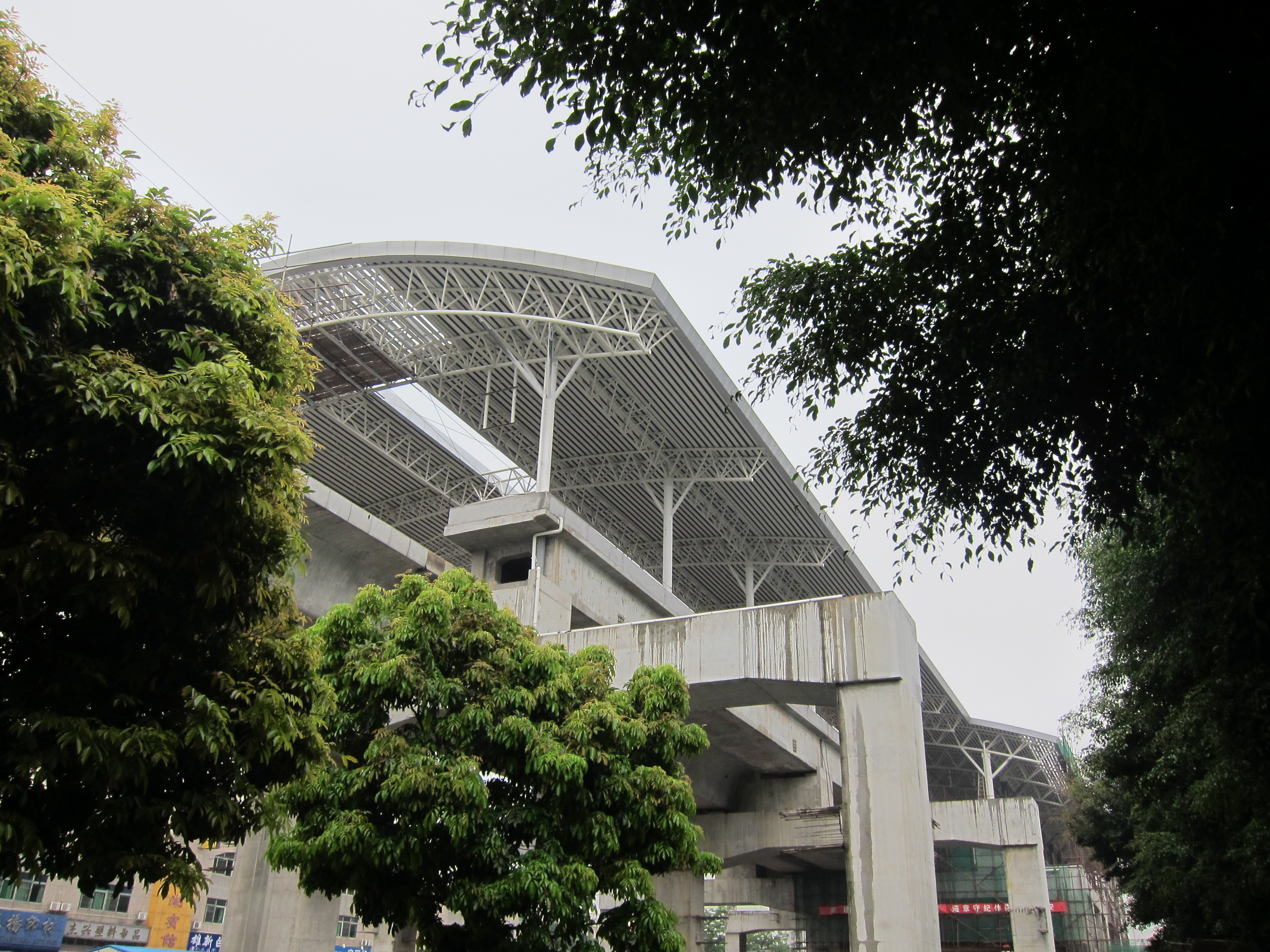

General information
- Location: Mingzhu Beilu, Xiangzhou District, Zhuhai, Guangdong; China
- Coordinates: 22°16′17″N 113°30′37″E
- Owned by: Guangdong Guangzhu Intercity Rail Transit
- Operated by: CR Guangzhou
- Line: Guangzhou–Zhuhai intercity railway
- Platforms: 2 (side platforms)
- Connections: Bus routes 6, 16, 31, 36, 40, 41, 42, 55

Construction
- Structure type: Elevated

Other information
- Station code: MFQ

History
- Opened: 31 December 2012; 12 years ago

Services
| Preceding station | Pearl River Delta Metropolitan Region Intercity Railway | Following station |
|---|---|---|
| Tangjiawan towards Guangzhou South | Guangzhou–Zhuhai intercity railway | Qianshan towards Zhuhai |
Location

Mingzhu railway station (Chinese: 明珠站; pinyin: Míngzhū Zhàn) is an elevated station of the Guangzhou–Zhuhai intercity railway (Guangzhu ICR). It is located in New Xiangzhou, Xiangzhou, Zhuhai, Guangdong, China.

The station is currently entered service along with the other stations in the Zhuhai section of the Guangzhu ICR when that section opened in 2012.
