= Gongbei =

Gongbei (Chinese: 拱北) may refer to:

- Gongbei Port of Entry in Zhuhai, Guangdong, on the Mainland China's border with Macau
- Gongbei Subdistrict, an administrative subdistrict (jiedao) in Zhuhai City, Guangdong
- Gongbei (Islamic architecture), grave of a Sufi master in Northwestern China
