= Tangjiawan railway station =

Guangzhou ICR railway station in China

Tangjiawan 唐家湾
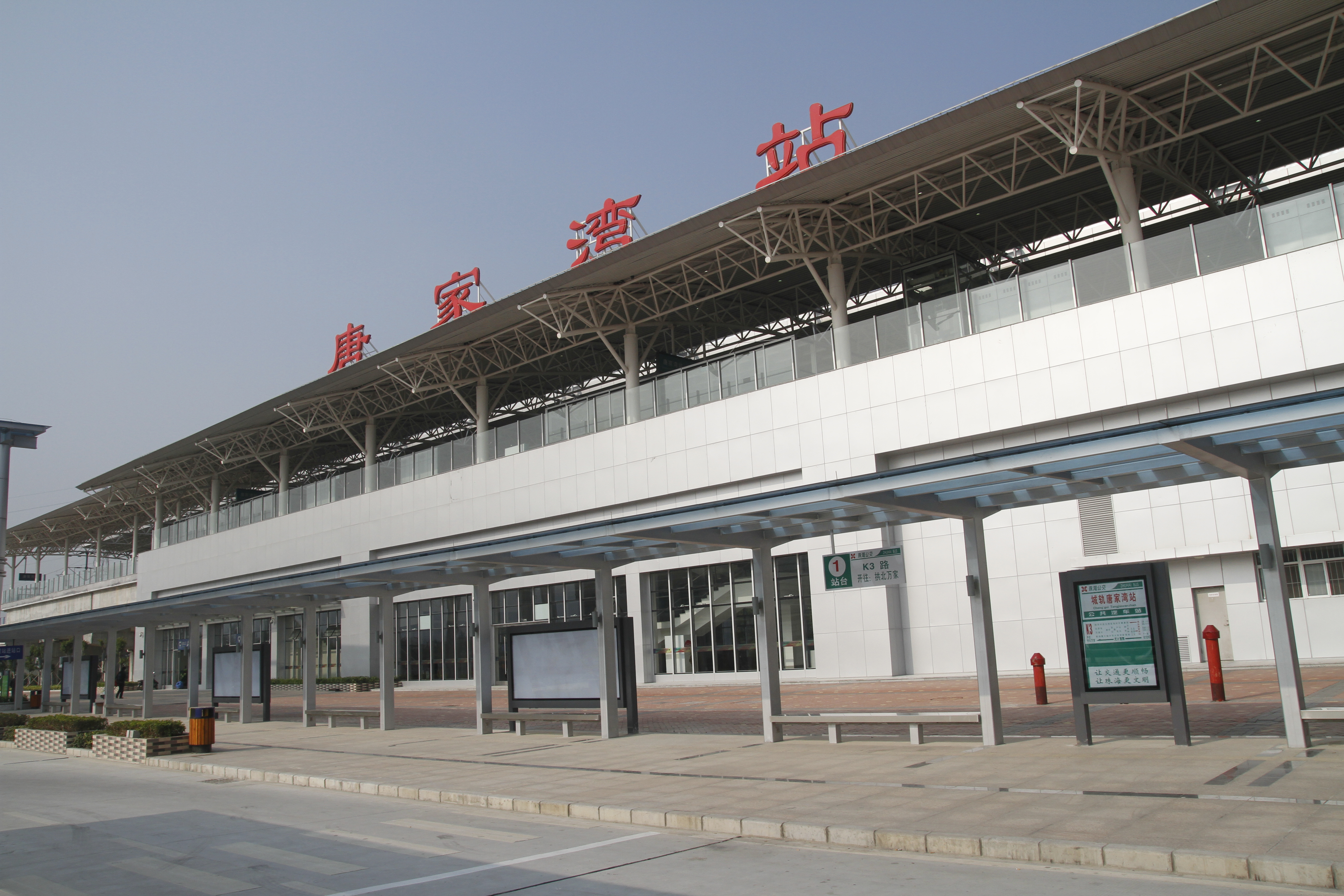

General information
- Location: Jinfeng Lu, Xiangzhou District, Zhuhai, Guangdong; China
- Coordinates: 22°21′42.76″N 113°33′2.00″E
- Owned by: Guangdong Guangzhu Intercity Rail Transit
- Operated by: CR Guangzhou
- Line: Guangzhou–Zhuhai intercity railway
- Platforms: 2 (side platforms)
- Connections: Bus routes 10A, 69, 70, K3

Construction
- Structure type: Elevated

Other information
- Station code: PDQ

History
- Opened: December 31, 2012

Services
Preceding station	Pearl River Delta Metropolitan Region Intercity Railway	Following station
Zhuhai North towards Guangzhou South	Guangzhou–Zhuhai intercity railway	Mingzhu towards Zhuhai
Location

Tangjiawan railway station (Chinese: 唐家湾站; pinyin: Tángjiāwān Zhàn), formerly Jintang railway station (Chinese: 金唐站) during planning, is an elevated station of the Guangzhou–Zhuhai intercity railway (Guangzhu ICR). It is located in Tangjia Town, Xiangzhou, Zhuhai, Guangdong, China, and is located directly in front of the Zhuhai College of the Beijing Institute of Technology and near the Zhuhai International Circuit.

The station entered service when all remaining stations in the Zhuhai section of the Guangzhu MRT opened on December 31, 2012.

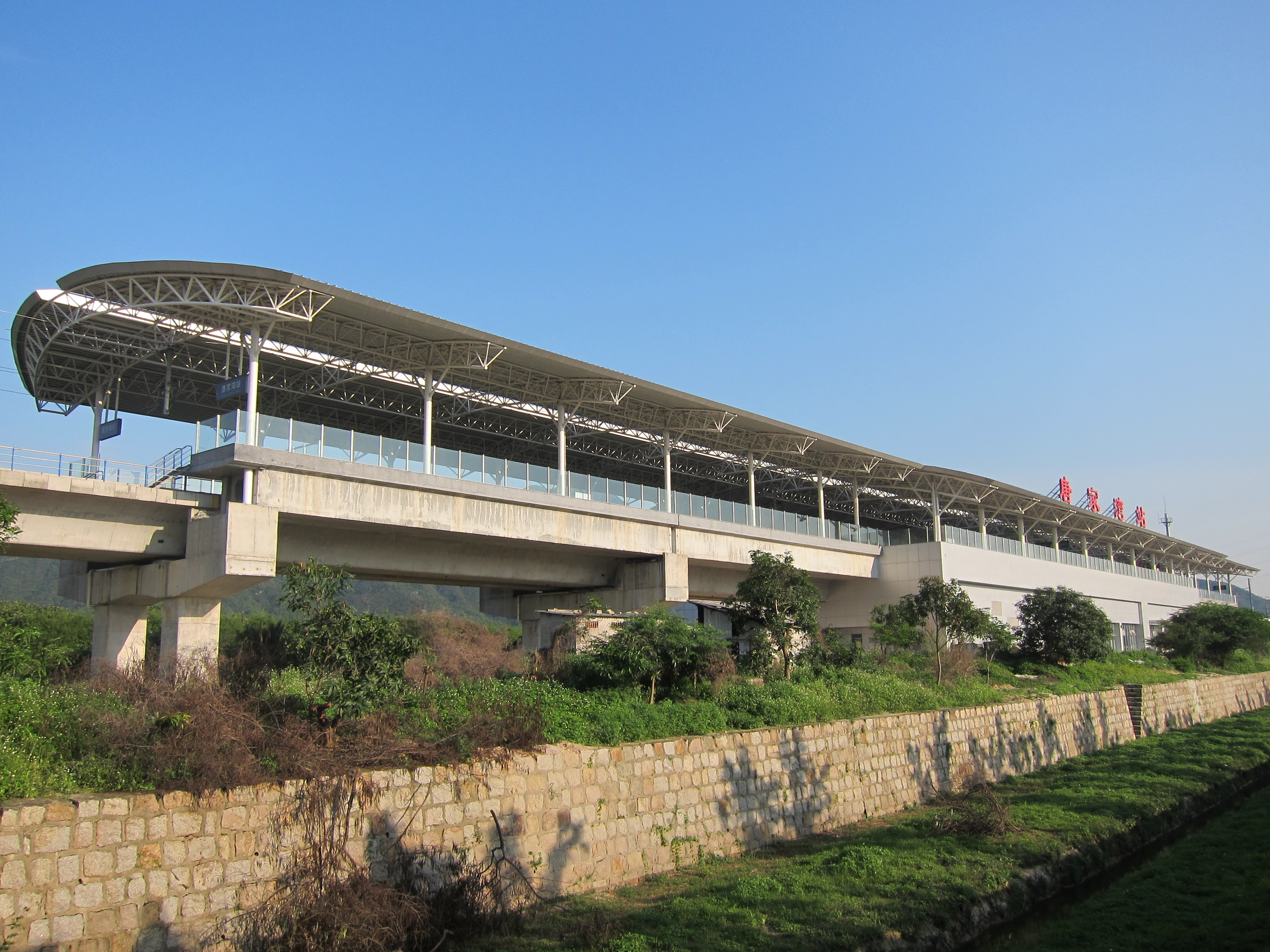

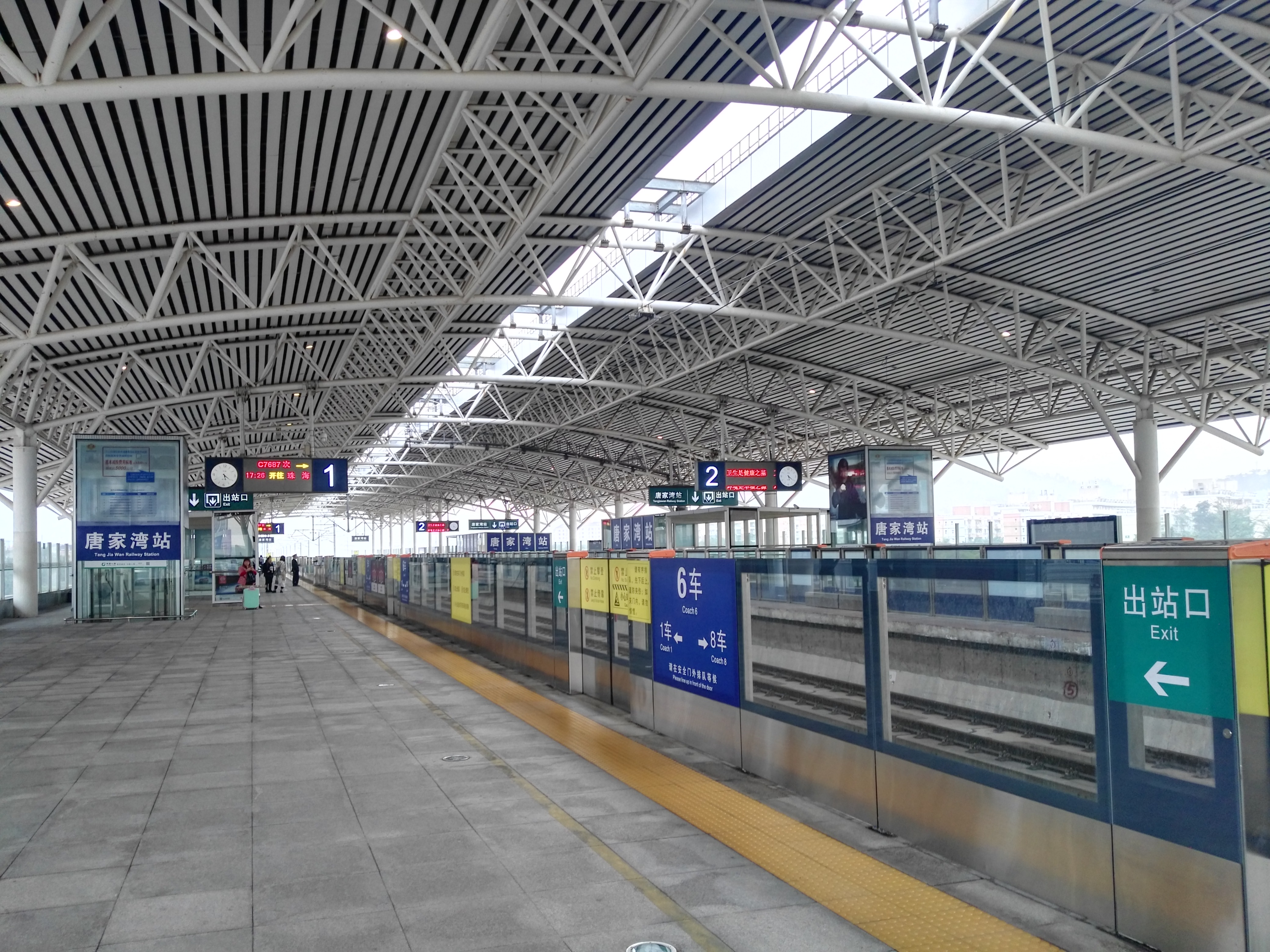

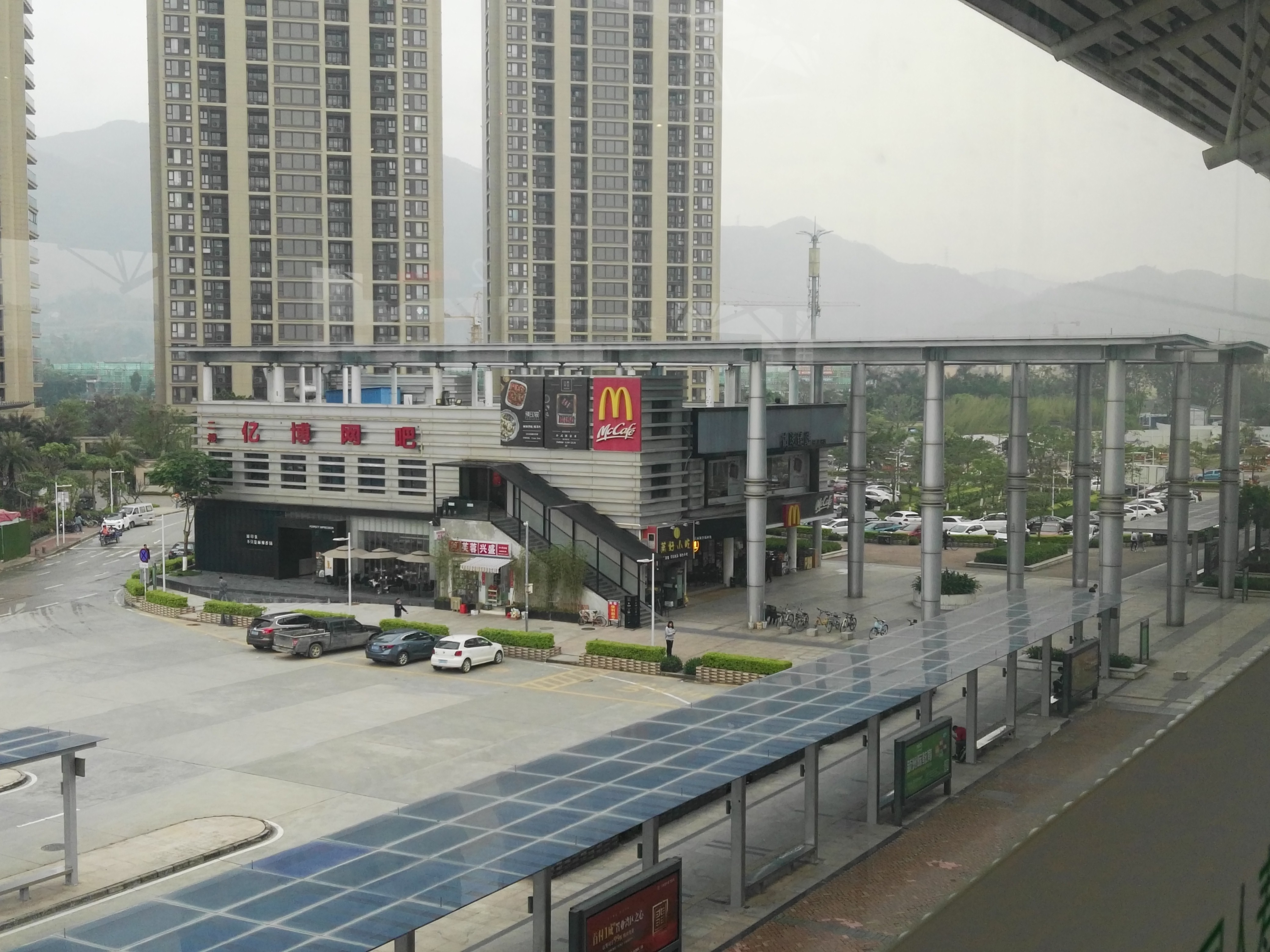
