= Liuzhou Senior High School =

- 柳州高级中学

Location
- Liuzhou, Guangxi, China; Gaoxin Campus: No.26, Gaoxin 5th Road, Chengzhong District; Liunan Campus: No.139, Heping Road, Liunan District

Information
- Type: Public
- Motto: 全面发展 勤奋学习 严格要求 实事求是 (Developing comprehensively, Studying diligently, Self-Discipline strictly, seeking truth from facts)
- Established: 1907
- Principal: Shuying Liang
- Faculty: 541
- Enrollment: ~7000
- Website: http://www.lzgz.net.cn

Liuzhou Senior High School, is a high school located in Liuzhou, Guangxi, China. It was called "Liuzhou Government Middle School (柳州府官立中学堂)" when established in 1907 (33rd. Year of Guangxu, Qing). During Republic of China, It had changed its name from Liuzhou Middle School (柳州中学校), Eight-Counties-Established Middle School, Liuzhou (柳州八县合立中学), Provincial Fourth Middle School (省立第四中学校), Provincial Fourth Junior High School (省立第四初级中学) and Liuzhou Middle School (柳州中学). After People's Republic of China established, It changed its name into Liuzhou Senior High School (柳州高级中学).

Liuzhou Senior High School now has 2 campuses: Gaoxin Campus (after November 25, 2015) and Liunan Campus (after September, 2016).

== School History ==
=== Before 1949 ===
- March, 1907: Liuzhou Government Middle School was established.
- 1912: Changed its name into "Liuzhou Middle School".
- 1917: Because of the shortage of funds, school was held by the eight counties belonging Liuzhou and changed its name into "Eight-Counties-Established Middle School, Liuzhou".
- 1919-1933: Held by Guangxi Province Government, changed its name into "Provincial Fourth Middle School".
- 1933: Provincial Fourth Girls' High School was closed and merged with Provincial Fourth Middle School and named the new school "Provincial Fourth Junior High School".
- 1934: Maping County Junior High School was closed and merged into Provincial Fourth Junior High School.
- 1940: Changed its name into "Liuzhou Middle School".

=== After 1949 ===
- 1950: Liuzhou Middle School merged with Liuqing Teacher School, called "Liuzhou Senior High School".
- 1952: Liuzhou Senior High School merged with Longcheng Middle School and Xinhua Middle School, called "Liuzhou Middle School".
- Autumn, 1956: Changed its name into "Liuzhou Senior High School".
- September, 1960: Wantang Road Primary School and First Junior High School were merged with Liuzhou Senior High School, called "Liuzhou Middle School".
- 1963: Rename to "Liuzhou Senior High School".
- 1966-1968: Stopped courses because of Culture Revolution.
- November 25, 2015: School moved to new campus and left the old to Longcheng Middle School.
- September, 2016: Liunan Campus opened.

== School Conditions ==
=== Scale ===
As of June 2010, the campus of Liuzhou Senior High School covers an area of 272,000 square meters with a building area of 100,000 square meters, with 4,077 students and 275 teaching staff.

=== Facilities ===
As of December 2013, Liuzhou Senior High School had are 100 classrooms, with students reading room, library, multimedia classrooms, language lab, computer network classroom and function room have broadband gigabit campus network, has a large lecture hall, 1200 standard indoor gymnasium and swimming pool, a standard football field.

By November 2008, the library of Liuzhou Senior High School was put into use on five floors with a total area of 3,000 square meters and a total collection of over 150,000 volumes. There are a total of 423.6 square meters in the reading room and magazine vault. There are 160 reading seats, over 300 periodicals, over 70 newspapers and over 20,000 volumes of periodicals. The electronic reading room covers 166 square meters and contains 93 computers.

=== Faculty ===
School now has 541 teachers, 2 of them have Doctor's degree, 187 of them have Master's degree.

== See also ==
- Nanning No.2 High School
- Nanning No.3 High School
