= Zhuhai Xiang Zhang Secondary School =

Private Chinese girls' school

- Simplified Chinese: 珠海市香樟中学
- Traditional Chinese: 珠海市香樟中學
Transcriptions
Standard Mandarin
- Hanyu Pinyin: Zhūhǎi Shì Xiāng Zhāng Zhōngxué
Yue: Cantonese
- Jyutping: zyu1 hoi2 si5 hoeng1 zoeng1 zung1 hok6

Zhuhai Girls' Middle School
- Simplified Chinese: 珠海女子中学
- Traditional Chinese: 珠海女子中學
- Literal meaning: Zhuhai Girls' Secondary School
Transcriptions
Standard Mandarin
- Hanyu Pinyin: Zhūhǎi Nǚzǐ Zhōngxué
Yue: Cantonese
- Jyutping: zyu1 hoi2 neoi5 zi2 zung1 hok6

Zhuhai Xiang Zhang Secondary School, formerly Zhuhai Girls' Middle School (ZHGS, from Pinyin: ZHNZZX), is a secondary school for girls in Xiangzhou District, Zhuhai, Guangdong, China. It includes both junior high school and senior high school levels and has a dormitory. It is the only private girls' school in China as of 2011. It is also called Henglong Girls' Middle School.

== History ==
It opened in September 2011, making it the first girls' only school in Guangdong province in the modern era. It began enrolling students the previous March, and half of its slots filled after 10 days despite what the Beijing Review characterized as high tuition fees. Zhuhai Henglong Group invested 100 million renminbi ($15 million U.S. dollars) into the school. The company is a real estate firm that operates other private schools.

At one time QSI International School of Zhuhai was on the Girls' Middle campus.

== Student body ==
As of 2011 70% of the students originated from the Pearl River Delta and most of the students were from well-to-do backgrounds.

== Operations ==
In 2011 the per-semester costs for junior high school, senior high school, and international high school levels were 26,600 RMB ($4,030 U.S.), 28,000-34,000 RMB ($4,242-$5,152 U.S.) and up to 61,000 RMB ($9,242 U.S.), respectively.

== Academics and activities ==
Courses include home economics, foreign languages (in which students may take two different ones at a time), exercise, and self-defense.

It offers nighttime yoga classes and morning exercise classes.

== Reception ==
In 2010 there was debate over the school, with some championing its female-oriented programming and others criticizing separating girls from boys.

== See also ==
- List of girls' schools
