= Nanning No.2 High School =

Coordinates: 22°58′38.92″N 108°18′18.61″E

Nannning No.2 High School
- 南宁二中
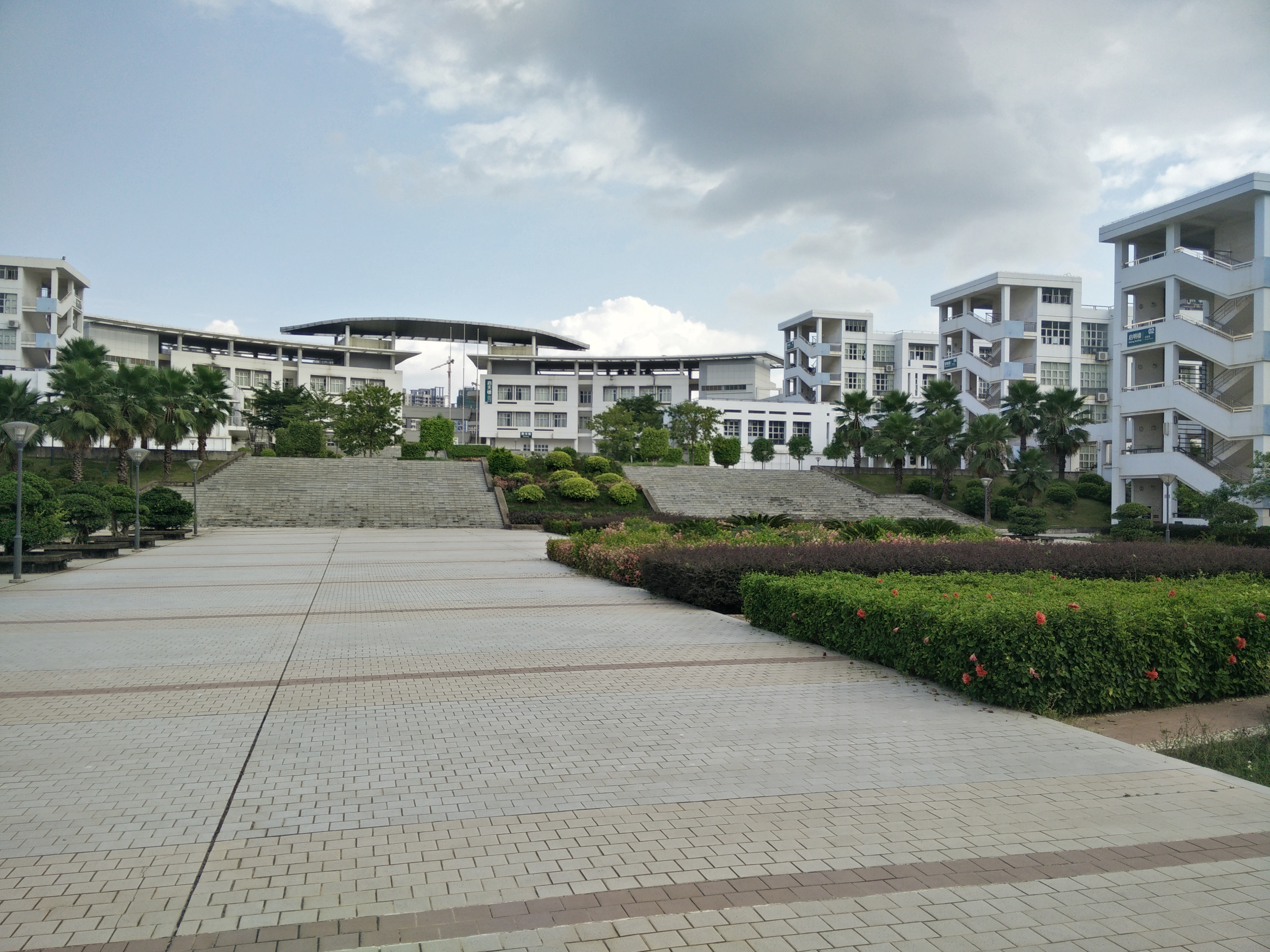
- Nanning No.2 High School is a senior high school in Nanning, Guangxi

Location
- Nanning, Guangxi, China; 29 Xinmin Road (Xinmin Campus); 66 Yunjing Road (Fengling Campus)

Information
- Type: Public
- Motto: 启牗智慧 活泼身心 (Inspire the wisdom and motivate the body and spirit.)
- Established: 1906
- Principal: Youyan Huang
- Faculty: 297
- Enrollment: 3905
- Website: http://www.nnez.com.cn/

Nanning No.2 High School (abbreviated NNEZ; Chinese: 南宁市第二中学)is a senior high school in Nanning, Guangxi, China. The school was ranked as one of the "Top 100 High Schools of China" in 2017.

With a long history and professional education resources, Nanning No.2 High School students progress to further education. Its alumni are spread around the world. For example, Lai Keji works as an associate professor at the University of Texas at Austin. The school is bringing professionals from universities in various fields to broaden students' visions through a school program, Yuan Zu Forum.

== See also ==
- Nanning No.3 High School
- Liuzhou Senior High School
