= Qianshan Subdistrict =

Coordinates: 22°15′01″N 113°31′24″E

Qianshan 前山街道
- Subdistrict
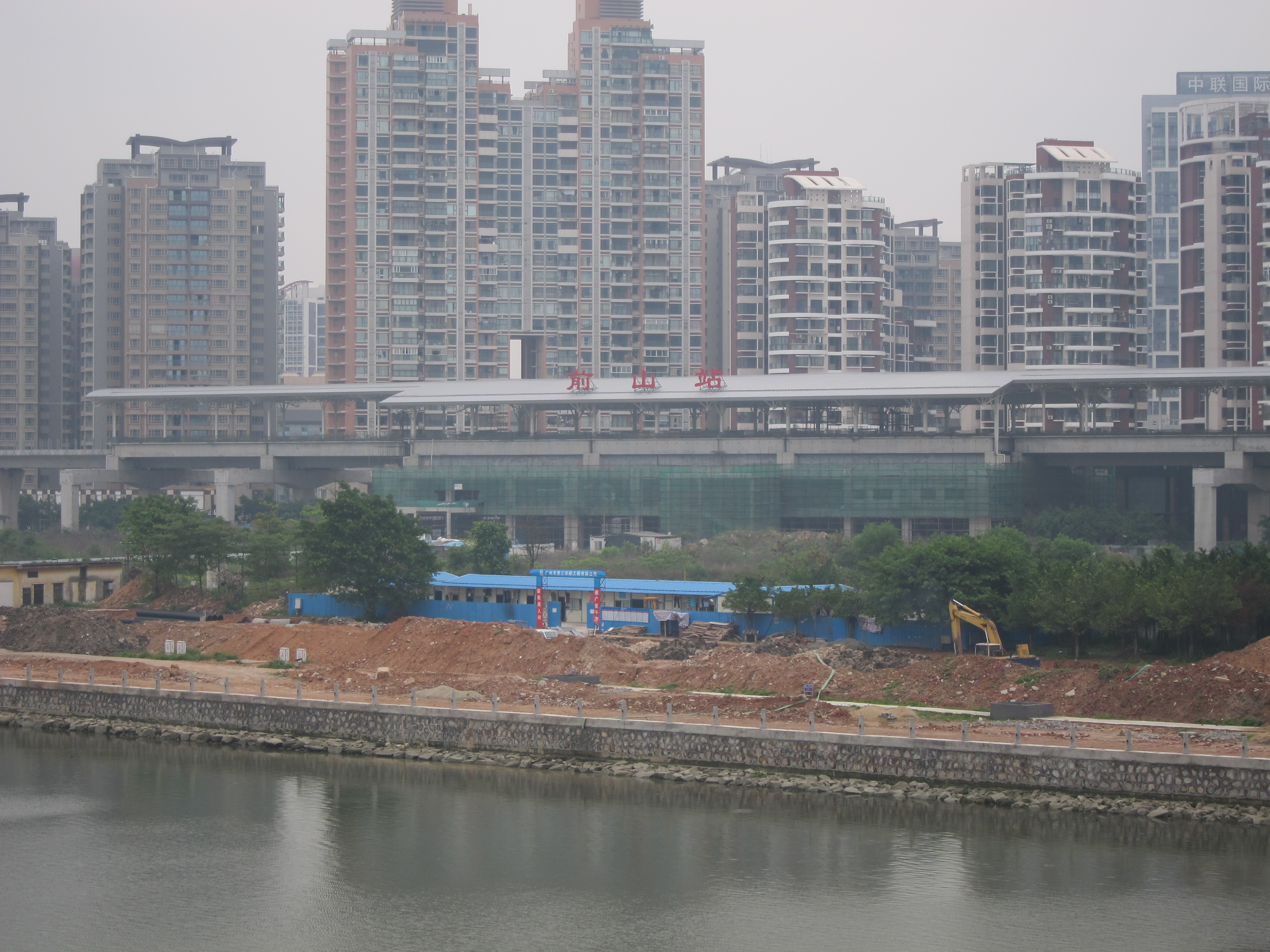
- Qianshan Station
- Interactive map of Qianshan
- Country: China
- Province: Guangdong
- Prefecture: Zhuhai
- District: Xiangzhou

Area
  - Total: 53.00 km^{2} (20.46 sq mi)

Population (2010)
  - Total: 184,738
- Time zone: UTC+8 (China Standard Time)

Qianshan
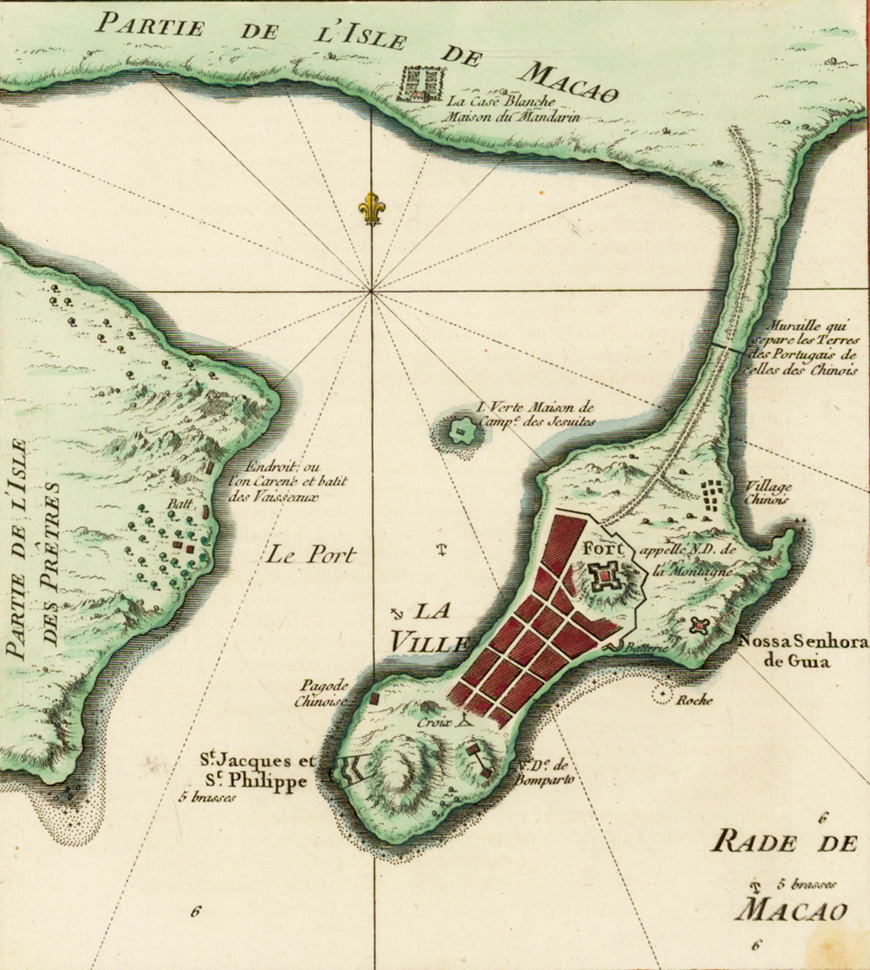
- Macao and "La Case Blanche" in 1757
- Chinese: 前山
- Postal: Sinshan
- Literal meaning: Front Hill
Transcriptions
Standard Mandarin
- Hanyu Pinyin: Qiánshān
- Wade–Giles: Ch‘ien-shan
Yue: Cantonese
- Jyutping: Cin⁴-saan¹

Qianshan is a subdistrict of Xiangzhou District, Zhuhai, in Guangdong Province in the People's Republic of China. Formerly an important military base overseeing the Portuguese-administered enclave of Macao, it is now a Chinese manufacturing center, with particular emphasis on household appliances, airconditioners, and printing supplies.

== Name ==
Qiánshān is the pinyin romanization of the Mandarin pronunciation of the subdistrict's Chinese name 前山, meaning "Front Hill". This was formerly also written as "Tsëen-shan" using Robert Morrison's system, "Ch‘ien-shan" using the Wade-Giles system, and as "Sinshan" for the Chinese Postal Map. The same characters are pronounced Cin-saan or Tchin-Sán in Cantonese; this was also formerly written "Tchin-shang" or "Chin San" by Portuguese authorities on Macao.

In historical records, the name also sometimes appears as Tsëen-shan-chae, from the addition of zhài (寨, j zaai⁶, "fort" or "stockade").

Qianshan was also formerly known as Casa Blanca, Casa-blanca, Casa Branca, Casa-branca, or Casa Braca from the white residence of the Macanese subprefect.

== History ==
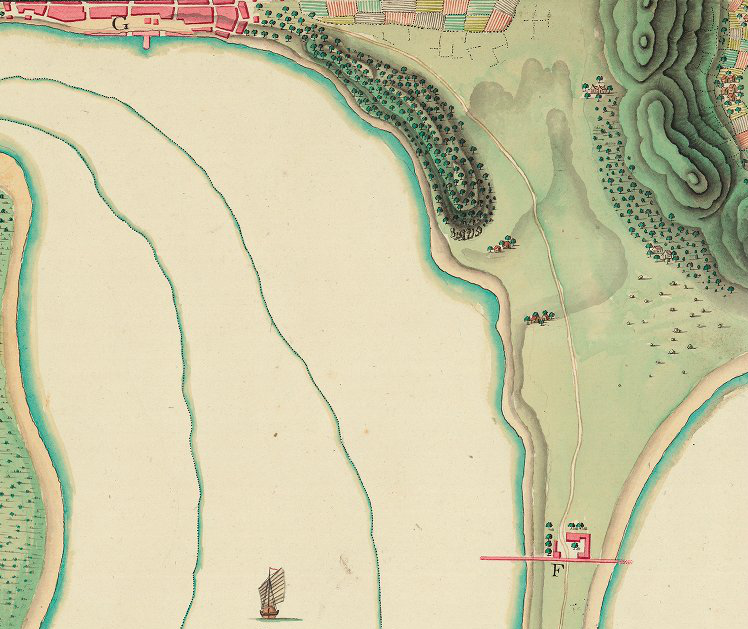
"Cazablanc" and the border wall in 1781

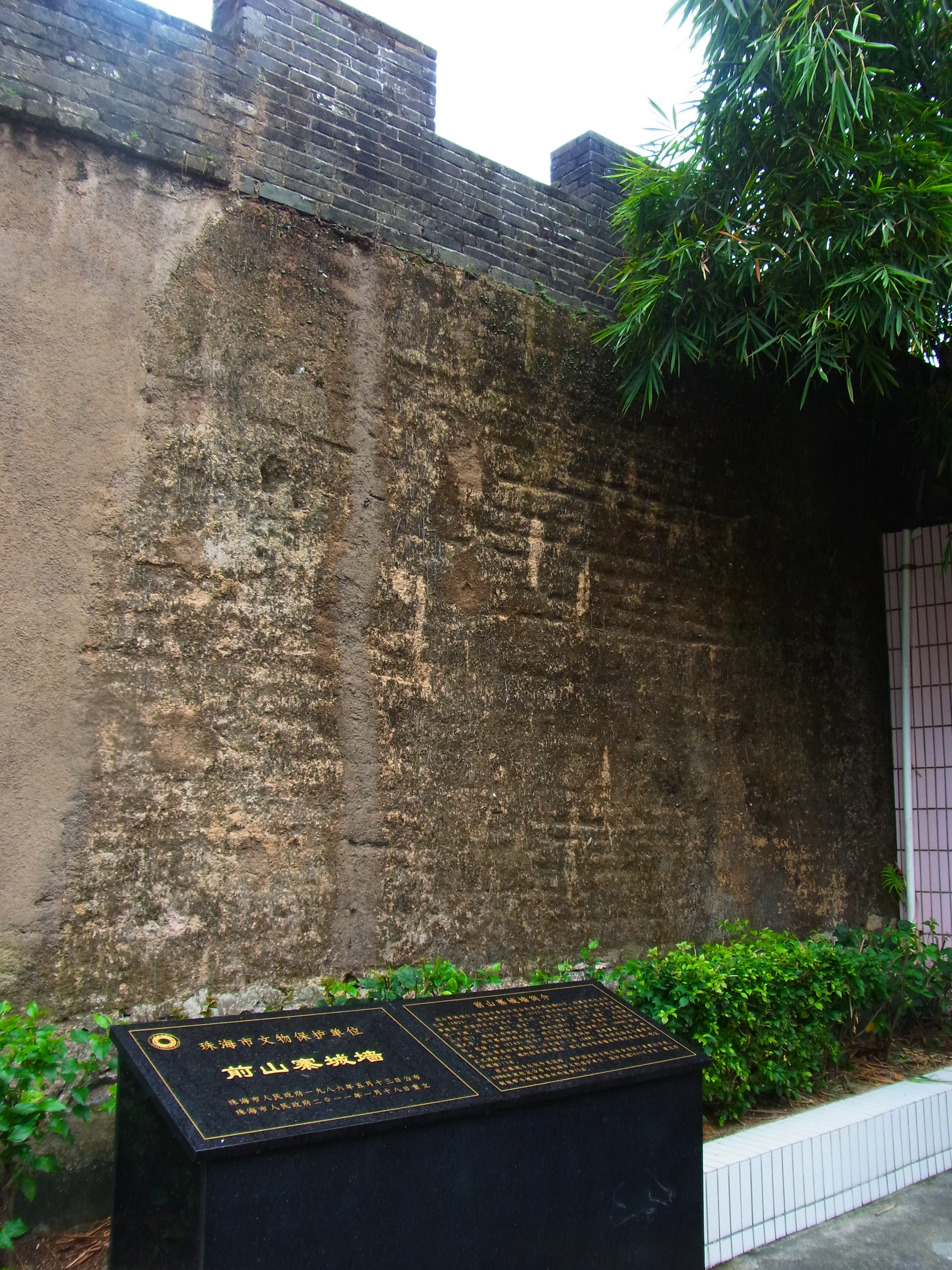
Remains of the old fort wall at Qianshan

Qianshan was formerly a separate village, first settled under the Southern Song in AD 1152 (Shaoxing 22) to produce salt from the Qianshan River. The location once overlooked the inner harbor of Macao, whose border wall lay 3 kilometers (2 mi) to its southwest and main settlement about 3 km farther. With the Portuguese developing a permanent enclave there during the late Ming, Qianshan—being the Chinese settlement nearest to its peninsula's northern border—was turned into a military outpost in 1621. By 1640, it comprised a 500-man garrison.

Qianshan became the seat of the subprefect or "keun-min-foo" (军民府; 軍民府; jūnmínfǔ) in 1731. He was charged with dealing with the foreign settlement and overseeing their trade with Guangzhou ("Canton"). As part of these duties, he controlled the permits needed for pilots (引水人, yǐnshuǐrén) of the ships sailing north through the Humen ("Bocca Tigris" or "Bogue") to the Huangpu Anchorage ("Whampoa", now Pazhou). He would ensure that foreign ships headed upriver had some cargo apart from silver dollars and bullion. He was also sometimes obliged to quarantine Macao's market, prohibiting Chinese farmers and merchants from trading there and supplying its food, in order to maintain the freedom of the area's Chinese to practice Buddhist and local rituals, which the Portuguese periodically attempted to prohibit. In the lead-up to the First Opium War, Lin Zexu and Deng Tingzhen visited Qianshan during their procession from Xiangshan (now Zhongshan) to visit the Portuguese authorities at Macao on 3 September 1839.

From 1862 to 1874, the Qianshan River was thoroughly dredged by Chinese authorities to create a safe shipping channel for the communities on its banks, including Qianshan. On 22–23 September 1874, Qianshan was hit by a devastating typhoon: around 4000 were killed in Macao, Wanzai ("Lapa"), and Qianshan and hundreds of bodies that washed ashore had to be buried by local hospitals or incinerated by the government. The area continued to be pummeled by typhoons—56 in the century from 1883 to 1983—but none on the scale of the 1874 disaster.

Qianshan benefited from Deng Xiaoping's Opening Up Policy and was granted town status in 1987. As settlements throughout the Pearl River Delta expanded, though, Qianshan no longer formed a separate settlement and was reorganized as a subdistrict of Zhuhai's Xiangzhou District in August 2001. Qianshan Port, which opened onto the Qianshan River, was closed in the 2000s, with its ticket hall becoming a warehouse and the waterfront being developed as a public park.

== Landmarks ==
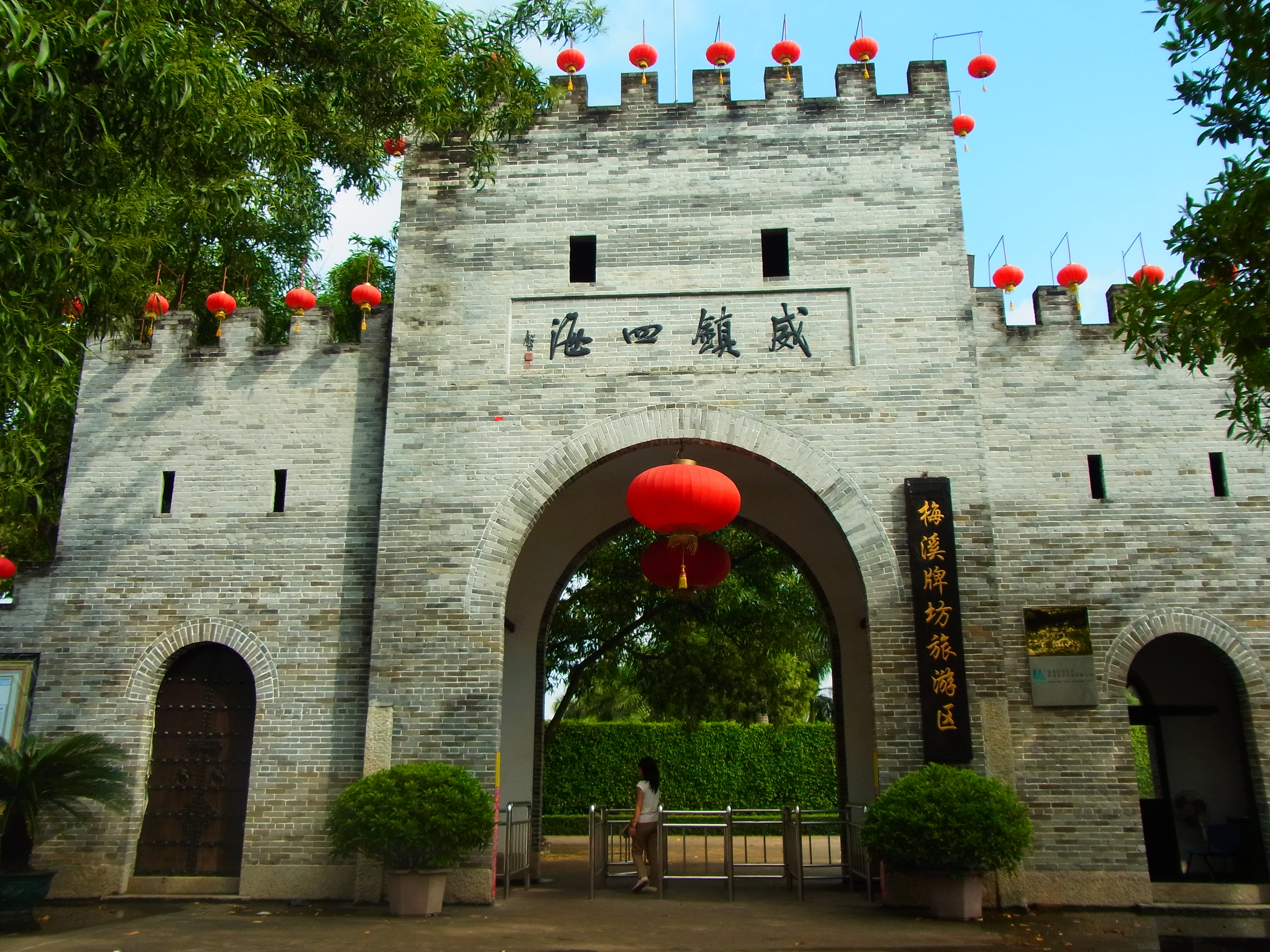
Entrance to the Meixi Royal Stone Archways

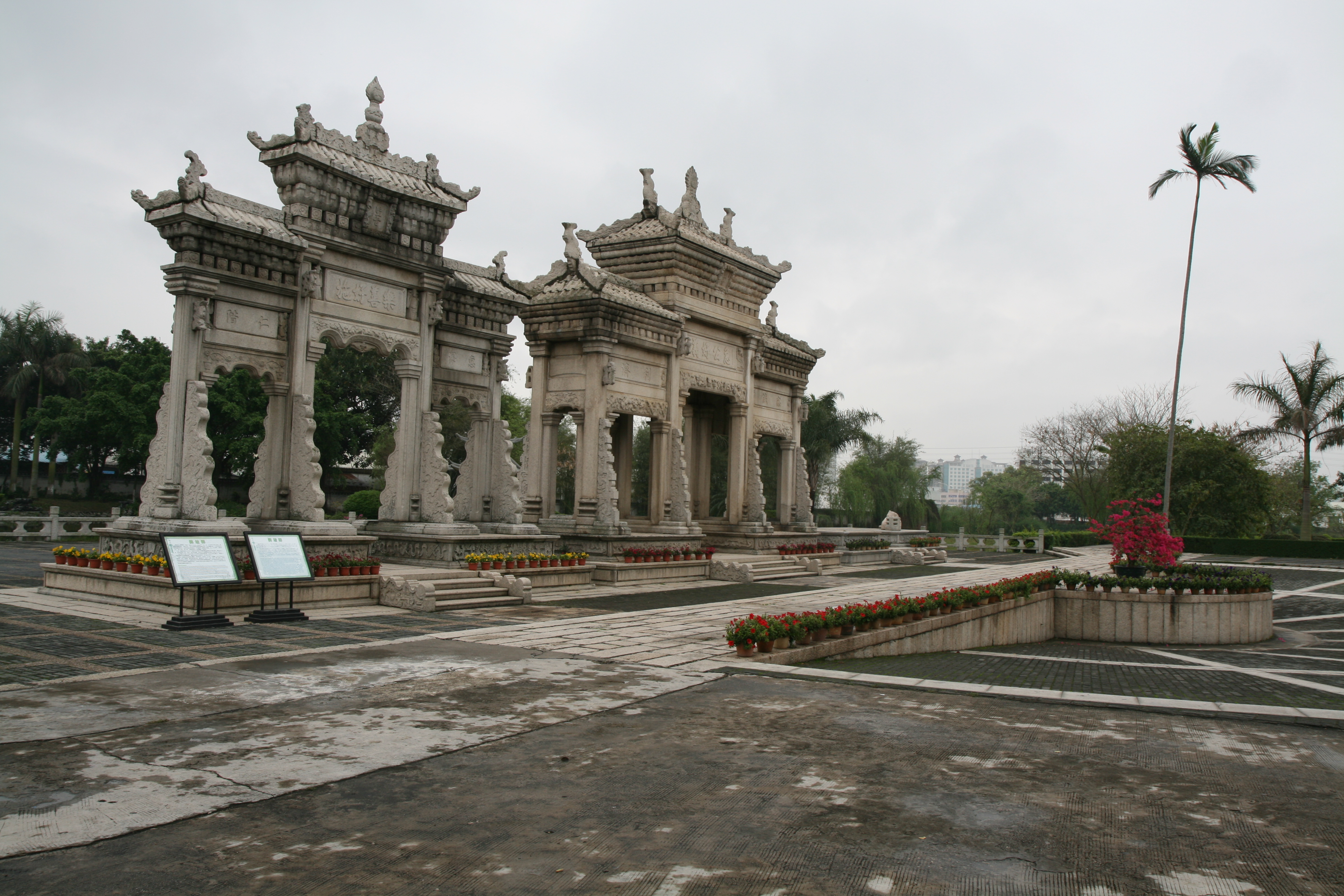
The Meixi Archways

Qianshan's Meixi Village is the home to the Meixi Royal Stone Archways. The three engraved granite archways were built by order of the Guangxu Emperor in 1886 and 1891 in honor of Chen Fang (陈芳; 陳芳; Chén Fāng) or Chun Afong, a native of Meixi who served as China's first consul to Hawaii and became a prominent philanthropist. It is surrounded by a 126,000 m^{2} (31-acre) park covering the old Chen estate, expanded by Chen's son Tony (陈席儒; 陳席儒; Chén Xírú), and its gardens. The site also houses the Waxworks Hall of Historical Figures of Zhuhai and a folk art exhibition.

The Agricultural Paradise is an agricultural tourism park affiliated with the Zhuhai Agricultural Scientific Research Demonstration Base. It covers 133 hectares (330 acres) at the foot of Mt Shuanglong in Meixi Village. It also serves as a demonstration facility in its own right, as with its research into techniques for growing organic olecranon peaches (鹰嘴桃; 鷹嘴桃; yīngzuǐtáo; 'eagle-beak peaches') in the Pearl River Delta.

Since 2010, Qianshan Waterfront has been developed as a large community park.

== Economy ==
Through the early stages of Qianshan's history, the main industry was refining salt from the Qianshan River under the auspices of the Jindou Bay Saltworks in Xiangshan, which began operation under the Tang.

Under Deng Xiaoping's Opening Up Policy, Zhuhai was established as one of China's first special economic zones in 1980. Companies based in Qianshan enjoy preferential government policies, and some have grown into some of the largest firms in the world.

Qianshan-based Gree Electric Appliances (est. 1989), the world's largest residential air-conditioner manufacturer, operates factories in China, Brazil, and Pakistan. It is listed on the Shenzhen Stock Exchange. The Qianshan Interior Decoration and Electric Appliance Marketplace is the biggest in the Zhujiang River Delta.

Xiangzhou District as a whole is the world leader in printing supplies, producing 70% of the world's color ribbons and 60% of its ink cartridges. Qianshan-based Apex Technology (est. 1991), also listed in Shenzhen, is a major producer of integrated circuit chips and printing supplies. It purchased the American printer company Lexmark on 30 November 2016 for $3.9 billion.

== Culture ==
Mandarin is used for educational and official purposes, while the local dialect is a form of Cantonese. During the 1990s and 2000s, however, an influx of migrants meant that those holding local hukous were outnumbered 2:1 by natives of other parts of China.

The Phoenix-Rooster Dance is a local form of the mix of dance and costume seen in lion and dragon dancing. Performers construct a 1.7-meter (5.6 ft) bird costume out of bamboo and other materials that can turn its head and flap its wings. Performances run through a gamut of emotions and activities, attested since 1621 during the late Ming. The art came to Xiangshan County in the early Qing and became particularly associated with Qianshan during the early Republican Period when the performer Li Fuwu opened a studio that taught both kung fu and the dance. His pupils Bao Liu and Li Shoushan continued the tradition, which is still celebrated at local cultural events.

== Events ==
Since around 2011, the Agricultural Paradise has held an annual Pumpkin Art Festival for the first six days of the Chinese New Year, awarding up to 10,000 rmb in prizes for big or unusual pumpkins. Other activities include magic shows, "pumpkin art dancing", pumpkin bowling, and pumpkin noodle-making.

== Transportation ==
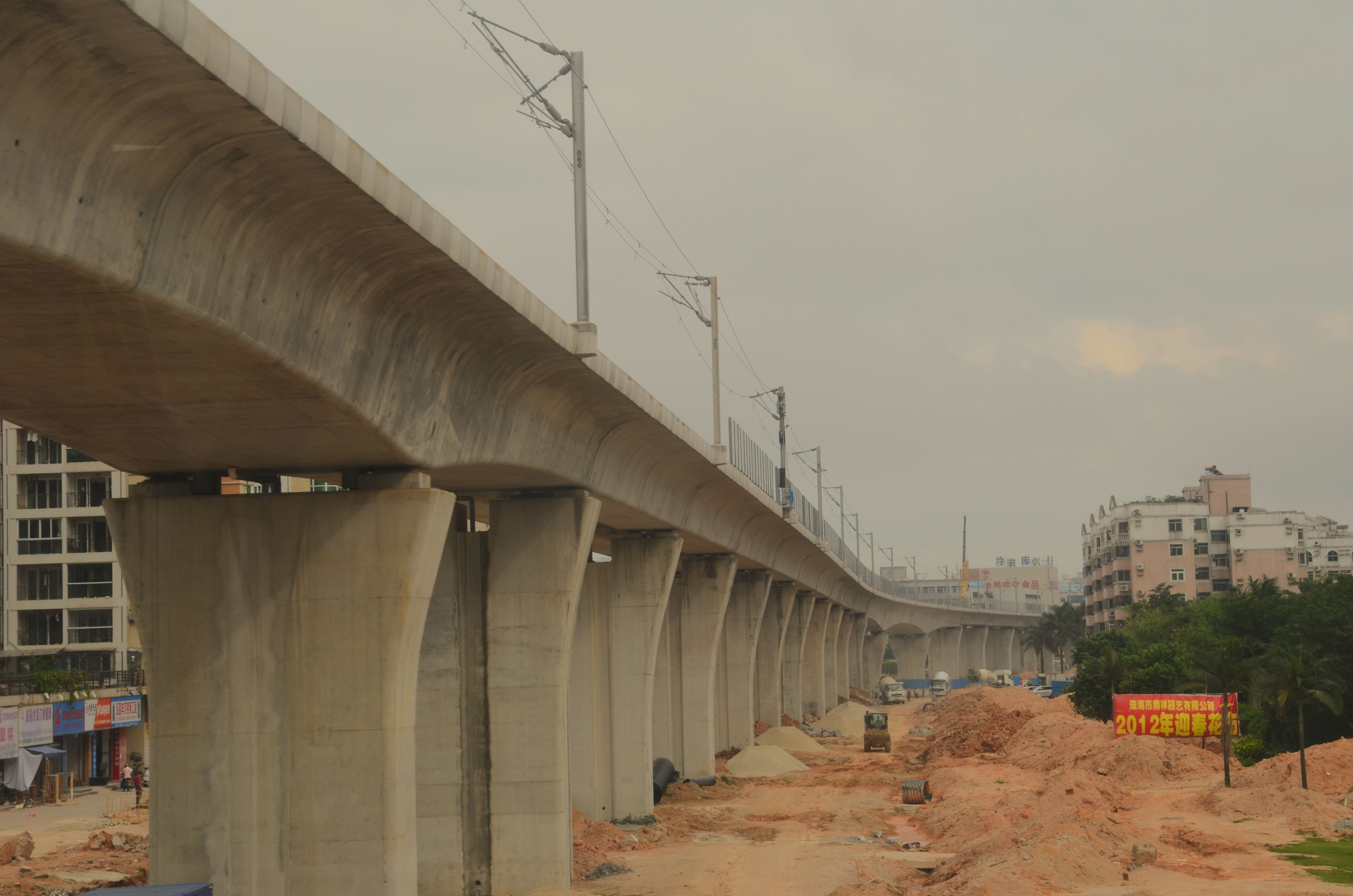
Construction of the Guangzhou–Zhuhai intercity railway in 2012.

Since 31 December 2012, Qianshan railway station has served by Guangzhou–Zhuhai intercity railway, connecting residents in Zhuhai to Guangzhou.

== See also ==
- List of township-level divisions of Guangdong
