= QSI International School of Zhuhai =

International school in Zhuhai, Guangdong, China

QSI International School of Zhuhai 珠海科爱赛国际学校

Location
- QSI International School of Zhuhai 1689 Yinwan Road, Wanzi Subdistrict, Xiangzhou District, Zhuhai 519000 Guangdong, China; Xiangzhou District, Zhuhai, Guangdong; China
- Coordinates: 22.17699°N 113.52662599999996°E

Information
- Type: International School (non-profit)
- Established: 1999
- Enrollment: 720
- Website: qsi.org/china/zhu/

QSI International School of Zhuhai
- Simplified Chinese: 珠海科爱赛国际学校
- Traditional Chinese: 珠海科愛賽國際學校
Transcriptions
Standard Mandarin
- Hanyu Pinyin: Zhūhǎi Kēàisài Guójì Xuéxiào
Yue: Cantonese
- Jyutping: zyu1 hoi2 ho2 oi3 coi3 gwok3 zai3 hok6 haau6

QSI International School of Zhuhai (Chinese: 珠海科爱赛国际学校) is an international school in Wanzi Subdistrict, Xiangzhou District, Zhuhai, Guangdong, China, serving ages 2–17. It was established in 1999 and is a part of Quality Schools International.

The Zhuhai Japanese Saturday School (珠海日本人補習校), a supplementary Japanese school, held classes at QSI Zhuhai, until 2012.

QSI Zhuhai was previously located in Building 2B, HengXin Industry District (恒信工业区), Gongbei Subdistrict, Xiangzhou District. It was later located on the campus of Zhuhai Girls' Middle School in Xiangzhou District.
