= Fu (administrative division) =

Traditional administrative division of Chinese origin

Chinese name
- Chinese: 府
Transcriptions
Standard Mandarin
- Hanyu Pinyin: fǔ
- Wade–Giles: fu^{3}
Yue: Cantonese
- Jyutping: fu^{2}
Middle Chinese
- Middle Chinese: /pɨo^{X}/

Vietnamese name
- Vietnamese alphabet: phủ
- Chữ Hán: 府

Korean name
- Hangul: 부
- Hanja: 府
Transcriptions
- Revised Romanization: bu
- McCune–Reischauer: pu

Japanese name
- Kanji: 府
- Hiragana: ふ
Transcriptions
- Revised Hepburn: fu

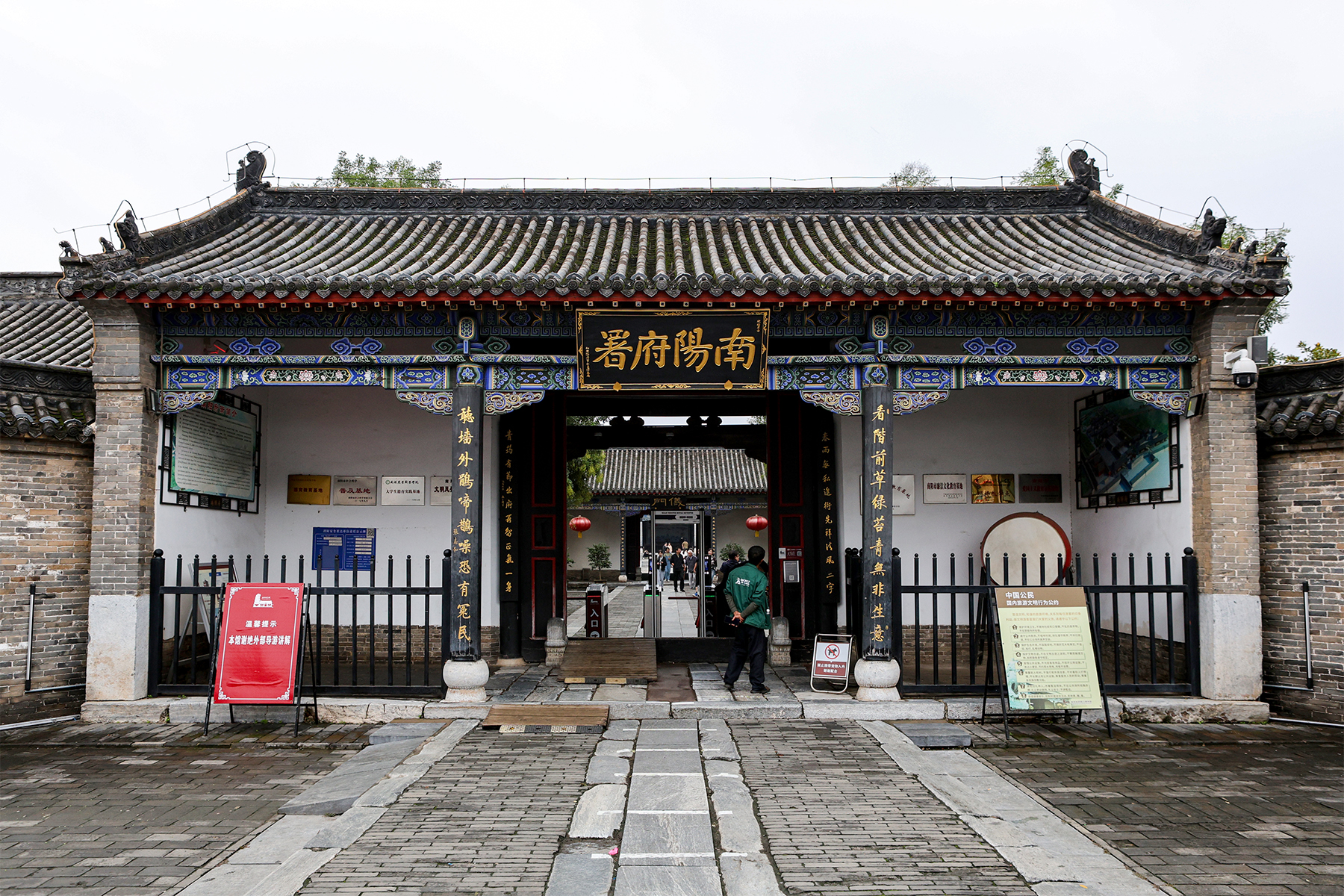
Nanyang Fu Yamen in Wancheng, Henan. It is the most well preserved Yamen complex in China.

Fu (Chinese: 府; pinyin: fǔ) is a traditional administrative division of Chinese origin used in the East Asian cultural sphere, translated variously as commandery, prefecture, urban prefecture, or city. They were first instituted as a regular form of administrative division of China's Tang Empire, but were later adopted in Vietnam, Japan and Korea. At present, only two fu still remain: the prefectures of Kyoto and Osaka in Japan.

The term fu is currently also used in Chinese to translate the provinces of Thailand, but not those of mainland China, Taiwan or other countries.

== Meaning ==
Fu (府) means an office or a command institution. The character appears in the Chinese words for "government" (政府; zhėngfǔ) or "official's residence" (府邸), and names of official institutions such as the "Imperial Household Department" (內務府; Nèiwùfǔ) in China or "Office of the President" (總統府; Zǒngtǒngfǔ) in Taiwan.

The Japanese language uses the Chinese character: (i) as a part of words, such as government (政府, seifu), shogunate (幕府, bakufu), Cabinet Office (内閣府, naikakufu), and legislature (立法府, rippō-fu), or (ii) as the name of a category of prefectures.

== China ==
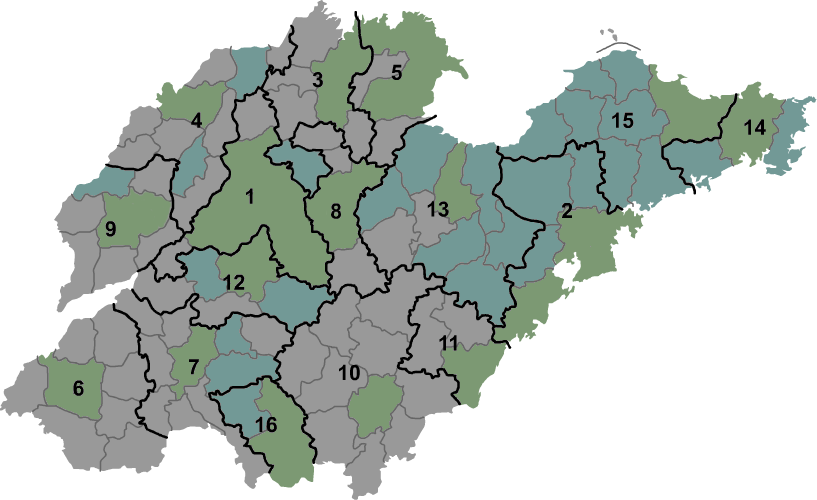
Above to below: subdivisions of Shandong Province during Northern Song dynasty (960-1127), Ming and Qing dynasty (1368-1911) and today. Bondaries of ancient prefectures and today's prefecture-level city are not exactly the same but shares many similarities.

One of the earlier uses of fu as part of the name of an administrative division was the Protectorate of the Western Regions (西域都護府; Xīyù Dūhù Fǔ) of the Han Empire in 60 BC. Duhu Fu, usually translated as "protectorate", literally meant "Office of the Commander-Protector".

In 627, the second emperor of the Tang dynasty, Emperor Taizong (r. 626−649), reorganized political divisions by setting up 10 circuits overseeing the Chinese prefectures, including 43 commanderies (都督府, dūdū fǔ, literally "Office of the Commander-Governor"), which were border prefectures with a more powerful governor. Zhou was the more common name for an inland prefecture. Dudu Fu was shortened to Fu and the convention developed that larger prefectures would be named fu, while smaller prefectures would be called zhou. One of the earliest cities to be called a fu was Jingzhao-fu (京兆府), which including the capital city Chang'an and Henan-fu, which including the secondary capital Luoyang during the Tang dynasty.

By the time of the 14th–century Ming dynasty, the term had become common across provinces: typically, each prefecture under province was called a fu. Fu of Ming and Qing dynasty are sometimes translated as "prefectures", Shuntian Prefecture for instance. Sub-prefectures, such as that which administered Macao's inner harbor from Qianshan, were called "military/civil fu" (t 軍民府, s 军民府, jūnmínfǔ).

After the end of the Qing dynasty in 1912, the Republic of China abolished fu in order to streamline administrative divisions, recategorizing them into counties or cities. The People's Republic of China inherited these divisions of mainland China in 1949 and did not reinstate the fu. Many former fu have become prefecture-level cities.

== Japan ==
As part of the Taika Reform in (645), the capitals of the provinces of Japan were named kokufu (国府; "province capitals"). The fu character is an element still found in several Japanese city names, such as Dazaifu (太宰府), Fuchū (府中), Hōfu (防府), Kōfu (甲府), Rifu (利府) and the old name for Shizuoka, Sunpu (駿府).

During the Meiji Restoration, the newly formed Meiji government enacted Fuhanken Sanchisei in 1868, splitting the country into three varieties of prefecture. One of these were fu, used for urban prefectures as opposed to rural prefectures (県, ken). The first two urban prefectures (府, fu) were created on 14 June 1868: Kyoto-fu and Hakodate-fu. By the end of 1868, 10 fu had been established: Kyoto, Hakodate, Osaka, Nagasaki, Edo (later Tokyo), Kanagawa, Watarai, Nara, Echigo (later Niigata) and Kōfu. Due to some prefectures gaining non-urban land or being amalgamated into other territories in 1869, three remained: Kyoto-fu, Osaka-fu and Tokyo-fu.

During the Second Sino-Japanese War, the Japanese government wished to tighten control of the local autonomy of the different areas of Tokyo. The Home Ministry published a plan to rename Tokyo to a metropolis (都, to), but the special wards of Tokyo (35 in 1938) objected to the plan. In 1943 the plan was implemented, and Tokyo-fu and Tokyo-shi were merged to become the current Tokyo Metropolis. This brought the number of fu in Japan to its current number of two: Kyoto-fu and Osaka-fu. There is currently a plan which will turn Osaka to a metropolis, which would leave the amount of urban prefectures to one if successful.

== Korea ==
Bu (부, 府) has been used in Korea since the Goryeo dynasty as a suffix designating a city. The city of Kaesong was designated Kaesong-bu in 995. The 1485 code of law Gyeongguk daejeon designates the city of Seoul as Hanseong-bu (漢城府) and Kaesong as Kaesong-bu. In the 17th century, additional areas were designated bu, including Ganghwa-bu, Suwon-bu and Gwangju-bu.

In 1895 after the Donghak Peasant Revolution and the Treaty of Shimonoseki, a series of wide changes called the Gabo Reform were enacted. One of these changes was to split the Eight Provinces of Korea into 23 bu: Andong, Chuncheon, Chungju, Daegu, Dongnae, Gangneung, Gongju, Haeju, Hamhŭng, Hanseong, Hongju, Incheon, Jeju, Jeonju, Jinju, Kaesŏng, Kanggye, Kapsan, Kyŏngsŏng, Naju, Namwon, P'yŏngyang and Ŭiju. The districts were named after the capitals of each district, and also included rural areas. A year later in August 1896, these districts were replaced by 13 new provinces, using the previous word do (도; 道).

After the Japan–Korea Treaty of 1910 and the occupation of Korea by Japan, many areas were renamed and local government was reorganised. On 1 April 1914, twelve bu were created: Seoul (then Gyeongseong-bu (京城府, Keijō-fu)), Incheon, Gunsan, Mokpo, Daegu, Busan, Masan, Pyongyang, Chinnampo, Sinuiju, Wonsan and Chongjin. Between 1930 and 1944, 10 more were added by the Japanese government: Kaesong and Hamhung in 1930, followed by Daejeon, Jeonju and Gwangju in 1935, Rason (1936), Haeju (1938), Jinju (1939), Kimchaek (1941) and Hungnam (1944).

After the Potsdam Declaration in 1945 and Japan's defeat in World War II, as well as the division of Korea, the term has no longer been in use.

== Vietnam ==
The word was borrowed in Sino-Vietnamese as phủ (府), and used as an administrative unit in 15–19th-century Vietnam. Administrative division of new frontier territories into phủ was particularly used as the Vietnamese expanded southwards and inland. The administrative reorganization by Minh Mạng along Chinese models following the death of his father in 1832, fixed the position of the phủ as an intermediary administrative division between the new larger unit of the tỉnh province, and the existing local huyện sub-prefecture or district, and power was concentrated with provincial governors. The position of local prefects and district heads remained unaffected.
