= Zhuhai No.3 High School =

Zhuhai No.3 High School 珠海市第三中学 Zhūhai Shì Dìsān Zhōngxúe

Location
- No.2, Meihua Dong Rd, Xiangzhou, Zhuhai

Information
- Type: Public High School
- Motto: Seek truth, advocate kindness and good. 求真、崇善、尚美
- Established: 1963
- School district: Xiangzhou, Zhuhai, Guangdong,China
- President: Wang Jian
- Grades: Grade 10(or 1) to Grade 12(or 3)
- Website: ZH3Z

Zhuhai No.3 High School (ZH3Z; Chinese: 珠海市第三中学; pinyin: Zhūhai Shì Dìsān Zhōngxúe; colloquially known as 珠海三中, Zhūhǎi Sānzhōng) is located in Xiangzhou, Zhuhai, Guangdong.
