= Shandong Province Zaozhuang No. 3 High School =

- No.121 Jianhua West Road, Shizhong District, Zaozhuang City, Shandong Province; China

Information
- Established: 1956
- Rector: Wu Xiuhong

Zaozhuang No. 3 High School is a senior high school. Founded in early 1956, it is a model high school in Shandong Province.

It is a standardized school in Shandong Province, a key high school in Shandong Province and a high school teaching model school in Shandong Province.

== Histories ==
- On October 10, 1956, the school was created.
- In 1962, it was identified as a provincial key high school by the Shandong Education Department.
- In 1979, it was designated as one of the first nineteen key high schools in the province.
- In 1996, Zaozhuang Municipal Party Committee and Municipal Government decided to create the West Campus based on the East School of Zaozhuang Third Middle School.
- In September 1999, the first phase of the West Campus of No.3 Middle School was completed and enrolled the freshmen in the first year of high school.
- In 2000, the school established the goal of creating one thousand model schools at the national level.
- In 2006, the school was honored as one of the first high school teaching model schools in Shandong Province.
- In 2009, the school was recognized as an advanced unit of art education in Shandong Province
- In 2010, Zaozhuang New Town started to establish the New Town Campus of Sanzhong Middle School.

== School District ==
As of February 2024, the school has two campuses in the middle of the city and the new city, covering a total area of 715 acres, with a total building area of 140,000 square meters, and the school's assets amount to 180 million yuan.

In 2010, Zaozhuang New Town started to establish the Third Middle School New Town Campus.Currently 98 high school classes.

The school's West Campus is a public boarding school with closed paramilitary management and more than 5,000 three students.

== Famous Alumni ==
- Li Jiaxiang: Currently Deputy Secretary of the Party Group and Vice Minister of the Ministry of Transportation and Communications, as well as Director and Secretary of the Party Group of the Civil Aviation Administration of China (at the full ministerial level).
- Ma Teng: Host of Hefei Radio and Television "Hefei News Broadcast", "Midday News", "CPPCC Forum", "New Finance and Economy".

== Related sites ==
Zaozhuang Third Middle School Official Website
