= Nanjing No. 3 High School =

High school in Nanjing, China

Coordinates: 32°02′08″N 118°47′07″E

Nanjing No. 3 High School Chinese: 南京市第三高级中学
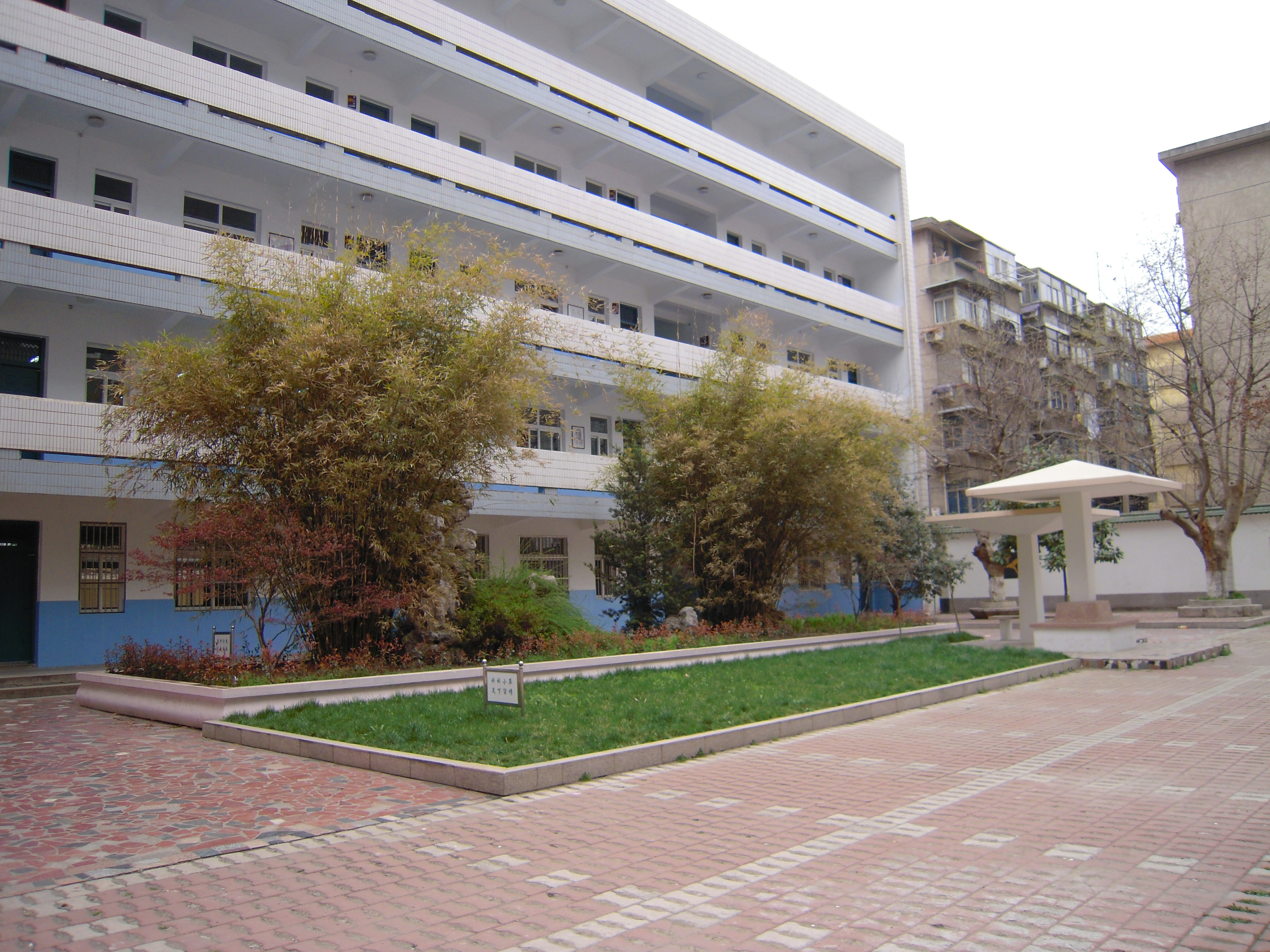

Information
- Motto: Truth
- Established: 1902; 123 years ago

Nanjing No. 3 High School (simplified Chinese: 南京市第三高级中学; traditional Chinese: 南京市第三高級中學, also known as Chinese: 南京三中) is a high school in central Nanjing, China. It was founded in 1902. The school is housed on Li Xiucheng's house. The educator and reformer Tao Xingzhi served as the school's principal for seven years and made "truth" the school's motto.
