= Zhuhai National Hi-Tech Industrial Development District =

Industrial complex in Zhuhai, China

Zhuhai National High-Tech Industrial Development District (Chinese: 珠海高新技术产业开发区) was established in December, 1992 by the State Council of the People's Republic of China. It is also called Zhuhai National Hi-Tech Industrial Development Zone. It has an initial area of 9.8 square kilometers. Following a 1999 adjustment, it now includes four industrial parks: Nanping (南屏), Sanzao (三灶), Baijiao (白蕉) and Xinqing (新青), and an innovation coast.

== Geography ==
The main part of Zhuhai National High-Tech Industrial Development District is located in the northern part of the city of Zhuhai, composed of Tangjia (唐家), Jinding (金鼎), Qi'ao (淇澳), covers an area of 139 square kilometers. To the west and north is Zhongshan City. To the south and southwest is Dongkeng (东坑), Qianshan (前山) and Shenqian (神前), Xiangzhou (香洲). With the main transportation facilities such as Jingzhu Expressway, Western Guangdong Coastal Expressway (广东西部沿海高速公路) and Guangzhou-Zhuhai Intercity Railway running through it, Zhuhai National High-Tech Industrial Development District is the main portal in and out of Zhuhai. It is 18 kilometers north of Macau, 110 km south of Guangzhou, and near Hong Kong and Shenzhen across the sea.

== Economy ==
In 1998, the region's developed area was less than one square kilometer. With 13 companies in the area, Zhuhai National High-Tech Industrial Development District's industrial output was 1.8 billion yuan, and 10 million yuan of tax in that year. In 1999 the municipal government adjusted the high-tech zone to the "four parks and one Coast (four technology-based industrial parks and one Innovation Beach)". With rapid economic development, the quantity of the companies in the zone changed from 50 to more than 1000, and its industrial output increased from 11.3 billion yuan to 64.1 billion yuan.

In 2008, the regional GDP (gross domestic product) was 23.2 billion yuan, with an increase of 8%; its above-scale industrial output value was of 112.8 billion yuan, with an increase of 11%; its high-tech enterprise output value was of 49.6 billion yuan, accounting for 44% of the total industrial output, with an increase of 8%; its total export was of 9.95 billion dollars, with an increase of 2%.

In 2009, the regional GDP (gross domestic product) was 25 billion yuan, with an increase of 8%; its total industrial output was of 114.5 billion yuan, with an increase of 8%; its high-tech enterprise output value was of 55.6 billion yuan, accounting for 49% of the total industrial output; its total export was of 7.5 billion dollars.

== Infrastructure ==
=== Expressway ===
Zhuhai National High-Tech Industrial Development District is an intersection of Jingzhu Expressway, Western Guangdong Coastal Expressway and Jiangzhu Expressway (江珠高速公路).

=== Railway ===
Guangzhou-Zhuhai Railway started running on December 29, 2012.

=== Intercity railway ===
It takes only 40 minutes from Zhuhai to Guangzhou taking Guangzhou-Zhuhai Intercity Railway, and less than 1 hour to any city of Pearl River Delta. The intercity railway has five stations in Zhuhai. And two of the five, Zhuhai North Railway Station and Tang Jia Wan Station, are located in Hi-Tech Zone.

=== Bridge ===
Zhuhai is connected via the Hong Kong-Zhuhai-Macau Bridge which connects to Hong Kong and Macao.

=== Port ===
Zhuhai Port (composed of Gaolan Port, Wanshan Port, Jiuzhou Port, Xiangzhou Port, Tangjia Port, Hongwan Port and Doumen Port), is a main hub port of China's coast, and the first deep-water port in Southern China. At present, Zhuhai Port has a total of 107 productive berths, including 10 deep-water berths, with the transport capacity of 25.08 million tons each year. The Gongbei Port of Entry is China's second largest land port, and Jiuzhou Port is China's largest port of waterway passenger transport.

=== Airport ===
Zhuhai Jinwan Airport has opened 32 domestic routes. Along with the airports in Hongkong, Macao, Guangzhou and Shenzhen, planes here can arrive at each major city in the world. At present, Zhuhai airport and Hongkong airport have strategic cooperation, mainly to carry out the international cargo business.

=== Power supply ===
Zhuhai possesses plenty of power resources. Zhuhai Power Plant has the installed capacity of 3.72 million kilowatt, which can fully guarantee the life and production of electricity needs.

=== Water supply ===
Zhuhai possesses plenty of water resources. Zhuhai has the water supply capacity of 1.8 million tons each day. It also supply water to Macau.

== Education ==
Zhongshan University, Jinan University, Jilin University, Beijing Institute of Technology, Beijing Normal University and Zunyi Medical College are in the zone. At present, the number of Zhuhai's college students is up to 80000, ranking the second place in Guangdong province.

== Industry ==
=== Software industry ===
At present some software enterprise like Yuanguang (远光软件) and Kingsoft are awarded as the key software enterprises of the national plan. 3 enterprises (including Kingsoft) have passed the assessment of CMM (Capability Maturity Model)3, 23 enterprises have the ISO-9000 certification, and 4 enterprises have the qualification certification of system integration.

=== Semiconductor material and chip production ===
The main enterprises are: Zhuhai Juli Integrated Circuit Design Company (珠海炬力集成电路设计有限公司) (NASDAQ listed), Eastcompeace (东信和平智能卡股份有限公司) (Shenzhen Stock Exchange listed ), Nanker Group (南科集团), etc.

=== Electrical machinery industry ===
The main enterprises are: Guangdong Dehao Runda Electric Limited by Share Ltd (广东德豪润达电气股份有限公司) (Shenzhen Stock Exchange listed), Wanlida Electrical (珠海万力达电气股份有限公司), Keli Electric Appliances (珠海市可利电气有限公司), Appliance Co of America (Zhuhai) (ACA北美电器), Iwatani (Zhuhai) (岩谷气具（珠海）有限公司), Double Happiness Appliances (双喜电器), etc.

=== Communication equipment industry ===
The main enterprises are: Gree Xinyuan Electronic (珠海格力新元电子有限公司), Panasonic Motor (珠海松下马达有限公司), Philips Electronics, Hua Guan Electronics (珠海华冠电子科技有限公司), Yueke Tsinghua Electronic Ceramics (珠海粤科京华电子陶瓷有限公司), etc.

=== Pharmaceutical industry ===
Zhuhai has 41 pharmaceutical companies and 90 medical equipment manufacturing enterprises. The output of Zhuhai's biological pharmaceutical industry ranked third in Guangdong province for years. The main enterprises are: Zhuhai Livzon Pharmaceutical Group Limited by Share Ltd (丽珠集团), Zhuhai Federal Pharmaceutical Company Ltd (珠海联邦制药有限公司), etc.
