= Nanning No.3 High School =

Coordinates: 22°48′14″N 108°21′16″E

南宁市第三中学 Nanning No.3 High School 广西壮族自治区重点中学 Key High School of the Guangxi Zhuang Autonomous Region 广西壮族自治区示范性普通高中 Demonstrated High School of the Guangxi Zhuang Autonomous Region

Location
- 5 Qingshan Road, Qingxiu District, Nanning, Guangxi, China

Information
- Type: Public
- Motto: 敦品力学
- Established: 1897
- Principal: Heqing Huang
- Faculty: 247
- Enrollment: 3229
- Website: http://www.nnsz.com/

Nanning No.3 High School is a premier high school located in Nanning, Guangxi, China.

== See also ==
- Nanning No.2 High School
- Liuzhou Senior High School
