= Zhuhai Zijing Middle School =

Zhuhai Zijing Middle School 珠海市紫荆中学 Zhūhǎi Shì Zǐjīng Zhōngxúe

Location
- No.1099, Fenghuang Bei Rd, Xiangzhou, Zhuhai (Fenghuang Rd Campus); No.1, Taoyuan Rd, Xiangzhou, Zhuhai (Taoyuan Rd Campus)

Information
- Type: Public Middle School
- Motto: Enjoy learning, seek truth, excel at communication, bold in blazing new trails. 乐学，求真，从善，创美。
- Established: 1960
- School district: Xiangzhou, Zhuhai, Guangdong,China
- President: Guo Shaoling
- Faculty: About 300
- Grades: Grade 7 to Grade 9
- Enrollment: About 3000
- Colors: White and purple
- Campus Area: 72638 square metres
- Spirits: Build Beautiful Individuals through Beautiful Education 用美的教育造就美的新人

Zhuhai Zijing Middle School (Chinese: 珠海市紫荆中学; pinyin: Zhūhai Shì Zǐjīng Zhōngxúe; colloquially known as 紫荆中学, Zǐjīng Zhōngxúe) is located in Xiangzhou, Zhuhai, Guangdong, it's a first-class middle school in Zhuhai, also one of the Provincial Model Junior High Schools.

== History ==
Zhuhai Zijing Middle School was founded in 1960 as Xiangzhou Fishermen Middle School (香洲渔民中学; pinyin: Xiāngzhōu Yúmín Zhōngxúe). In 1962, it changed its name into Xiangzhou Middle School (香洲中学; pinyin: Xiāngzhōu Zhōngxúe) and Zhuhai No.1 High School (珠海市第一中学; pinyin: Zhūhǎi Shì Dìyī Zhōngxúe) in July 1981. In 1979, it set up the senior high department. The senior campus was being put into use at Meihua Xi Rd in 2000.

In 2008, the junior Dept was separated from Zhuhai No.1 High School and changed its name into the current one.

In 2011, the Zhuhai Taoyuan Middle School (珠海市桃园中学; pinyin: Zhūhǎi Shì Táoyuán Zhōngxúe) was merged into Zhuhai Zijing Middle School as Taoyuan Rd Campus (桃园路校区; pinyin: Táoyuán Lù Xiàoqū). The original campus was called Fenghuang Rd Campus (凤凰路校区; pinyin: Fènghuáng Lù Xiàoqū).
