= Gongbei Subdistrict =

Coordinates: 22.22968°N 113.55273°E

Gongbei 拱北街道
- Subdistrict
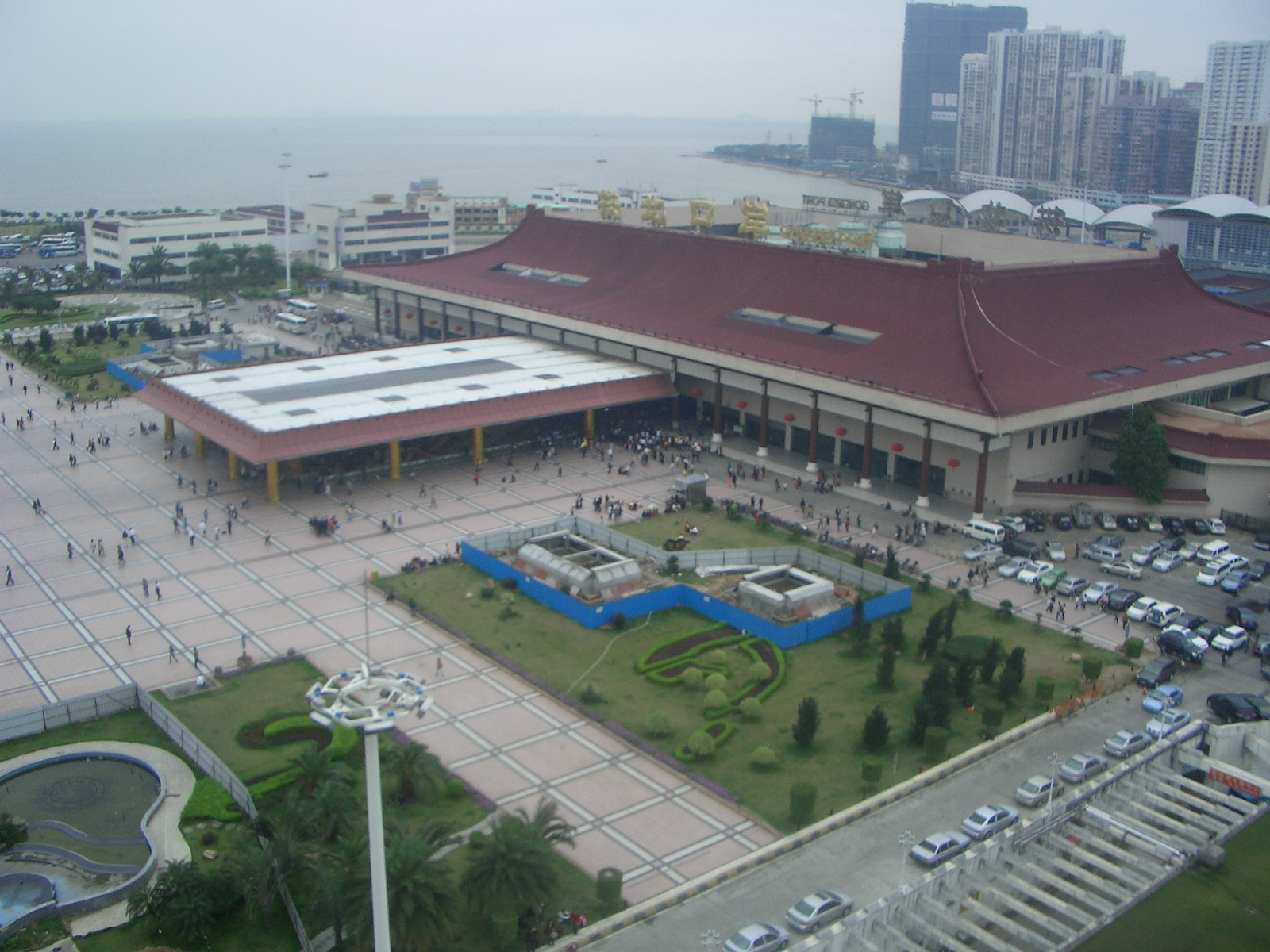
- Gongbei Port of Entry
- Interactive map of Gongbei
- Country: China
- Province: Guangdong
- Prefecture: Zhuhai
- District: Xiangzhou
- Time zone: UTC+8 (China Standard Time)

Gongbei Subdistrict (Chinese: 拱北街道; pinyin: Gǒngběi jiēdào; Jyutping: Gung^{2}baak^{1} gaai^{3}dou^{6}) is a township-level division situated in Xiangzhou District, Zhuhai, Guangdong, China.

== Education ==
QSI International School of Zhuhai was previously in Building 2B, Hengain Industry District (恒信工业区), Gongbei Subdistrict.

== See also ==
- List of township-level divisions of Guangdong
