= Xiangzhou, Zhuhai =

Xiangzhou 香洲区
- District
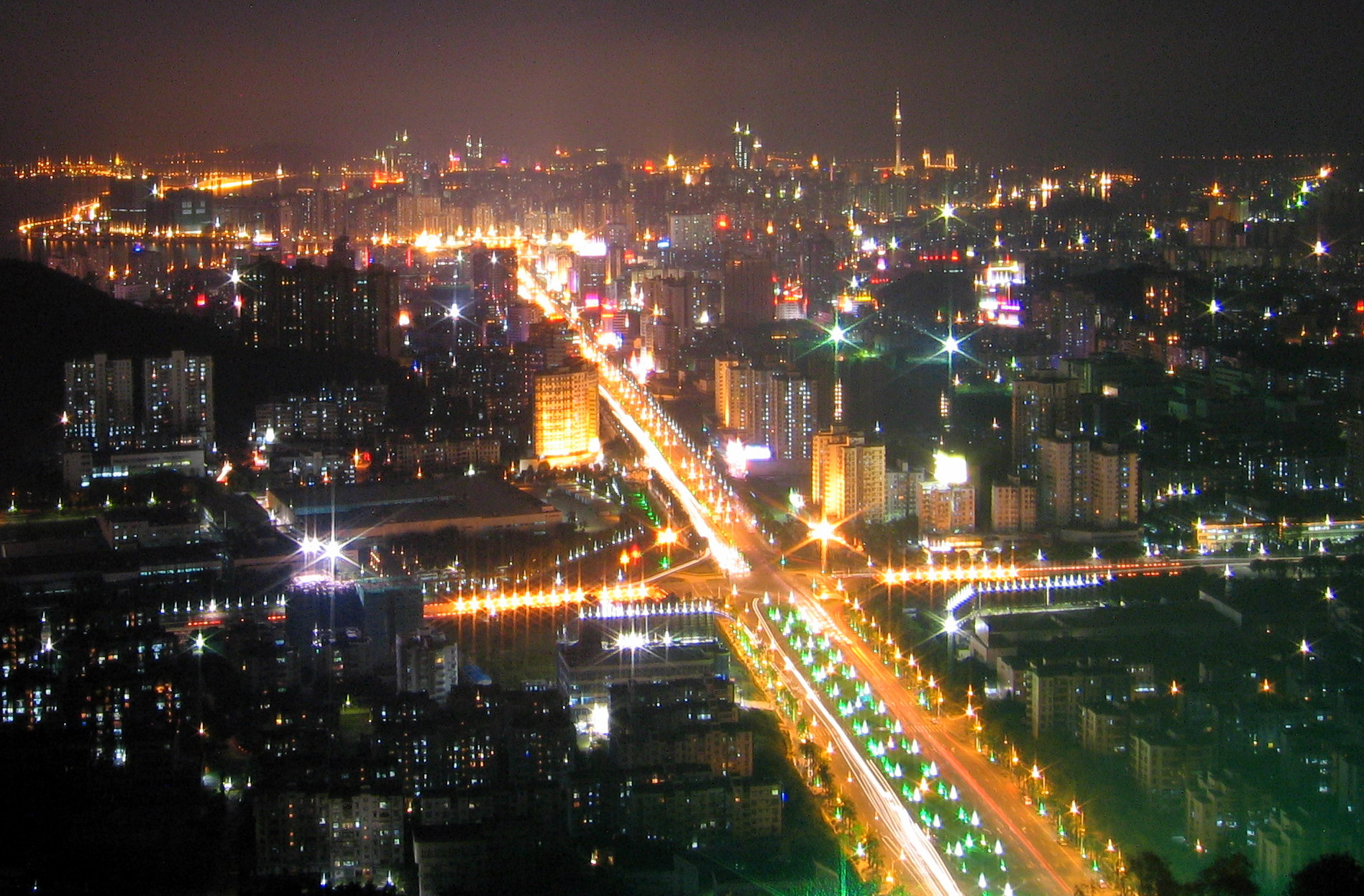

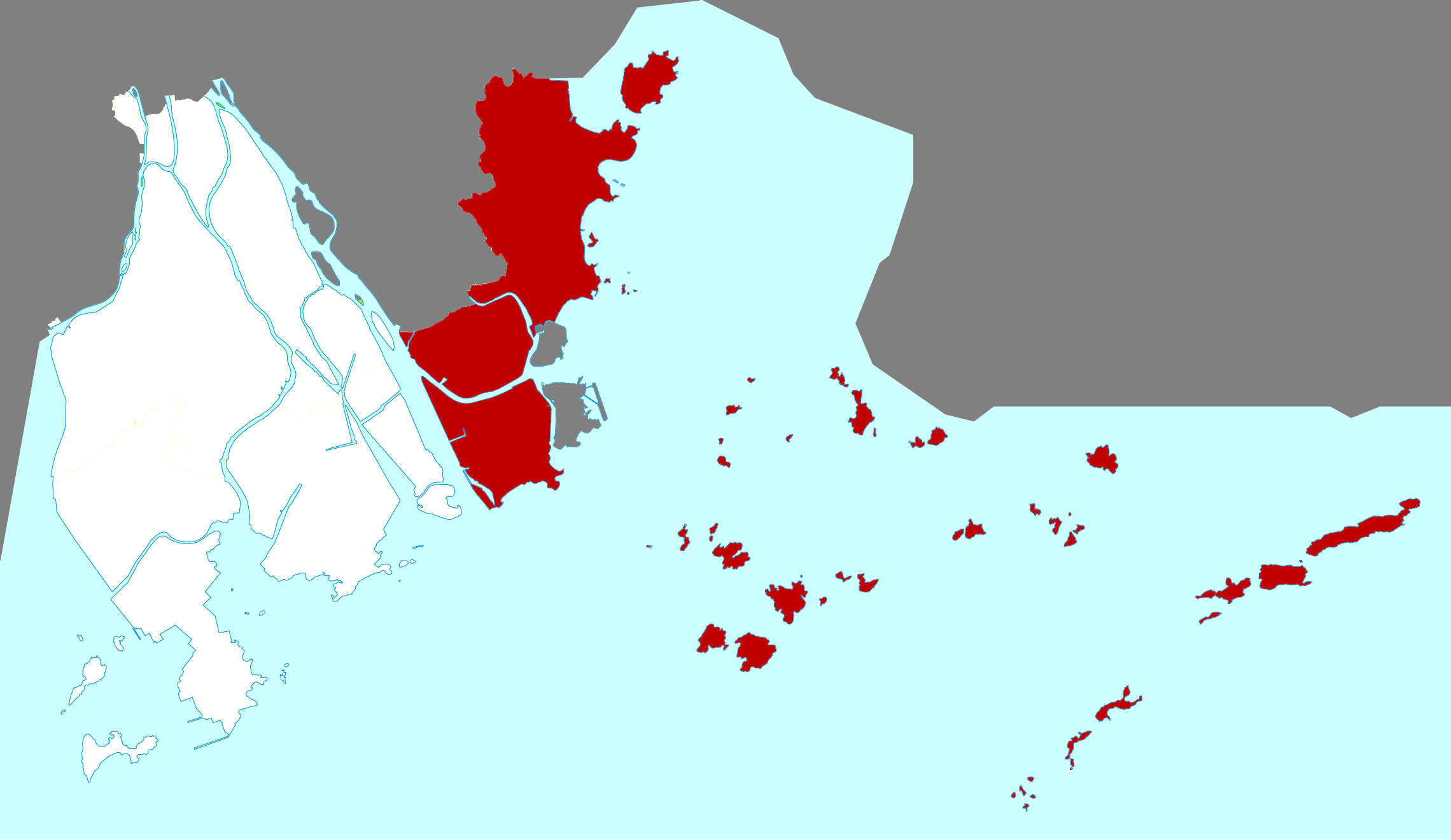
- Location in Zhuhai

- Location in Guangdong
- Coordinates: 22°15′58″N 113°32′36″E
- Country: People's Republic of China
- Province: Guangdong
- Prefecture-level city: Zhuhai

Area
  - Total: 476 km^{2} (184 sq mi)

Population (2020)
  - Total: 1,384,317
  - Density: 2,910/km^{2} (7,530/sq mi)
- Time zone: UTC+8 (China Standard)
- Postal code: 519000
- Website: http://www.zhxz.gov.cn/

Xiangzhou, Zhuhai
- Simplified Chinese: 香洲区
- Traditional Chinese: 香洲區
Transcriptions
Standard Mandarin
- Hanyu Pinyin: Xiāngzhōu qū

Xiangzhou District (simplified Chinese: 香洲区; traditional Chinese: 香洲區; pinyin: Xiāngzhōu qū; lit. 'Fragrant Inlet') is a district of Zhuhai, Guangdong province. It is located at the southwest corner of the Pearl River Delta, bordering Macau to the south and southeast. The district is the political, financial, transit, and cultural center of Zhuhai.

== Administration ==
The district is divided in 9 subdistricts and 6 towns. It includes numerous small islands in the Pearl River Estuary, including many situated to the south of Hong Kong.

Name		Chinese (S)	Hanyu Pinyin	Population (2010)	Area (km^{2})
Meihua Subdistrict		梅华街道	Méihuá jiēdào	91,172	9.80
Gongbei Subdistrict		拱北街道	Gǒngběi jiēdào	105,130	10.00
Jida Subdistrict		吉大街道	Jídà jiēdào	81,088	11.70
Cuixiang Subdistrict		翠香街道	Cuìxiāng jiēdào	106,661	28.00
Shishan Subdistrict		狮山街道	Shīshān jiēdào	56,956	8.20
Xiangwan Subdistrict		香湾街道	Xiāngwān jiēdào	48,482	32.40
Qianshan Subdistrict		前山街道	Qiánshān jiēdào	184,738	53.00
Fengshan Subdistrict		凤山街道	Fèngshān jiēdào	184,738	53.00
Wanzi Subdistrict		湾仔街道	Wānzǐ jiēdào	26,645	30.50
Nanping town		南屏镇	Nánpíng zhèn	70,934	60.70
Zhuhai National Hi-Tech Industrial Development District	Tangjiawan town	唐家湾镇	Tángjiāwān zhèn	109,152	130.00
Guangdong-Macao In-Depth Cooperation Zone in Hengqin	Hengqin town	横琴镇	Héngqín zhèn	6,914	476.00
Wanshan Marine; Development; Experimental Zone	Guishan town	桂山镇	Guìshān zhèn	1,745	18.00
Wanshan Marine; Development; Experimental Zone	Dan'gan town	担杆镇	Dān'gān zhèn	1,860	40.00
Wanshan Marine; Development; Experimental Zone	Wanshan town	万山镇	Wànshān zhèn	1,208	23.00

== Education ==
Zhuhai Girls' Middle School, a private girls' junior-senior high school, is in Xiangzhou District.

QSI International School of Zhuhai is in Wanzi Subdistrict, Xiangzhou District. QSI Zhuhai previously was in Building 2B, Hengxin Industry District (恒信工业区), Gongbei Subdistrict, Xiangzhou District. It was later on the campus of Zhuhai Girls' Middle School in Xiangzhou District.

The Zhuhai Japanese Saturday School (珠海日本人補習校), a supplementary Japanese school, holds classes at QSI Zhuhai.
