= Zhuhai =

City in Guangdong, China

Zhuhai 珠海市 Chuhai
- Prefecture-level city
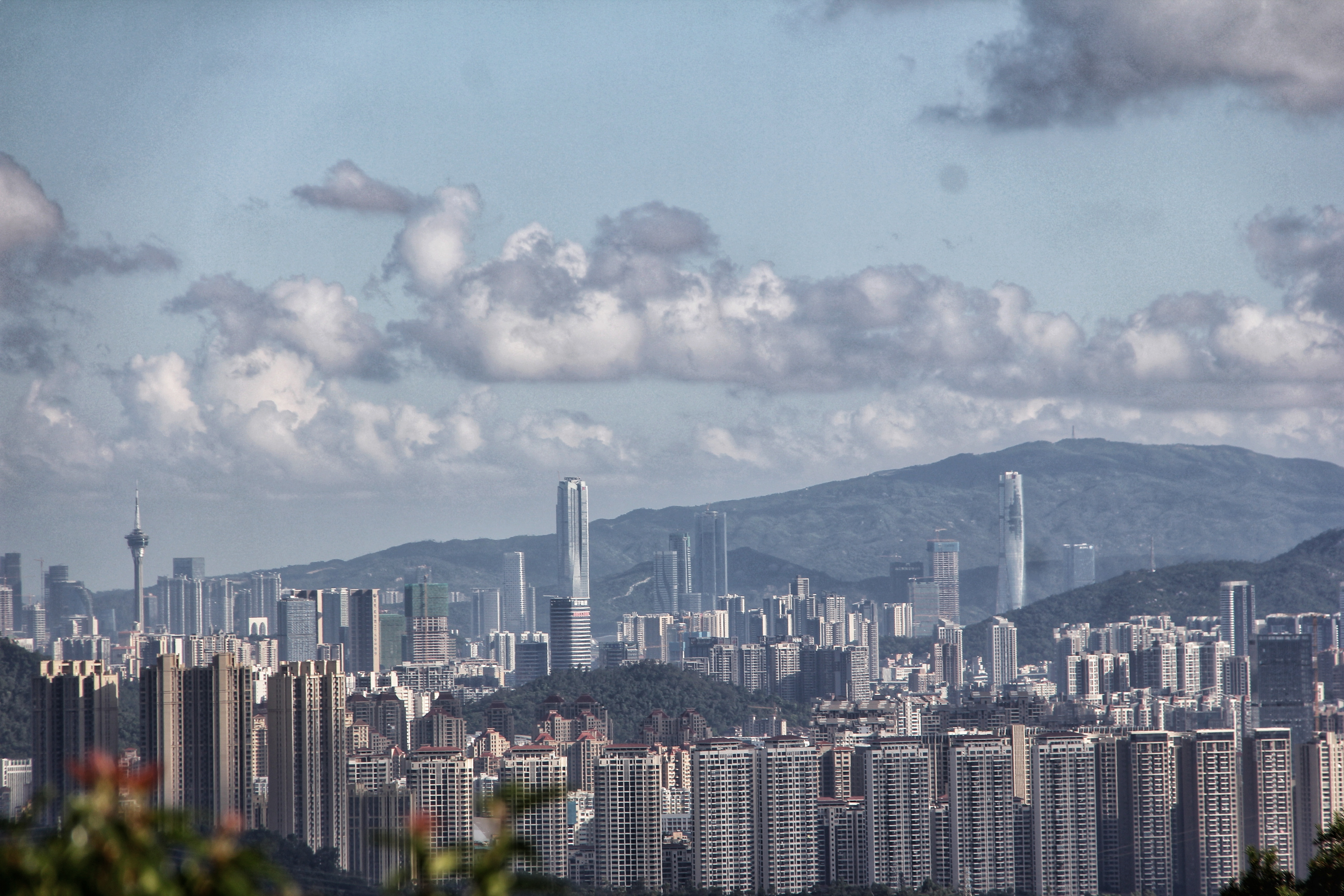
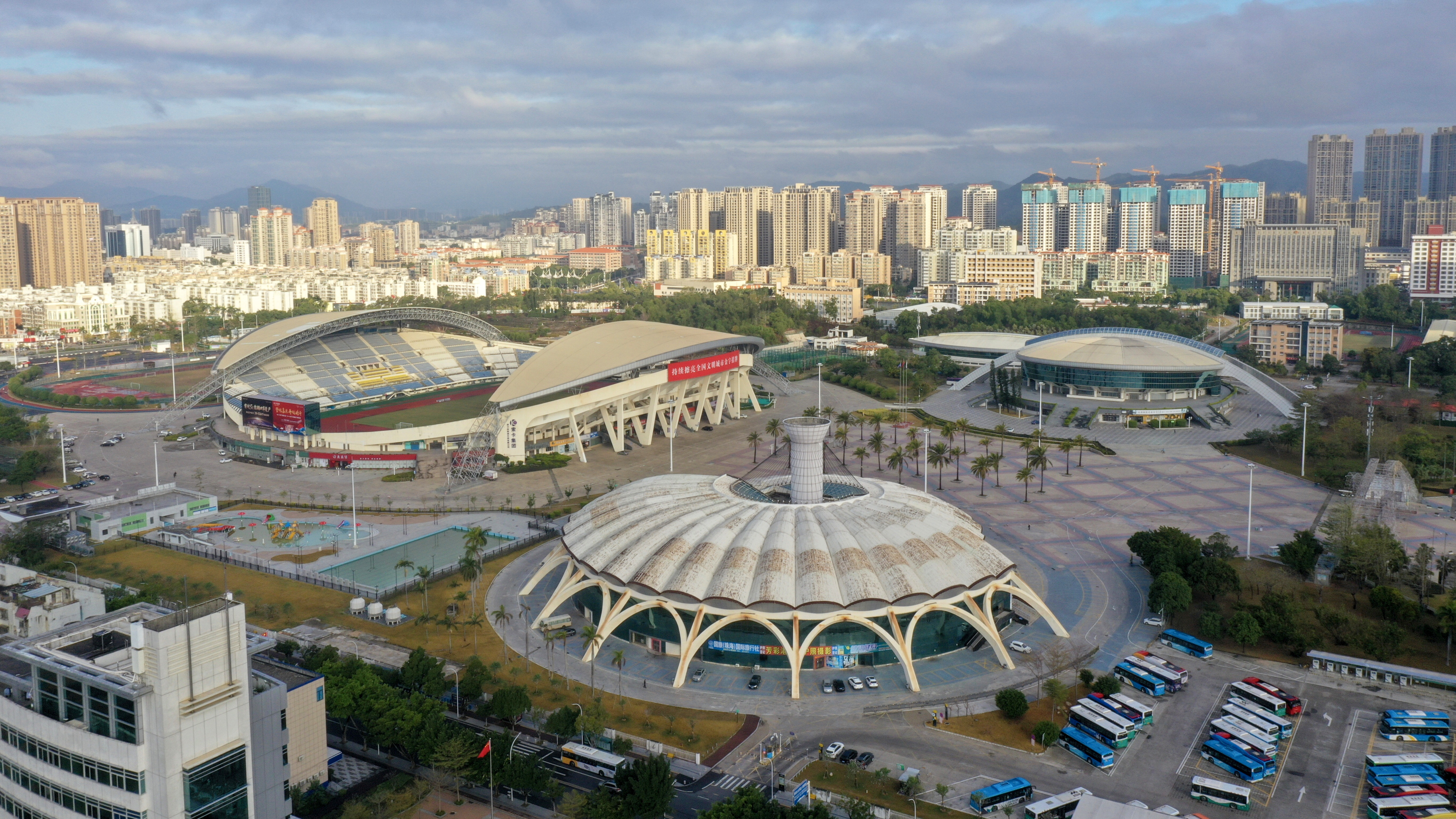
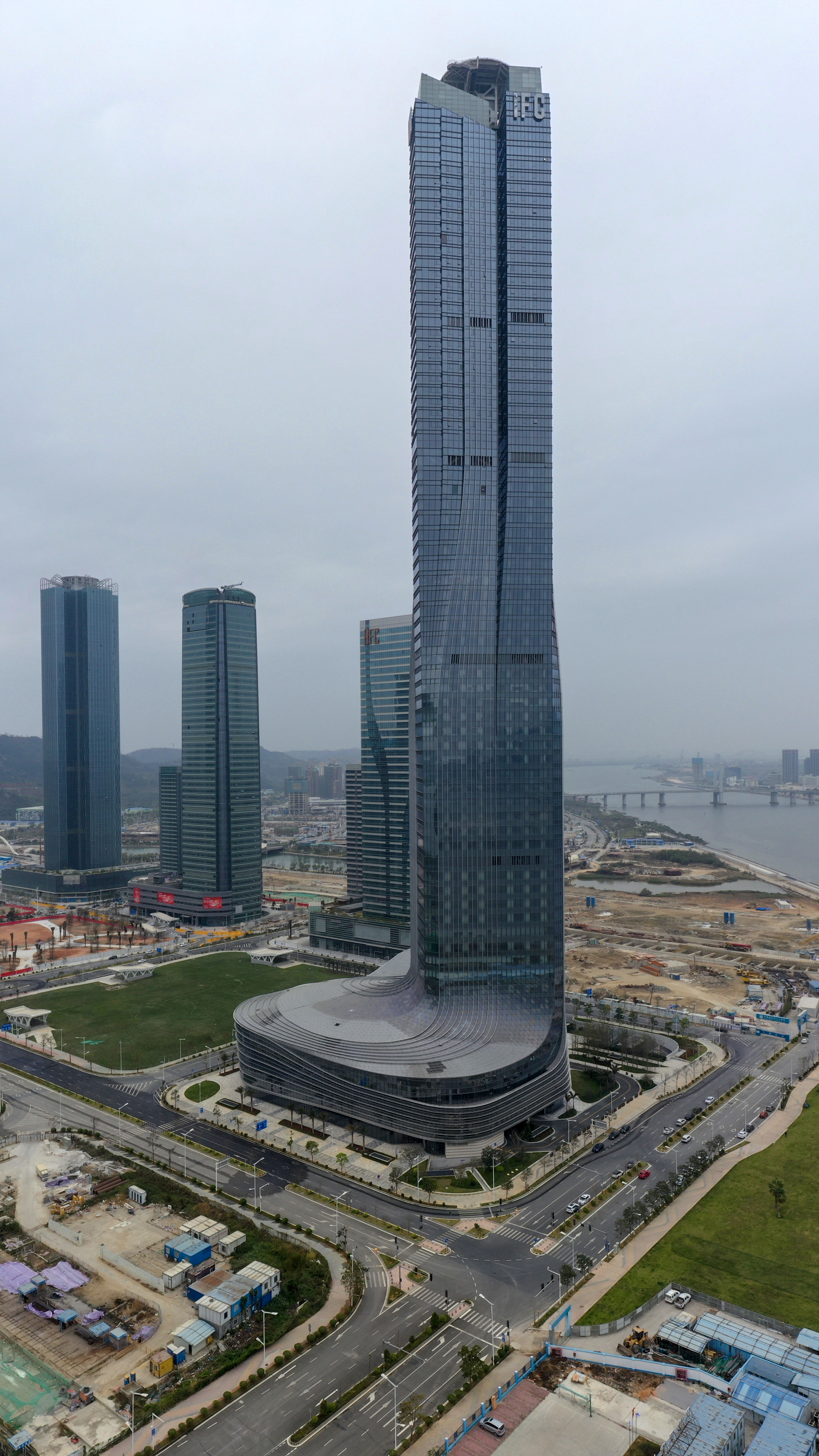
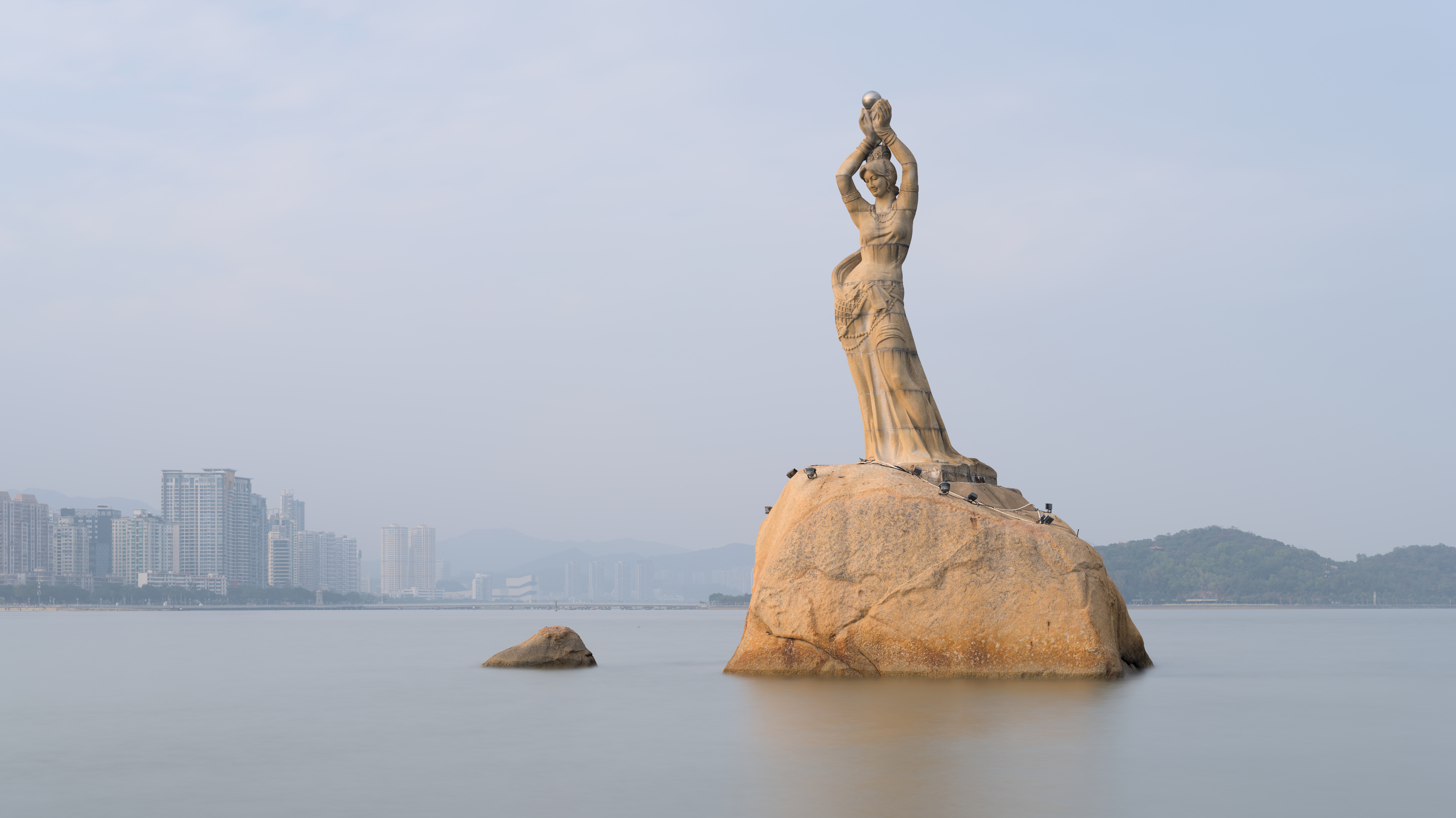
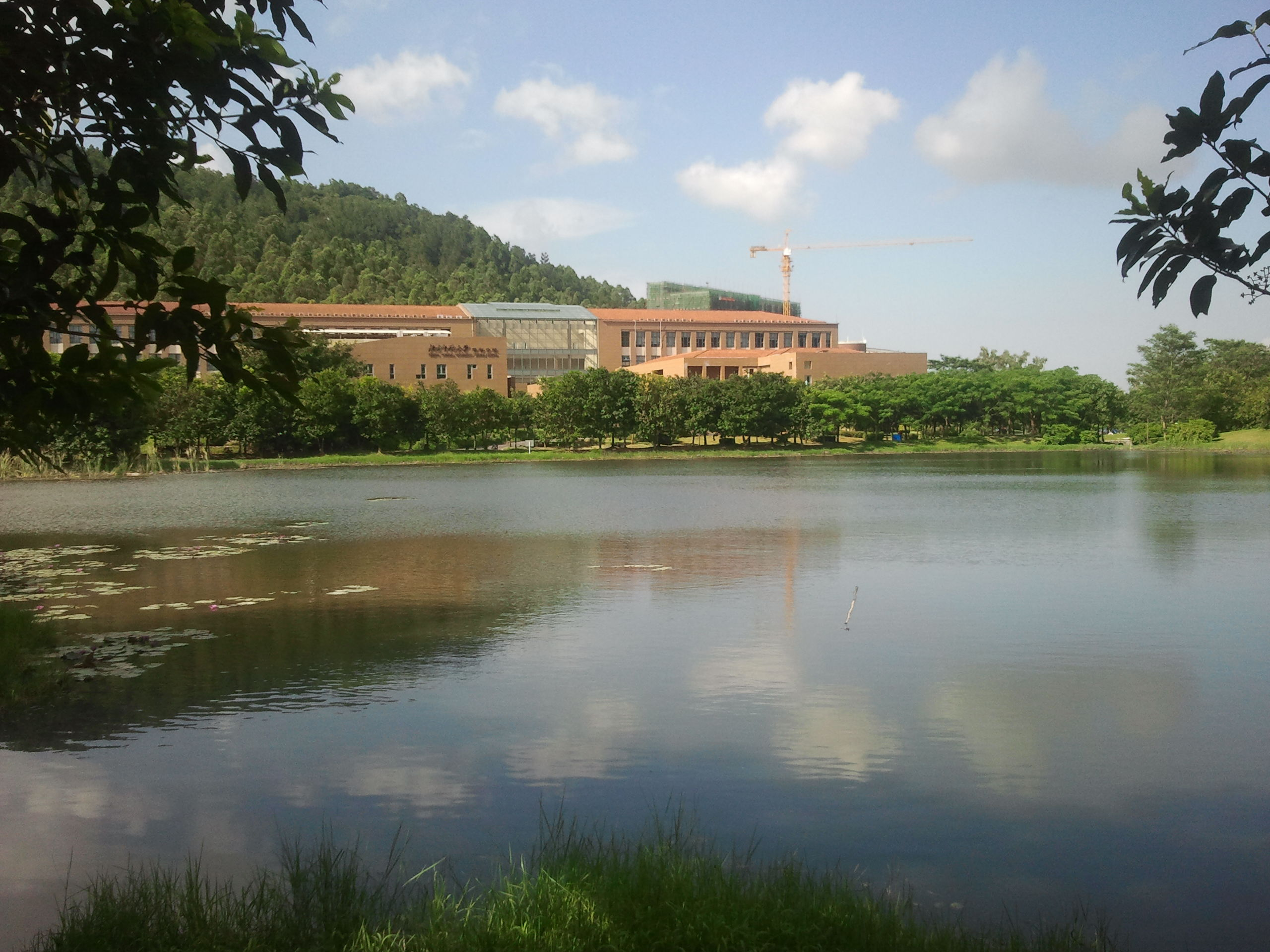
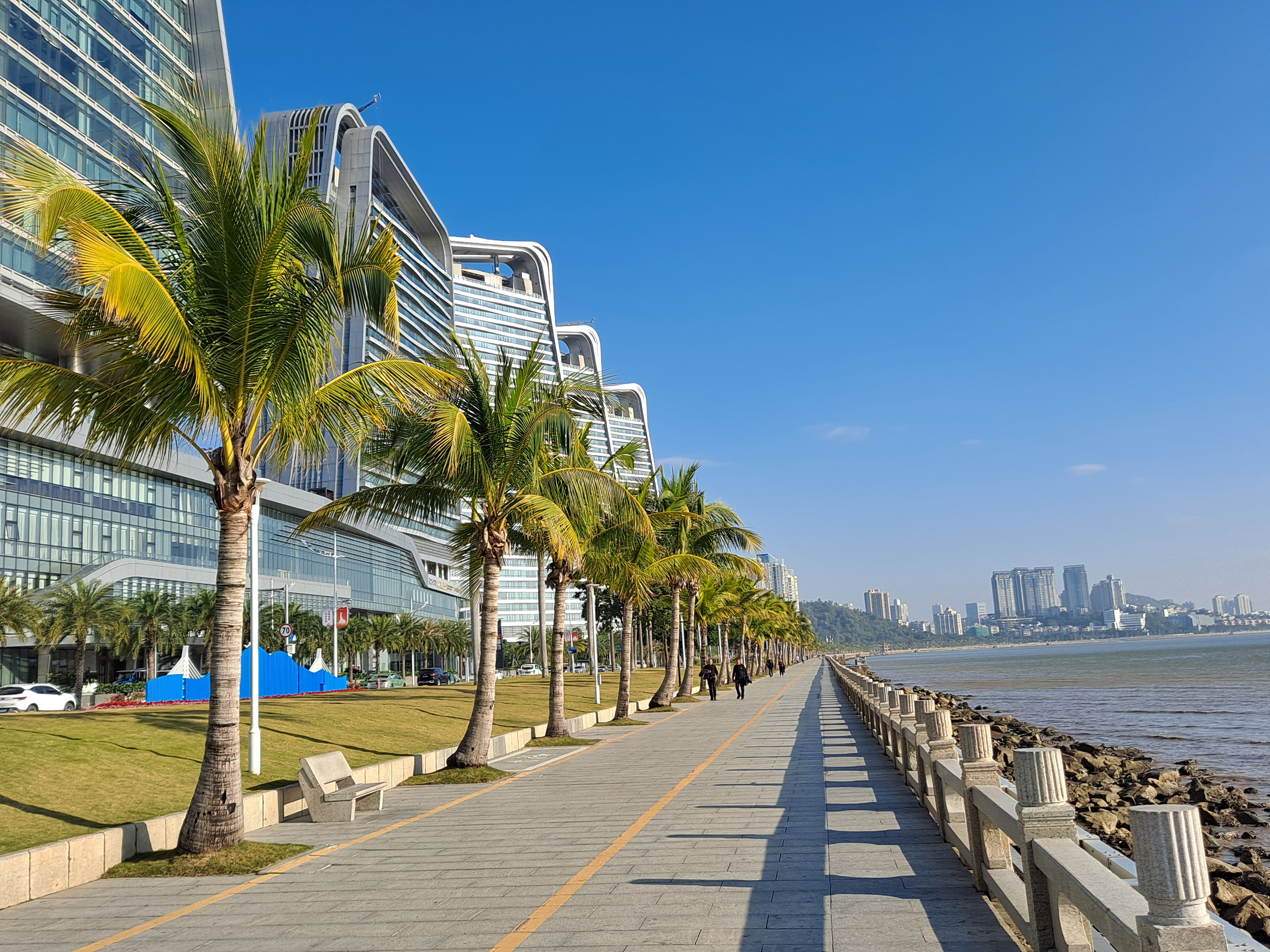
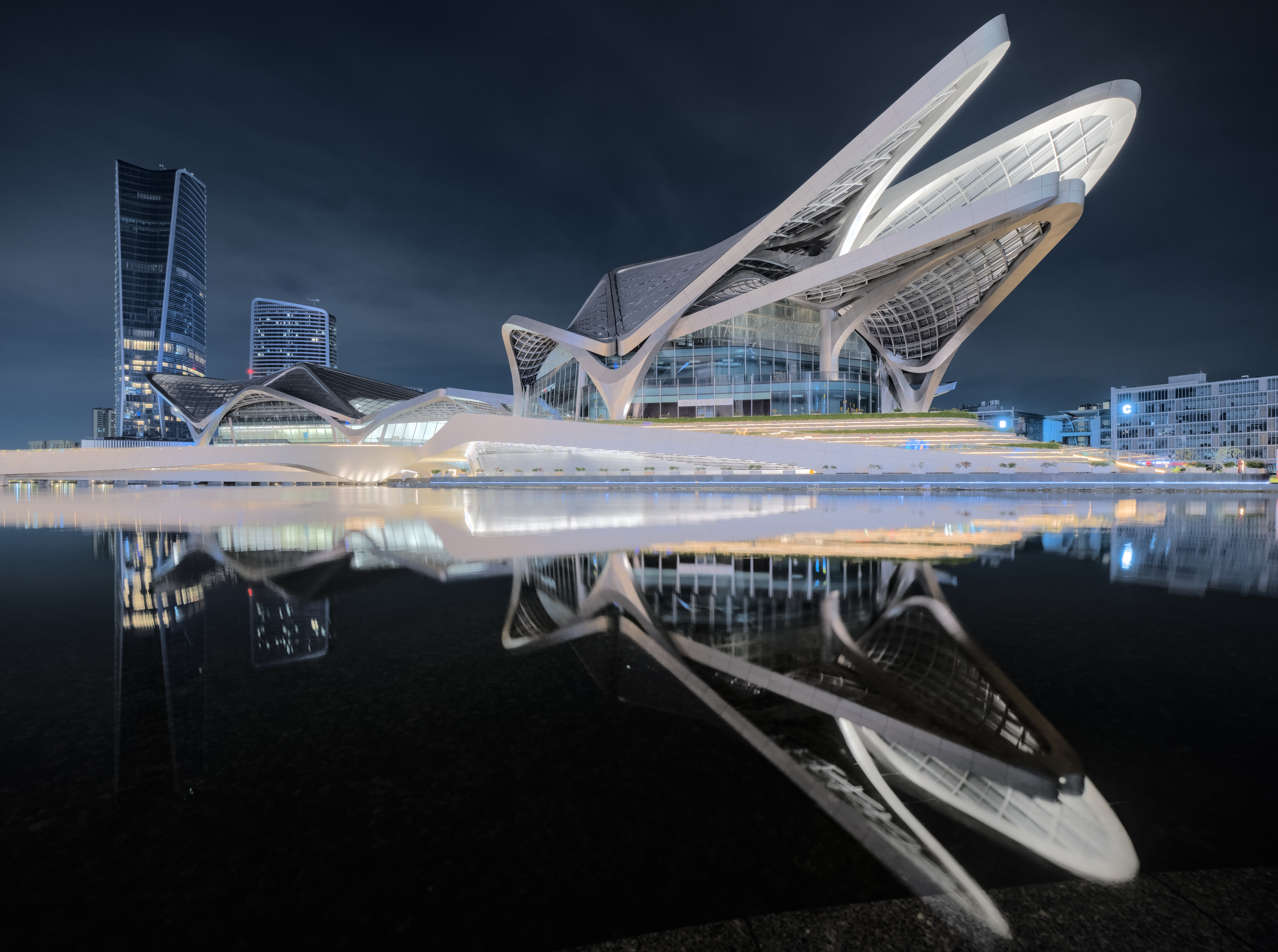
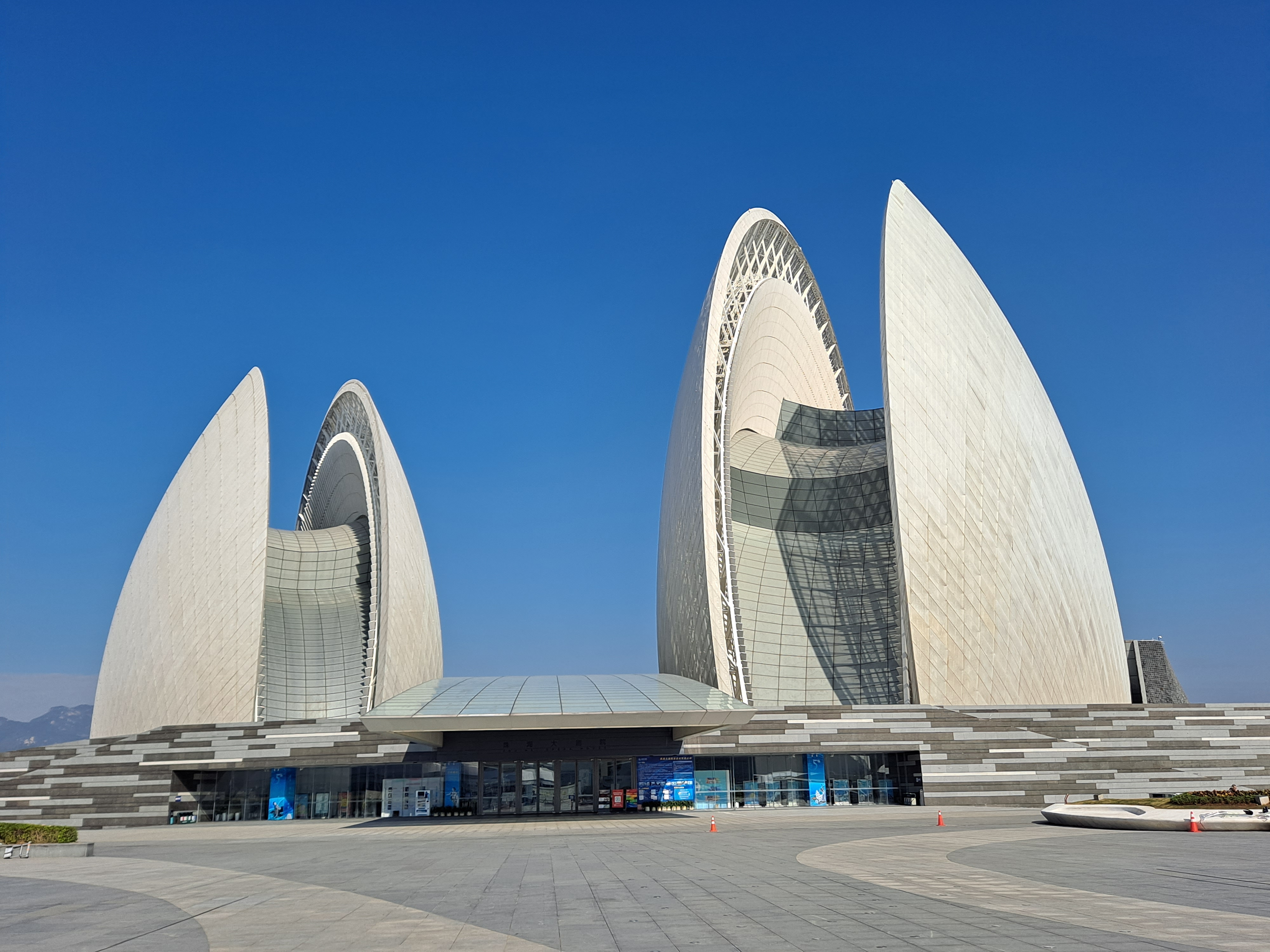
- Skyline of Zhuhai from Mount Phoenix Jintai Temple Zhuhai Stadium Hengqin island Zhuhai Fisher Girl Beijing Normal University Zhuhai Campus Lover's Road Jinwan Arts Center Zhuhai Grand Theater
- Nicknames: City of Romance (浪漫之城); City of hundred islands (百岛之城)
- Location of Zhuhai in Guangdong

- Location in China
- Coordinates: 22°16′27″N 113°34′19″E
- Country: People's Republic of China
- Province: Guangdong
- Municipal seat: Xiangzhou District

Government
  - Type: Prefecture-level city
  - Body: Zhuhai Municipal People's Congress
  - CCP Committee Secretary: Chen Yong (陈勇)
  - Mayor: Wu Zetong (吴泽桐) Acting

Area
  - Prefecture-level city: 1,724.32 km^{2} (665.76 sq mi)
  - Water: 690 km^{2} (270 sq mi)
  - Urban: 1,724.32 km^{2} (665.76 sq mi)
  - Metro: 19,870.4 km^{2} (7,672.0 sq mi)
- Elevation: 36 m (118 ft)

Population (2020 census)
  - Prefecture-level city: 2,439,585
  - Density: 1,414.81/km^{2} (3,664.34/sq mi)
  - Urban: 2,439,585
  - Urban density: 1,414.81/km^{2} (3,664.34/sq mi)
  - Metro: 65,565,622
  - Metro density: 3,299.66/km^{2} (8,546.09/sq mi)

GDP
  - Prefecture-level city: CN¥ 388.2 billion US$60.2 billion
  - Per capita: CN¥157,914; US$24,477
- Time zone: UTC+8 (China Standard Time)
- Postal code: 519000
- Area code: 0756
- ISO 3166 code: CN-GD-04
- License plate prefixes: 粤C
- Website: zhuhai.gov.cn (in Chinese)

Zhuhai
- "Zhuhai" in Chinese
- Chinese: 珠海
- Cantonese Yale: Jyū-hói
- Postal: Chuhai
- Literal meaning: "Pearl Sea"
Transcriptions
Standard Mandarin
- Hanyu Pinyin: Zhūhǎi
- Bopomofo: ㄓㄨ ㄏㄞˇ
- Wade–Giles: Chu^{1}-hai^{3}
- IPA: [ʈʂú.xàɪ]
Hakka
- Romanization: Zu^{1}-hoi^{3}
Yue: Cantonese
- Yale Romanization: Jyū-hói
- Jyutping: Zyu1 hoi2
- IPA: [tsy˥hɔj˧˥]

Zhuhai (Note: /ˈdʒuːhaɪ/ JOO-hye; Chinese: 珠海; pinyin: Zhūhǎi; Yale: Jyūhói; also known as Chuhai) is a resort city located on the west bank of the Pearl River estuary, near Macau on the east shore of Zhongshan Island, of the central coast of southern Guangdong, China, on the southeastern edge of the Pearl River Delta. Its name literally means "pearl sea", which originates from the city's location at the mouth of the Pearl River meeting the South China Sea. Zhuhai borders Jiangmen to the west, Zhongshan to the north and Macau to the southeast, and has a bridge connecting to Hong Kong.

Zhuhai was one of the original four special economic zones established in 1980, as well as one of China's premier tourist destinations, being called the Chinese Riviera. While the city is located in the traditionally Cantonese-speaking province of Guangdong, a significant portion of the population is now made up of Mandarin-speaking economic migrants originally from inland provinces.

The core of Zhuhai, Xiangzhou District along with Macao are in the northeastern portion of the administrative division and are part of the Guangdong-Hong Kong-Macau Greater Bay Area, the biggest built-up area in the world with more than 65,565,622 inhabitants as of the 2020 census, encompassing Shenzhen, Dongguan, Foshan, Zhongshan, Macau, the main part of Guangzhou, and small parts of Jiangmen and Huizhou cities but with Hong Kong not quite conurbated yet.

According to a report released in 2014 by the Chinese Academy of Social Sciences, Zhuhai is the most liveable city in China. Zhuhai is classified as a Medium-Port Metropolis.

== History ==
=== Prehistoric era through Bronze age ===
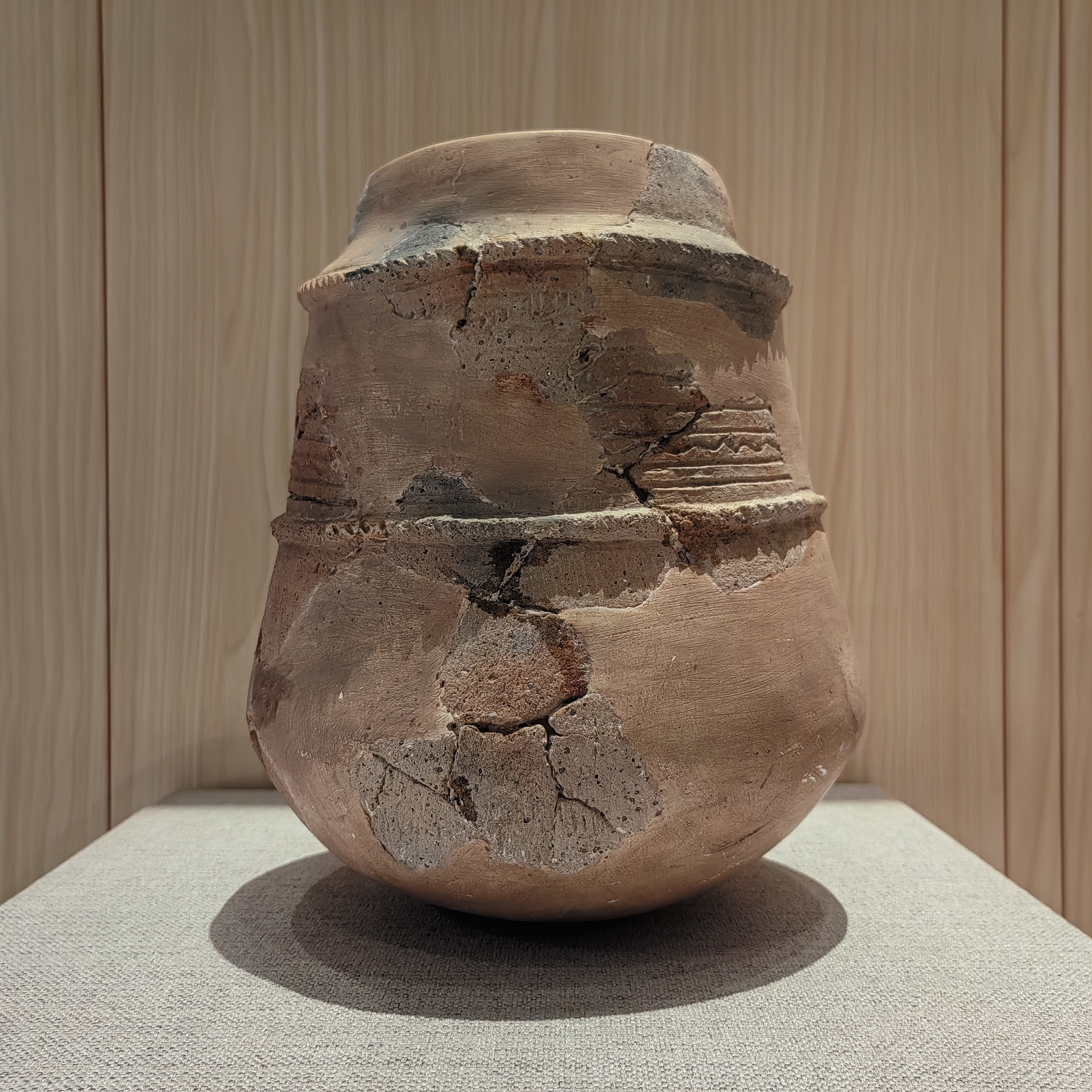
Reconstructed Neolithic pottery discovered at Baojingwan, now featured at the Zhuhai Museum

Archeological evidence suggests human inhabitation in the Zhuhai region from at least the Neolithic Age. Numerous sites, including Baojingwan on Gaolan Island and Houshawan on Qi'ao Island, have yielded artifacts including pottery, rings, tools, and discs made of stone and jade that date between the Late Neolithic and Bronze Ages. Baojingwan also contains petroglyphs and paintings from the Late Neolithic period. Zhuhai's prehistoric cultures demonstrate similarities with others discovered in the Pearl River Delta, and indicate the presence of maritime, hunter-gatherer, and agricultural societies. Sites such as Tangxiahua have also revealed bronze casts, indicating the existence of regional bronze manufacturing that was contemporary with the Shang and Western Zhou dynasties.

=== Imperial China ===
==== Qin through Yuan ====
After the Qin dynasty's conquering of the indigenous Baiyue in 214 BCE, present-day Zhuhai was incorporated into Panyu County within the larger Nanhai Commandery. Following the Qin's collapse, Zhuhai was part of the Nanyue kingdom until its defeat by the Han in 111 BCE. Sustained migration of Han Chinese into the Zhuhai region began during the Eastern Jin dynasty (317–420). One notable instance was after Sun En's failed rebellion was driven out of Guangzhou; Sun's forces escaped to the Wanshan Archipelago, and their descendants eventually settled on the islands among remaining Baiyue and established fishing communities.

By the Tang dynasty (618-907), sedimentation from the region's watershed formed alluvial plains between islands and gradually expanded Zhuhai's shoreline; its first significant settlement, Xiangshan, was established as a military outpost in 757. Located in present-day Shanchang, Xiangshan assisted in countering piracy along the Maritime Silk Road and eventually developed into a center of salt production. Other regional industries in this period and in the subsequent Song dynasty (960–1279) were silver mining, fishing, and agriculture. Increased migration from Northern China and Xiangshan's productive capacity eventually convinced the imperial court to establish Xiangshan County in 1152 by incorporating land from Dongguang, Nanhai, Panyu, and Xinhui.

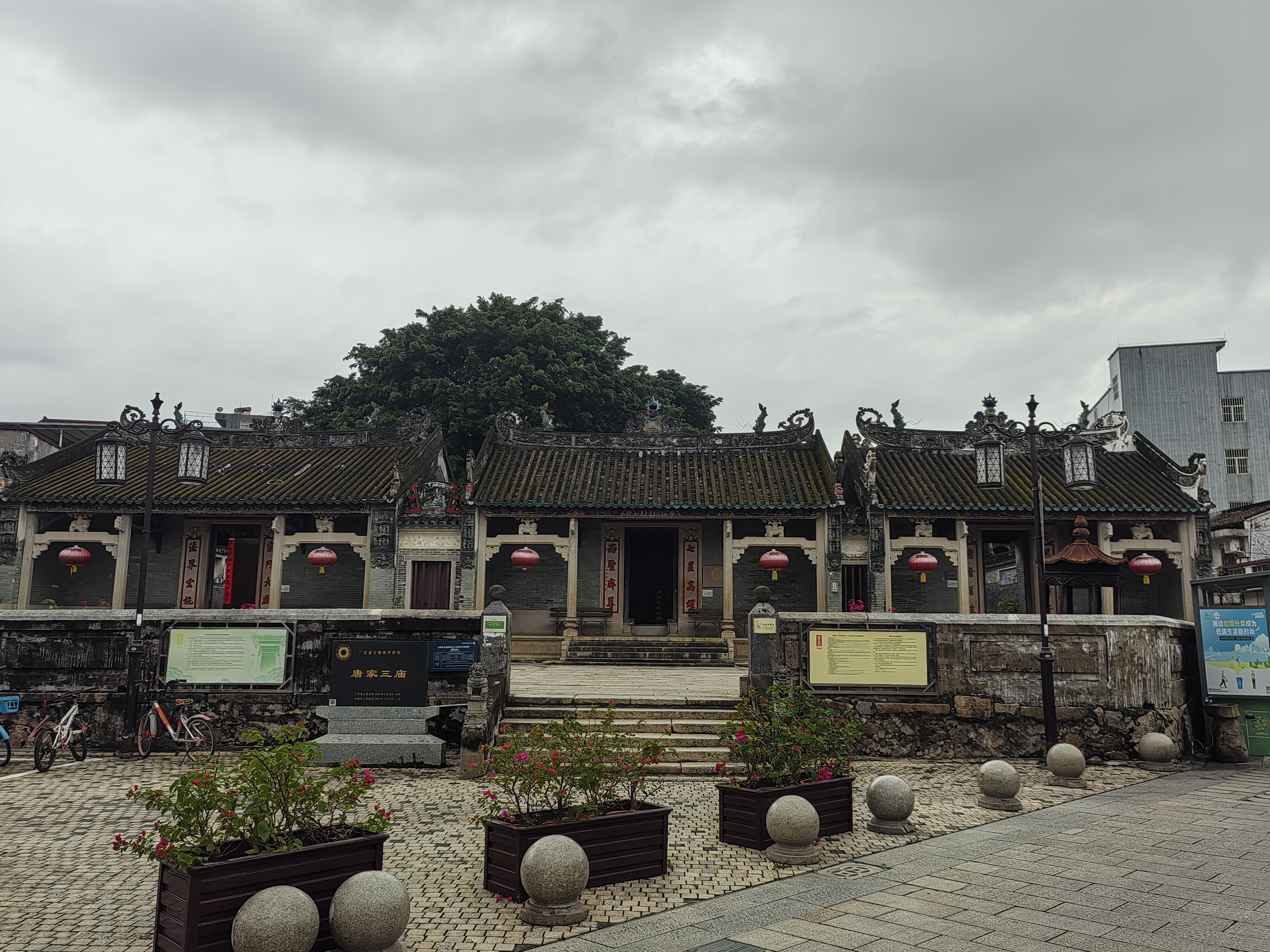
Ancestral halls of the Tang family in Tangjiawan, originally constructed during the Song, Yuan, and Ming Dynasties. The existing buildings date from 1863

Further migration into Zhuhai was prompted by the Jin–Song wars and other upheavals during the Song Dynasty. Zhuhai's prominent local clans, including the Tangs, Zhangs, Yangs, Rongs, and Wus, originated in these waves of migrations; 24 clans had been established in Xiangshan by the Southern Song. Clans brought more effective agricultural practices to Zhuhai and developed it further through land reclamation efforts.

During their retreat from encroaching Yuan forces, the Song imperial court passed through several settlements in Zhuhai, with Hengqin being the location of a battle against the Yuan led by Zhang Shijie. The Battle of Yamen, the Song's last stand against the Yuan, took place near the west coast of present-day Doumen. Zhang Shijie later drowned in the South China Sea, and his body was buried by villagers at the foot of Huangyang Mountain in Doumen. Surviving members of the Song then settled in Xiangshan and were strictly overseen and persecuted by the Yuan government; some lived around Huangyang Mountain and established a hermitage that eventually became Jintai Temple in 1740.

==== Ming through emergence of Macau ====
Raids by wokou pirates along China's coasts during the early Ming dynasty (1368–1644) instigated the construction of fortifications in Zhuhai, including on Sanzao Island and Jinding. By the reign of the Jiajing Emperor (1521–1567), the imperial government instituted the Haijin policy, which banned maritime trade throughout Guangdong and other provinces with the intent of countering piracy. Problems with piracy continued to intensify and clandestine trade with foreign merchants persisted in the Zhuhai region. Despite the trade bans, Guangdong governor Lin Fu persuaded the Ming government to open a port at Lampacau in present-day Nanshui in 1529, which between 1553 and 1557 was a center of trade with the Portuguese. Trade officials were eventually moved from Lampacau to Haojing in 1535, which was less remote and considered more favorable for trade.

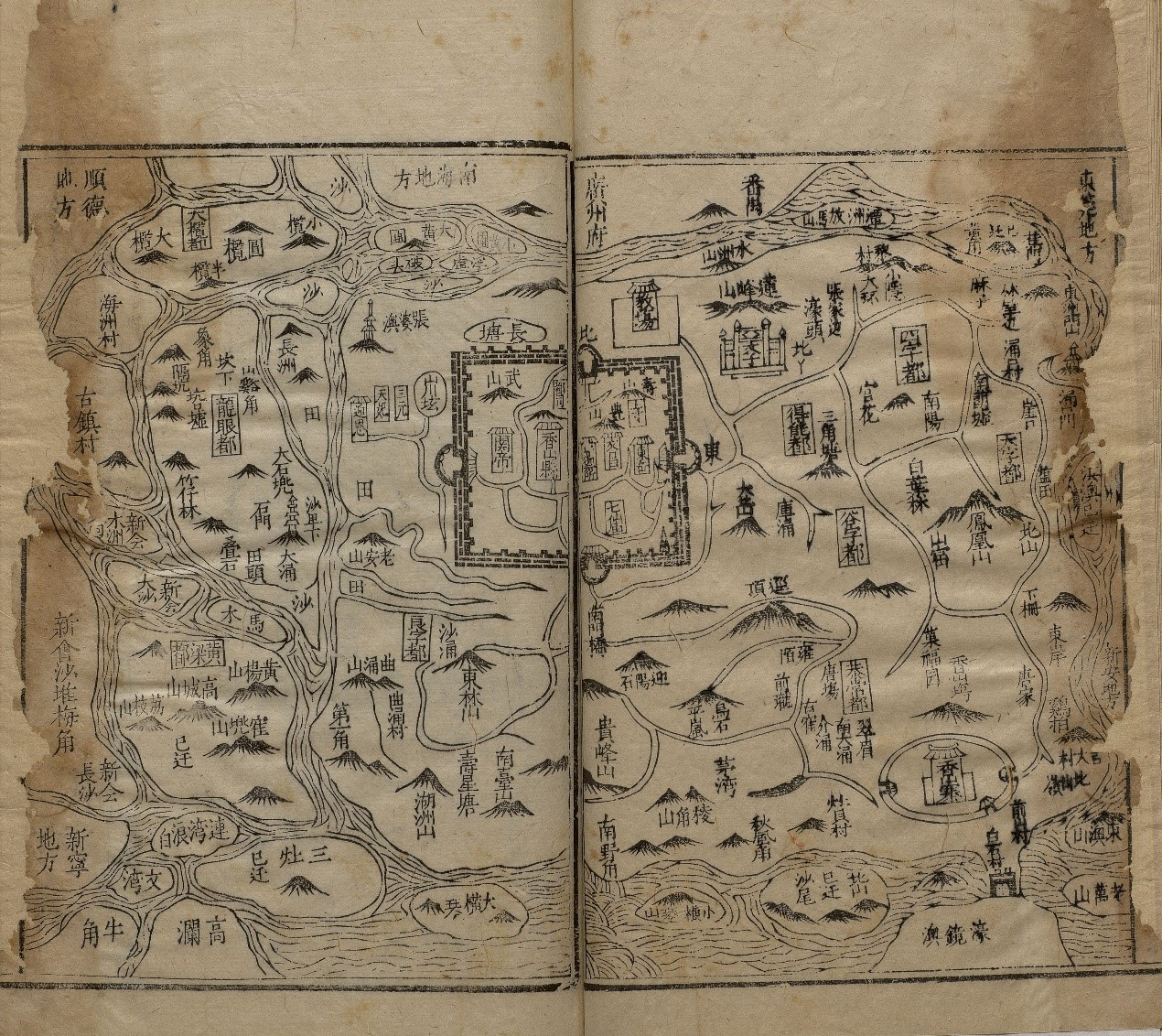
1673 map of Xiangshan County. Present-day Zhuhai and Macau are positioned on the lower right. Xiangshan town and the Macau border gate are visible

Portuguese merchants first arrived in Haojing in 1553 after allegedly bribing the port's chief official Wang Bo to allow for the drying of their cargo and establishment of trade operations; increased Portuguese migration to Haojing led to its development into Macau. As Macau grew, the Ming government built fortifications in Zhuhai to prevent further encroachment by Portugal, including a border checkpoint at Gongbei in 1574 and a military garrison at Qianshan in 1621.

Following the collapse of the Ming, the Qing dynasty enforced the Great Clearance along China's coastal provinces between 1656 and 1684 to counter Ming loyalists that operated out of Taiwan. Xiangshan County and all surrounding municipalities were subsequently evacuated, with anyone resisting facing death. Residents in Zhuhai reluctant to leave their homes hid in Hengqin, Sanzao, Gaolan, and elsewhere; they were infamously lured out by the Qing army in 1664 to Huangshan mountain in Doumen and killed en mass. Piracy and banditry also worsened in Zhuhai during the chaos of the transition to the Qing, and its islands and villages were subject to violent raids. Many of Zhuhai's original inhabitants did not return after the clearance policy ended in 1684, and the area became populated with migrants from other regions in Guangdong. Settlements in Zhuhai then proliferated into the 18th century as the economy recovered from the clearance; many of Zhuhai's present-day villages originate from this period.

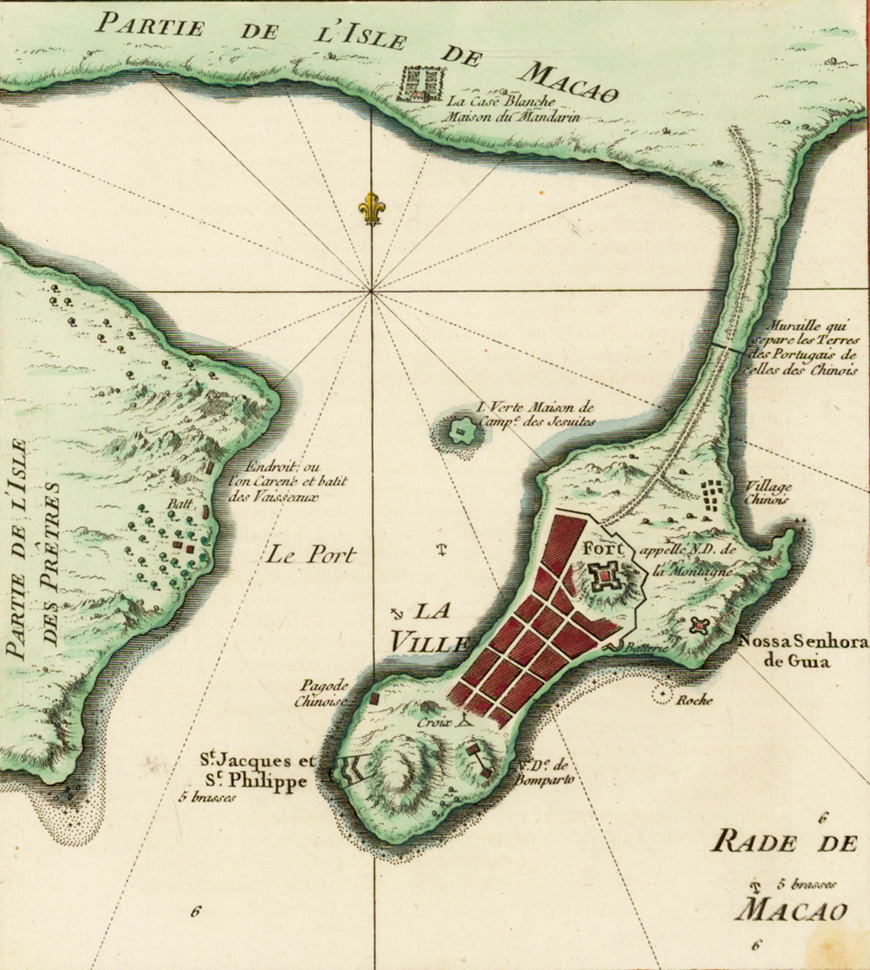
1757 map of Macau and the Qianshan garrison ("La Casa Blanche")

To emphasize their sovereignty over Macau, the Qing government implemented a local governance structure in 1731 at Qianshan to manage Chinese and Portuguese affairs, which was eventually moved to Mong Ha in 1743. A further layer of authority, the Macau Coast Military and Civilian Government, was added in 1744 and governed Xiangshan as well as other nearby counties; this organization's chief official was based out of the Qianshan fort until 1910.

==== Late Qing ====
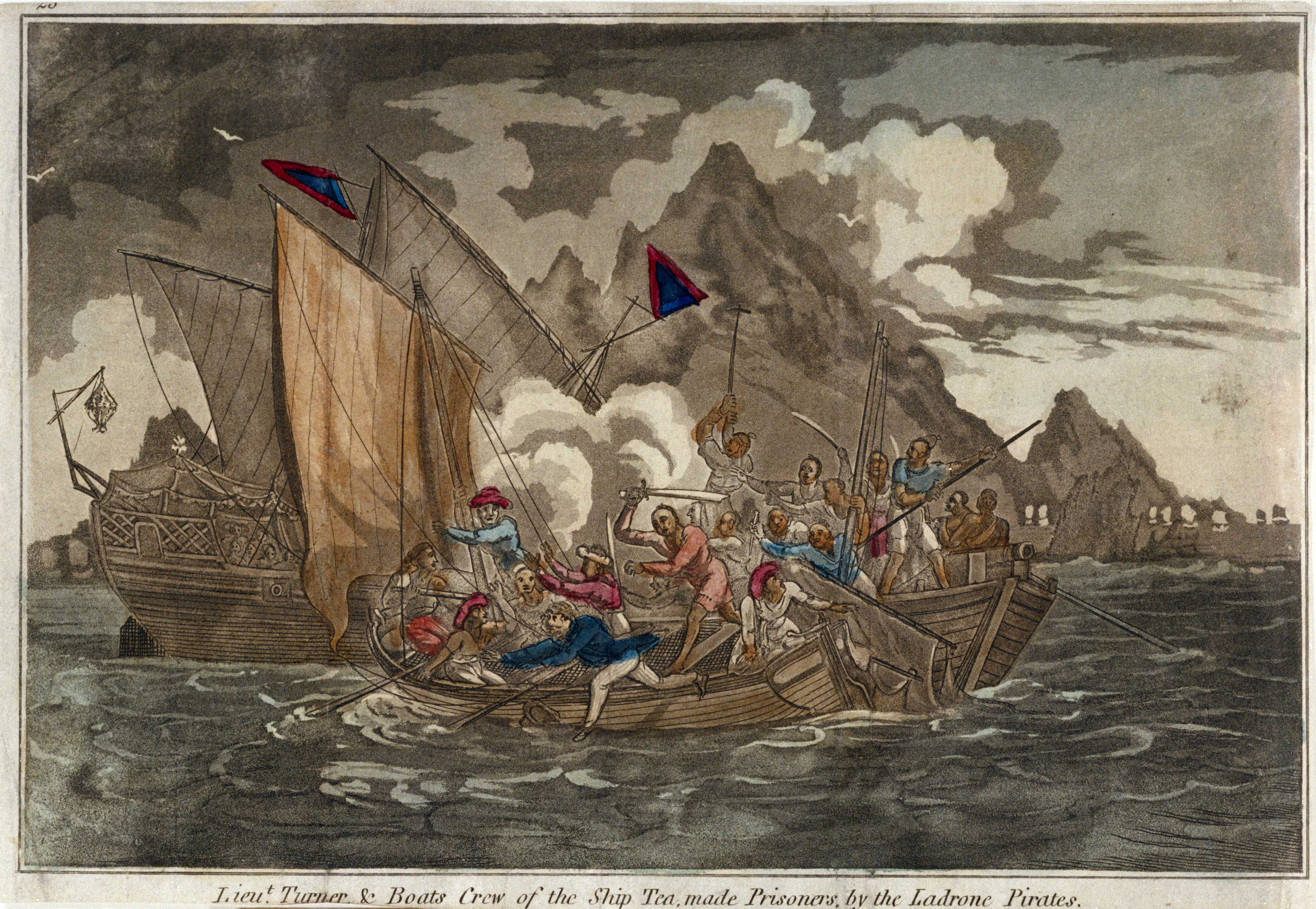
British Lieutenant John Turner and the crew of the ship Tay being attacked by pirates from Wanshan on December 7, 1806

Beginning in the 18th century, the opium trade arose in Zhuhai and the broader Pearl River Delta. British merchants originally stored opium at Yunque Bay to the south of Macau before moving their operations to Lintin Island following the Qing bans on the trade. Illicit opium trafficking then continued between Western and Chinese smugglers in the waters around Cumsingmoon.

The Pearl River Delta's piracy problem also reemerged beginning in the 1780s, initially with support from the Vietnamese Tây Sơn dynasty that the Qing unsuccessfully fought during their invasion of Đại Việt in 1788. Primarily targeting foreign and Chinese merchant vessels, including those trading in opium, the region's pirates numbered in the tens of thousands by 1805, and had bases throughout the Delta; those in Zhuhai included anchorages at Gaolan, Sanjiao, and Zhuzhou Islands. Cheung Po Tsai, considered one of the most formidable pirates of the period, raided several areas in Xiangshan in August 1809. After repeated failures at combating the region's piracy, the Qing began offering amnesty to pirate leaders in exchange for military postings and monetary rewards; this, along with infighting among pirate gangs, significantly reduced pirate activity by 1810.

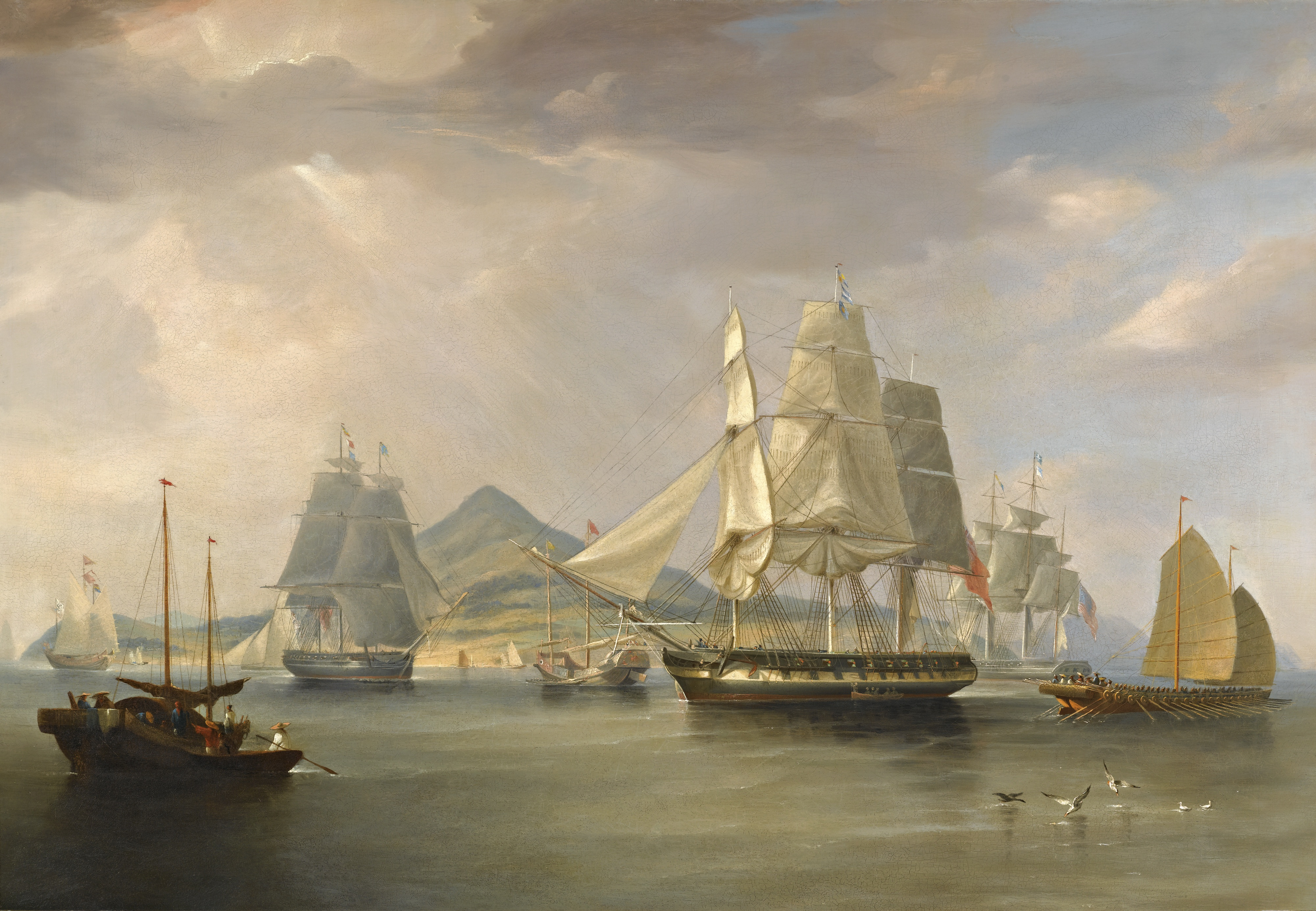
Opium ships at Lintin, William John Huggins (1824)

In the prelude to the First Opium War, villagers on Qi'ao Island, an opium depot in northwestern Zhuhai, skirmished with British and American opium traffickers on July 1, 1836 and successfully pushed them out. After the war broke out in 1839, the British Army instigated the Battle of the Barrier at the Macau-Xiangshan border wall at Gongbei on August 19, 1840; the British force's superior firepower resulted in a Qing defeat. The Qing's loss of the war in 1842 and subsequent signing of unequal treaties with a series of Western countries motivated the Portuguese to assert greater authority over Macau; this led to the Passaleão incident in August 1849, when Portuguese troops successfully occupied the Qing's fort Baishaling at Gongbei after the assassination of Macau Governor João Maria Ferreira do Amaral. Further Portuguese encroachments into Xiangshan resulted in the Qing government signing the Sino-Portuguese Treaty of Peking in 1887, which officially recognized Portugal's sovereignty over Macau. Border disputes in Zhuhai between Macau and the Qing government continued into the early 20th century; some villages organized local militias to resist Portuguese expansionism. Beyond conflicts with foreign powers, Zhuhai was also impacted by the Red Turban Rebellion led by the Hongmen society in the 1850s, with areas like Doumen serving as bases of activity for the rebels.

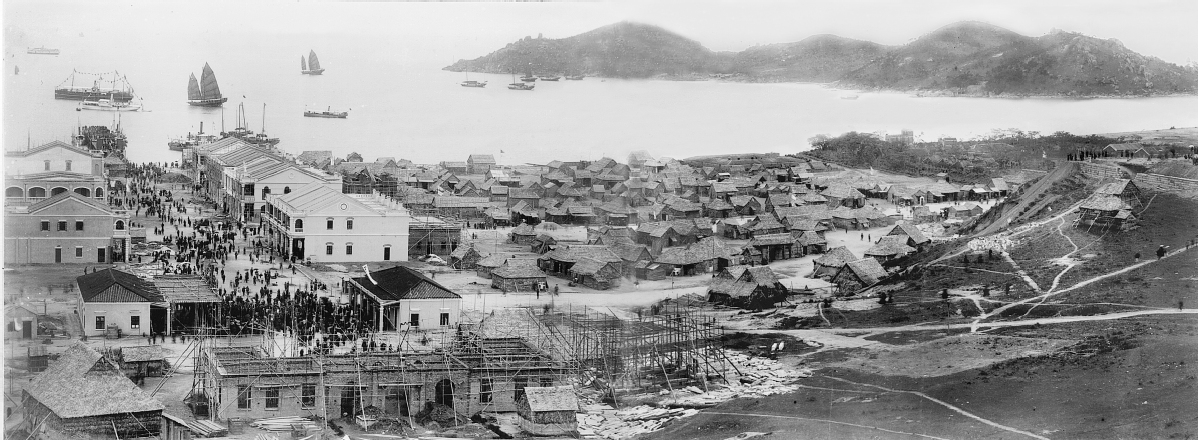
Panoramic view of Xiangzhou, c. 1910

Throughout the 19th century, many of Zhuhai's residents migrated abroad in pursuit of economic opportunity; others were trafficked as a part of Macau's coolie trade that boomed after the First Opium War. Some became successful businessmen and reinvested their earnings into their hometowns. These included Wu Yuzheng and Wang Xi, who along with others in Xiangshan worked to establish Xiangzhou in 1908 as a tax-exempt port and commercial center. Xiangzhou's prosperity was short-lived, and it was eventually deserted due to lack of government support and investment, competition from Macau, and a devastating fire in 1911. Remittances also emerged as an important source of income for locals as migration increased.

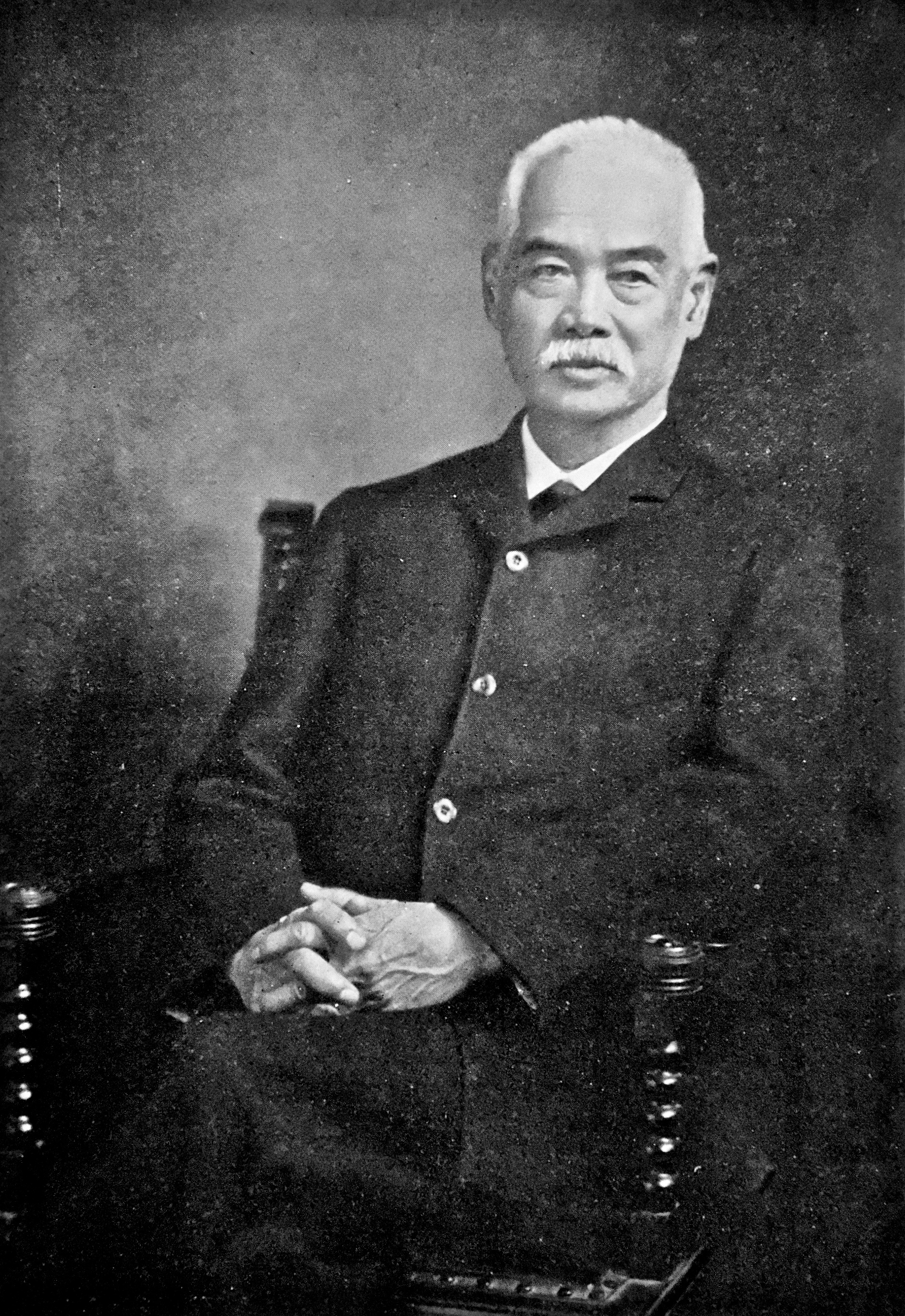
1909 portrait of Yung Wing. Yung was originally educated at the Morrison Education Society School in Macau before migrating to the United States, where he graduated from Yale College in 1854.

Zhuhai's proximity to Macau and Hong Kong enabled greater exposure to Western ideas and education among its residents; many went on to become prominent intellectuals, reformers, and revolutionaries. This was exemplified in the life of Yung Wing, a native of Zhuhai who was the first Chinese graduate of an American college, founder of the Chinese Educational Mission, and ardent supporter of reform during the late Qing and early Republican periods. Others included Yang Pao'an, a Marxist activist and early member of the Chinese Communist Party (CCP) who helped facilitate the First United Front between the Kuomintang (KMT) and the CCP, and Su Zhaozheng, a labor organizer and CCP member who led the 1922 seamen's strike and 1925 Canton–Hong Kong strike. The Zhuhai area was also a major source of compradors that worked with Western firms in Guangzhou, Shanghai, and other ports throughout China with significant international trade; notable figures from this group hailing from Zhuhai included Tong King-Sing.

=== Republican period through Sino-Japanese war ===
==== Early Republican era and establishment of Zhongshan County ====
Qing rule ended in Xiangshan on November 6, 1911 during the Xinhai Revolution. Banditry and piracy was rife throughout Zhuhai's villages and islands in the subsequent Warlord Era. The Portuguese made numerous attempts to take advantage of early Republican China's instability and expand Macau's territory further into Zhuhai, leading to violent border disputes. Tensions between Macau and the Nationalist government reached a head following the May 29th Incident in 1922; Chinese forces were stationed at Qianshan and the waters surrounding Macau until the crisis subsided after Chen Jiongming's coup against Sun Yat-sen on June 15. During the 1925 Canton–Hong Kong strike, merchants and farmers in Zhuhai assisted in blockading Macau at Qianshan between June 1925 and October 1926.

Under the First United Front between the KMT and CCP, the Central Committee of the Kuomintang ordered the Peasant's Department and its associated Peasant Movement Training Institute in 1924 to cultivate the peasant movement against landlords in Xiangshan. Peasant associations, which consisted of grassroots militias and governing organizations, were first formed in Zhuhai at Shangzha in December 1925. This coincided with Ye Jianying's establishment of a National Revolutionary Army (NRA) regiment in Xiangzhou under orders from Sun Yat-sen and Liao Zhongkai; per Liao's instructions, part of the regiment assisted in the growth of the area's peasant movement. In reaction to the peasant movement, local landlords and right-wing members of the NRA staged a violent mutiny against suspected left-wing members of the Xiangzhou regiment on April 26, 1925, resulting in the death of 27 officers and soldiers. Ye successfully quelled the mutiny on April 27 and built a memorial cemetery for the soldiers that died during the revolt; it is known today as the Xiangzhou Martyr's Cemetery and has been designated a protected landmark. Following the Shanghai massacre of CCP members in April 1927, forces allied with the KMT's right wing successfully suppressed Zhuhai's peasant organizations by executing or imprisoning its leaders and militiamen.

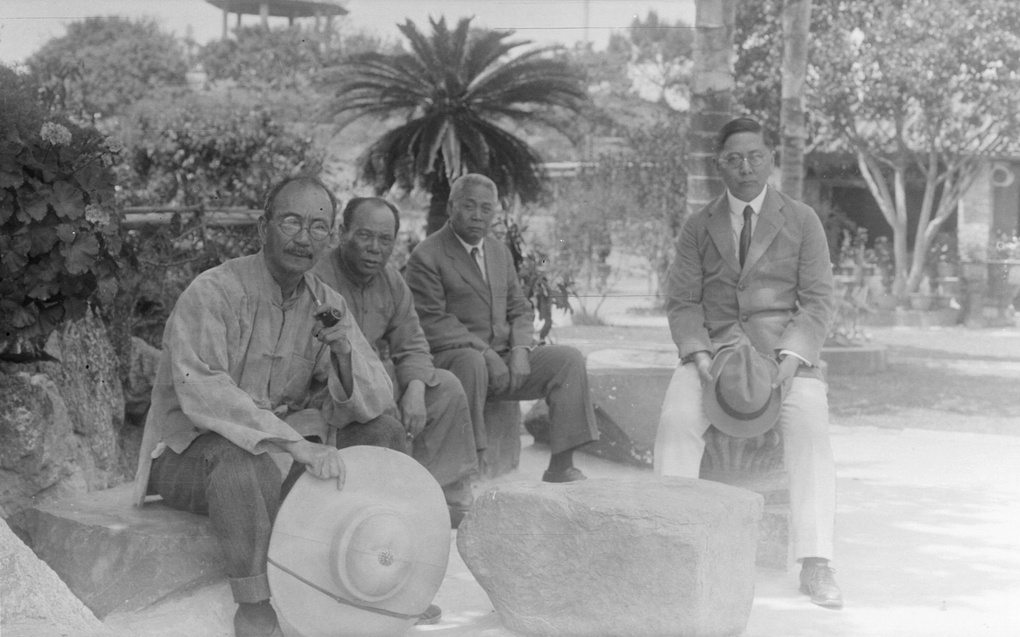
Undated photograph by Foo Ping-sheung of Tang Shaoyi, Sun Fo, and two others at present-day Gongle Garden

After Sun Yat-sen passed away in 1925, Xiangshan County was renamed to Zhongshan in his honor. In 1929, Zhongshan was designated by the Nationalist government as a "model county" within their larger modernization efforts during the Nanjing decade, entitling Zhongshan to state support via tax exemptions and financial assistance. Modernization initiatives under magistrates Tang Shaoyi between 1930 and 1934 and Yang Ziyi between 1935 and 1937 resulted in the completion of multiple infrastructure projects and the reform of public services, including law enforcement and public health programs per the prescriptions of the New Life Movement. These plans originally proposed the development of Tangjiawan, Zhongshan's seat of government between 1930 and 1934, into a commercial port that would compete with Hong Kong; they were ultimately aborted due to prohibitive costs and insufficient support from the central government. Political instability, including that instigated by warlord Chen Jitang during his consolidation of power in Guangdong, further disrupted Tangjiawan's development. Several sites in Zhuhai from this period, including Gongle Garden on Tang's former estate, have been retained and preserved.

==== Japanese invasion and occupation ====
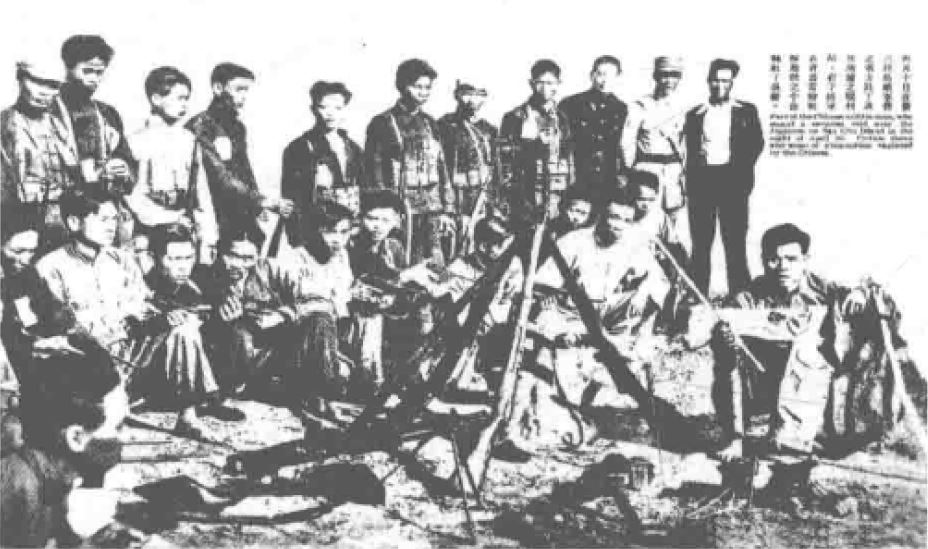
Image of Chinese troops after a successful raid on Japan's Sanzao position in April 1938

Japanese forces established a presence in Zhuhai from the beginning of the Second Sino-Japanese War in July 1937, docking warships from the 5th Fleet along the coast and launching air raids throughout the region. Chinese soldiers and civilian militias successfully resisted several Japanese incursions. The Imperial Japanese Army then ordered the construction of an airbase at Sanzao Island on December 3, 1938, which they occupied from February following a brief withdrawal. Forces from the 4th Fleet docked at Sanzao on December 5 and began building docks and cabins; 30 islanders that refused to work on the structures were executed, and local women were raped.

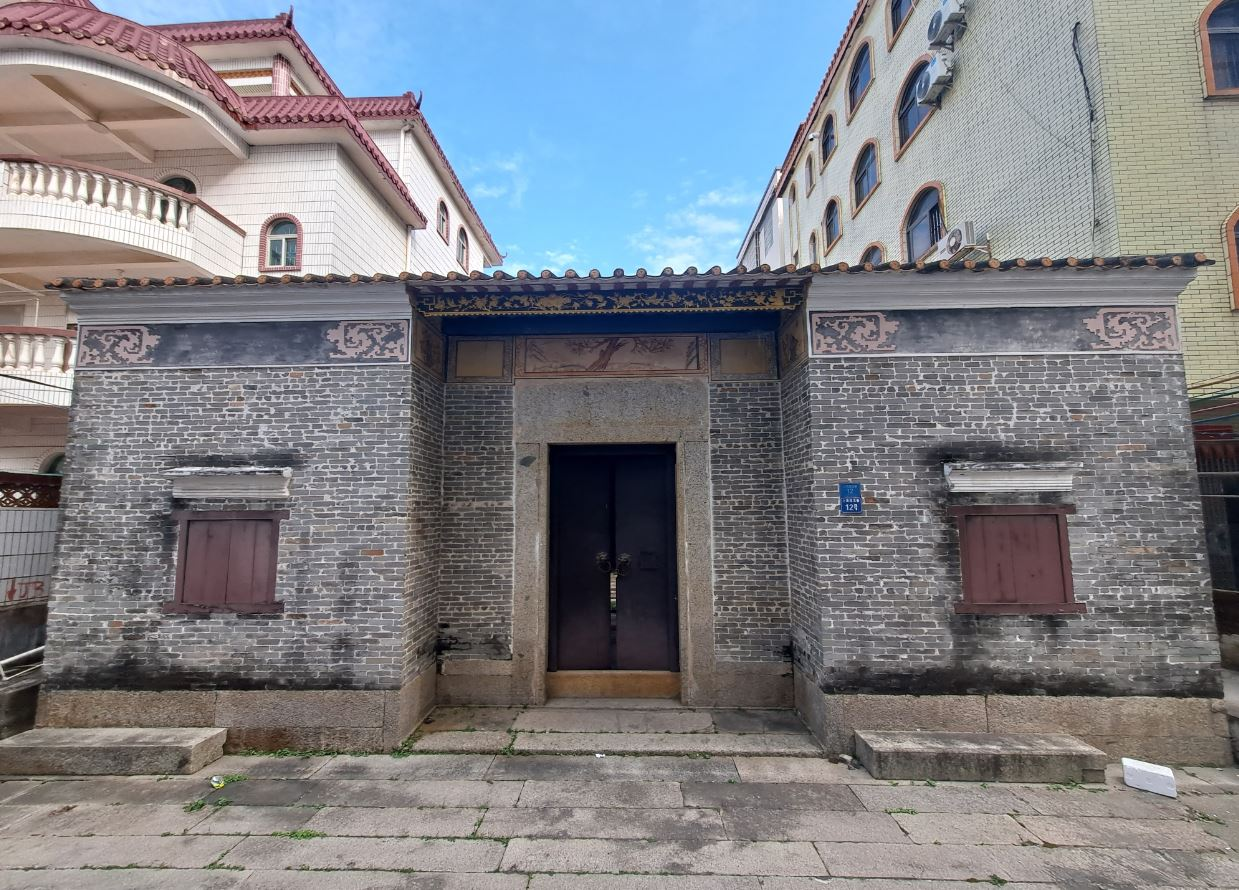
Former station for comfort women on Sanzao

Between April 12 and 14, as a part of scorched earth "mopping up" operations, Japanese troops began massacring civilians and burning villages throughout the northern part of Sanzao; evidence suggests that more than 2,000 residents were killed. Further mass killings by the Japanese during their occupation resulted in 2,891 more deaths, and starvation and famine that occurred after surviving residents were forced from their homes killed around 3,500. Of Sanzao's pre-war population of 12,000, only 1,800 remained by June 1938; any that were not killed in the massacres or subsequent starvations had escaped the island. Around 1,000 refugees that had fled to Macau relocated to the Ying Hang camp in Wanzai in 1939.

Survivors were made to perform forced labor to construct the Japanese airbase; labor from Japan's other occupied territories was imported to accelerate the base's completion. Residents were subject to surveillance, prohibited from leaving Sanzao, and forced to engage with senbu educational and propaganda programs. The Japanese also established 2 schools, the first being for Japanese immigrants brought to colonize the island, and the second, called Zhengbiao, for locals; students of Zhengbiao were forced to learn Japanese and display loyalty to Japan. Stations for comfort women were also set up around Sanzao with locals as well as women from other Japanese colonies. Rape and sexual violence against Sanzao women continued throughout the rest of the occupation.

More than 6,000 Japanese were stationed on Sanzao by the end of September 1938, and the airbase served as an important position in Japanese attacks throughout South China. Japan's position in Sanzao also enabled it to repress Zhuhai's remaining Chinese resistance, and by March 1940 Zhuhai was fully under Japanese control; CCP guerilla units continued to engage with Japanese occupiers in the region's mountainous rural areas and islands.

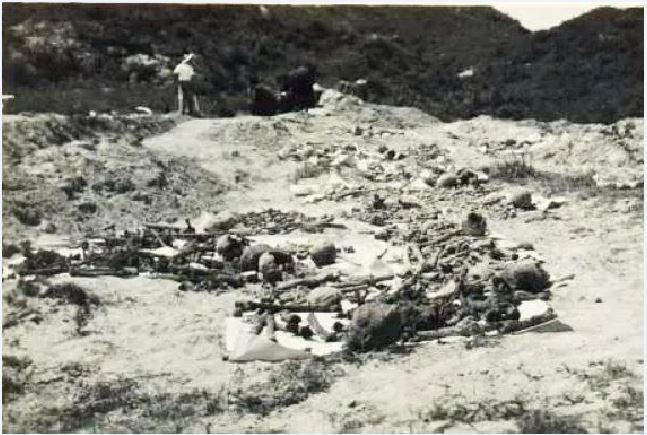
Remains of victims of the Sanzao massacre in 1946. These were collected by survivors after the war's end and eventually interred at the 1948 memorial

After the war, survivors and overseas Chinese funded and constructed a memorial to the victims of Sanzao in 1948, which has since been relocated and designated as a protected cultural site since 1983. Buildings from the former airbase have been preserved and dedicated as historical landmarks. Academic research beginning in the 1990s, which has included interviews with eyewitnesses, has also heightened public understanding of the atrocities committed by the Japanese military at Sanzao.

=== Establishment of Zhuhai through Cultural Revolution ===
In the final months of the Chinese Civil War, the CCP took control of Zhuhai between October 1949 and August 1950, with the Wanshan Archipelago Campaign forcing the KMT from the region. Southwestern Zhongshan and the archipelago around Hong Kong were first designated as "Zhuhai County" in 1952. Further administrative merges and separations occurred between Zhuhai and Zhongshan during the 1950s and 1960s.

With the inception of the CCP's first five-year plan in 1953, Zhuhai's fisheries, many of which were operated by the historically oppressed Tanka people, and farms were collectivized into cooperatives. These were negatively impacted by the Great Leap Forward's subsequent emphasis on steel production and industrialization, which led to food shortages and the emigration of many of Zhuhai's farmers and fishermen to Macau and Hong Kong. The policies of the Land Reform Movement confiscated the property of Zhuhai's many overseas Chinese landlords and families; those with connections to overseas Chinese communities were persecuted.

During the 1960s and through the Cultural Revolution, the CCP considered Zhuhai part of the "frontline of class struggle" as a coastal region adjacent to Macau. This was reflected in its designation as a "border defense area" in 1961 and the establishment of anti-emigration and "anti-sabotage" campaigns in 1962. By 1968, upheavals induced by the Cultural Revolution had undermined Zhuhai's governance structures and economy, leading to a general breakdown in social order. Watchtowers were built around Zhuhai during this period to prevent emigration to Macau and Hong Kong. Strict controls over commerce between Zhuhai and Macau led to a decline in business activity until reforms in 1973 relaxed some restrictions and increased trade. The Macau–Zhuhai border checkpoint at Gongbei was also the location of large Red Guard protests and violent clashes with People's Liberation Army (PLA) troops during the 12-3 incident in December 1966.

=== Foundation of special economic zone and modern development ===
Zhuhai was elevated to city status in 1979; Doumen County was put under its jurisdiction in 1983. As a part of Deng Xiaoping's reforms, Zhuhai became one China's first special economic zones (SEZs) in 1980. This enabled a period of significant economic growth and industrialization; between 1980 and 1984, Zhuhai grew at an average annual rate of 34%, representing a tripling in the size of its economy. These developments attracted significant migration from neighboring provinces. Zhuhai was envisioned by officials to be well positioned for economic cooperation with Macau; infrastructure development was also prioritized. The 1980s also saw Zhuhai become the location of China's first ATM machine, which was installed by the Bank of China in 1987; the Bank of China had earlier launched its first credit card in Zhuhai in 1985. After its annual GDP growth peaked at 68.7% in 1984, Zhuhai began to lag behind other SEZ such as Shenzhen due to factors including a relative lack of logistics infrastructure, its distance from Hong Kong, and underwhelming investment from Macau. This caused some firms to begin leaving the SEZ by the mid-1990s.

In light of Zhuhai's challenges with continued economic expansion, local officials shifted from encouraging export-driven manufacturing and towards the conservation of Zhuhai's natural environment, which they viewed as an asset. The prioritization of environmental protection was also in reaction to the environmental degradation and pollution caused by Zhuhai's rapid development during the 1980s. By the 1990s, Zhuhai's second mayor, Liang Guangda, had reoriented policy towards green growth partially inspired by Singapore's approach to urban planning; regulations introduced as a part of this initiative banned heavy industry, instituted environmental conservation, and promoted green urbanism. Its economic strategy promoted tourism and sustainable development while also cultivating sectors including electronics manufacturing, education, and real estate; this produced companies including Gree Electric and Meizu. In recognition of its efforts towards sustainable development, Zhuhai was awarded the Dubai International Award for Best Practices by the United Nations Human Settlements Programme in 1998.

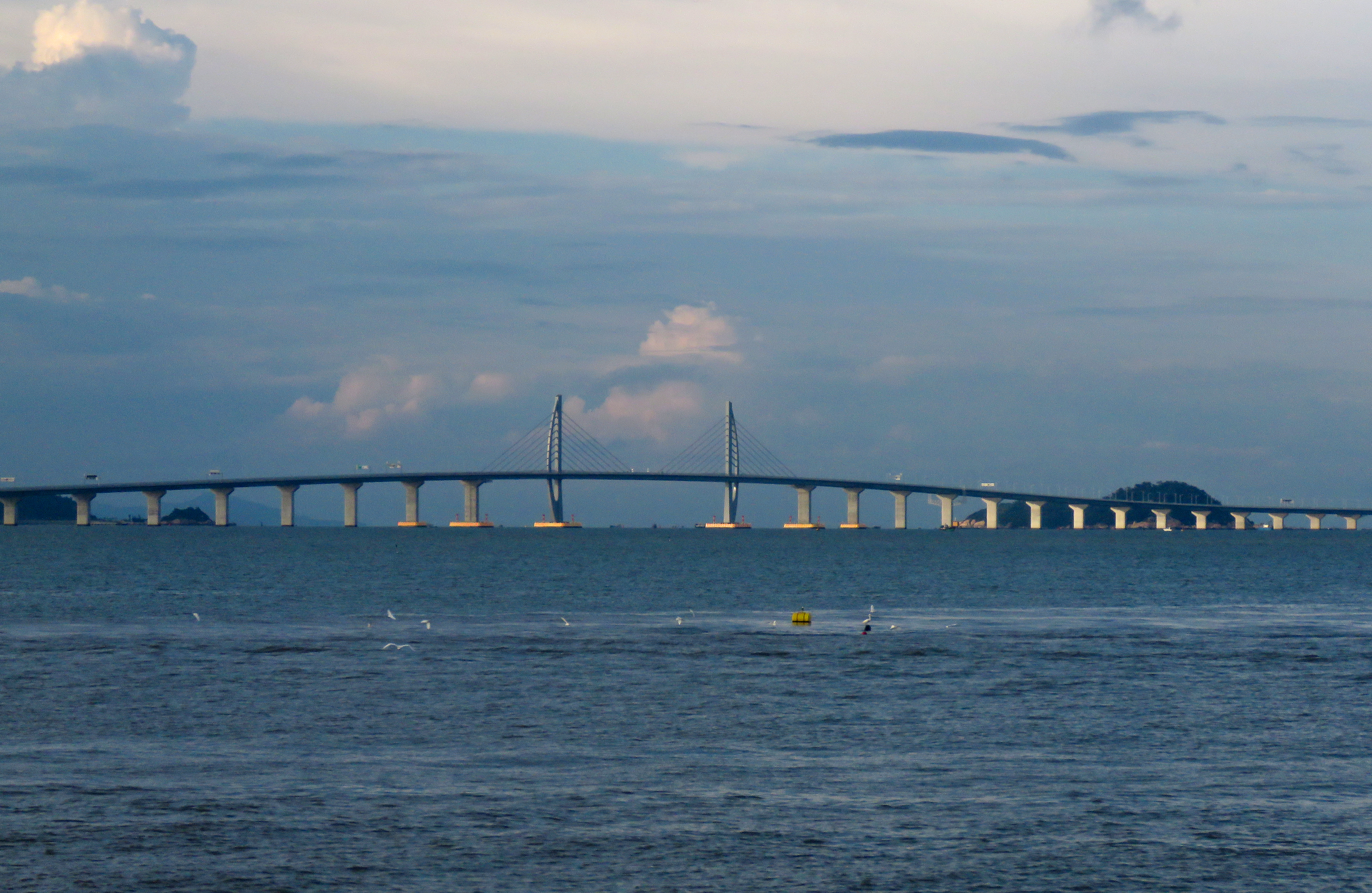
Zhuhai section of the Hong Kong-Zhuhai-Macau Bridge. The longest sea-crossing bridge in the world, it was completed in February 2018

In the 21st century, Zhuhai has received heavy investment under the central government's plans to integrate the Pearl River Delta metropolitan region, most notably via the Hong Kong–Zhuhai–Macau Bridge. The Guangdong-Macao In-Depth Cooperation Zone in Hengqin has also been subject to significant attention from high-level officials, including Xi Jinping, as a site for further economic and political integration between Macau and Mainland China.

== Population ==
The population of Zhuhai has experienced steady growth from 2014 to 2023. In 2014, the city's population was approximately 1.51 million, which increased to about 2.49 million by the end of 2023.

- 2014: 1.51 million
- 2015: 1.54 million
- 2016: 1.57 million
- 2017: 1.60 million
- 2018: 1.64 million
- 2019: 1.67 million
- 2020: 2.44 million
- 2021: 2.47 million
- 2022: 2.48 million
- 2023: 2.49 million

== Geography ==
=== Location ===
Zhuhai is positioned along the southwest bank of the Pearl River Delta. The prefecture-level cities of Jiangmen and Zhongshan are located to Zhuhai's west and north, respectively. Zhuhai is directly adjacent to Macao, with which it has 3 border crossings at Wanzai, Gongbei, and Hengqin. In total, Zhuhai covers an area of 7,836 square kilometers; 1,711 square kilometers of this is land surface, while the rest consists of its ocean territory in the South China Sea that borders Hong Kong.

=== Terrain and landscape ===
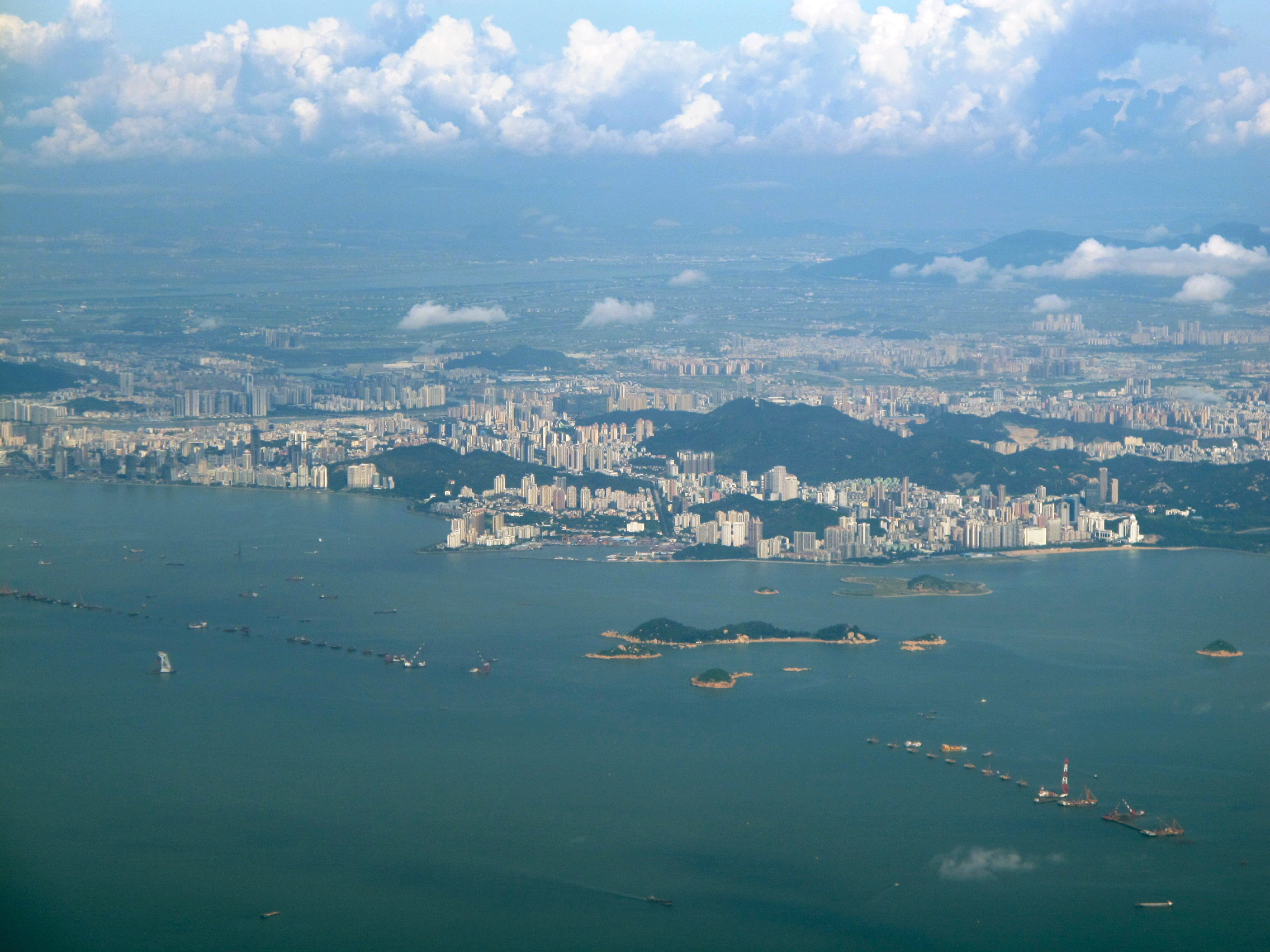
2013 aerial image of Zhuhai's Xiangzhou District, illustrating its islands, cityscape, and terrain

Zhuhai's terrain consists of mountains and alluvial plains, with hills concentrated in its more inland areas. Various rivers, lakes, and ponds are distributed especially in its western regions. Major waterways include the Xi River, which bisects Zhuhai and separates Xiangzhou District from Jinwan and Doumen Districts. The urban core of Zhuhai has historically been concentrated in Xiangzhou and Jinwan. Development in the 21st century has spread to Doumen, which was formerly more agricultural. This has been encouraged since the early 2000s by Zhuhai's municipal government as its population has expanded. Zhuhai has jurisdiction over an archipelago of 262 islands beyond its main coastline that span the lower Lingding Bay; 10 of these are inhabited. Zhuhai's geology is defined primarily by soil deposits dating from the Quaternary period that consist of silt, clay, and sand. This more recent stratum is punctuated by Jurassic era intrusive granite that form most of Zhuhai's islands and highland areas.

=== Ecology ===
Zhuhai's forested areas, which are mostly populated with tropical evergreen broadleaf trees, are generally distributed in the city's mountainous regions; some occupy land that was previously cultivated. This has been driven by government policy, which has incorporated growth of green spaces and vegetation to support ecological restoration and tourism. As a result, almost all of Zhuhai's forests are considered urban and are contained within protected parklands that were established between the mid-1990 and through the 2000s.

Zhuhai's other land-based natural ecosystems consist of grassland, wetlands, shallows, tidal flats, and rivers. Zhuhai's marine environments host species like the Indo-Pacific humpback dolphin as well as coral reefs, such as those at Wailingding Island. Zhuhai's nature preserves include the Zhuhai Qi'ao-Dang'an Provincial Nature Reserve, which contains a 5,301 hectare protected wetland sanctuary on Qi'ao Island that hosts one of Zhuhai's remaining coastal mangrove forests, and the Dang'an Island Macaque Nature Reserve, which hosts a population of over 1,300 native macaques and a variety of other plant and animal species.

Zhuhai

Climate chart (precipitation, max. and min. temperature)
J	F	M	A	M	J	J	A	S	O	N	D
37 19 13	43 20 14	75 22 17	176 26 21	306 29 24	417 31 26	317 32 26	349 32 26	233 31 25	70 29 23	42 25 19	33 20 15
- █ Average max. and min. temperatures in °C
- █ Precipitation totals in mm
Imperial conversion
J	F	M	A	M	J	J	A	S	O	N	D
1.5 66 55	1.7 67 58	3 72 62	6.9 78 69	12 85 75	16 88 78	12 90 79	14 89 79	9.2 88 77	2.8 83 73	1.6 76 66	1.3 69 58
- █ Average max. and min. temperatures in °F
- █ Precipitation totals in inches

Due to its rapid development and industrialization, the quantity of Zhuhai's natural landscape has changed dramatically since the 1980s. Between 1991 and 2018, Zhuhai's ecological land decreased by 32.3%, ultimately encompassing 574.6 kilometers squared of the city's total land area; the majority of this decline was represented by the removal of river and coastal shallow environments. Most of these changes occurred between 1991 and 2000 as Xiangzhou and Jinwan urbanized; this period has been followed by general stabilization of Zhuhai's natural land area as government policy has shifted towards greater environmentalism.

=== Climate ===
Zhuhai has a monsoon-influenced, marine humid subtropical climate (Köppen: Cwa), with long, hot and humid summers with frequent thunderstorms, and short, mild and dry winters. Monthly average temperatures range from 15 and 28 °C (59 and 82 °F) respectively. Precipitation is frequent, amounting to an average of 1,700 mm to 2,200 mm. Annual average humidity is around 80%.

Zhuhai experiences two distinct rainy seasons between April and October. During the late spring and early summer, it is affected by the East Asian rainy season, which is characterized by high humidity and rainfall. Into summer and mid-autumn, the East Asian monsoon season brings heavy rain events and typhoons, generally between June and October. Extreme weather events, such as Typhoon Hato in 2017, occur around 4 times annually and can incur significant economic losses. 85% of Zhuhai's annual precipitation takes place during these two periods.

Climate data for Zhuhai, elevation 51 m (167 ft), (1991–2020 normals, extremes 1962–2016)
Month	Jan	Feb	Mar	Apr	May	Jun	Jul	Aug	Sep	Oct	Nov	Dec	Year
Record high °C (°F)	27.8 (82.0)	28.8 (83.8)	30.5 (86.9)	33.2 (91.8)	35.3 (95.5)	36.8 (98.2)	38.7 (101.7)	37.3 (99.1)	36.3 (97.3)	34.8 (94.6)	32.9 (91.2)	29.1 (84.4)	38.7 (101.7)
Mean daily maximum °C (°F)	18.7 (65.7)	19.5 (67.1)	22.0 (71.6)	25.7 (78.3)	29.2 (84.6)	31.2 (88.2)	32.1 (89.8)	31.9 (89.4)	30.9 (87.6)	28.5 (83.3)	24.7 (76.5)	20.4 (68.7)	26.2 (79.2)
Daily mean °C (°F)	15.3 (59.5)	16.3 (61.3)	18.9 (66.0)	22.6 (72.7)	26.1 (79.0)	28.1 (82.6)	28.8 (83.8)	28.5 (83.3)	27.7 (81.9)	25.4 (77.7)	21.5 (70.7)	17.1 (62.8)	23.0 (73.4)
Mean daily minimum °C (°F)	12.9 (55.2)	14.2 (57.6)	16.9 (62.4)	20.6 (69.1)	24.0 (75.2)	25.8 (78.4)	26.3 (79.3)	26.1 (79.0)	24.8 (76.6)	23.0 (73.4)	19.0 (66.2)	14.5 (58.1)	20.7 (69.2)
Record low °C (°F)	2.0 (35.6)	3.0 (37.4)	2.7 (36.9)	9.4 (48.9)	14.8 (58.6)	18.6 (65.5)	20.9 (69.6)	20.9 (69.6)	17.4 (63.3)	10.5 (50.9)	5.2 (41.4)	2.5 (36.5)	2.0 (35.6)
Average precipitation mm (inches)	36.9 (1.45)	42.9 (1.69)	75.2 (2.96)	175.5 (6.91)	306.3 (12.06)	416.5 (16.40)	317.4 (12.50)	349.2 (13.75)	233.0 (9.17)	70.4 (2.77)	41.9 (1.65)	32.5 (1.28)	2,097.7 (82.59)
Average precipitation days (≥ 0.1 mm)	6.1	9.0	12.8	13.3	15.9	18.9	17.4	16.4	12.7	6.5	5.4	5.2	139.6
Average relative humidity (%)	73	80	84	86	85	85	83	83	79	72	72	68	79
Mean monthly sunshine hours	132.7	94.1	82.3	104.9	146.8	171.0	225.3	198.4	188.3	199.6	170.4	153.1	1,866.9
Percentage possible sunshine	39	29	22	28	36	42	55	50	52	56	52	46	42
Source: China Meteorological Administrationall-time December record lowall-time (and January) record low

== Economy ==
In 1980, the government of the People's Republic of China (PRC) announced that the city of Zhuhai would be one of four special economic zones. Those doing business in the SEZ are eligible for a range of incentives provided by the PRC. Zhuhai became a city in 1979, a year before it was designated as one of the first Special Economic Zones of China (SEZ). Similarly to neighbouring Shenzhen, which became the first Special Economic Zone of China in 1978, the implementation of Zhuhai as an SEZ was largely due to its strategic position adjacent to Macau, a capitalist trading center similar to Shenzhen's position with Hong Kong.

The establishment of Zhuhai as an SEZ allowed the Chinese Central Government and economy to have easier access to the Macau and consequently, global market. As a result, Zhuhai is now a major city in the Pearl River Delta region according to the new general urban plan approved by the State Council. The implementation of Special Economy Zone intended for the city to become a key port city, science and education city, scenic and tourism city, and as a regional hub for transportation.

The outstanding geographic location, a wide range of supporting infrastructure and a deep-water port serve as a major attraction for foreign capital. Used foreign investment reached US$10.344 billion in 2008. Among the top 500 enterprises worldwide, 19 of them have investment projects in Zhuhai such as ExxonMobil, BP, Siemens, Carrefour and Matsushita.

=== Manufacturing industries ===
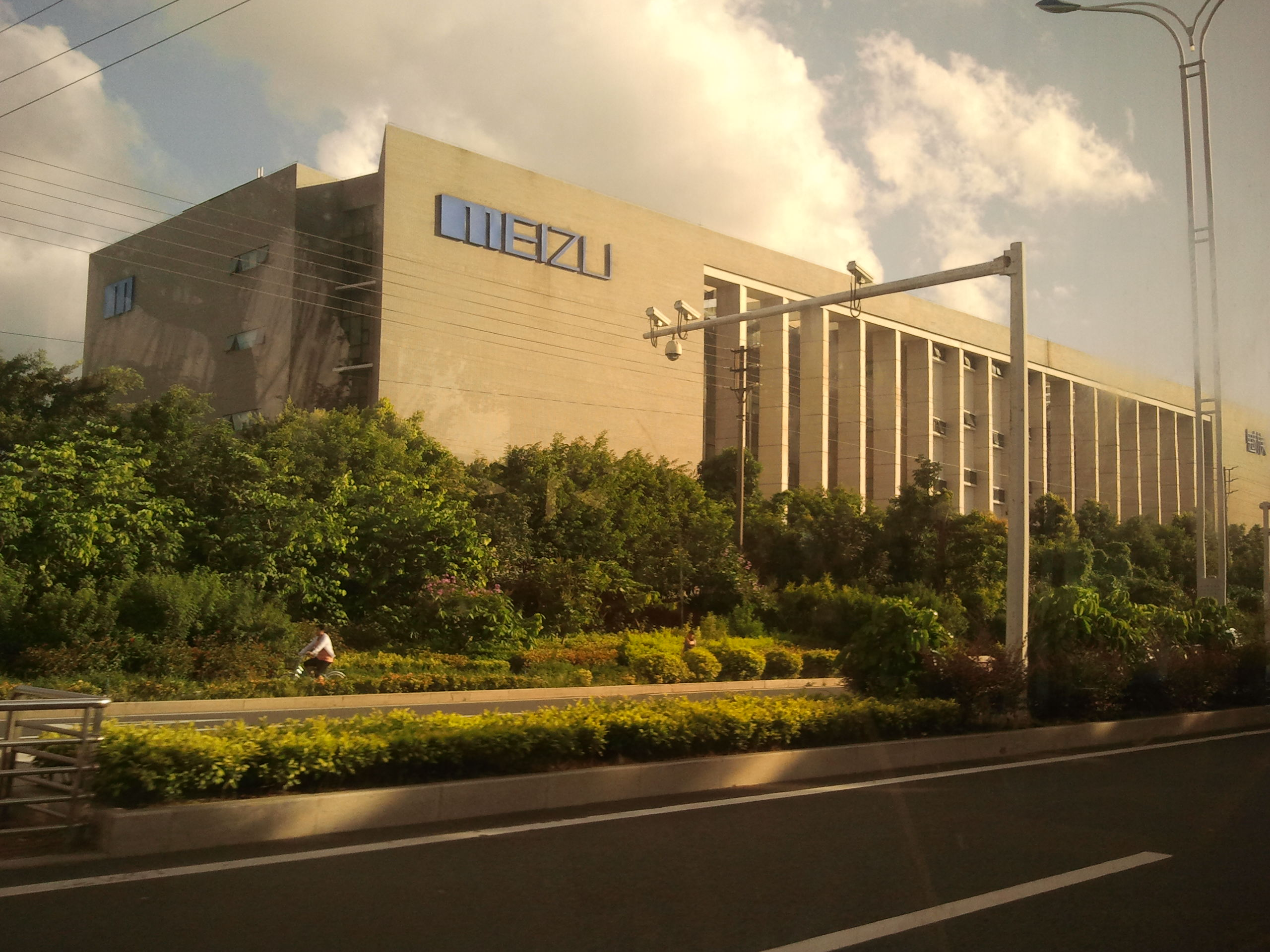
Meizu

Industrial development in Zhuhai focuses on five new high-tech and heavy industries including electronics, computer software, biotechnology and pharmacy, machinery and equipment as well as petrochemical industries. Aiming to strengthen the existing industrial base as well as to provide a better environment for the development of new high-tech industries, the local government has taken the initiative in developing five economic zones:

==== Zhuhai High-Tech Industrial Development Zone ====
As one of the four earliest Special Economic Zones (SEZs) in China, Zhuhai SEZ was set up in the year 1980 and granted with a local legislative right. Zhuhai hi-tech zone is located in the north of Zhuhai, which is very close to downtown. Furthermore, technological resources are centralised in this zone. There is also a huge development in hi-tech industries led by the software and IC industries. The hi-tech zone is the showcase for Zhuhai's scientific development. Meizu is one high tech product headquartered in Zhuhai.

==== Zhuhai Free Trade Zone ====
Zhuhai Free Trade Zone (Zhuhai FTZ) was founded in 1996 with the State Council's approval, occupying 3 km^{2} (1.2 sq mi). A Zhuhai FTZ Administrative Committee was set up in June 1997. By the end of 2006 there had been over 200 companies registered in the Free Trade Zone, including more than 150 foreign-funded enterprises, and the total investment amount was one billion US dollars. Industries encouraged in the zone include electronics assembly and manufacturing, telecommunications equipment, building/construction materials, instruments and industrial equipment production, medical equipment and supplies, raw material processing, research and development, shipping/warehousing/logistics, and heavy industry.

==== Wanshan ocean development testing zone ====
The Wanshan archipelago is located in one of the major fishing areas of China and is core to the Wanshan ocean development testing zone. However, Perna viridis, a species of green mussel, was found to be contaminated by HCHs, DDTs, and PCBs.

==== Hengqin economic development zone ====
In April 2023, the National Development and Reform Commission (NDRC) has published for the Hengqin economic development zone a list of industries that are illegible for investment policies, including income tax benefits for workers. The stated aim of the investment policy is to integrate Macao with key industries in the Pearl River Delta.

==== Global printer consumables manufacturing centre ====
Zhuhai manufactured and supplied 70 per cent of the world's ribbons, 60 per cent of the world's aftermarket inkjet cartridges and 20 per cent of the world's third-party laser toner cartridges. Their combined sales were worth more than 1.3 billion US dollars or 10 per cent of all the sales in the world. Zhuhai owns a comprehensive supply chain and almost any of the raw materials needed by the printer consumables industry can be provided locally.

== Administration ==
The prefecture-level city of Zhuhai administers three county-level divisions and four special economic districts, all of which are districts.

Administrative divisions of Zhuhai
Division code	English name	Chinese	Pinyin	Area in km^{2}	Population 2010	Seat	Postal code	Divisions			
Division code	English name	Chinese	Pinyin	Area in km^{2}	Population 2010	Seat	Postal code	Subdistricts	Towns	Residential communities	Administrative villages
440400	Zhuhai City	珠海市	Zhūhǎi Shì	1724.32	1,562,530	Xiangzhou District	519000	10	15	189	122
440402	Xiangzhou District *	香洲区	Xiāngzhōu Qū	550.84	892,685	Meihua Subdistrict	519000	9	6	141	7
440403	Doumen District	斗门区	Dǒumén Qū	613.88	415,882	Jing'an Town	519100	1	5	23	101
440404	Jinwan District *	金湾区	Jīnwān Qū	559.60	253,963	Hongqi Town	519100		4	25	14
	Guangdong-Macao In-Depth Cooperation Zone in Hengqin	横琴粤澳深度合作区	Héngqín Yuèào Shēndù Hézuòqū	106.46		Hengqin Town	519030				
	Wanshan Marine Development Experimental Zone	万山海洋开发试验区	Wànshān Hǎiyáng Kāifā Shìyànqū	80.00		Wanshan Town	519000				
	Zhuhai National Hi-Tech Industrial Development District	珠海国家高新技术产业开发区	Zhūhǎi Guójiā Gāoxīn Jìshù Chǎnyè Kāifāqū	130.00		Tangjiawan Town	519080				
	Zhuhai Gaolanggang Port Economic Zone	珠海经济技术开发区	Zhūhǎi Jīngjì Jìshù Kāifāqū	380.00		Nanshui Town	519050				
* — The stats includes the subordinated zones. All zones are management areas; not administrative divisions registered under the Ministry of Civil Affairs. * – Guangdong-Macao In-Depth Cooperation Zone in Hengqin, Wanshan Marine Zone, and Hi-Tech Industrial Development District are subordinate to Xiangzhou * – Port Economic Zone are subordinate to Jinwan

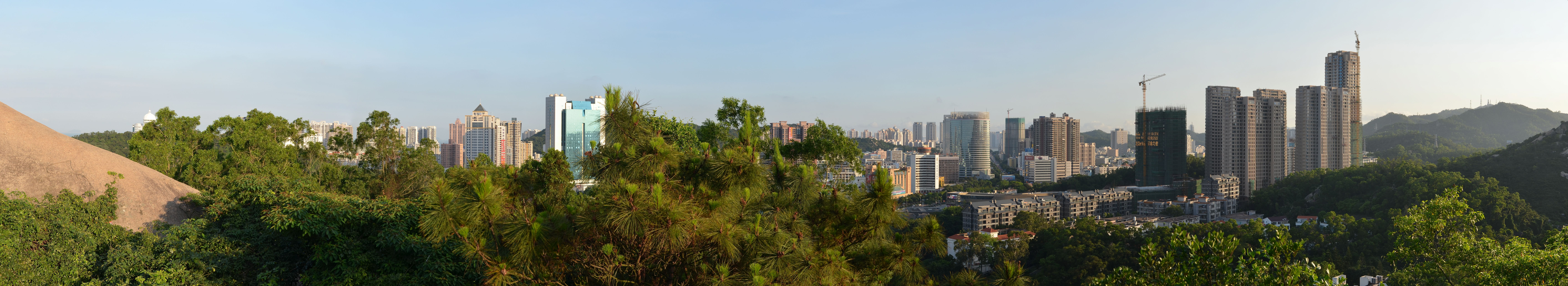
Jida panorama from Shijing mountain (石景山)

== Transportation ==
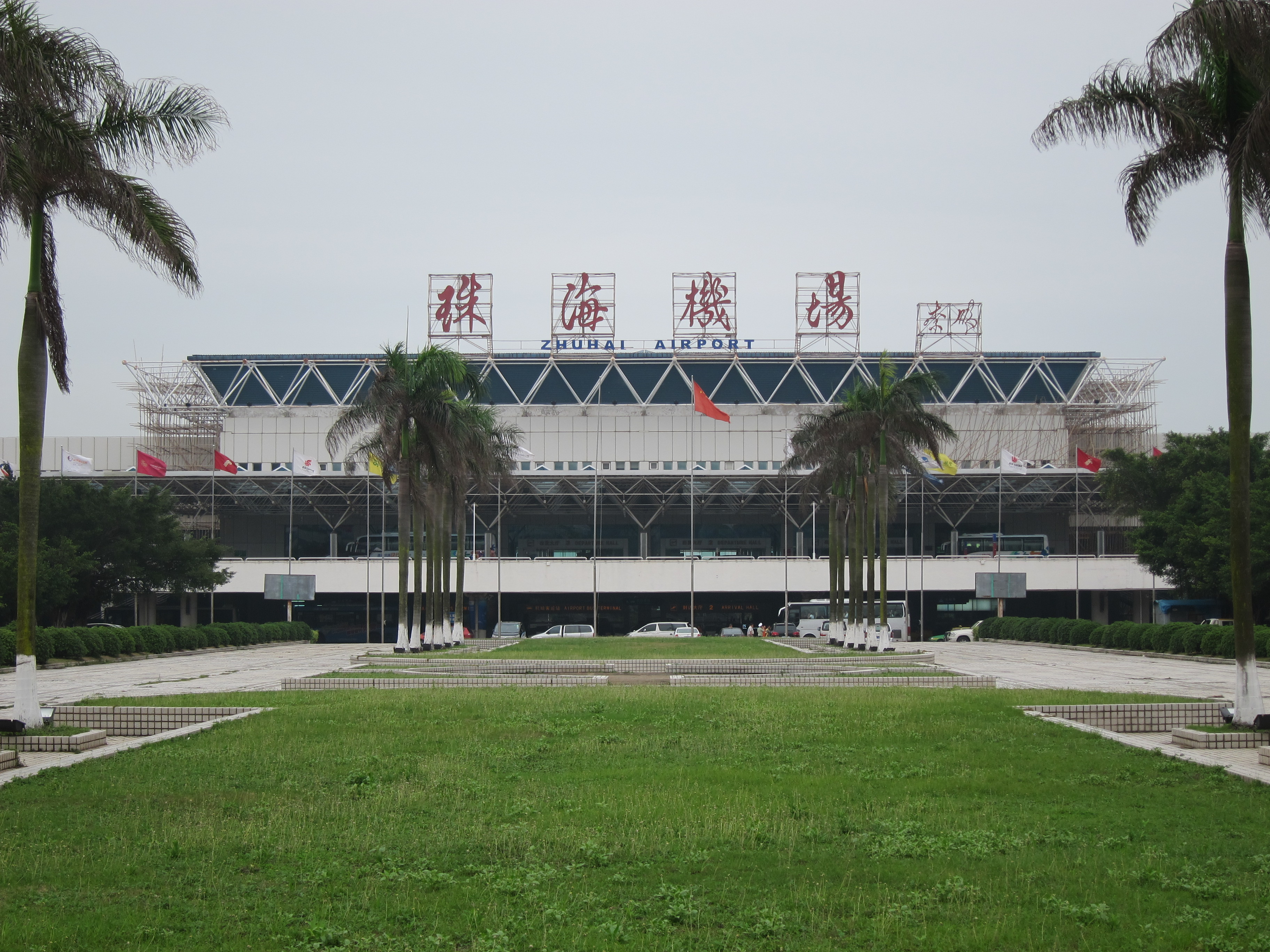
Zhuhai Jinwan Airport

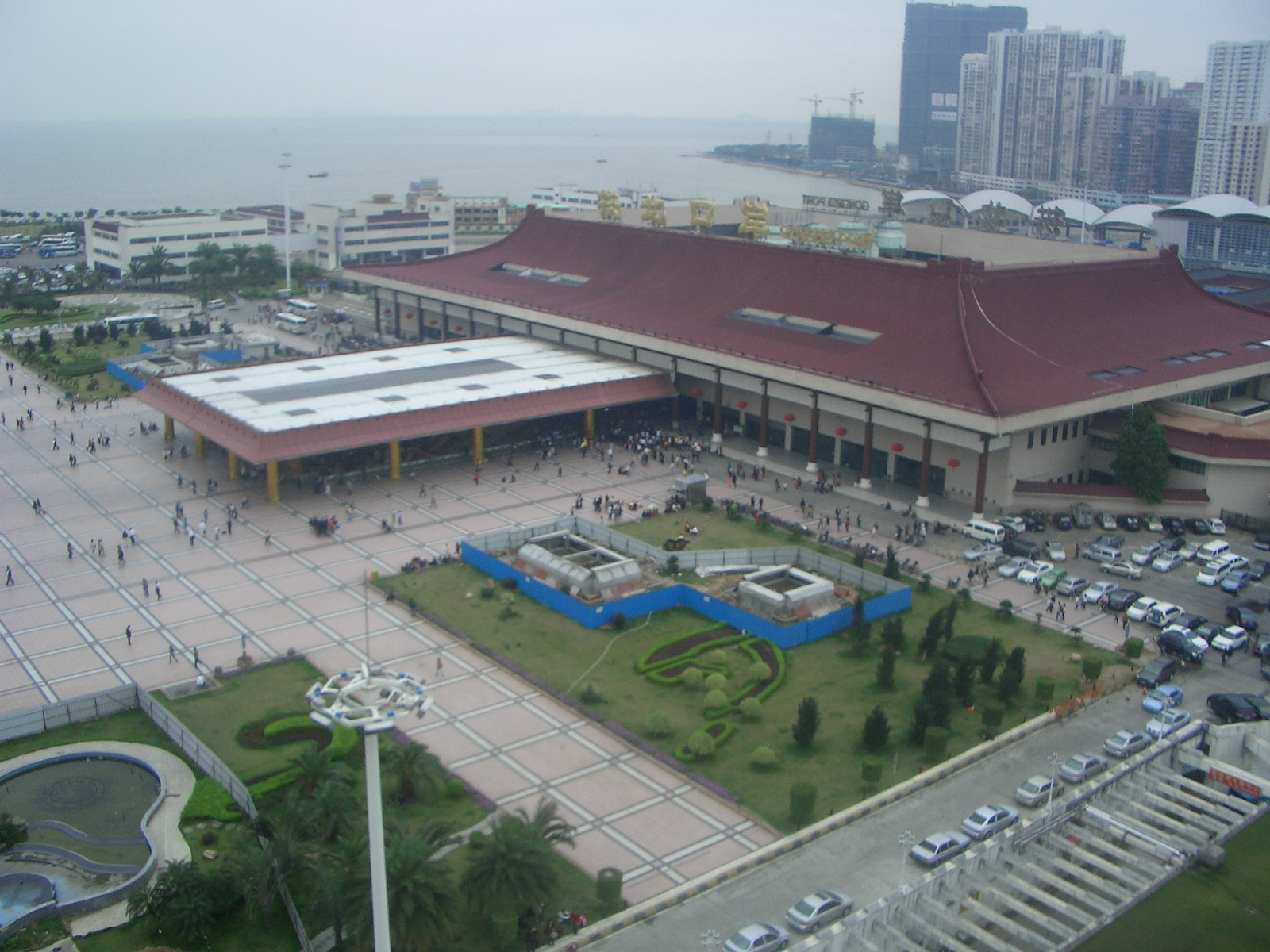
Gongbei Port

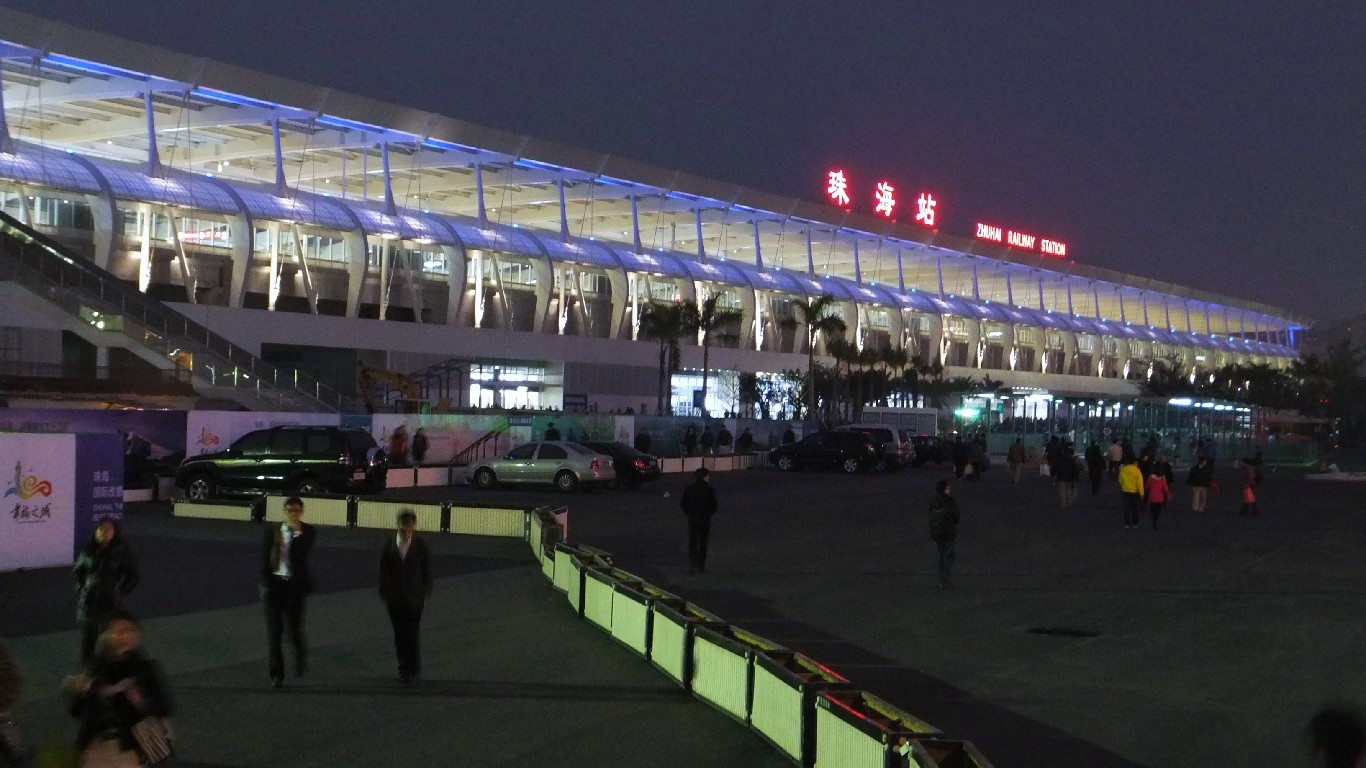
Zhuhai Railway Station

=== Airports ===
- Zhuhai Jinwan Airport (IATA: ZUH, ICAO: ZGSD), formerly Zhuhai Sanzao Airport, an international airport connecting all provincial capital cities in Mainland China (except Xining and Lhasa) and many other major cities, hosting an annual air show and an exhibition hall, with Chinese space rockets located in Jinwan District.
- Jiuzhou Airport (珠海九洲机场), verbally "Jiuzhou Heliport (九州直升机场)") (ICAO: ZGUH), is located in Xiangzhou district, near the Jiuzhou harbour, and has short plane runway and a helipad. Its place inside Jiuzhou inner district, permits quick transport of injured people from surrounding islands to the city hospitals. China Southern Airlines offer sightseeing flights and charters to drilling stations in South China Sea using Sikorsky S-76 helicopters via this airport as well. They used to fly to Guangzhou Baiyun Airport from this airport using Cessna C208 Caravan as well, but the route was discontinued.

Zhuhai also is served by airports outside:

- Macau International Airport (IATA: MFM, ICAO: VMMC), which is closer to the city of Zhuhai proper, than Zhuhai Jinwan Airport itself, has an "Express Link" service in which transiting passengers who go through Gongbei Port of Entry/Posto Fronteiriço das Portas do Cerco are not processed through Macau customs; passengers may also have their baggage taken from Macau Airport to Lotus Bridge in Hengqin Island.
- Hong Kong International Airport (IATA: HKG, ICAO: VHHH); ticketed passengers can take ferries from the Zhuhai Ferry Terminal to the HKIA Skypier. Since its inauguration in September 2018, Zhuhai residents can also reach HKG via Hong Kong-Zhuhai-Macau Bridge.

Zhuhai residents may also use Shenzhen Bao'an International Airport (IATA: SZX, ICAO: ZGSZ) and travel there by bus or ferry.

=== Railway ===
Zhuhai Railway Station is located at the western end of Gongbei Port of Entry and Portas do Cerco at the border of Zhuhai and Macau. There are frequent high speed trains to Guangzhou, Guilin, Beijing, Shanghai, Chengdu and other main cities in China. The intercity railway between Zhuhai Gongbei and Zhuhai Jinwan International Airport is under construction. It is expected to be opened to Hengqin in November 2019, and the whole project will be completed in 2024. It will take only 30 minutes to commute from urban district to the airport using the completed line.

Since 2012 there is also another railway Station in Zhuhai, Xiangzhou District called Mingzhu Station. Which Connects to the Zhuhai-Guangzhou line.

Zhuhai had a tram line between 2017 and 2021. The trams ceased running in January 2021 due to frequent power issues and low patronage, and the tracks were finally removed in 2024.

=== Sea ===
Zhuhai is known for its good climate and good air quality. Endowed with a long coastline, it is the only city on the western Pearl River Delta with natural deep-water ports.

Zhuhai has two international seaports: Jiuzhou (九洲港) and Gaolan (高栏港). Gaolan Port is one of the leading ports in Guangdong province, while Jiuzhou Port focuses on heavy passenger sea transport.

Chu Kong Passenger Transport operates a ferry service between Zhuhai's Jiuzhou Port, Hong Kong and Shekou Passenger Terminal, in the Nanshan District of Shenzhen. A service between Jiuzhou Port and Hong Kong International Airport for air passengers using the airport began on 10 July 2007.

=== Road ===
Zhuhai is currently served by two major Chinese national expressways: G94 Pearl River Delta Ring Expressway

- The G94 Pearl River Delta Ring Expressway, which will form a beltway surrounding the Guangzhou metropolitan area when completed, currently connects Zhuhai to the Sanshui District of Foshan. In 2018 the Hong Kong-Zhuhai-Macau Bridge opened, reducing the travel time by road from Zhuhai to Hong Kong in approximately 40 minutes. G94 was extended to follow this bridge, with sections currently under construction connecting the bridge to the Zhuhai-Foshan section.

G0425 Guangzhou–Macau Expressway

- A spur route of the mainline G4 Beijing–Hong Kong and Macau Expressway, G0425 directly links Guangzhou to Zhuhai (and thus, Macau). It has a concurrency with G94 for several kilometres. Heavy traffic between Zhuhai and Macau has led to the construction of a new cross-border corridor, the Lotus Bridge, built in November 1999 to divert traffic away from the congested Gongbei Port of Entry (Portas do Cerco). G0425 currently ends in Zhuhai at Zhuhai Avenue, pending an extension to the Lotus Bridge via Hengqin island.

=== Hong Kong–Zhuhai–Macau Bridge ===
This bridge was first proposed by Gordon Wu and contemplated by stakeholders, municipal governments in the Pearl River Delta, the provincial government of Guangdong, and the central government of the People's Republic of China. Before the government handover of Hong Kong, the British government also considered plans for a bridge. After 1997, the commercial interests of Hong Kong prompted the local government to consider the plans as well.

On 24 October 2018, the Hong Kong–Zhuhai–Macau Bridge (HZMB) was opened. The bridge connects to Zhuhai via a small island of reclaimed land near the city's eastern coast, northeast of Macau.

== Tourism ==
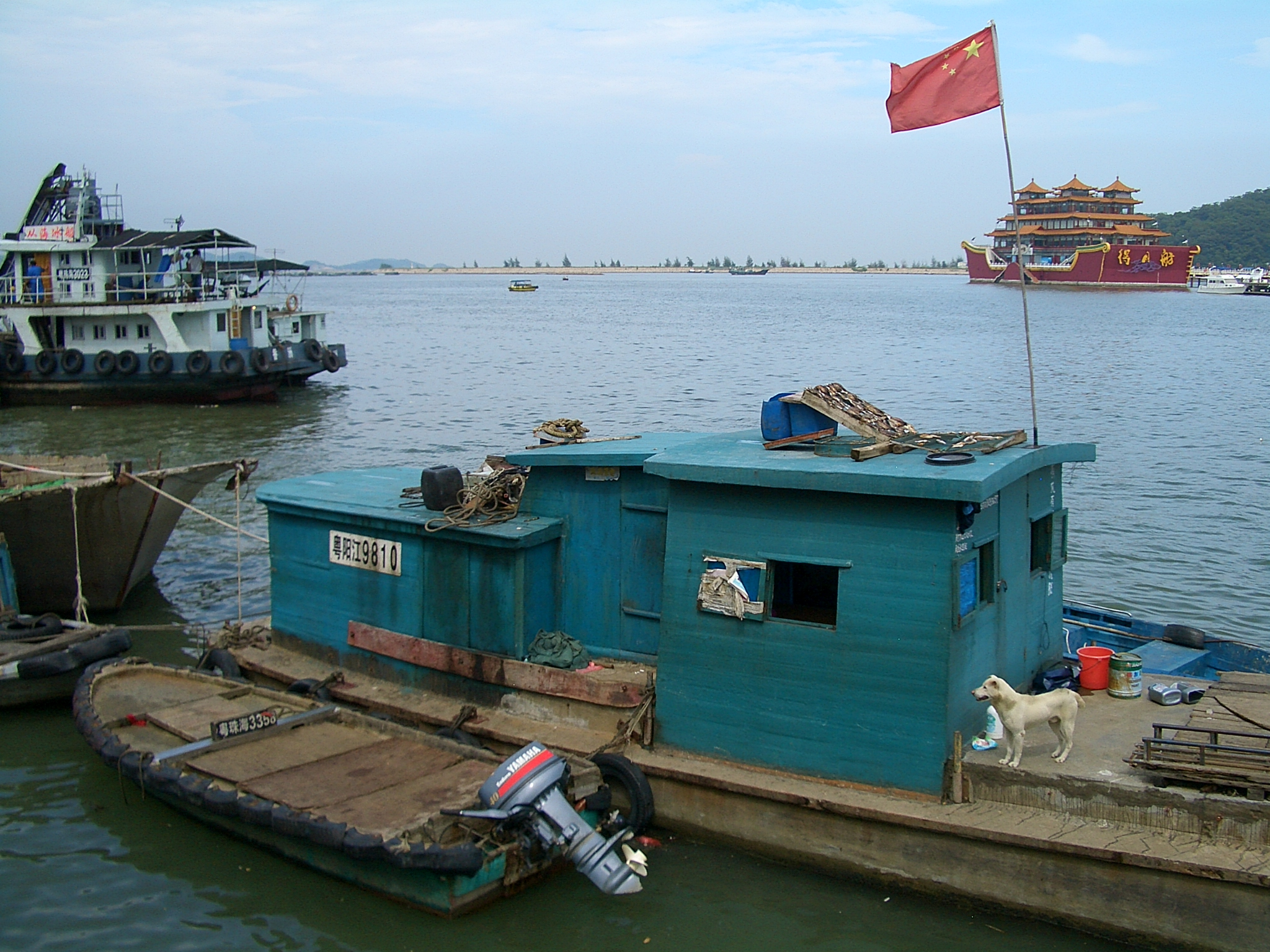
Xiangzhou fishing harbour, with the forested Yeli Island in the horizon

Zhuhai and the surrounding landscapes were developed into an industrial output zone in the 1980s. Prior to that, Zhuhai generated economic development on the basis of tourism, benefiting from the comfortable subtropical climate. Zhuhai enjoys the reputation of a coastal garden city. When environmental pollution from the manufacturing industries threatened the quality of life, Zhuhai introduced strict environmental laws and hired engineers from Singapore to assist the city with urban planning.

Jintai Temple in Doumen, a tourist attraction rebuilt in the 1990s on the site of a historical temple complex.

Realizing the benefits brought by tourism, the local government is expanding tourist destinations and is developing new spots such as Hengqin, Dong'ao (东澳), Hebao, Qi'ao and Yeli (野狸).

=== Exhibitions and conferences ===
Zhuhai hosts the China International Aviation & Aerospace Exhibition biannually in November. It is the largest air show in China and a huge tourist attraction.

=== New Yuan Ming Palace ===
The New Yuanming Palace (simplified Chinese: 圆明新园; traditional Chinese: 圓明新園) is a park of 1.39 square kilometres (0.54 square miles), including an 80,000 m^{2} (861,113 sq ft) lake. It features a partial reconstruction of the Old Summer Palace in Beijing which was destroyed during the Second Opium War and was never rebuilt on its original site.

=== Coast of Xianglu Bay—Fisher Girl Statue ===
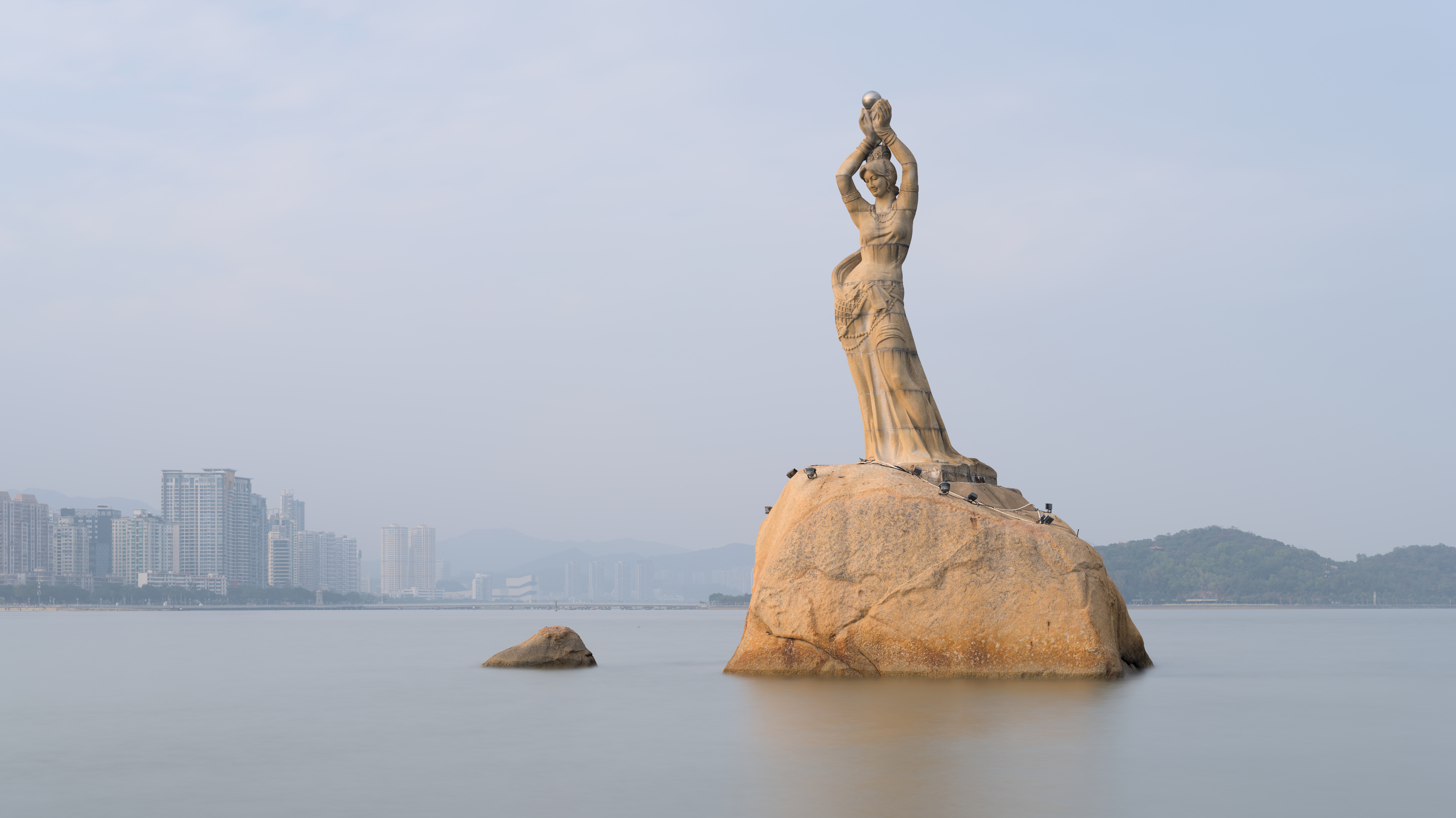
Zhuhai Fisher Girl in Xianglu Bay

The coast of Xianglu Bay is considered the "symbol" of Zhuhai, offering a scenic view of Pearl River Delta with silt-rich water, rocks, and a beach. The famous landmark of the city, Zhuhai Fisher Girl, stands on a boulder in Xianglu Bay; the statue is draped by a fishnet and holds a pearl high in the air with both hands up to the sky, symbolising a vigorous and lively Zhuhai welcoming visitors from all over the world. It was erected in 1982 by Pan He, a professor from the Guangzhou Academy of Fine Arts, and is 8.7 metres (29 ft) tall and composed of 70 pieces of granite. Visitors can view the statue up close from a boardwalk on the shore. The statue was based on a local legend, in which the daughter of the celestial Dragon King visited the Pearl River delta, became a fisherwoman, and married a mortal.

== Education ==
=== Colleges and universities ===
- Beijing Normal University Zhuhai Campus
- Sun Yat-Sen University Zhuhai Campus
- Jinan University Zhuhai Campus
- Zunyi Medical University Zhuhai Campus
- Zhuhai College of Science and Technology
- University of Macau (under the jurisdiction of Macau SAR government)
- Beijing Normal University-Hong Kong Baptist University United International College
- Beijing Institute of Technology, Zhuhai
- Guangdong Polytechnic of Science and Technology Zhuhai Campus
- Zhuhai Art College
- Zhuhai City Polytechnic
- Zhuhai Gree Polytechnic

A number of other colleges and universities are also located in or near Zhuhai. Beijing Normal University Zhuhai Campus was created as a new model university. Besides its high quality of education, it is more internationally oriented than many universities in China. Many students here prepare to go abroad to finish their junior and senior years.

=== Primary and secondary education ===
Despite the shortage of higher education, Zhuhai government has been paying a lot of attention to primary and secondary education. Since the autumn of 2007, students with local household registration are provided with twelve years of free education through primary and secondary school.

As a result, there are many famous high schools in Zhuhai. Zhuhai No.1 High School (ZH1Z) is one of the most competitive high schools in Guangdong Province, and also a member of the Guangdong "Six Schools Union".

Dulwich International High School Zhuhai, QSI International School of Zhuhai, and Zhuhai International School serve expatriates and/or use foreign educational systems.

=== Supplementary schools ===
Zhuhai Japanese Saturday School (珠海日本人補習校) is a supplementary school for overseas Japanese in Zhuhai. It holds classes at QSI School.

== Sports facilities ==
Zhuhai is the first city in China to have constructed a motor racing circuit. The Zhuhai International Circuit was built in 1996 and is located at Jinding, near the border to Zhongshan. ZIC has held the BPR Global GT Endurance Series in 1996, the FIA GT Championship in 1997, 1999, 2004 and 2005. It hosted the championship's 2007 opening round on 24 and 25 March. ZIC had planned to host a round of the Champ Car World Series on 20 May 2007, but agreement was not reached. ZIC held an A1GP race in 2007 for the first time in series' history. ZIC became the first venue in China to host the Intercontinental Le Mans Cup on 7 November 2010 when the 2010 1000 km of Zhuhai was staged.

Zhuhai has also a new tennis center which hosts WTA Elite Trophy, the last tournament of the year for players that are in the top 20 but did not qualify to WTA Finals.

There is the Zhuhai Stadium that is used for football matches.

== Notable people ==
=== Notable people ===
- Rong Hong (1828–1912), first Chinese student to graduate from a western university
- Huang Kuan (1828–1878), first Chinese person to study in Europe
- Tang Tingshu (1832–1892), general manager of China Merchants' Steam Navigation Company
- Tang Shaoyi (1862–1938), first Premier of the Republic of China
- Su Zhaozheng (1885–1929), early phase leader of the Chinese Communist Party
- Lin Weimin (1887–1927), leader of labour movement, member of the Chinese Communist Party
- Yang Pao'an (1896–1931), early phase leader of the Chinese Communist Party
- Rong Guotuan (1937–1968), first Chinese world champion in table tennis.
- Dong Mingzhu (1954–), chairperson of Gree Electric
- Zhang Lianwei (1965–), Chinese professional golfer
- Yi Siling (1989–), Chinese sport shooter, Champion of Women's 10 metre air rifle at London 2012 Olympics
- Hon Chio Leong (2001–), Macanese racing driver and two-time Macau Grand Prix champion

=== Mayors and CPC Committee Secretaries ===
==== Mayors ====
Names	In office	Life–death
Wu Jianmin	January 1979 – June 1984	1921–2015
Liang Guangda	June 1984 – October 1995	1935–
Huang Longyun	October 1995 – October 2000	1951–
Fang Xuan	October 2000 – August 2002	1954–
Wang Shunsheng	August 2002 – January 2007	1949–
Zhong Shijian	January 2007 – October 2011	1956–
He Ningka	October 2011 – January 2015	1959–
Jiang Ling	January 2015 – January 2016	1964–
Vacant	January 2016 – May 2016	N/A
Zheng Renhao	April 2016 – March 2017 (Note: As mayor nominee during April–May 2016)	1968–
Li Zezhong	March 2017 – September 2017	1970–
Yao Yisheng	September 2017 – May 2021	1965–
Huang Zhihao	May 2021 – December 2024 (Note: As acting mayor during May–June 2021)	1970–
Wu Zetong	December 2024 - (Note: As acting mayor since December 2024)	1980 –

==== CPC Committee Secretaries ====
Names	In office	Life–death
Wu Jianmin	January 1979 – February 1984	1921–2015
Fang Bao	February 1984 – January 1987	1931–
Liang Guangda	January 1987 – September 1998	1935–
Huang Longyun	October 1998 – August 2002	1951–
Fang Xuan	August 2002 – August 2005	1954–
Deng Weilong	August 2005 – March 2008	1950–
Gan Lin	March 2008 – February 2012	1963–
Li Jia	February 2012 – March 2016	1964–
Guo Yuanqiang	March 2016 – January 2018	1965–
Guo Yonghang	February 2018 – November 2021 (Note: As CPC Secretary nominee during February–April 2018)	1965–
Lü Yuyin	November 2021 – June 2023	1970–
Vancant	June 2023 – September 2023	N/A
Chen Yong	September 2023 –	1974–

== Sister cities ==
- Portsmouth, United Kingdom
- Atami, Japan
- Braunschweig, Germany
- Castelo Branco, Portugal
- Gold Coast, Australia
- Gwadar District, Pakistan
- Halifax, Canada
- Luganville, Vanuatu
- Providence, United States
- Redwood City, United States
- La Spezia, Italy
- Surrey, Canada
- Vitória, Brazil
- Zhukovsky, Russia

== See also ==
- Hengqin, an offshore island administered by Zhuhai
- Wanshan Qundao, 104 island archipelago in the South China Sea

== Bibliography ==
- Anthony, Robert J. (2021). "Defending Canton: Chinese Pirates, British Traders, and Hong Merchants, 1780−1810". Review of Culture (66): 70–95.
- Cui, Nan; Feng, Chen-Chieh; Wang, Dan; Li, Jianfei; Guo, Luo (21 September 2018). "The Effects of Rapid Urbanization on Forest Landscape Connectivity in Zhuhai City, China". Sustainability. 10 (10): 3381. Bibcode:2018Sust...10.3381C. doi:10.3390/su10103381.
- Hao, Zhidong (2011). Macau History and Society. Hong Kong: Hong Kong Univ. Press [u.a.] ISBN 978-988-8028-54-2.
- Him, Mark Lai (9 May 2007). "Zhongshan, Zhuhai, and Macau: Geographical and Historical Notes". himmarklai.org. Chinese Historical Society of America.
- Hong, Gang (2017). "Locating Zhuhai between land and sea: a relational production of Zhuhai, China, as an island city". Island Studies Journal. 12 (2): 7–24. doi:10.24043/ISJ.16. S2CID 55941839.
- Hu, Yunfeng; Zhang, Yunzhi (30 September 2020). "Spatial–temporal dynamics and driving factor analysis of urban ecological land in Zhuhai city, China". Scientific Reports. 10 (1) 16174. Bibcode:2020NatSR..1016174H. doi:10.1038/s41598-020-73167-0. PMC 7527567. PMID 32999387.
- Huang, Xiaodong (1 September 2011). 珠海简史 (The Brief History of Zhuhai). Beijing: Social Sciences Academic Press. ISBN 978-7-5097-2560-3.
- Ko, Justin (17 November 2025). In Shenzhen's Shadow: Xiamen, Zhuhai, and Shantou (PDF) (1 ed.).
- Li, Lingyue; Xian, Shi; Qi, Zhixin (2022). "Planning for Eco-City in China: Policy Mobility in Path Creation of Eco-Zhuhai". Sustainable Development Research. 4 (2): 27–38. doi:10.30560/sdr.v4n2p27.
- Li, Yan (2019). "Chapter 6: A Preliminary Analysis of the Development of Neolithic Culture in Coastal Region of Guangdong". In Wu, Chunming; Rolett, Barry Vladimir (eds.). Prehistoric Maritime Cultures and Seafaring in East Asia. Springer Nature. pp. 103–126. ISBN 978-981-32-9255-0.
- Liu, Miaomiao; Chen, Guishan; Li, Guanhua; Huang, Yingyu; Luo, Kaiwei; Zhan, Changfa (2023). "Landscape Evolution and Its Driving Forces in the Rapidly Urbanized Guangdong–Hong Kong–Macao Greater Bay Area, a Case Study in Zhuhai City, South China". Sustainability. 15 (7) 13045. doi:10.3390/su151713045.
- Qiu, Peipei (2023). "Chapter 20: Narrating Trauma: Memories of the Atrocities under the Japanese Occupation of Sanzao Island". In Burrett, Tina; Kingston, Jeff (eds.). Routledge Handbook of Trauma in East Asia. Routledge. pp. 237–249. doi:10.4324/9781003292661. ISBN 978-1-003-29266-1.
- Relics and Archeological Institute of Guangdong Province; Museum of Zhuhai (2004). Zhuhai Baojingwan: Archaeological Report of Island-type Prehistoric Cultural Site (PDF) (1 ed.). Beijing: China Science Publishing & Media. ISBN 7-03-012459-6.
- Sheng, N.; Tang, U.W. (2013). "City Profile: Zhuhai". Cities. 32: 70–79. doi:10.1016/j.cities.2013.02.006.
- Sun, Huimin; Peng, Hongxia; Zeng, Min; Wang, Simiao; Pan, Yujie; Pi, Pengcheng; Xue, Zixuan; Zhao, Xinwen; Zhang, Ao; Liu, Fengmei (2023). "Land Subsidence in a Coastal City Based on SBAS-InSAR Monitoring: A Case Study of Zhuhai, China". Remote Sensing. 15 (9): 2424. Bibcode:2023RemS...15.2424S. doi:10.3390/rs15092424.
- Viana, Venus (31 August 2012). Modernizing Zhongshan: The Implementation of Nation-building Policies and Responses of the Local People, 1930-1949 (PDF). Hong Kong: Hong Kong University of Science and Technology.
- Yeung, Yue-man; Lee, Joanna; Kee, Gordon (2009). "China's Special Economic Zones at 30". Eurasian Geography and Economics. 50 (2): 222–240. doi:10.2747/1539-7216.50.2.222.
- Yi, Meng Cheng (2025). "A natural alliance? A reappraisal of the Macanese-Portuguese response to the Canton-Hong Kong strike of 1925–6". Historical Research. 98 (282): 561–579. doi:10.1093/hisres/htae032.
- Zhuhai Historical Relics Management Committee (1994). The Records of Historical Relics in Zhuhai (PDF). Guangdong: Guangdong People's Publishing House.
