= Zhuhai City Polytechnic =

Coordinates: 22.135048°N 113.353693°E

Zhuhai City Vocational and Technical College

Location
- JinEr Road, Xihu Chengqu Jinwan District, Zhuhai Guang Dong, China 519090; Zhuhai, Guangdong, China

Information
- Motto: 明德 敬业 乐学 善披
- Principal: Liu Huaqiang
- Affiliation: Service-Learning Asia Network
- Website: http://www.zhcpt.edu.cn/

Zhuhai City Polytechnic is located in Xihu Chengqu Jinwan District, Zhuhai City, Guangdong Province, China, at the previous Zhuhai Institute of Education, Zhuhai University of Radio and Television (Zhuhai Electric University, Zhuhai Open University), Zhuhai City Polytechnic School, Zhuhai City Finance and Trade School (Zhuhai Business School) merged in 2004, mainly for industry education. There are more than 16,000 students in the school. The school covers an area of 360,000 square meters, with a construction area of 88,000 square meters.

== Departments ==
- Electronic Information Engineering
- Mechanical and Electrical Engineering
- School of Aeronautics and Ocean Engineering
- School of Economics and Management
- School of Tourism Management
- College of Humanities and Social Management
- School of Industrial and Art Design
- International Institute for International Cooperation and Exchange
