= List of bridge–tunnels =

List of bridge–tunnels:

== List ==
List
Bridge–tunnel	Completion	Country	Location	Body/ies of water	Notes
Hampton Roads Bridge–Tunnel	1957/1976/2027	United States	Norfolk and Hampton, Virginia	Hampton Roads	
Chesapeake Bay Bridge–Tunnel	1964/1999/2030s	United States	Virginia Beach and Northampton County, Virginia	Chesapeake Bay	
Louis-Hippolyte Lafontaine Bridge–Tunnel	1967	Canada	Montreal (Mercier–Hochelaga-Maisonneuve), and Longueuil, Quebec	Saint Lawrence River	bridge–tunnel transition uses natural island
Cross-Harbour Tunnel and Canal Road Flyover	1972	China	Happy Valley, Kellett Island and Hung Hom Bay, Hong Kong	Victoria Harbour and Bowrington Canal	bridge–tunnel transition uses natural island and over reclaimed land; Bowrington Canal now covered
Monitor–Merrimac Memorial Bridge–Tunnel	1992	United States	Suffolk and Newport News, Virginia	Hampton Roads	
Tokyo Bay Aqua-Line	1997	Japan	Kawasaki (in Kanagawa Prefecture) and Kisarazu (in Chiba Prefecture)	Tokyo Bay	
Tokyo Monorail	1968	Japan	Between Shōwajima and Seibijō	Ebitori RiverEbitori River	bridge–tunnel carrying monorail
Great Belt Fixed Link	1997	Denmark	Zealand and Funen	Great Belt	includes a railway tunnel, bridge–tunnel transition uses natural island
Øresund Bridge	2000	Denmark/Sweden	Copenhagen and Malmö	Øresund/Öresund	includes a railway tunnel
Shanghai Yangtze River Tunnel and Bridge	2009	China	Pudong, Changxing and Chongming	Yangtze River	bridge–tunnel transition uses natural island; includes rail tracks
Busan–Geoje Fixed Link	2010	South Korea	Busan and Geoje Island	South Sea of Korea	bridge–tunnel transition uses natural island
Hong Kong–Zhuhai–Macau Bridge and Hong Kong Link Road	2018	China	Zhuhai (in Guangdong Province), Hong Kong and Macau	Pearl River estuary (Jiuzhouyang), Tung Chung Channel	
Island Eastern Corridor Link and Central–Wan Chai Bypass (Causeway Bay Typhoon Shelter Section)	2019	China	Fortress Hill and Causeway Bay	New Causeway Bay Typhoon Shelter	
Tuen Mun–Chek Lap Kok Link	2020	China	Tuen Mun, Lantau, Hong Kong	Urmston Road	
Shenzhen–Zhongshan Bridge	2024	China	Shenzhen, Zhongshan	Pearl River estuary (Lingdingyang)	

== See also ==
- Transcontinental railroads have many bridge–tunnels.
- Intercontinental and transoceanic fixed links
