= Immersed tube =

Type of undersea tunnel

Schematics of typical immersed tube types

Type A, built upon a shallow trench on the seabed

Type B, built under the seabed level

An immersed tube (or immersed tunnel) is a kind of undersea tunnel composed of segments, constructed elsewhere and floated to the tunnel site to be sunk into place and then linked together. They are commonly used for road and rail crossings of rivers, estuaries and sea channels. Immersed tubes are often used in conjunction with other forms of tunnel at their end, such as a cut and cover or bored tunnel, which is usually necessary to continue the tunnel from near the water's edge to the entrance at the land surface.

== Construction ==
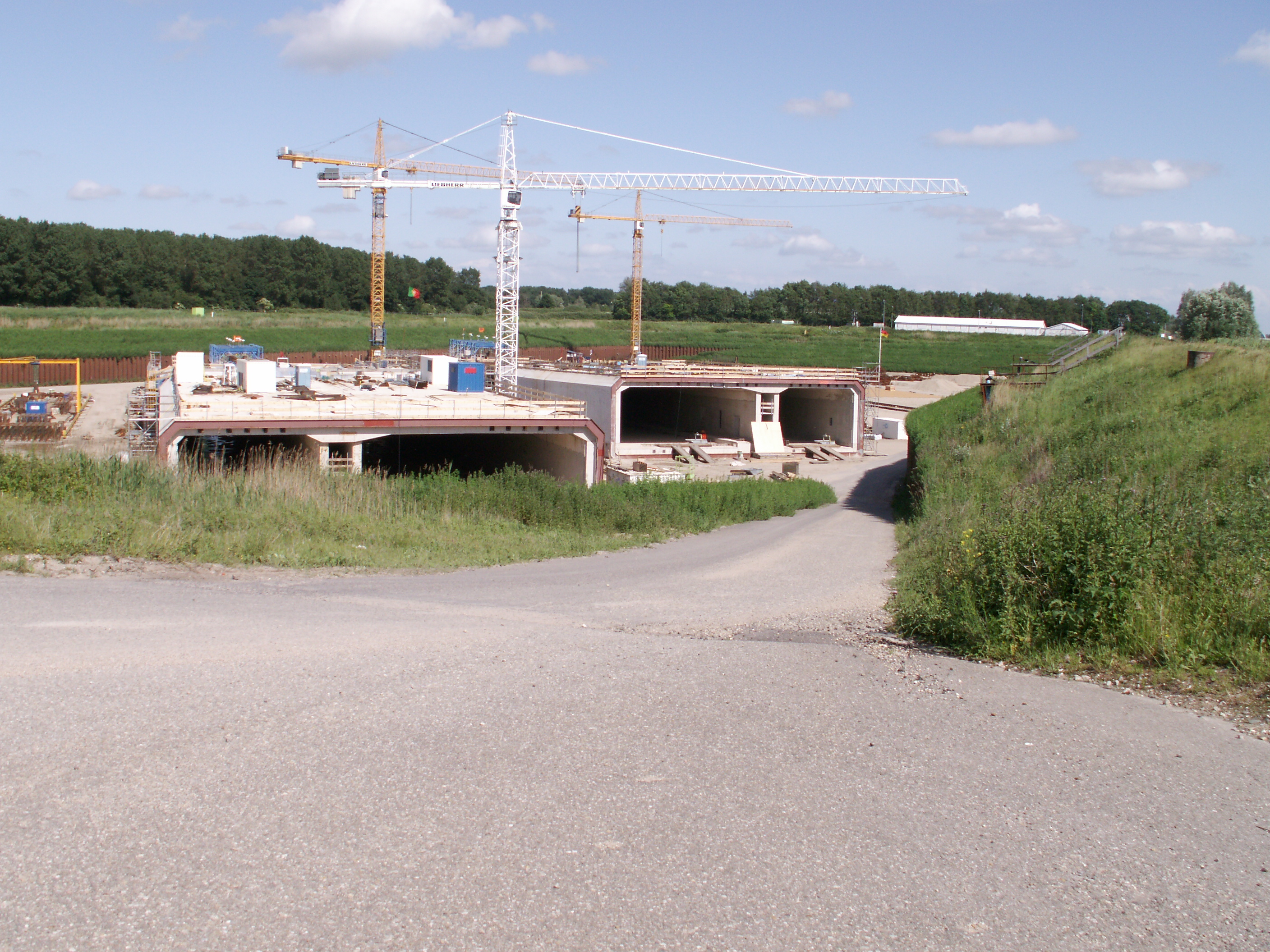
Construction of segments for the second Coen Tunnel in Amsterdam

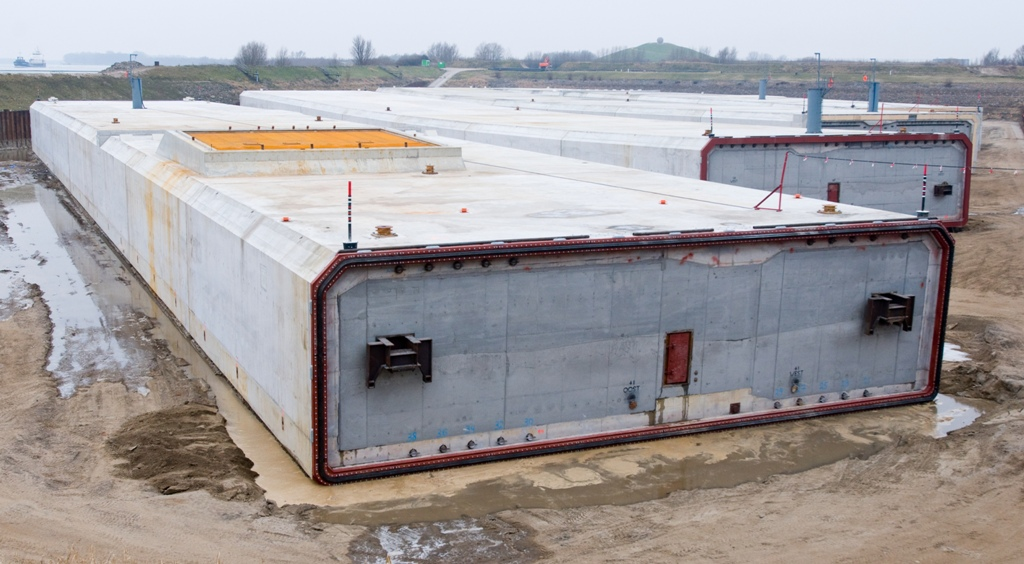
Prefabricated tunnel segments sealed off, ready to be floated to site and sunk into place

The tunnel is made up of separate elements, each prefabricated in a manageable length, then having the ends sealed with bulkheads so they can be floated. At the same time, the corresponding parts of the path of the tunnel are prepared, with a trench on the bottom of the channel being dredged and graded to fine tolerances to support the elements. The next stage is to place the elements into place, each towed to the final location, in most cases requiring some assistance to remain buoyant. Once in position, additional weight is used to sink the element into the final location, this being a critical stage to ensure each piece is aligned correctly. After being put into place, the joint between the new element and the tunnel is emptied of water then made water tight, this process continuing sequentially along the tunnel.

The trench is then backfilled and any necessary protection, such as rock armour, added over the top. The ground beside each end tunnel element will often be reinforced, to permit a tunnel boring machine to drill the final links to the portals on land. After these stages the tunnel is complete, and the internal fitout can be carried out.

The segments of the tube may be constructed in one of two methods. In the United States, the preferred method has been to construct steel or cast iron tubes which are then lined with concrete. This allows use of conventional shipbuilding techniques, with the segments being launched after assembly in dry docks. In Europe, reinforced concrete box tube construction has been the standard; the sections are cast in a basin which is then flooded to allow their removal.

== Advantages and disadvantages ==
The main advantage of an immersed tube is that it can be considerably more cost effective than alternative options such as a bored tunnel (which may not be possible at all due to other factors such as the geology and seismic activity) or a bridge. Other advantages relative to these alternatives include:

- Their speed of construction
- Minimal disruption to the channel, if crossing a shipping route
- Resistance to seismic activity
- Safety of construction (for example, work in a dry dock as opposed to boring beneath a river)
- Flexibility of profile (although this is often partly dictated by what is possible for the connecting tunnel types)

Disadvantages include:

- Immersed tunnels are often partly exposed (usually with some rock armour and natural silting) on the river or sea bed, risking a ship or anchor strike
- Direct contact with water necessitates careful waterproofing design around the joints
- The segmented approach requires careful design of the connections, where longitudinal effects and forces must be transferred across
- Environmental impact of tube and underwater embankment on existing sea bed.

Tubes can be round, oval and rectangular. Larger strait crossings have selected wider rectangular shapes as more cost effective for wider tunnels.

== Examples ==
The first tunnel constructed with this method was the Shirley Gut Siphon, a six-foot sewer main laid in Boston, Massachusetts in 1893. The first example built to carry traffic was the Michigan Central Railway Tunnel constructed in 1910 under the Detroit River, and the first to carry road traffic is the Posey Tube, linking the cities of Alameda and Oakland, California in 1928. The oldest immersed tube in Europe is the Maastunnel in Rotterdam, which opened in 1942.

The Marmaray Tunnel, connecting the European and Asian sides of Istanbul, Turkey, is the world's deepest immersed tunnel at 55 metres (180 ft) below sea level; it is the first rail link crossing the straits. Construction began in 2004 and revenue service began in 2013. The tunnel is 13.6 kilometres (8.5 mi) long overall, of which 1.4 kilometres (0.87 mi) were constructed using the immersed tube technique.

Currently the longest immersed tube tunnel is the 6.7-kilometre-long (4.2 mi) tunnel portion of the Hong Kong–Zhuhai–Macau Bridge, completed in 2018. The HZMB tunnel is set at a depth of 30 metres (98 ft) below sea level. Its length will be surpassed by 1.2 metres (3 ft 11 in) with the completion of the Shenzhen–Zhongshan Bridge in 2024. The SZB project includes a 6.7 km-long (4.2 mi) immersed tube which also will be the world's widest immersed tube, carrying eight traffic lanes. Prior to the completion of the Marmaray and HZMB tunnels, the Transbay Tube in San Francisco Bay, completed in 1969, was the world's deepest and longest immersed tube, at 41 metres (135 ft) below water level and 5.8 kilometres (3.6 mi) long.

The length of both the HZMB and SZB will be surpassed by the Fehmarn Belt Fixed Link connecting Denmark and Germany when it is completed, at an as-designed 17.6 kilometres (10.9 mi) long. Construction started on 1 January 2021.

Largest immersed tubes
Name	Image	Length	Depth (Note: At bottom of tunnel structure)	Width	Completed	Location	Notes & refs.
Fehmarn Belt Fixed Link		17.6 km 10.9 mi	40 m 130 ft	42 m 138 ft	2028 (est.)	Fehmarn Belt in Denmark and Germany	
Shenzhen–Zhongshan Bridge		6.845 km 4.253 mi	38 m 125 ft	46 m 151 ft	2024	Shenzhen and Zhongshan, China	Immersed length 5.035 km (3.129 mi).
Hong Kong–Zhuhai–Macau Bridge		6.75 km 4.19 mi	30.18 m 99.0 ft	37.95 m 124.5 ft	2010	Pearl River estuary in Hong Kong; Macau; and Zhuhai, China	
Transbay Tube		5.825 km 3.619 mi	40.5 m 133 ft	14.58 m 47 ft 10 in	1969	San Francisco Bay, United States	
Drogdentunnelen		3.51 km 2.18 mi	22 m 72 ft	42 m 138 ft	2000	Öresund/Øresund between Sweden and Denmark	Four bores: 2×2-lane & 2×1-track
Busan–Geoje Fixed Link		3.24 km 2.01 mi	38 m 125 ft	26.46 m 86.8 ft	2010	Busan and Geoje Island, South Korea	
Pulau Seraya Utility Tunnel		2.6 km 1.6 mi		6.5 m 21 ft	1988	Singapore	
Raúl Uranga – Carlos Sylvestre Begnis Subfluvial Tunnel		2.367 km 1.471 mi	32 m 105 ft	10.8 m 35 ft	1969	Entre Ríos Province and Santa Fe Province, Argentina	
Hampton Roads Bridge–Tunnel (Tube 2)		2.229 km 1.385 mi	37 m 121 ft	12 m 39 ft	1976	Hampton Roads, Virginia, United States	
Tuas Bay Cable Tunnel		2.1 km 1.3 mi		11.8 m 39 ft	1999	Singapore	
Hampton Roads Bridge–Tunnel (Tube 1)		2.091 km 1.299 mi	21 m 70 ft	11 m 37 ft	1957	Hampton Roads, Virginia, United States	
Blayais Nuclear Power Plant Outfall		1.935 km 1.202 mi			1978	Blaye, France	
Baltimore Harbor Tunnel		1.92 km 1.19 mi	30 m 98 ft	21.3 m 70 ft	1957	Baltimore, Maryland, United States	
Eastern Harbour Crossing		1.859 km 1.155 mi	27 m 89 ft	35 m 115 ft	1990	Victoria Harbour, Hong Kong	
Rotterdam Metro (Lines D/E, Nieuwe Maas crossing)		1.815 km 1.128 mi		10 m 33 ft	1966	Rotterdam, Netherlands	Immersed length 1.04 km (0.65 mi); total length 1.815 km (1.128 mi) between stations.
Chesapeake Bay Bridge–Tunnel		1.75 km 1.09 mi		11.3 m 37 ft	1964	Chesapeake Bay, Virginia, United States	
Fort McHenry Tunnel		1.646 km 1.023 mi	31.7 m 104 ft	25.1 m 82 ft	1987	Baltimore, Maryland, United States	
Cross-Harbour Tunnel		1.6 km 0.99 mi	28 m 92 ft	22.16 m 72.7 ft	1972	Victoria Harbour, Hong Kong	
Tamagawa Tunnel		1.550 km 0.963 mi	30 m 98 ft	39.7 m 130 ft	1994	Tokyo, Japan	
Hemspoor Tunnel		1.475 km 0.917 mi	26 m 85 ft	21.5 m 71 ft	1980	Amsterdam	
Monitor–Merrimac Memorial Bridge–Tunnel		1.425 km 0.885 mi	36 m 118 ft	24 m 79 ft	1992	Hampton Roads, Virginia, United States	
Louis-Hippolyte Lafontaine Bridge–Tunnel		1.391 km 0.864 mi	24 m 79 ft	37 m 121 ft	1967	Montréal, Québec, Canada	
Marmaray Tunnel		1.387 km 0.862 mi	60.5 m 198 ft	15.3 m 50 ft	2013	Bosporus, Istanbul, Turkey	1.4 km (0.87 mi) immersed tube + 9.8 km (6.1 mi) bored tunnel + 2.4 km (1.5 mi) cut-and-cover
Drechttunnel		0.569 km 0.354 mi	23 m 75 ft	49 m 161 ft	1977	Dordrecht and Zwijndrecht, The Netherlands	

== See also ==
- Submerged floating tunnel
