= Lingdingyang Bridge =

Bridge in china

The Lingdingyang Bridge (traditional Chinese: 伶仃洋大橋; simplified Chinese: 伶仃洋大桥; pinyin: Língdīngyáng Dàqiáo; Cantonese Yale: ling4 ding1 yeung4 daai6 kiu4) is a proposed bridge crossing the Lingdingyang, Pearl River estuary between the Chinese cities of Shenzhen and Zhuhai in Guangdong province.

The bridge was originally proposed by the former Zhuhai prefecture mayor in the late 1980s as a link between Zhuhai and Hong Kong, with landing points at Qi'ao Island and Tuen Mun of the respective cities. The Qi'ao Bridge was completed in 1998 to link mainland Zhuhai with Qi'ao Island as part of the preliminary work for the proposed Lingdingyang bridge. Nonetheless the proposal was dropped to give way to the later-proposed Hong Kong-Zhuhai-Macau Bridge, which links Hong Kong at Lantau and Zhuhai at Gongbei, with a connection to Macau as well.

In November 2019, Zhuhai government announced plans for a Shenzhen-Zhuhai bridge, officially named the Lingdingyang Bridge. The bridge will start in Qianhai, Shenzhen and go towards Qi'ao Island, Zhuhai, and will be 47 kilometers (29 mi) long. The cross-sea section of the bridge is planned to be both an expressway and a railway. A two-way eight-lane expressway and a four-lane railway with a designed speed of 100 kilometers per hour (62 mph) have been planned.

== See also ==
- Shenzhen–Zhongshan Link
