= SZB =

SZB may refer to:

- SZB, the IATA code for Sultan Abdul Aziz Shah Airport, Subang, Selangor, Malaysia
- Shenzhen–Zhongshan Bridge, an upcoming bridge connecting Shenzhen with Zhongshan on the Pearl River Delta in China
