= Tokyo Bay Aqua-Line =

Bridge–tunnel in Japan

Tokyo Wan Aqua-Line Expressway
- 東京湾アクアライン
- The Tokyo Bay Aqua-Line highlighted in red

Route information
- Length: 23.7 km (14.7 mi)
- Existed: 1997–present
- Component highways: National Route 409

Major junctions
- West end: Kawasaki Ukishima Junction; Shuto Expressway Bayshore Route in Kawasaki, Kanagawa

Section 1
- East end: Kisarazu Interchange; Ken-Ō Expressway in Kisarazu, Chiba

Location
- Country: Japan

Highway system
- National highways of Japan; Expressways of Japan

Tokyo Bay Aqua-Line 東京湾アクアライン
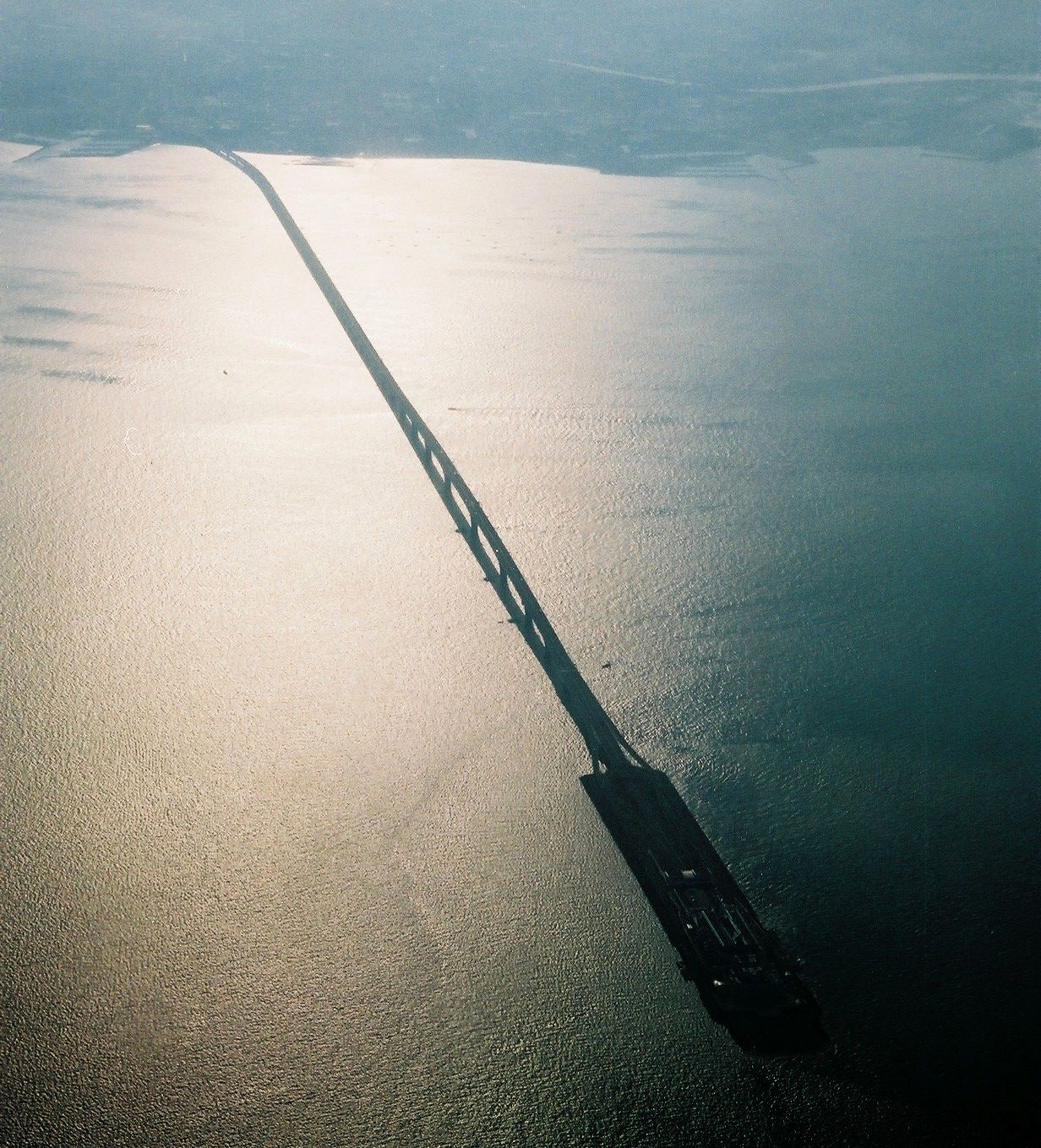
- Tokyo Bay Aqua-Line (bridge section)
- Coordinates: 35°27′47″N 139°52′31″E
- Carries: 4 lanes of National Route 409
- Crosses: Tokyo Bay
- Locale: Kisarazu, Chiba; and Umihotaru Island
- Other name: Trans-Tokyo Bay Highway

Characteristics
- Design: Steel box girder bridge with orthotropic deck; Bored shield tunnel; Artificial islands
- Total length: bridge: 4,384 metres (14,383 ft); tunnel: 9,600 metres (31,496 ft)
- Width: 22.9 metres (75 ft)
- Longest span: 240 metres (787 ft)
- Piers in water: 42
- Clearance below: 29 metres (95 ft)

History
- Fabrication by: bridge: Yokogawa Bridge Corp. and JFE Engineering; tunnel:
- Construction start: 1989
- Construction cost: ¥1.4 trillion
- Opened: 18 December 1997

Location
- Interactive map of Tokyo Bay Aqua-Line

Tokyo Bay Tunnel
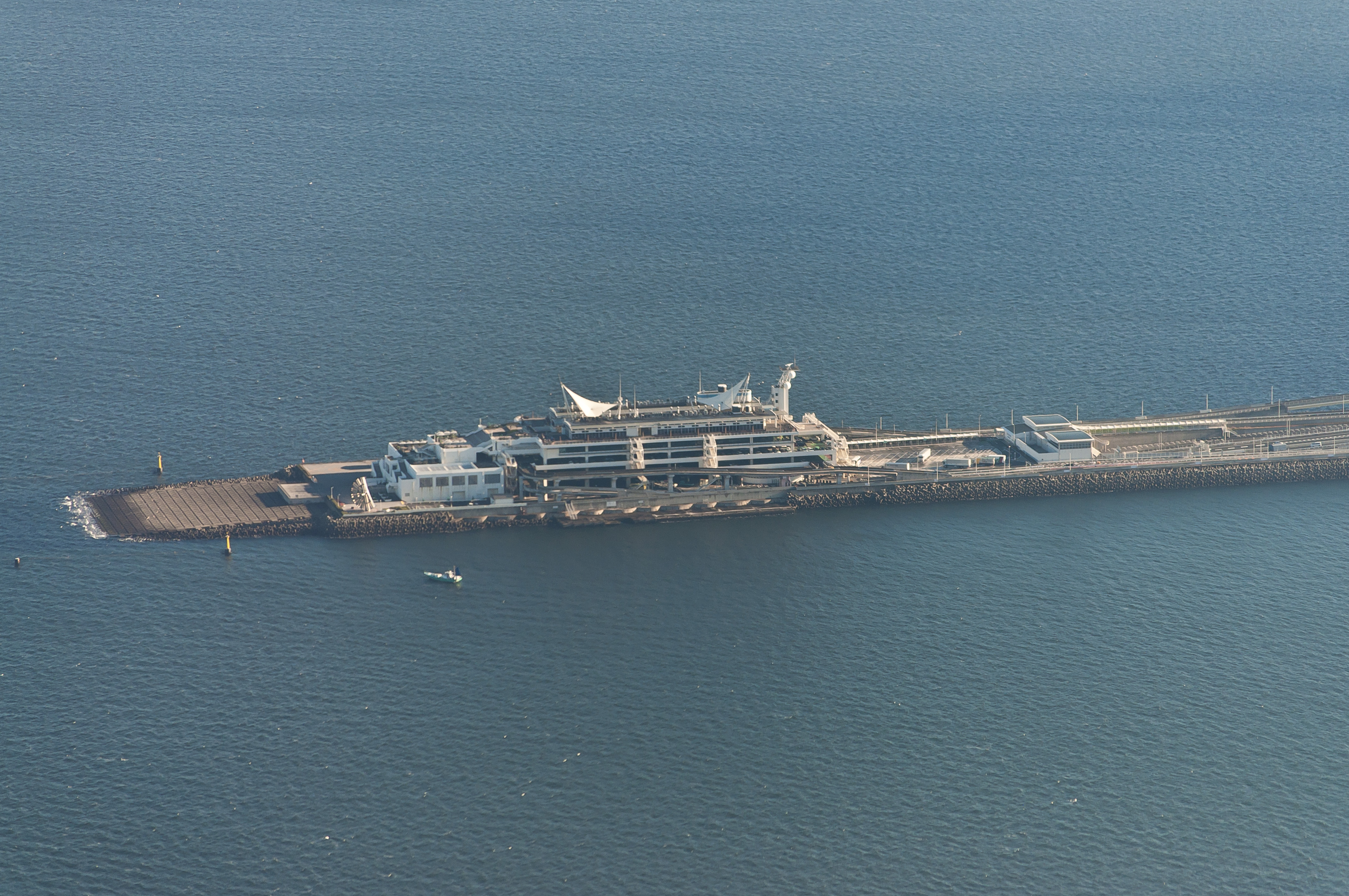
- Umihotaru, where bridge transitions to tunnel
- Interactive map of Tokyo Bay Tunnel

Overview
- Status: 2 in use; 1 planned
- Start: Umihotaru Island
- End: Ukishima, Kawasaki, Kanagawa

Operation
- Constructed: Taisei

Technical
- No. of lanes: 2 (unidirectional) in each of 2 tunnels
- Max elevation: sea level
- Min elevation: −45 metres (−148 ft)
- Width: 14.1 metres (46 ft) OD; 11.9 metres (39 ft) ID; 10.5 metres (34 ft) roadway
- Grade: 4%

The Tokyo Bay Aqua-Line (東京湾アクアライン, Tōkyō-wan Akua-rain), also known as the Trans-Tokyo Bay Expressway, is an expressway that is mainly made up of a bridge–tunnel combination across Tokyo Bay in Japan. It connects the city of Kawasaki in Kanagawa Prefecture with the city of Kisarazu in Chiba Prefecture, and forms part of National Route 409. With an overall length of 23.7 km, it includes a 4.4 km bridge and 9.6 km tunnel underneath the bay—the fourth-longest underwater tunnel in the world.

== Overview ==
An artificial island, Umihotaru (海ほたる, Umi-hotaru; "sea firefly," referring to Vargula hilgendorfii), marks the transition between the bridge and tunnel segments and provides a rest stop with restaurants, shops, and amusement facilities. A distinctive tower standing above the middle of the tunnel, the Kaze no Tō (風の塔, "the tower of wind"), supplies air to the tunnel, its ventilation system powered by the bay's almost-constant winds.

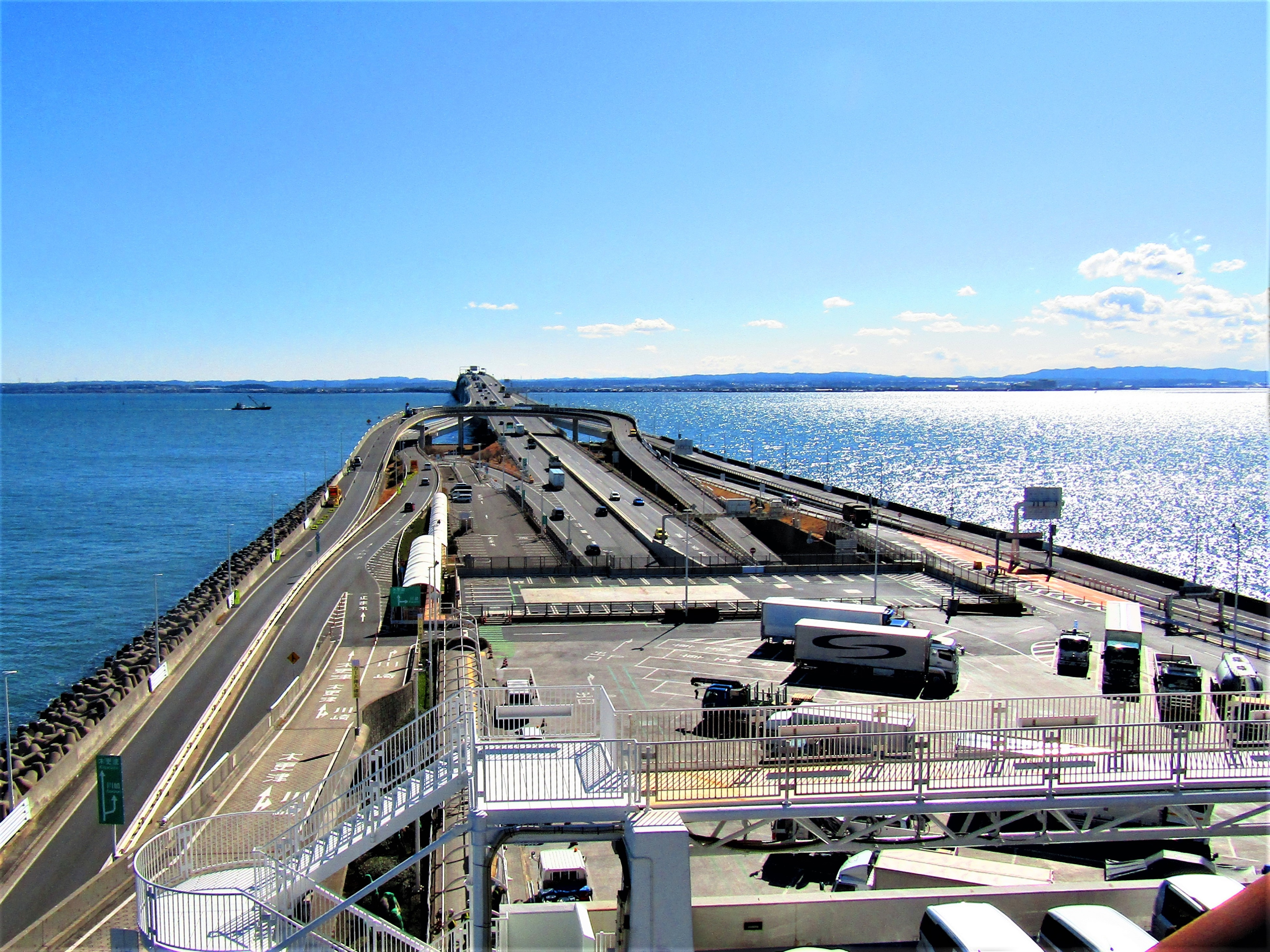
Tokyo Wan Aqua-Line.

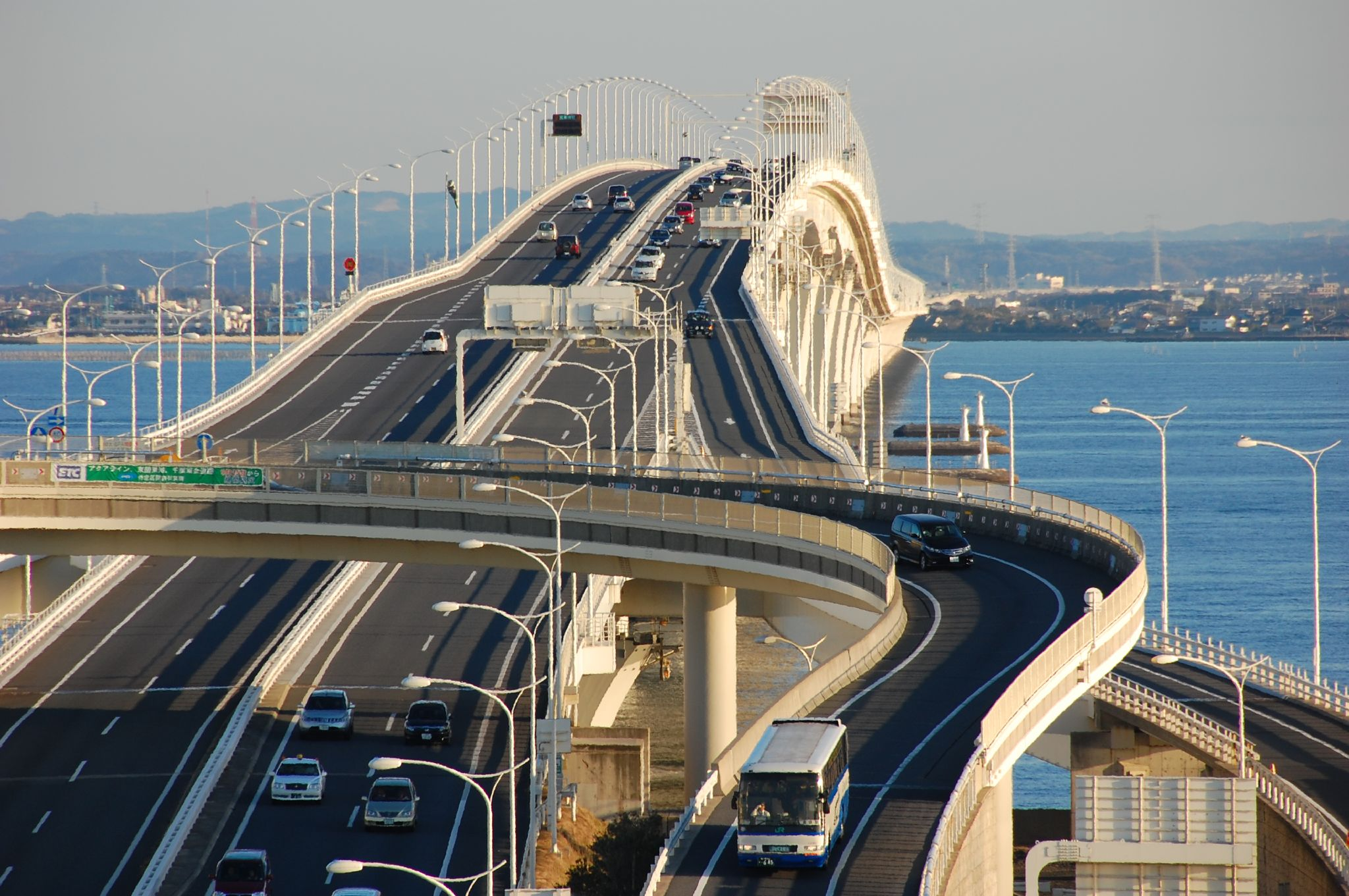
Tokyo Bay Aqua-Line bridge.

The Tokyo Bay Aqua-Line shortened the drive between Chiba and Kanagawa, two important industrial areas, from 90 to 15 minutes, and also helped cut travel time from Tokyo and Kanagawa to the seaside leisure spots of the southern Bōsō Peninsula. Before it opened, the trip entailed a 100 km journey along Tokyo Bay and pass through central Tokyo.

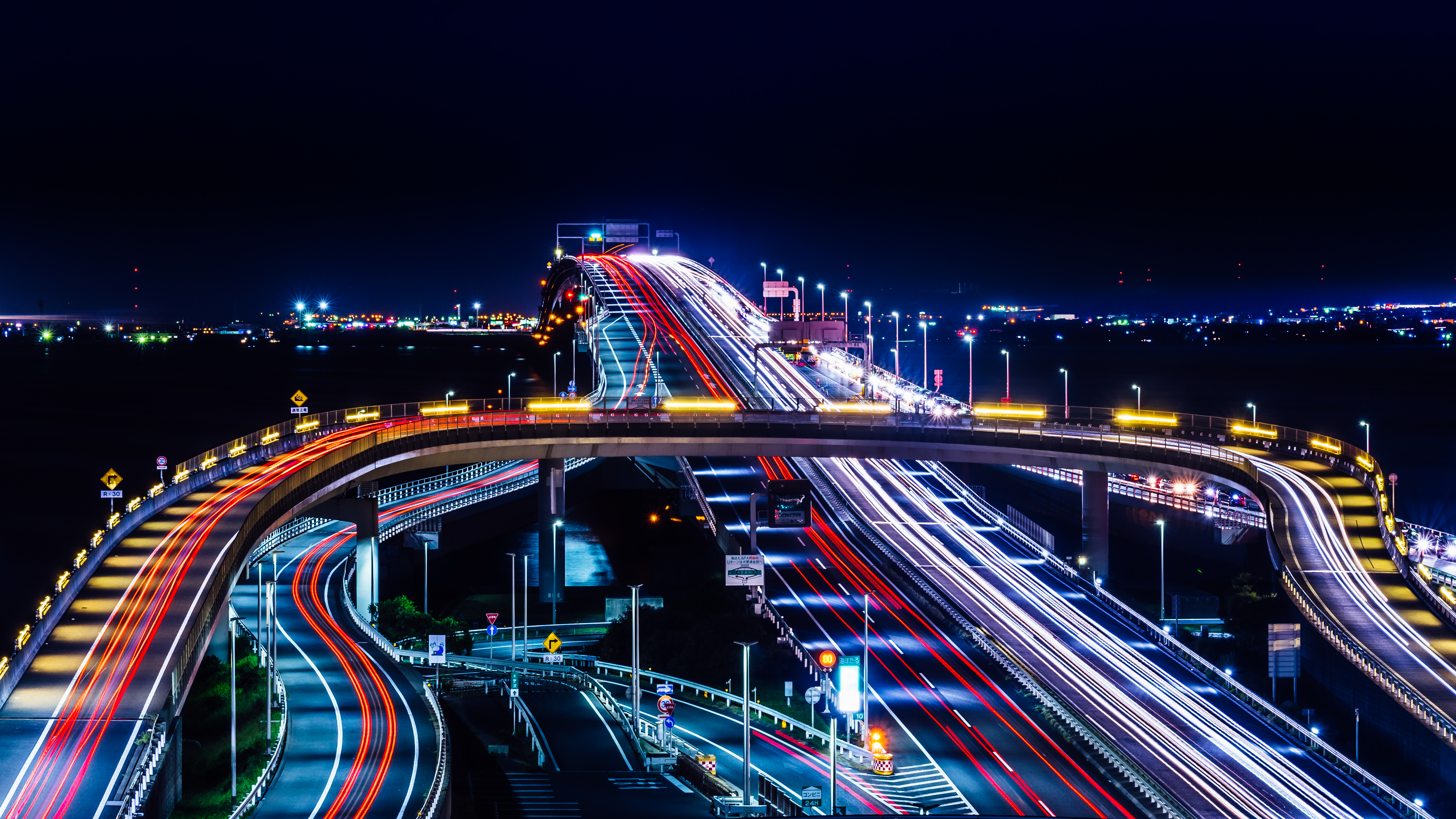
Tokyo Bay Aqua-Line Highway at night.

An explicit goal of the Aqua-Line was to redirect vehicular flow away from central Tokyo, but the expensive toll has meant only a limited reduction in central-Tokyo traffic.

Many highway bus services now use the Tokyo Bay Aqua-Line, including lines from Tokyo Station, Yokohama Station, Kawasaki Station, Shinagawa Station, Shibuya Station, Shinjuku Station and Haneda Airport to Kisarazu, Kimitsu, Nagaura station, Ichihara, Mobara, Tōgane, Kamogawa, Katsuura and Tateyama.

== History ==
One of the last Japanese megaprojects of the 20th century, the roadway was built at a cost of ¥1.44 trillion (US$11.2 billion) and opened on December 18, 1997 by then-Crown Prince Naruhito and then-Crown Princess Masako after 23 years of planning and nine years of construction. The roadway was conceived during the bubble economy of the late 1980s.

At opening time, the roadway had the highest toll fee in Japan – a one-way trip was ¥5050, or ¥334 per kilometer. Due to its expensive toll, analysts see lower traffic volume than what Japan Highway Public Corporation, the operator of the roadway, expected at 25,000 cars.

The Aqua-Line is a popular spot for illegal street racing, although stricter law enforcement including speed cameras has cut down on this.

== Tolls ==
The cash toll for a single trip on the Aqua-Line is ¥3,140 for ordinary-size cars (¥2,510 for kei cars); however, using the ETC (electronic toll collection) system, the fare is ¥2320 (¥1860 for kei cars). The ETC toll is reduced to ¥1000 on Saturdays, Sundays and holidays. In general, tolls for usage of the Aqua-Line in either direction are collected at the mainline toll plaza on the Kisarazu end.

Toll table of Tokyo-bay Aqua Line (Kawasaki-Ukishima Junction – Kisarazu-Kaneda Interchange)
| Type of car | Toll | ETC Aqua-Line Special discount | ETC Pilot Test discount (from July 2009) |
|---|---|---|---|
| Normal cars | 3,140JPY | 2,320JPY | 800JPY |
| Midsize cars | 3,770JPY | 2,780JPY | 960JPY |
| Large cars | 5,190JPY | 3,830JPY | 1,320JPY |
| Specific large cars | 8,640JPY | 6,380JPY | 2,200JPY |
| Kei-cars and motorcycles | 2,510JPY | 1,860JPY | 640JPY |

== See also ==
- List of bridge–tunnels
- Chesapeake Bay Bridge–Tunnel
- Busan–Geoje Fixed Link
- Hong Kong–Zhuhai–Macau Bridge
- Bataan–Cavite Interlink Bridge
