= Busan–Geoje Bridge =

Fixed link in southern South Korea

Busan–Geoje Fixed Link
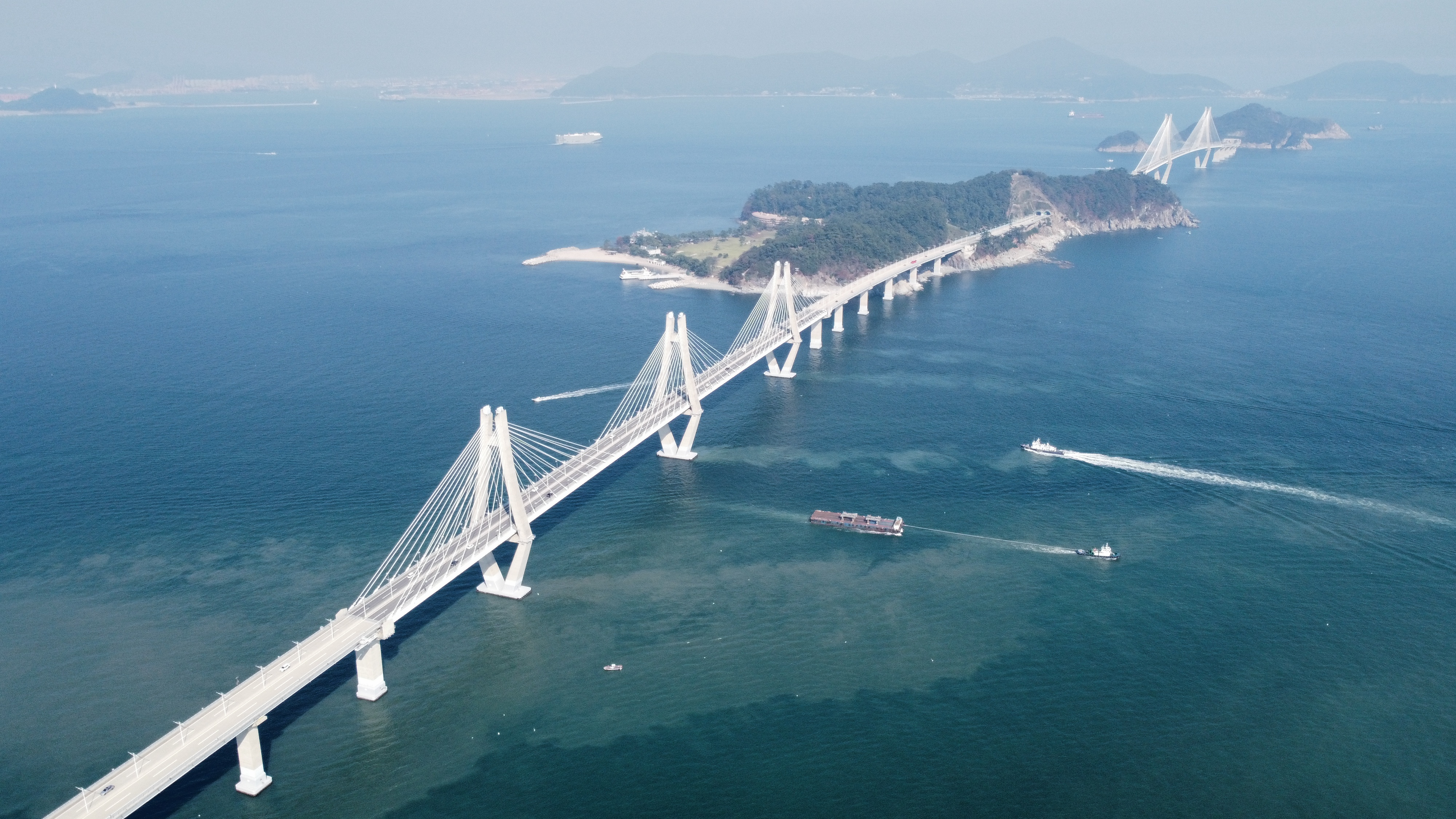
- Coordinates: 35°0′57.2″N 128°44′39″E
- Carries: National Route 58 (South Korea)
- Locale: Busan, South Korea

Characteristics
- Design: Fixed link (bridge-tunnel)
- Total length: 8.2 kilometers (5.1 mi)
- Longest span: 475 meters (1,558 ft)

Location
- Interactive map of Busan–Geoje Fixed Link

The Busan–Geoje Fixed Link or Geoga Bridge (Korean: 거가대교) is an 8.2-kilometer (5.1-mi) bridge-tunnel fixed link that connects the South Korean city of Busan to Geoje Island. The route opened on December 13, 2010 and shortens the travelling distance between Geoje Island and Busan by about 60 kilometers (37 mi). The new road has two lanes in each direction and carries National Road 58.

The fixed link opens Geoje Island to tourist-related development and saves US$300 million in costs related to traffic delays from the longer route.

== Design and construction ==
The bridge was built under a public-private partnership. GK Fixed Link Corp, a consortium of seven Korean contractors, has a 40-year contract to build, operate and transfer the fixed link. The project is planned to cost US$1.8 billion. The government has provided only one-fourth of the cost; the rest is financed by the consortium to be repaid by tolls during the life of the contract. The lead contractor in the consortium is Daewoo Engineering & Construction, Co.

Designers involved with the project include COWI A/S (Denmark), Halcrow Group (United Kingdom), Tunnel Engineering Consultants (Netherlands), Pihl and Son (Denmark), Arcadis US (USA), and Ben C. Gerwick (USA).

== Route ==
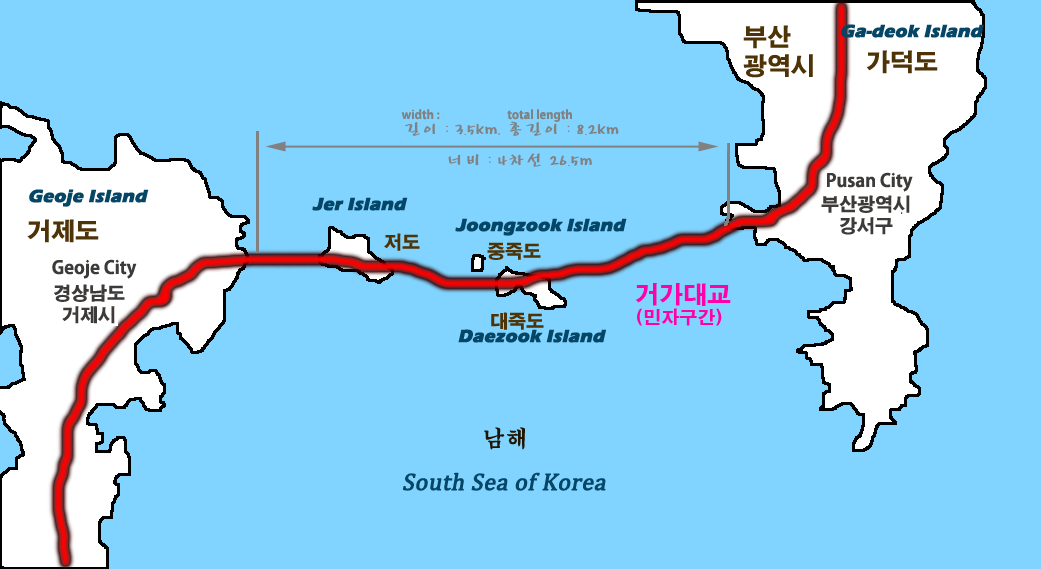
Map of Busan–Geoje Fixed Link

The route connects Busan, Korea's largest port city, to the shipbuilding industries and tourism destinations on Geoje Island. It replaces either a 210-minute journey by road or a 120-minute journey by ferry. The new route cuts travel time down to 40 minutes.

The fixed link starts on Geoje Island, crosses three islets (Jeo, Jungjuk and Daejuk) and ends on Gaduk Island. In addition to the tunnel between Daejuk and Gaduk islands, a bridge is used to cross each of the islets.

== Bridge 1 ==
The 1.87 km (1.16 mi) bridge between Jungjuk and Jeo islands includes a cable-stayed bridge with a 475 m (1,558 ft) main span and 220 m (720 ft) side spans. This bridge provides 52 meters (171 ft) of navigational clearance and has two 156 m (512 ft) diamond-shaped pylons.

== Bridge 2 ==
Between Geoje and Jeo islands, a 1.65 km (1.03 mi) bridge includes a three-pylon cable-stay bridge. This bridge has two mainspans of 230 meters (750 ft) with side spans of 106 meters (348 ft). The pylons are 102 meters (335 ft) tall and there is 36 meters (118 ft) of clearance underneath the bridge.

== Tunnel ==
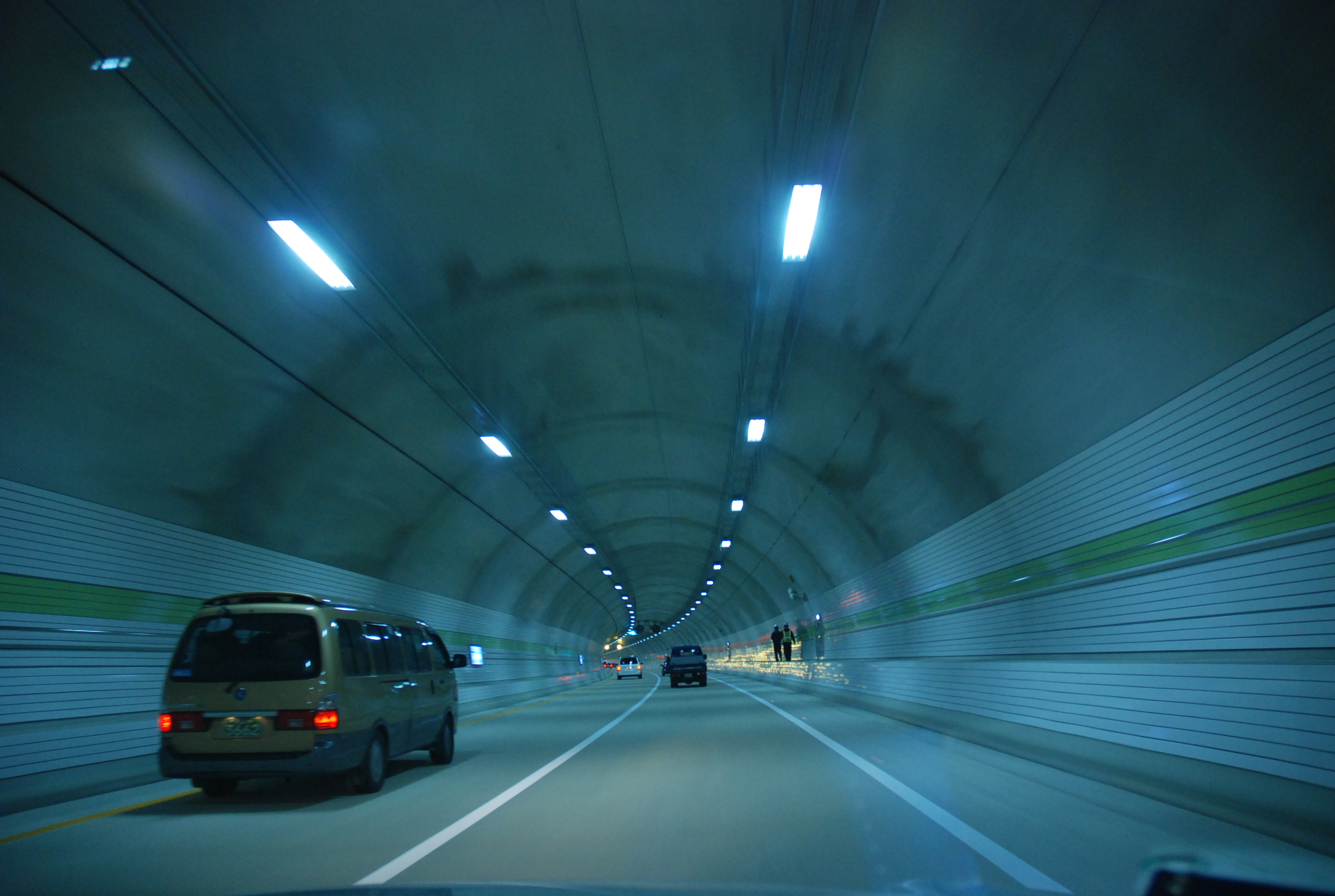
The tunnel in December 2010

When it opened, the tunnel became the world's deepest immersed roadway tunnel (48 meters (157 ft) below mean water level) and the world's fifth-longest concrete immersed tunnel, at 3.2 kilometers (2.0 mi). It is Korea's first immersed tunnel. It became the second-deepest immersed vehicle tunnel after completion of the Marmaray (Bosphorus rail tunnel) in 2013.

The tunnel is made up of 180 m (590 ft) segments constructed in a dry dock in Anjeon. Each segment was towed 35 kilometers (22 mi) by barges and sunk into place.

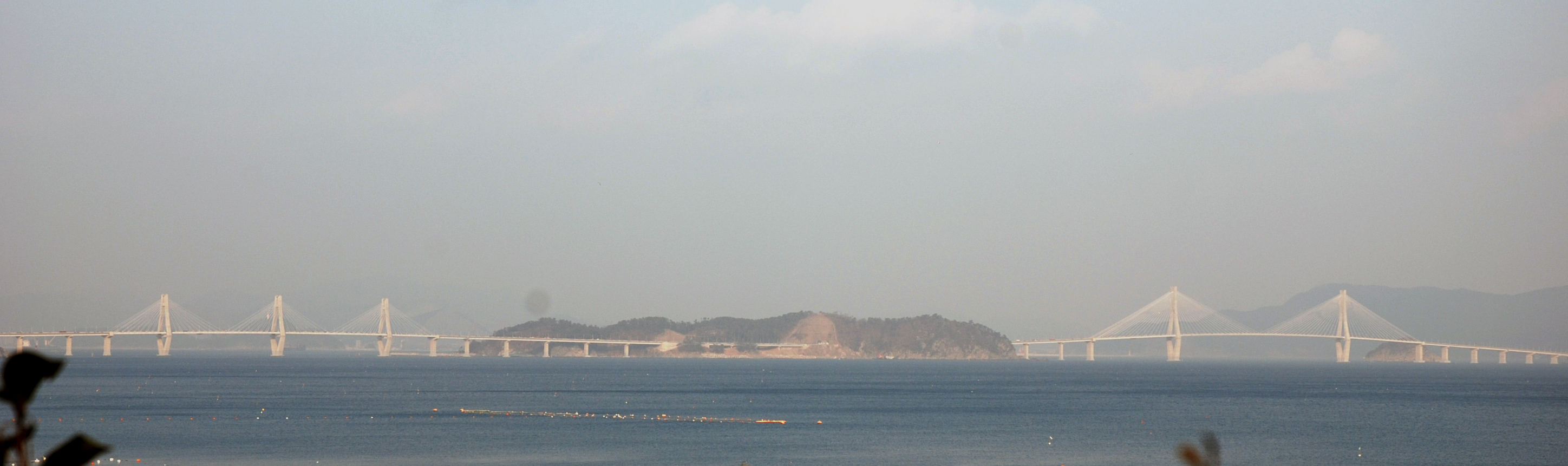
Busan–Geoje Fixed Link

== Toll ==
(Since 2011)

Vehicle type	Toll (in South Korean Won)
Light car	5,000
Small car	10,000
Medium car	15,000
Large car	25,000
Biggest car	30,000

== See also ==
- Transportation in South Korea
- List of bridges in South Korea
- List of bridge–tunnels
- Lists of tunnels
- Øresund Bridge
- Tokyo Bay Aqua-Line
- Undersea tunnel

== Notes and references ==
- Cho, Aileen (February 2, 2009). "A Sinking Feeling Is Good in Busan, For Contractors and Their Advisors". Engineering News-Record. 262 (4). New York: McGraw-Hill: 24–29. ISSN 0891-9526. Archived from the original on May 26, 2011.
- Fraser, Don (May 25, 2008). "Vision On". Bridge Design & Engineering (51). London: Hemming Information Services. Archived from the original on September 24, 2010.
- Halcrow Group Limited. "Busan Geoje Fixed Link Project". Archived from the original on February 14, 2009.
- Halcrow Group Limited. Busan Geoje Fixed Link. Halcrow Group Limited. Archived from the original (wmv) on October 10, 2009.
- Rowson, Jessica (January 13, 2009). "Korea crossing - Busan Geoje link". New Civil Engineer. London: Emap. Archived from the original on May 1, 2009.
- Yeoward, Andrew J.; Fraser, Don; Koo, Im Sig; Davis, Daniel G. (September 2010). "Land Locking: South Korean Islands Linked by Mammoth Job" (PDF). Roads & Bridges Magazine. 48 (9). Scranton Gillette Communications: 26–29. Archived from the original (PDF) on July 15, 2011.
