= Qi'ao Bridge =

Qi'ao Bridge 淇澳大桥
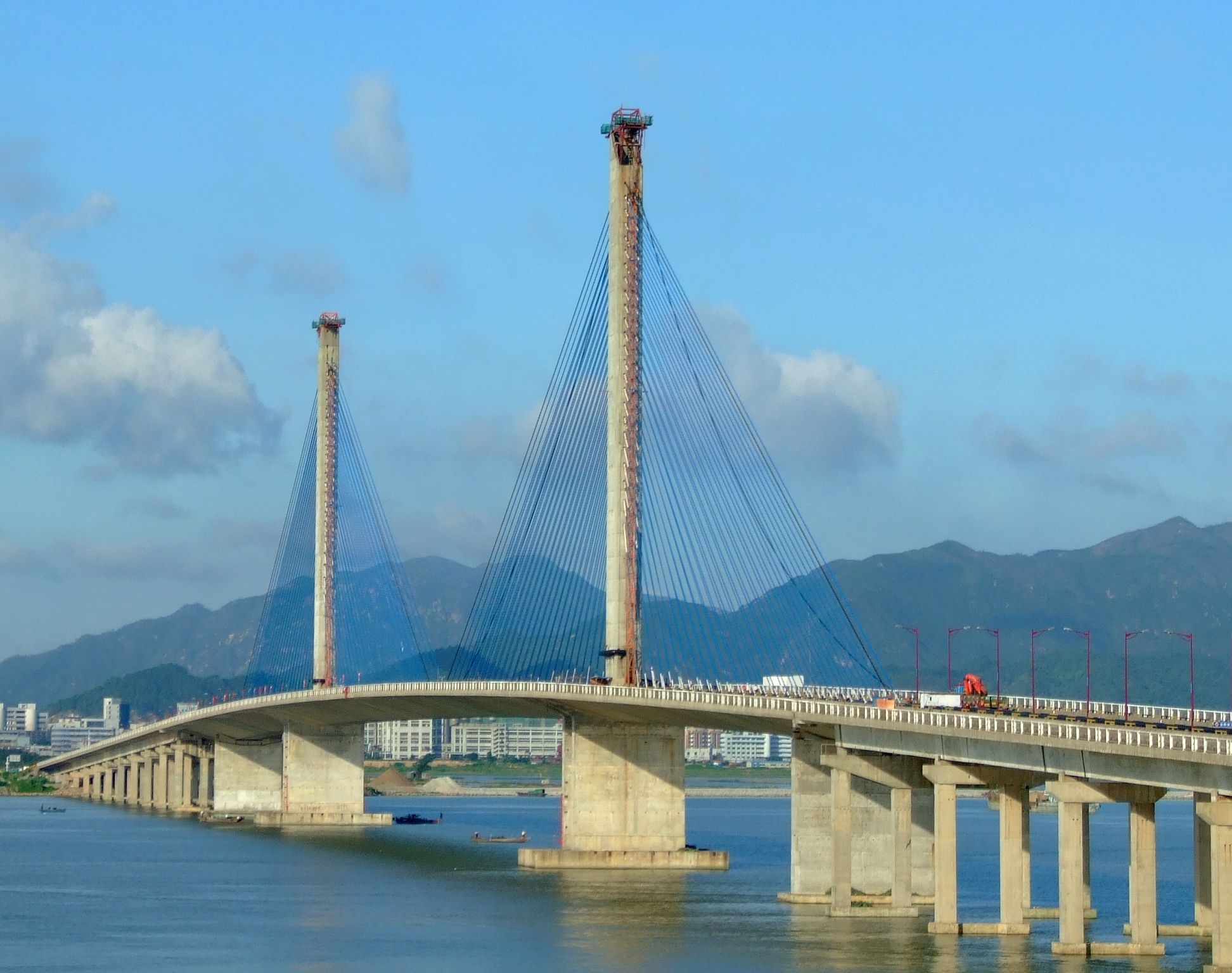
- Coordinates: 22.38775°N 113.610806°E
- Crosses: Pearl River
- Locale: Zhuhai, Guangdong, China

Characteristics
- Design: Cable-stayed bridge
- Total length: 1,400 metres (4,593 ft)
- Longest span: 320 metres (1,050 ft)

History
- Opened: 1998

Location
- Interactive map of Qi'ao Bridge

The Qi'ao Bridge is a cable stayed bridge located in Zhuhai, Guangdong Province, China. Opened in 1998, the bridge spans 320 metres (1,050 ft) over the Pearl River to Qi'ao Island.

The bridge was intended as part of a proposed road link between Zhuhai and Hong Kong under the name Lingdingyang Bridge. However, the full scheme of the Zhuhai–Hong Kong link had not been approved by either the Chinese or Hong Kong governments at the time, and the project was later shelved in favor of the Hong Kong–Zhuhai–Macau Bridge.
