= Bridge and tunnel (disambiguation) =

Bridge and tunnel describes a person who commutes by these modes.

Bridge and Tunnel may also refer to:

- Bridge–tunnel, a persistent, unbroken road or rail connection across water
- "Bridge and Tunnel" (Agent Carter), an episode of the American television series Agent Carter
- Bridge and Tunnel (band), an American punk band
- Bridge and Tunnel (film), a 2014 American comedy-drama film
- Bridge and Tunnel (play), a 2004 one-woman Broadway show
- Bridge and Tunnel (TV series), a 2021 American television series
- Bridge and Tunnel Productions, a film company founded by Tina Gharavi
