= Shenzhen–Zhongshan Link =

Shenzhen–Zhongshan Link 深中通道
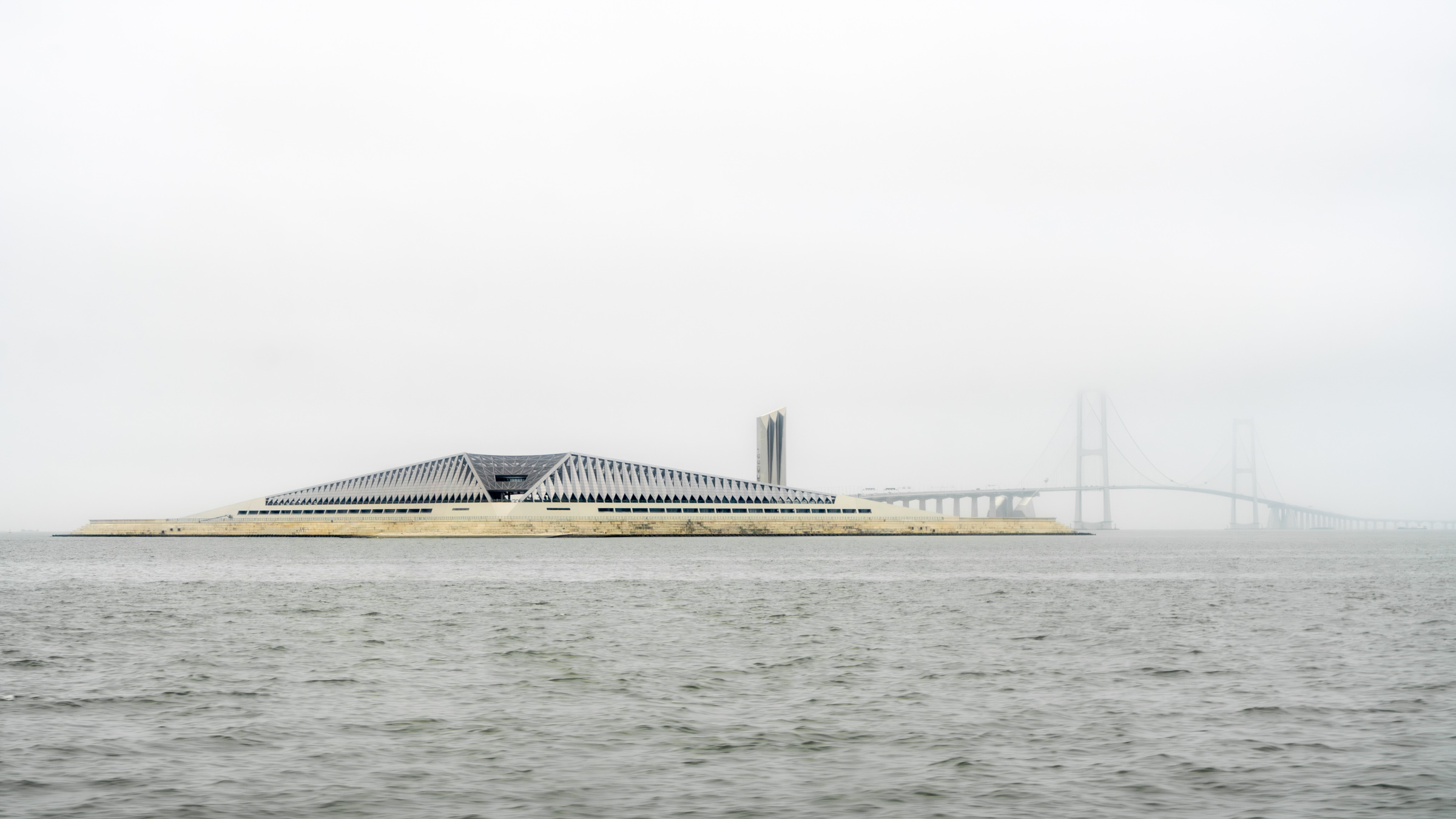
- Coordinates: 22°34′N 113°45′E
- Carries: 8 lanes of the G2518 Shenzhen–Cenxi Expressway
- Crosses: Pearl River Estuary; Lingding Channel; Jiuzhou Channel
- Locale: Pearl River Delta
- Official name: Shenzhen–Zhongshan Link
- Other name: Shenzhong Link

Characteristics
- Design: Bridge–tunnel system
- Total length: 49.7 kilometres (30.9 mi)
- No. of lanes: 4 lanes per direction

History
- Construction start: May 2017; 9 years ago
- Construction end: 2024; 2 years ago
- Construction cost: US$4.83 billion
- Opened: 30 June 2024; 2 years ago

Statistics
- Daily traffic: 100,000 vehicles

Location
- Interactive map of Shenzhen–Zhongshan Link

Shenzhen–Zhongshan Bridge 深中大桥
- Coordinates: 22°33′20″N 113°43′34″E
- Other name: Shenzhong Bridge

Characteristics
- Design: Suspension bridge
- Total length: 2,826 m (9,272 ft)
- Height: 270 m (890 ft)
- Longest span: 1,666 m (5,466 ft)

Zhongshan Bridge 中山大桥
- Coordinates: 22°33′20″N 113°37′51″E

Characteristics
- Design: Cable-stayed bridge
- Total length: 1,170 m (3,839 ft)
- Width: 45.94 m (151 ft)
- Height: 213.5 m (700 ft)
- Longest span: 580 m (1,903 ft)

Shenzhen–Zhongshan Link
- Traditional Chinese: 深中通道
- Simplified Chinese: 深中通道
- Hanyu Pinyin: Shēnzhōng Tōngdào
Transcriptions
Standard Mandarin
- Hanyu Pinyin: Shēnzhōng Tōngdào

The Shenzhen–Zhongshan Link is a bridge–tunnel which connects two major cities on the Pearl River Delta (PRD) in China: the city of Shenzhen on the eastern side of the PRD, and the city of Zhongshan on the western side. It consists of a series of bridges and tunnels (Shenzhen–Zhongshan Tunnel, Shenzhen–Zhongshan Bridge and Zhongshan Bridge), starting from Bao'an International Airport on the Shenzhen side.

The 49.7 km eight-lane link was expected to cost around US$4.83 billion at the time of its proposal. It is located about 27 km downriver from the Humen Bridge, previously the only bridge crossing of the estuary, and some 32 km north of the new Hong Kong–Zhuhai–Macau Bridge, which links the cities of Hong Kong, Zhuhai, and Macau at the southern end of the PRD. Construction started in May 2017 and opened on 30 June 2024.

== History ==
Bridge construction site, from May 2018 till June 2021

Shenzhen lobbied hard in the early 2000s to be included in the Hong Kong–Zhuhai–Macau Bridge project through a proposed double-Y-shaped design with one of the extensions connecting Shenzhen to the structure, but the Government of China picked a single-Y-shaped design in 2004, leaving Shenzhen out of the project. The idea of a separate link to connect Shenzhen with Zhongshan was originally proposed in 2008, but was shelved for several years amid concerns it could jeopardize the success of a bridge between Hong Kong, Zhuhai and Macau. It was eventually included in the Guangdong government's 12th five-year plan, unveiled by Guangdong governor Huang Huahua on 9 January 2011.

The project consists of a 6.7 km tunnel starting on the Shenzhen side, and 19 bridges totaling 43 km (aggregate length); the longest continuous section of bridge is about 22.5 km, from which about 15.5 km stretches above sea. There are four lanes in each direction, with a maximum speed of 100 km/h. The bridge joins the Guangshen Expressway to the south of Shenzhen airport and the Jihe Expressway to the east of the airport on the eastern side of the delta with the Zhongjiang Expressway on the western side. It cut travel time from Shenzhen to Zhongshan to less than 30 minutes.

On 30 June 2024, the bridge opened to traffic. Shenzhen created inter-city bus lines between it and Zhongshan. In the first days after opening, users including drivers and passengers reported congestion on the bridge, some had to wait hours or made detours using the Humen Bridge instead.

== Usage ==
In the first month after its opening, there were over 3 million vehicle crossings.

== See also ==
- List of bridges in China
- Humen Pearl River Bridge
- Lingdingyang Bridge
