= Jiuzhouyang =

- Chinese: 九洲洋
- Literal meaning: nine isles' ocean
Transcriptions
Standard Mandarin
- Hanyu Pinyin: Jiǔzhōuyáng
Yue: Cantonese
- Yale Romanization: Gáujāu Yèuhng
- Jyutping: gau2 zau1 joeng4

Jiuzhouyang (Chinese: 九洲洋) or Jiuzhou Channel is the lower channel of the Pearl River estuary which runs from Lingdingyang all the way to the southern end of the Wanshan Archipelago. At the eastern tip of Taipa, from the western tip of Lantau separates Jiuzhouyang from Lingdingyang the mid channel. Currently, no bridge or tunnel that crosses Jiuzhouyang with only Humen Pearl River Bridge (Shiziyang the upper channel) and Hong Kong–Zhuhai–Macau Bridge (Lingdingyang the mid channel) crosses Pearl River estuary.
