= Hong Kong–Zhuhai–Macau Bridge =

Fixed link consisting of tunnel and multiple bridges

Hong Kong–Zhuhai–Macau Bridge 港珠澳大橋 港珠澳大桥 Ponte de Hong Kong-Macau-Zhuhai
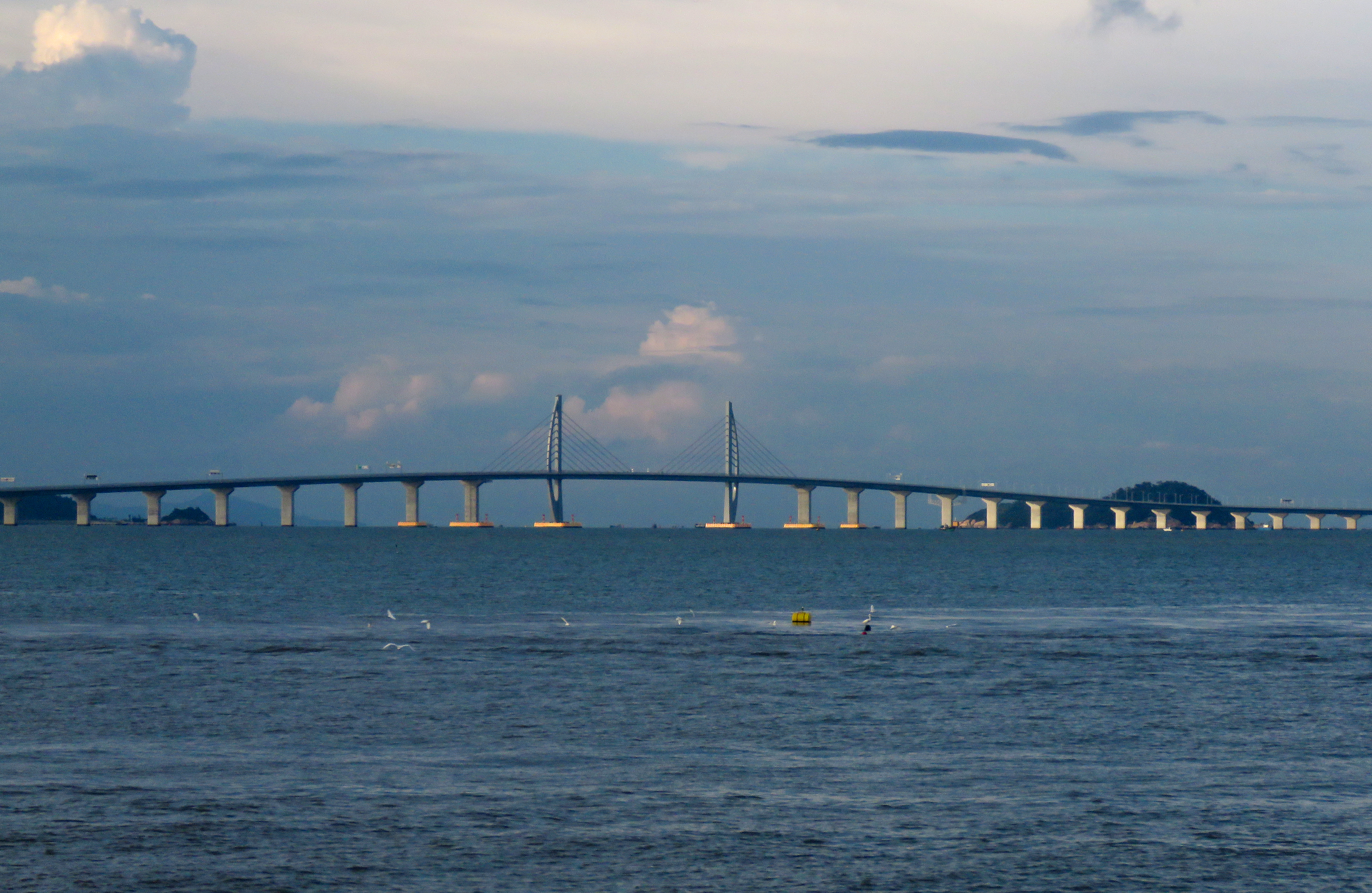
- View of the bridge facing northeast from a TurboJET vessel near Macau, 2018
- Coordinates: 22°16′59″N 113°46′50″E
- Carries: 6 lanes of the G94 Pearl River Delta Ring Expressway
- Crosses: Pearl River Estuary; Lingding Channel; Jiuzhou Channel
- Locale: Pearl River Delta
- Official name: Hong Kong-Zhuhai-Macao Bridge
- Other name(s): HZMB, HZM Bridge
- Maintained by: National Immigration Administration (mainland China); Immigration Department (Hong Kong); Public Security Police Force (Macau)

Characteristics
- Design: Bridge–tunnel system
- Total length: 55 kilometres (34 mi)
- No. of spans: 3
- No. of lanes: 3 lanes per direction
- Design life: 120 years

History
- Construction start: 15 December 2009; 16 years ago
- Construction end: 6 February 2018; 8 years ago
- Construction cost: ¥127 billion (US$18.8 billion)
- Opened: 24 October 2018, 09:00 UTC+8
- Inaugurated: 23 October 2018; 8 years ago

Statistics
- Daily traffic: 10,600 vehicles (2024 daily avg) (Note: Includes private vehicles, private coach and goods vehicles but not shuttle buses (Golden Buses)); 78,000 passenger trips (2024 daily avg)
- Toll: ¥80 - ¥300

Website
- hzmb.org (mainland China) customs.gov.cn (mainland China) hzmb.gov.hk (Hong Kong) td.gov.hk (Hong Kong) dsat.gov.mo/hzmb (Macau) fsm.gov.mo (Macau)

Location
- Interactive map of Hong Kong–Zhuhai–Macau Bridge

Hong Kong–Zhuhai–Macau Bridge
- Map of the bridge highway and the undersea tunnel (shown dotted) route of the Hong Kong–Zhuhai–Macau Bridge, between Hong Kong and Macau.

Chinese name
- Traditional Chinese: 港珠澳大橋
- Simplified Chinese: 港珠澳大桥
- Jyutping: gong2 zyu1 ou3 daai6 kiu4
- Hanyu Pinyin: Gǎngzhū'ào Dàqiáo
Transcriptions
Standard Mandarin
- Hanyu Pinyin: Gǎngzhū'ào Dàqiáo
- Bopomofo: ㄍㄤˇ ㄓㄨ ㄠˋ ㄉㄚˋ ㄑㄧㄠˊ
- Wade–Giles: Kang^{3}-chu^{1}-ao^{4} Ta^{4}-chʻiao^{2}
- Tongyong Pinyin: Gǎng-zhu-ào Dà-ciáo
- IPA: [kàŋ.ʈʂú.âʊ tâ.tɕʰjǎʊ]
Yue: Cantonese
- Yale Romanization: Góngjyūou Daaihkìuh
- Jyutping: gong2 zyu1 ou3 daai6 kiu4
- IPA: [kɔŋ˧˥ tsy˥ ɔw˧ taj˨]

Portuguese name
- Portuguese: Ponte Hong Kong–Zhuhai–Macau

The Hong Kong–Zhuhai–Macau Bridge (HZMB) is a 55-kilometre (34 mi) bridge–tunnel system consisting of a series of three cable-stayed bridges, an undersea tunnel, and four artificial islands. It is both the longest sea crossing and the longest open-sea fixed link in the world. The HZMB spans the Lingding and Jiuzhou channels, connecting Hong Kong and Macau with Zhuhai—a major city on the Pearl River Delta in China.

The HZM Bridge was designed to last for 120 years and cost ¥127 billion (US$18.8 billion) to build. The cost of constructing the Main Bridge was estimated at ¥51.1 billion (US$7.56 billion) funded by bank loans and shared among the governments of mainland China, Hong Kong and Macau.

Originally set to be opened to traffic in late 2016, the structure was completed on 6 February 2018 and journalists were subsequently taken for a ride over the bridge. On 24 October 2018 the HZMB was opened to the public after its inauguration a day earlier by the General Secretary of the Chinese Communist Party, Xi Jinping.

== Planning ==
=== Background ===
Hopewell Holdings founder and then-managing director Gordon Wu proposed the concept of a bridge-tunnel linking mainland China, British Hong Kong and Portuguese Macau in the 1980s. Wu stated that he got the idea in 1983 from the Chesapeake Bay Bridge–Tunnel. In 1988, Wu pitched the concept to Guangdong and Beijing officials. He envisaged a link farther north than the current design, beginning at Black Point near Tuen Mun, Hong Kong and crossing the Pearl River estuary via Nei Lingding Island and Qi'ao Island. His proposed bridge would have ended at the Chinese village of Tangjia, and a new road would have continued south through Zhuhai before terminating at Macau. Discussions stalled after the Tiananmen Square protests in mid-1989 "unnerved" Wu and other foreign investors, and caused Hopewell's Hong Kong share prices to plunge.

The route proposed by Wu was promoted by the Zhuhai government under the name Lingdingyang Bridge. In the mid-1990s, Zhuhai built a bridge between the Zhuhai mainland and Qi'ao Island that was intended as the first phase of this route, though the full scheme had not been approved by either the Chinese or Hong Kong governments at the time. China's central government showed support for this project on 30 December 1997. The new Hong Kong government was reluctant, stating that it was still awaiting cross-border traffic study results, and Hong Kong media questioned the environmental impact of the project with regard to air pollution, traffic and marine life.

In December 2001, the Legislative Council of Hong Kong passed a motion urging the Administration to develop the logistics industry including the construction of a bridge connecting Hong Kong, Zhuhai and Macao. In September 2002, the China/Hong Kong Conference on Co-ordination of Major Infrastructure Projects agreed to a joint study on a transport link between Hong Kong and Pearl River West.

=== Preparation ===
To coordinate the project, the Advance Work Coordination Group of HZMB was set up in 2003. Officials from three sides solved issues such as landing points and alignments of the bridge, operation of the Border Crossing Facilities, and project financing.

In August 2008, China's central government, the governments of Guangdong, Hong Kong and Macau agreed to finance 42 percent of the total costs. The remaining 58% consisted of loans (approximately ¥22 billion or US$3.23 billion) from the Bank of China.

In March 2009, it was further reported that China's central government, Hong Kong and Macau agreed to finance 22 percent of the total costs. The remaining 78 percent consisted of loans (approximately ¥57.3 billion or US$8.4 billion) from a consortium of banks led by Bank of China.

== Construction ==
Construction of the HZMB project began on 15 December 2009 on the Chinese side, with the CCP Politburo Standing member and Vice Premier of China Li Keqiang holding a commencement ceremony. Construction of the Hong Kong section of the project began in December 2011 after a delay caused by a legal challenge regarding the environmental impact of the bridge.

The last bridge tower was erected on 2 June 2016. The last straight element of the 4,860-metre-long (15,940 ft) straight section of the undersea tunnel was installed on 12 July 2016, and the final tunnel joint was installed on 2 May 2017. Construction of the Main Bridge, consisting of a viaduct and an undersea tunnel was completed on 6 July 2017. The entire construction project was completed on 6 February 2018. 19 workers died over the course of the construction period.

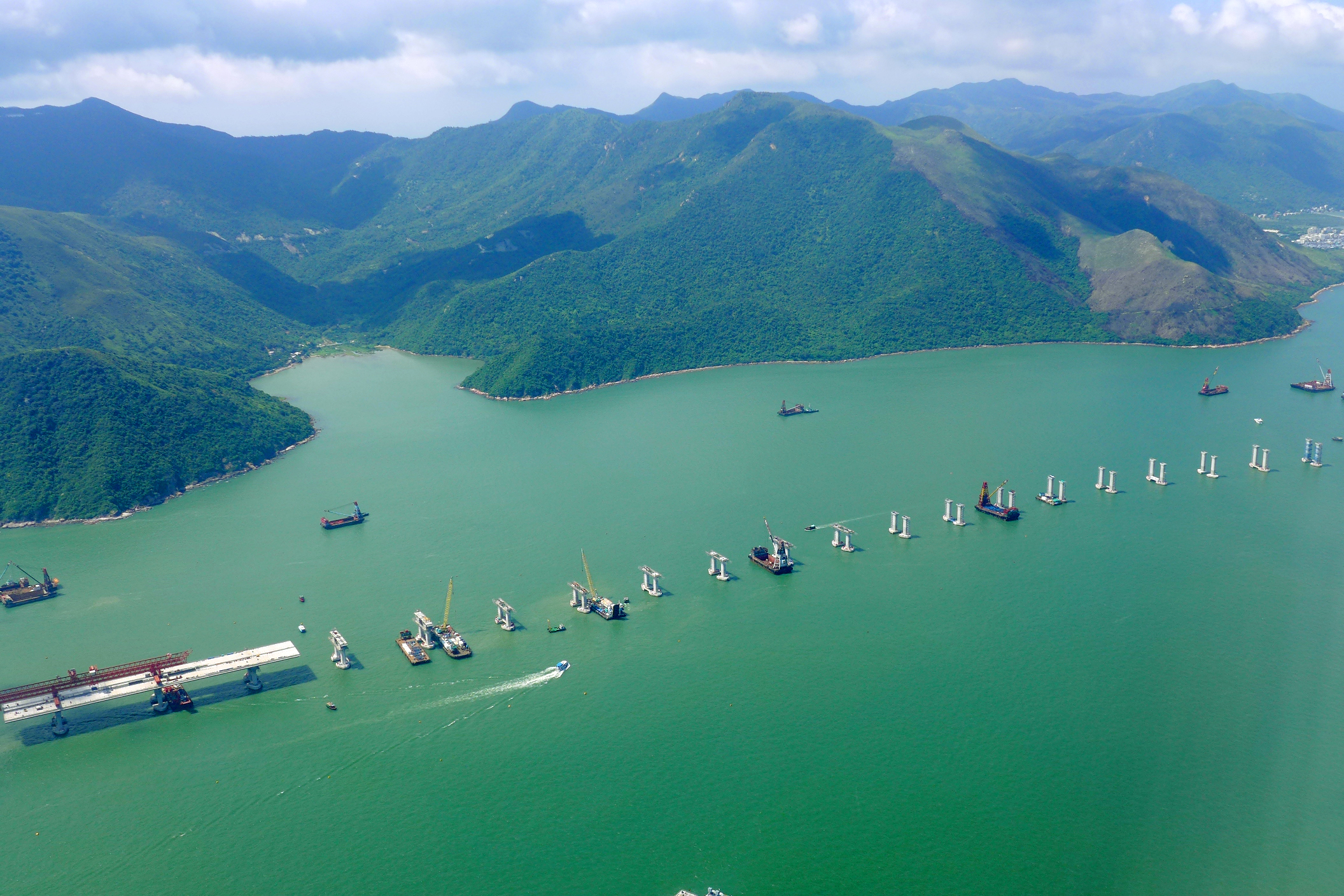
Hong Kong section under construction in 2015 off the coast of Lantau Island

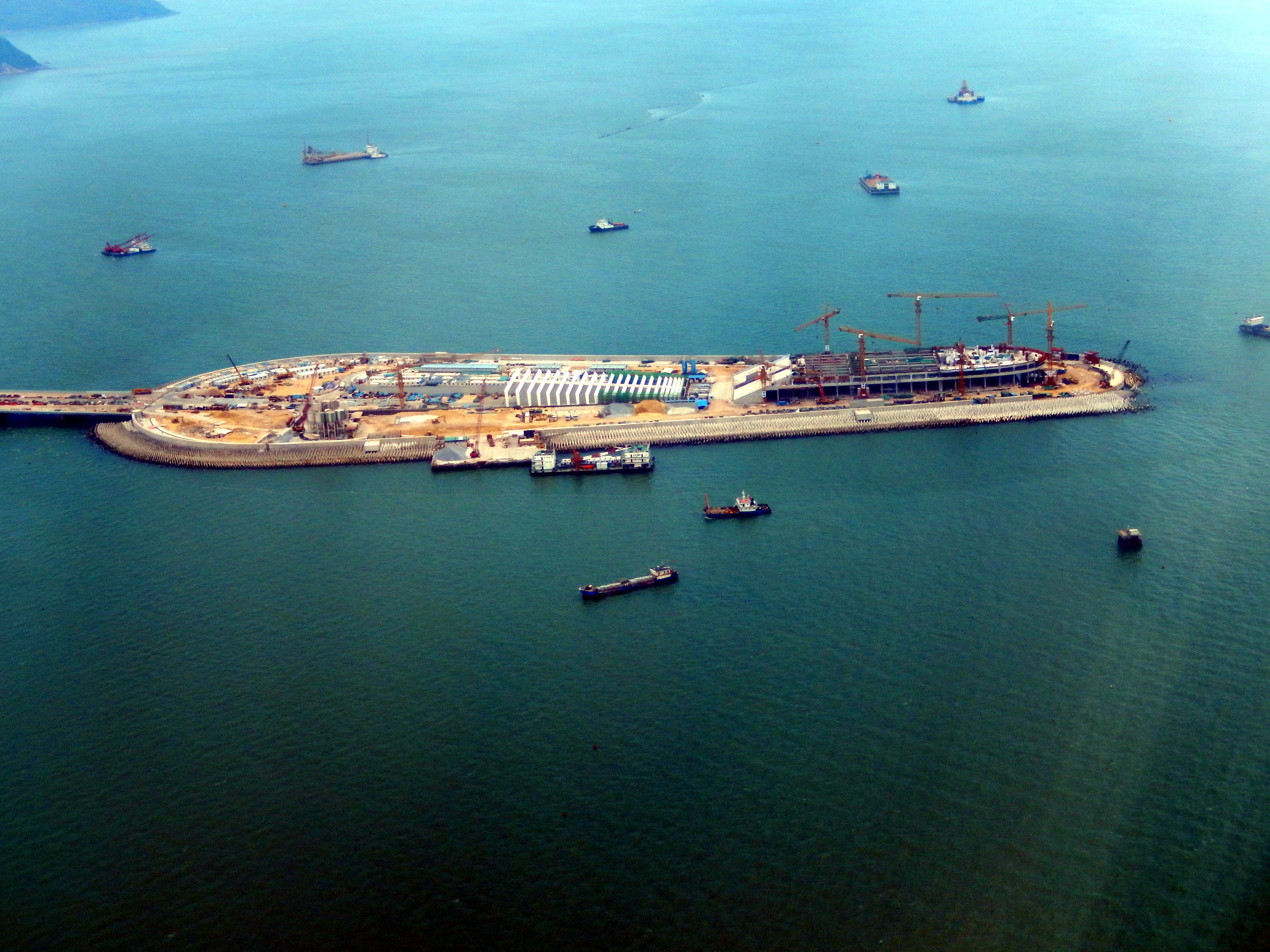
The eastern artificial island in May 2017

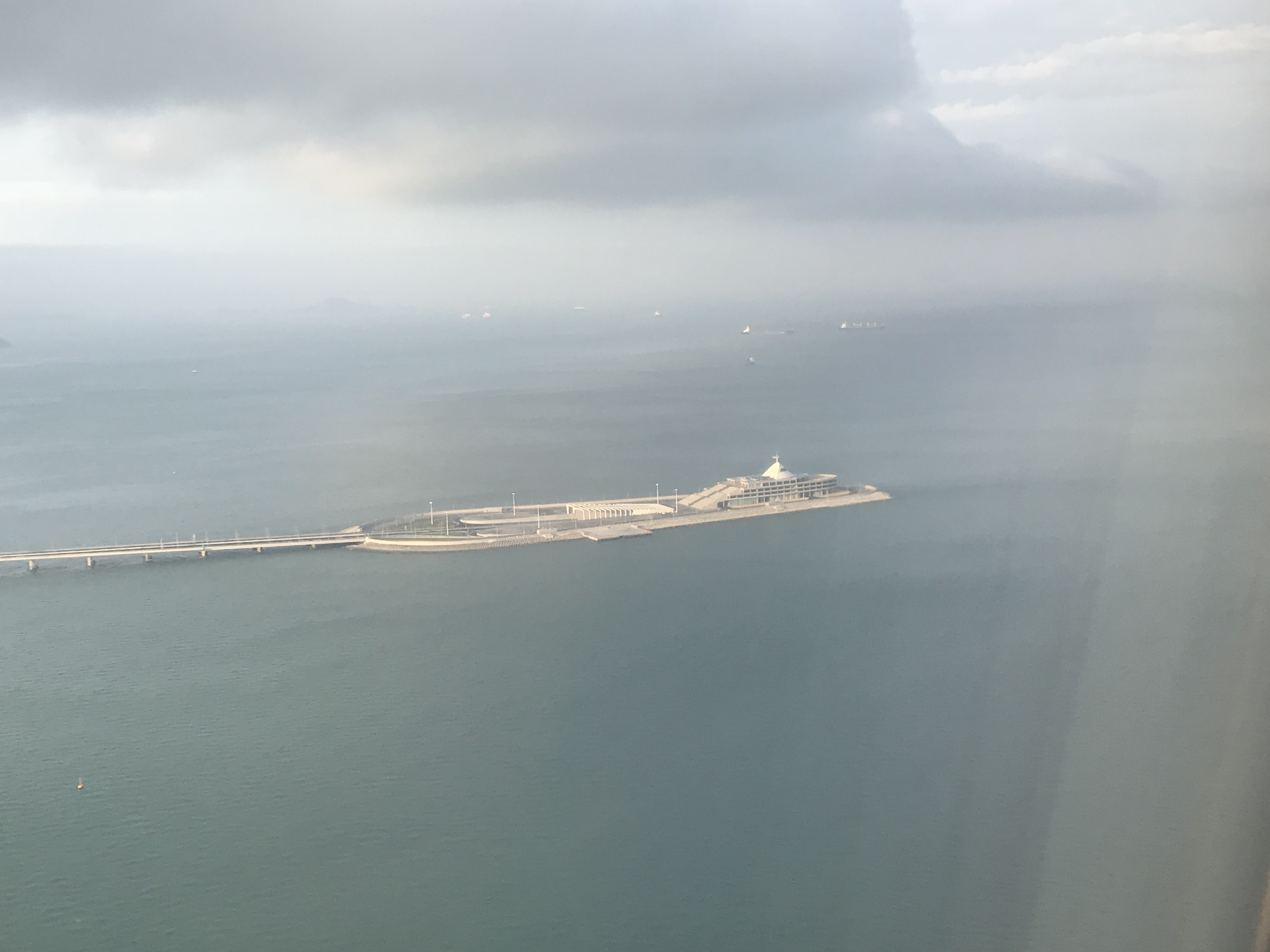
The Artificial Island in May 2018

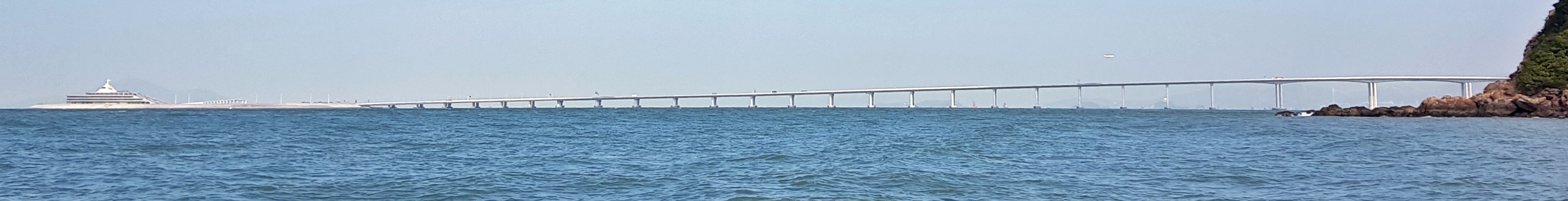
The completed Hong Kong section of the bridge in November 2018

== Sections and elements ==
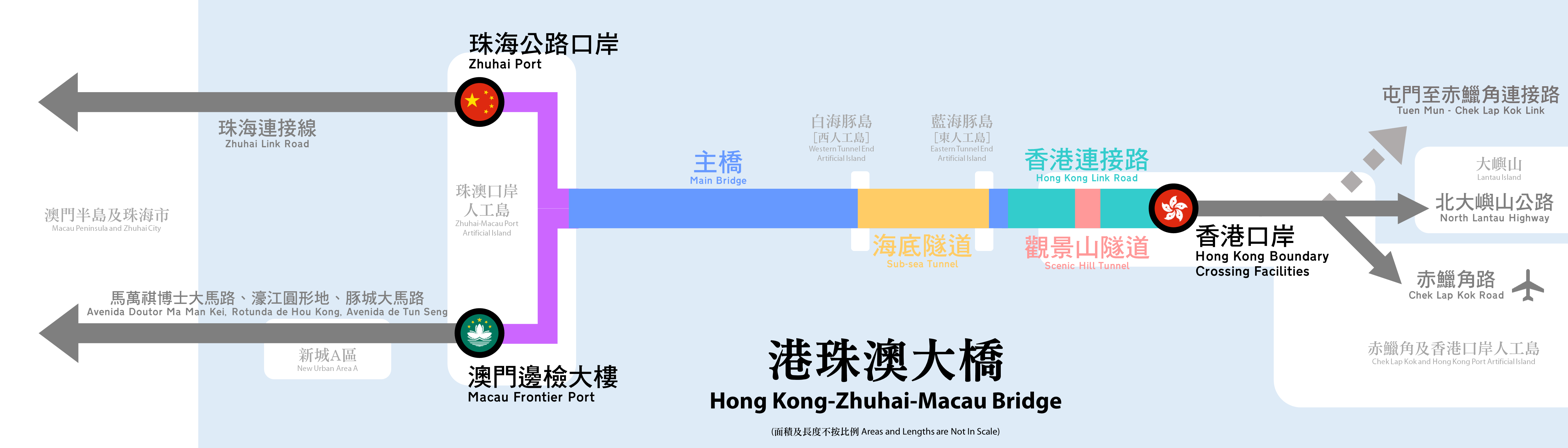

The 55-kilometre (34 mi) HZMB consists of three main sections: the Main Bridge (29.6 km or 18.4 mi) in the middle of the Pearl River estuary, the Hong Kong Link Road (12 km or 7.5 mi) in the east, and the Zhuhai Link Road (13.4 km or 8.3 mi) in the west of the estuary.

=== Main Bridge ===
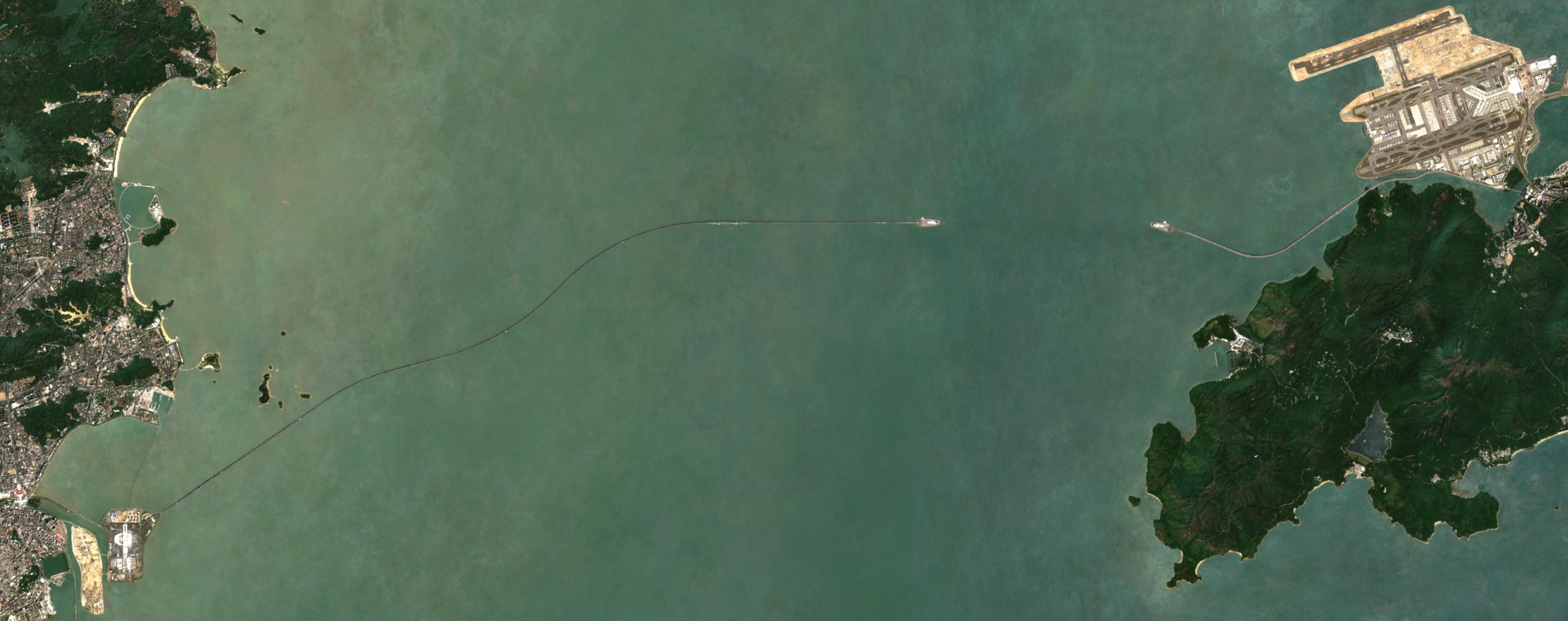
Satellite imagery of the Hong Kong–Zhuhai–Macau Bridge in 2022

The Main Bridge, the largest part of the HZMB project, is a bridge-tunnel system constructed by the mainland Chinese authorities. It connects Zhuhai-Macao Port Artificial Island, an artificial island housing the Boundary Crossing Facilities (BCF) for both mainland China and Macau in the west, to the Hong Kong Link Road in the east.

This section includes a 22.9-kilometre (14.2 mi) bridge construction and a 6.7-kilometre (4.2 mi) immersed tube undersea tunnel that runs between two artificial islands, the Blue Dolphin Island on the west and the White Dolphin Island on the east. The bridge construction crosses the Pearl River estuary with three cable-stayed bridges spanning between 280 and 460 metres (920 and 1,510 ft), allowing shipping traffic to pass underneath.

=== Hong Kong Link Road ===
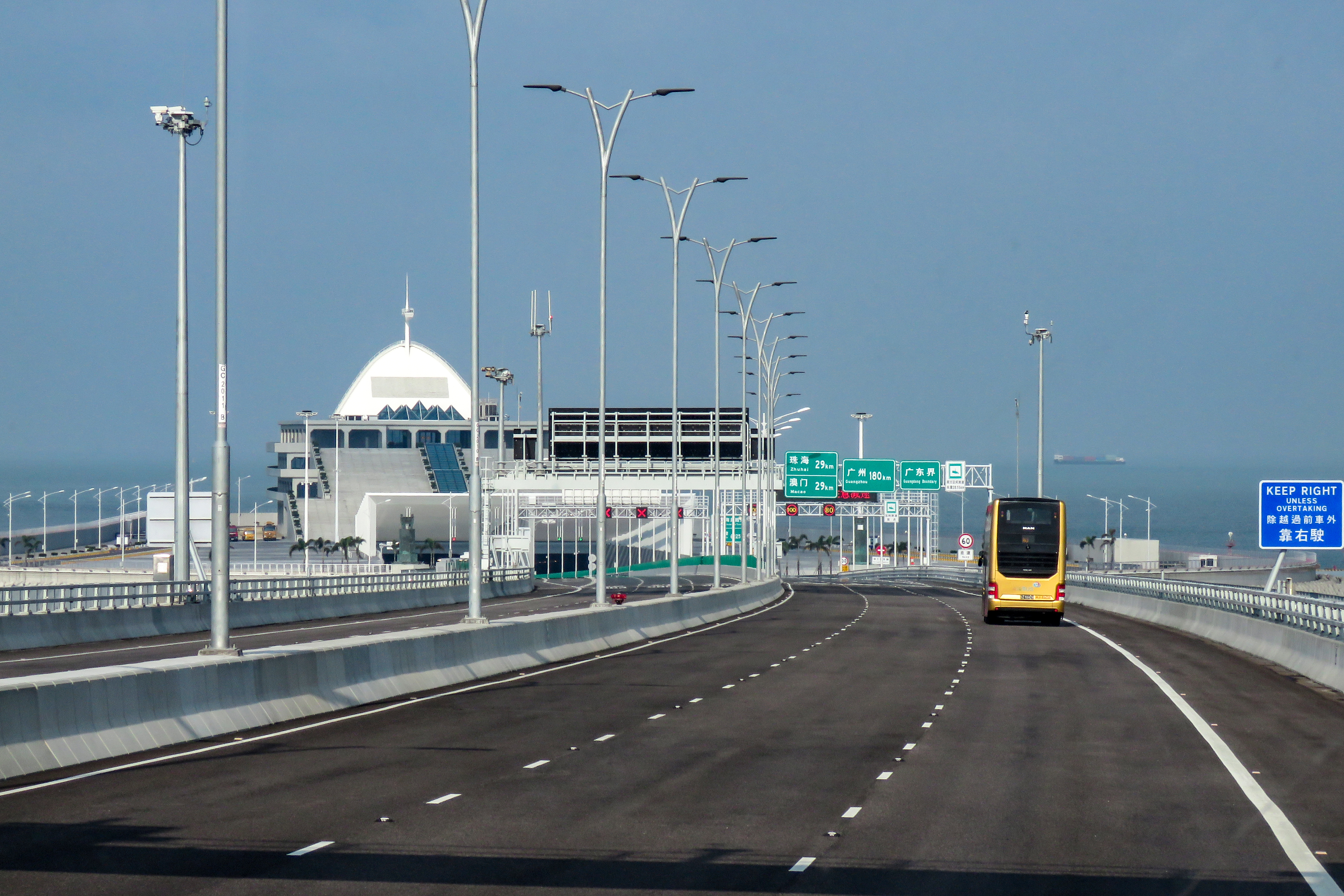
View from the Hong Kong Link Road towards the Main Bridge

Administered under the Highways Department of Hong Kong, the Hong Kong Link Road connects the main bridge-tunnel to an artificial island housing the Hong Kong Boundary Crossing Facilities (HKBCF). This section includes a 9.4-kilometre (5.8 mi) bridge construction, a 1-kilometre (0.62 mi) Scenic Hill Tunnel, and a 1.6-kilometre (0.99 mi) at-grade road along the east coast of the Chek Lap Kok.

=== Zhuhai Link Road ===
The Zhuhai Link Road starts from Zhuhai-Macao Port Artificial Island, passes through the developed area of Gongbei via a tunnel towards Zhuhai, and connects to three major expressways, namely, the Jing-Zhu Expressway, Guang-Zhu West Expressway, and Jiang-Zhu Expressway.

=== Macau Bridge Link ===
Opened in October 2024, the 3-kilometre-long (1.9 mi) bridge provides alternative access to Taipa Island from the HZMB boundary office.

== Left- and right-hand traffic ==
Although the HZMB connects two left-hand traffic (LHT) areas, namely Hong Kong and Macau, the crossing itself is right-hand traffic (RHT), the same as in Zhuhai and other regions of mainland China (the bridge is technically in Zhuhai for most of its length). Thus, drivers from Hong Kong and Macau need to make use of crossing viaducts to switch to RHT upon entering the bridge, and back to LHT upon leaving the bridge when they are back to Hong Kong and Macau. Traffic between Zhuhai and the bridge requires no left-right conversion as they are both RHT.

== Transport ==
=== Shuttle buses ===
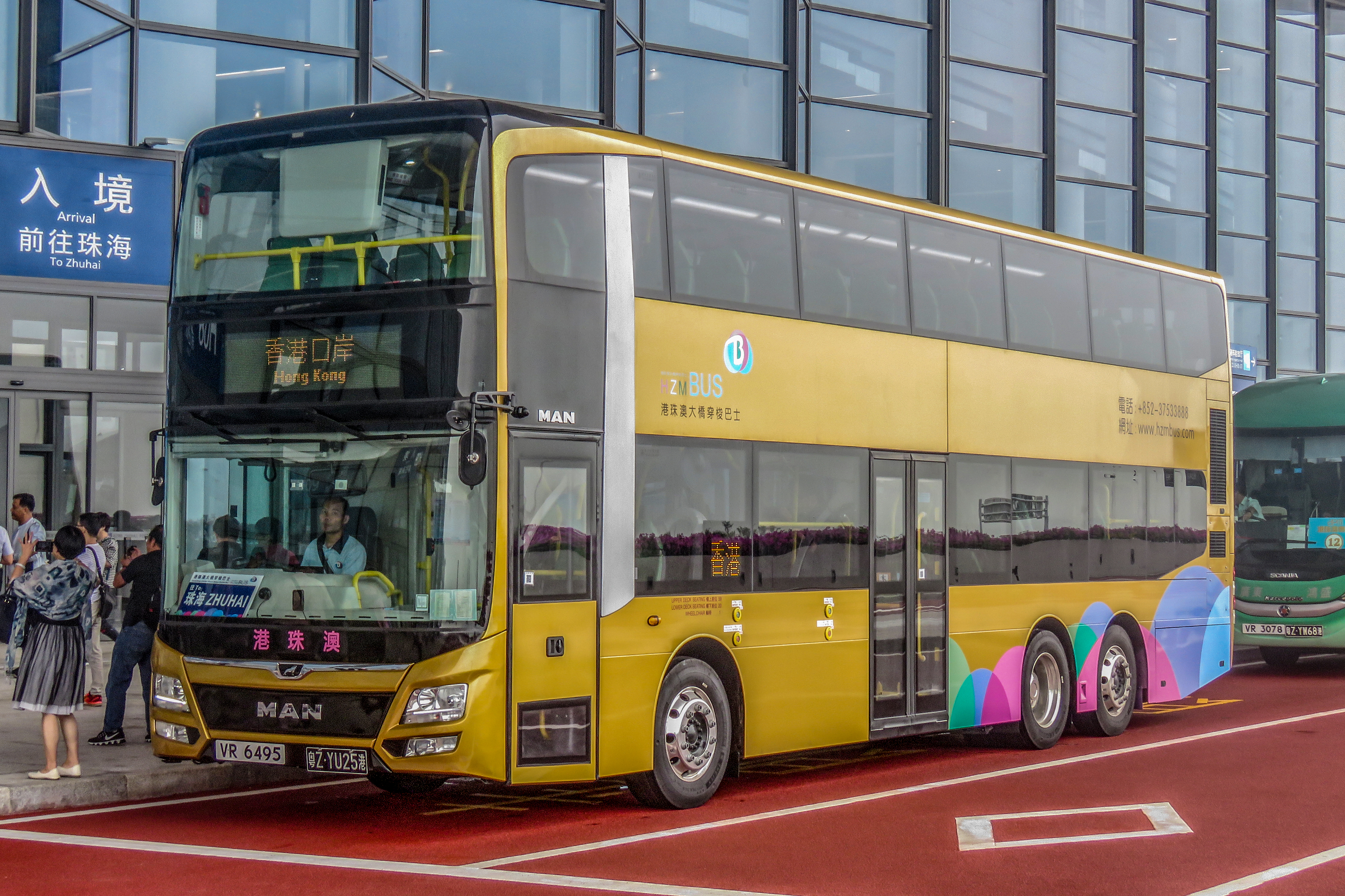
Shuttle buses between Hong Kong and Zhuhai/Macau

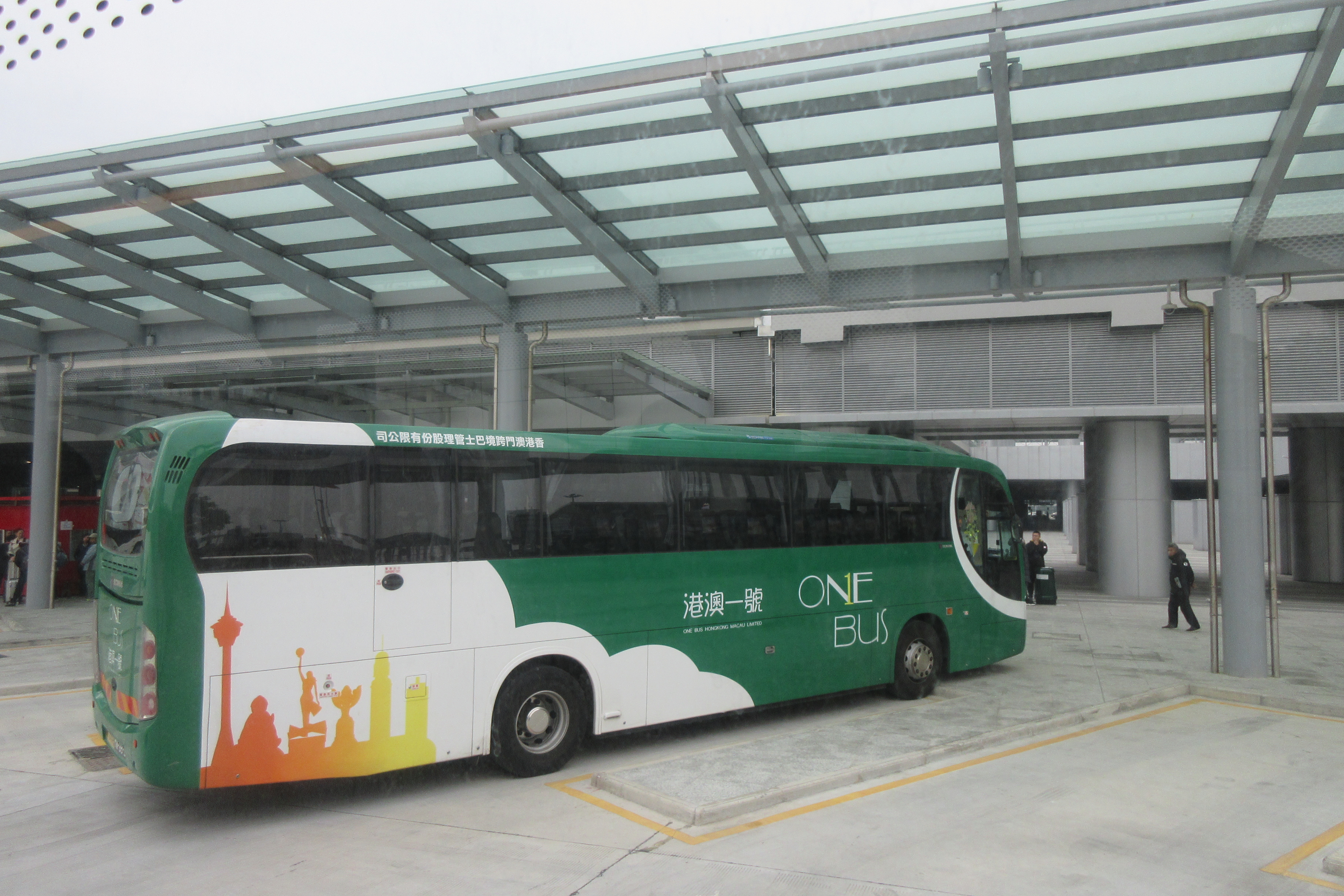
The OneBus Hong Kong Macau services

The HZMBus shuttle bus service (colloquially known as the "golden buses") runs 24 hours a day with bus departures as frequent as every five minutes. The journey across the HZMB takes about 40 minutes.

The HZMB Hong Kong Port can be reached from Hong Kong by taxi or various buses including Cityflyer and Long Win Bus airport routes (A-prefixed routes), NLB airport route A35 and overnight airport route N35, Green Minibus route 901, the B4 shuttle bus from Hong Kong International Airport, the B5 shuttle bus from Sunny Bay MTR station, or the B6 or B6S bus from Tung Chung. In addition, all overnight airport buses (NA-prefixed routes) which are operated by Cityflyer or Long Win stops or terminates at the Hong Kong Port.

The HZMB Zhuhai Port can be reached from Zhuhai by taxis or the L1 bus which uses historic tourist vehicles, or Line-12, 23, 25 or 3 buses.

The HZMB Macau Port can be reached from Macau by taxis or various buses including the 101, 102 and 103 bus from St Paul's and Taipa, or the free casino shuttle buses from Cotai, or the HZMB Integrated Resort Connection bus from the Exterior Ferry terminal.

=== Private vehicles ===
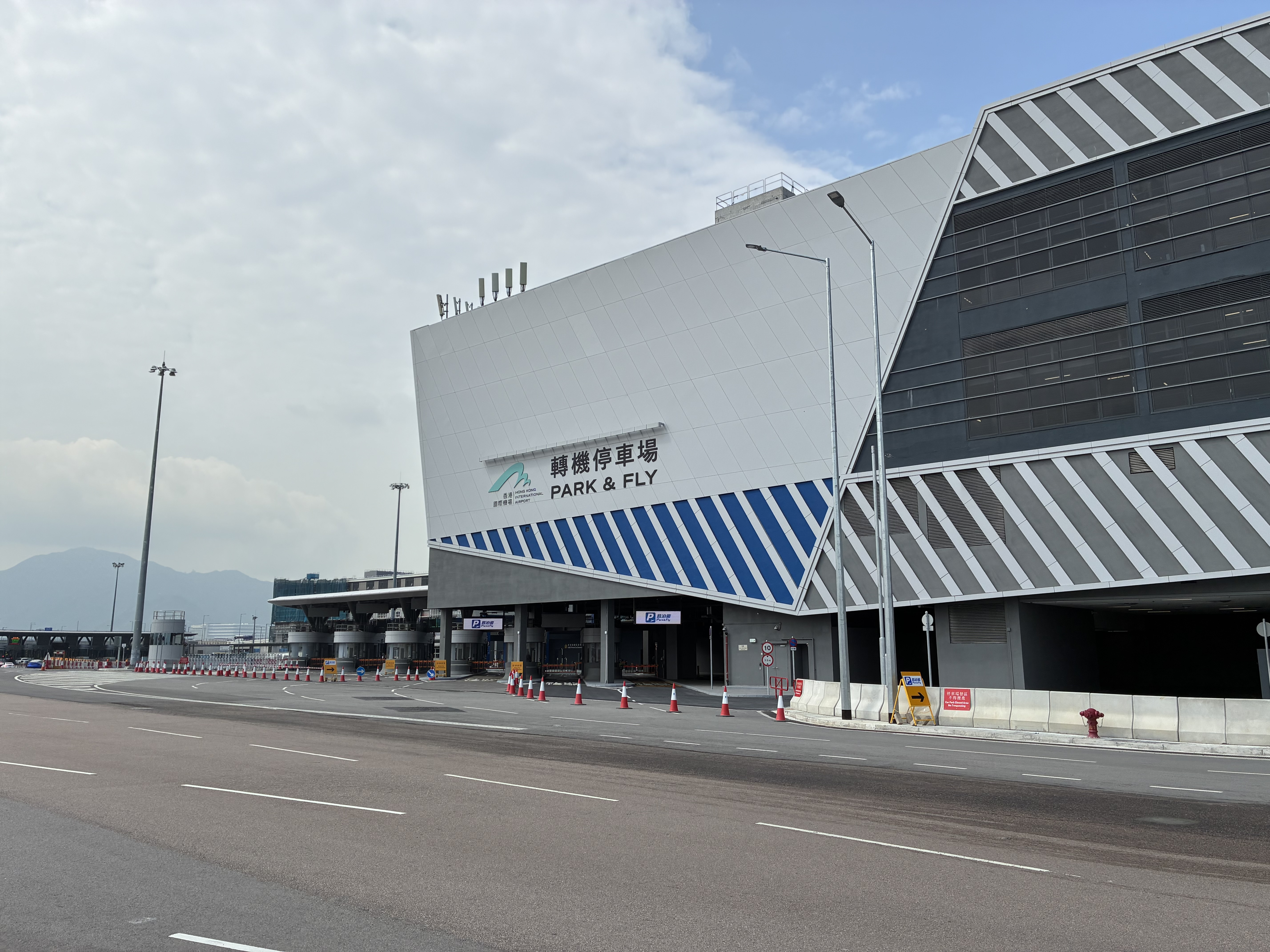
The Park & Fly car park

Driving a car on the HZMB would incur the same restrictions as existing cross-border traffic using other checkpoints such as Shenzhen Bay Port or Huanggang Port. These include applying for separate driving licenses for both Hong Kong and mainland China, a Hong Kong Closed Road Permit for cross-boundary vehicles, and an Approval Notice from the Guangdong Public Security Bureau. Vehicle owners also need to ensure they have the appropriate insurance coverage for the regions they are travelling to.

Hong Kong and Macau are densely populated cities that mostly rely on public transport and discourage excessive private vehicle usage. The Hong Kong government imposes significant fees, taxes and administrative paperwork on private vehicle ownership and usage to deal with road congestion within the HKSAR. In addition, to help compact Macau tackle its road congestion problems, drivers arriving from other regions are strongly encouraged to use a park and ride scheme, leaving their vehicles at a car park on the edge of Macau. A small quota of 300 vehicles are allowed to enter Macau directly. As such by the end of 2017 only 10,000 permits for private vehicles to drive across the HZMB from Hong Kong to Zhuhai had been issued. In addition, the number of vehicles permitted to enter Hong Kong and Macau from other regions is subject to a daily quota.

In late 2023 the permit/quota system relaxed further, allowing more Hong Kong and Macau vehicles to enter Guangdong Province via the Northbound Travel scheme. A similar Southbound Travel scheme was launched in 2025.

The HKIA automated car parks, namely "Park & Fly" and "Park & Visit", are located at the Hong Kong Port of the Bridge. Of which, the Park & Fly car park was open on 15 November, 2025, providing services for passenger using the airport.

== Economic effects ==
The HZMB links three major cities—Hong Kong, Zhuhai, and Macau—which are geographically close but separated by water. With the bridge in place, travelling time between Zhuhai and Hong Kong was cut down from about 4 hours to 30 minutes on the road.

The HZMB project is part of a Beijing-driven strategy to create an economic hub and promote the economic development of the whole area of the Pearl River Delta, which is also known as Greater Bay Area. Hoping to leverage the bridge and create an economic zone linking the three cities, Zhuhai's Hengqin area was designated as a free trade zone in 2015.

== Controversies ==
=== Usage ===
Some residents in Hong Kong have complained of the restrictive cross-border criteria and large amount of administrative paperwork needed in order to use the bridge with their own private vehicle during the initial opening of the bridge as a hindrance to its use.

During the initial operation of the HZM bridge, it was criticized for low usage and not meeting traffic projections. The first day fewer than 1,500 private cars and goods vehicles crossed the bridge, in contrast to the government prediction of 9,200 to 14,000 vehicles per day to cross the bridge. However this figure grew to an average of 8,900 private vehicles per day using the bridge in 2023. and by 2025, excluding HZM bridge shuttle buses, 13,000 private, coach and goods vehicles were crossing the HZM Bridge every day. Most of the bridge's traffic is carried on frequent shuttle buses, this is reflected in the high passenger traffic figures crossing the bridge relative to the volume of private and coach vehicles, with on average 85,000 passengers crossing the bridge every day in 2025. On 31 January 2025, the Zhuhai port of the bridge reported a new record of 156,000 passenger trips in a single day.

=== Delays and budget overruns ===
The artificial island housing the Hong Kong Boundary Crossing Facilities (HKBCF) was reported drifting due to an unconventional method, hitherto unused in Hong Kong, for land reclamation using a row of circular steel cells pile-driven into the mud and filled with inert material to form a seawall.

The drifting of parts of the reclaimed island allegedly caused a delay in the HZMB project. In 2015 the Highways Department denied various reports of movement up to 20 metres (66 ft) but admitted that parts of the reclaimed land had moved "up to six or seven metres", claiming that some movement was expected and safety had not been jeopardised.

Mainland contractors also reportedly had difficulty constructing immersed tubes for their section of the project, with the director of the Guangdong National Development and Reform Commission stating that 2020 would be a difficult target to meet.

By 2017, the Main Bridge of the HZMB project had experienced a cost overrun of about ¥10 billion, blamed on increased labour and material costs, as well as changes to the design and construction schemes.

=== Worker deaths and injuries ===
The number of deaths and injuries during the construction project came under scrutiny in Hong Kong. In addition to nine fatalities on the mainland side, more than ten deaths were reported on the Hong Kong side of the construction project, plus between 234 and 600 injuries, depending on the source. In April 2017, the Construction Site Workers General Union, the Labour Party and the Confederation of Trade Unions demonstrated at the Central Government Complex, demanding the government take action.

Lawmaker Fernando Cheung also expressed concern over the unknown death toll on the Chinese side of the project, speculating: "the project is known as the 'bridge of blood and tears' and we are only talking about the Hong Kong side. We don't even know what is happening in China. I suppose the situation could be 10 times worse than that in Hong Kong." He said that the Hong Kong Government had a responsibility to consider worker safety on the Chinese side.

=== Faked safety testing ===
In 2017, Hong Kong's Independent Commission Against Corruption (ICAC) arrested 21 employees (2 senior executives, 14 laboratory technicians, and 5 laboratory assistants) of Jacobs China Limited, a contractor of the Civil Engineering and Development Department for falsifying concrete test results, thus potentially risking the safety of the bridge for public use. In December 2017, a lab technician pleaded guilty and was sentenced to imprisonment for eight months, while the others await sentencing. Hong Kong's Highways Department conducted tests again after the falsified results were exposed and found all test results met safety standards.

=== Seawall integrity ===
In April 2018, the public and media raised questions over the integrity of the seawalls protecting the artificial islands at both ends of the undersea tunnel. In footage taken by drone users and mariners, the dolosse installed at the edges of the artificial islands appear to have dislodged. Some civil engineers suggested that there was an error in design. In dismissing the safety concerns, the HZMB Authority said the dolosse were designed to be submerged and the design was working as intended. Director of Highways Department Daniel Chung denied on 8 April 2018 that the breakwater components had been washed away by waves.

Subsequent aerial footage posted online showed a section of the dolosse breakwater completely underwater. Civil engineer So Yiu-kwan told Hong Kong media on 12 April 2018 that the water level, at the time the photos were taken, was about 1.74 mPD (metres above Principal Datum), but the maximum water level could reach 2.7 mPD. He said the dolosse would offer no wave protection if entirely submerged, and further alleged that they had been installed backwards.

=== Impact on wildlife ===
Conservationists at WWF Hong Kong blamed the construction of the HZMB for the falling number of white dolphins in the waters near the bridge. The dolphins found near waters of Lantau were worst hit with numbers dropping by 60 percent between April 2015 and March 2016.

== See also ==
- Bohai Strait tunnel – Proposed Eastern China underpass
- Environment of Hong Kong – Overview of the environment in Hong Kong
- Environment of China
- Hong Kong–Macau relations
- Qiongzhou Strait tunnel – Strait separating mainland China from Hainan
- Taiwan Strait Tunnel Project – Proposed road and rail tunnel
- Transport in China
- Transport in Hong Kong
  - List of buildings and structures in Hong Kong
  - List of streets and roads in Hong Kong
  - List of tunnels and bridges in Hong Kong
- Transport in Macau
- Tuen Mun - Chek Lap Kok Link – Hong Kong road infrastructure project − (short TM-CLK), tunnel from HZMB HK BCF to New Territories
