= Bridge–tunnel =

Road or rail connection across water

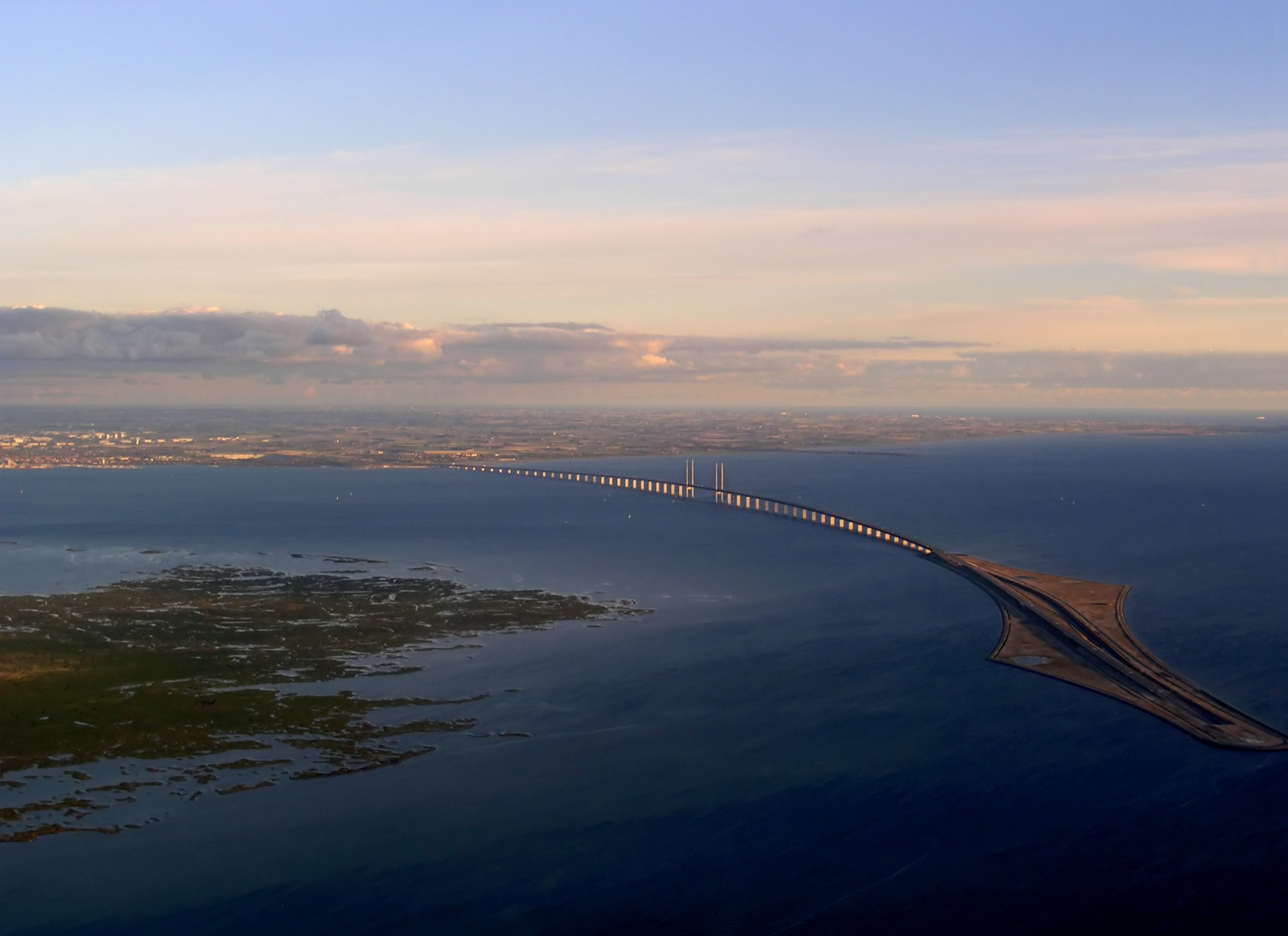
The Øresund Connection

A bridge–tunnel is a persistent, unbroken road or rail connection across water that uses a combination of bridges and tunnels, and sometimes causeways, and does not involve intermittent connections such as drawbridges or ferries.

Bridge–tunnels are a form of fixed link or fixed crossing which replaces ferry service. Fixed links are often, but not necessarily, intercontinental links between continents or transoceanic links to offshore islands.

== Tunnels and bridge–tunnels ==
For water crossings, a tunnel is generally more costly to construct than a bridge. However, navigational considerations at some locations may limit the use of high bridges or drawbridge spans when crossing shipping channels, necessitating the use of a tunnel. Examples of such tunnels include the Downtown Tunnel and Midtown Tunnel under the Elizabeth River between Norfolk and Portsmouth, Virginia in the United States, the George Massey Tunnel in Greater Vancouver, Canada, and the Cross-Harbour Tunnel under Victoria Harbour between the twin cities of Victoria and Kowloon in Hong Kong.

In other instances, when longer distances are involved, a bridge–tunnel may be less costly and easier to ventilate than a single, lengthy tunnel. This situation may occur when more economical drawbridges are not allowed for one reason or another. For example, in the U.S. state of Virginia, such crossings include the Hampton Roads Bridge–Tunnel and the Monitor–Merrimac Memorial Bridge–Tunnel, both of which cross the harbor at Hampton Roads, and the Chesapeake Bay Bridge–Tunnel, a 37-kilometer-long (23 mi) structure (including approach highways) that crosses the mouth of the Chesapeake Bay with a combination of bridges and tunnels across two widely separated shipping channels, using four artificial islands built in the bay as portals. Tunnels had to be used instead of drawbridges because the waterways they cross are critical for access to Naval Station Norfolk and could not be blocked by a bridge collapse in the event of disaster or war.

Another example is the Øresund Bridge, connecting Sweden and Denmark. It has a 7.8 km (4.8 mi) bridge, an artificial island in the middle of the Øresund strait, and a 4 km (2.5 mi) tunnel nearest to Denmark. A bridge could not be built there for two reasons: height restrictions imposed by adjacent Copenhagen International Airport (the route's path passes the ends of some of the runways; the minimum practical height for a bridge would have interfered with airplanes using those runways) and the perennial threat of ice (a bridge's columns would have encouraged ice dams which could block the strait).

The Tokyo Bay Aqua-Line is a bridge–tunnel combination across Tokyo Bay in Japan. It connects the city of Kawasaki in Kanagawa Prefecture with the city of Kisarazu in Chiba Prefecture. With an overall length of 14 km (8.7 mi), it includes a 4.4 km (2.7 mi) bridge and 9.6 km (6.0 mi) tunnel underneath the bay—which is the longest underwater tunnel for cars in the world. Drawbridges were impractical here because Tokyo Bay is too active a sea lane.

The longest crossing on the Yangtze River in China is a tunnel-bridge-bridge complex, consisting of the Shanghai Yangtze River Tunnel, Shanghai Yangtze River Bridge (one of the longest cable-stayed bridges in the world), Chongming–Qidong Yangtze River Bridge and connecting viaducts at the river's mouth in Shanghai. This fixed link carries the G40 Shanghai–Xi'an Expressway from the north bank to the south bank via two islands and is about 65 km (40 mi) in total length.

== See also ==
- List of bridge–tunnels
- Intercontinental and transoceanic fixed links
- bridge and tunnel (disambiguation)
