= Lingdingyang =

River channel in China

Coordinates: 22°24′55″N 113°43′47″E

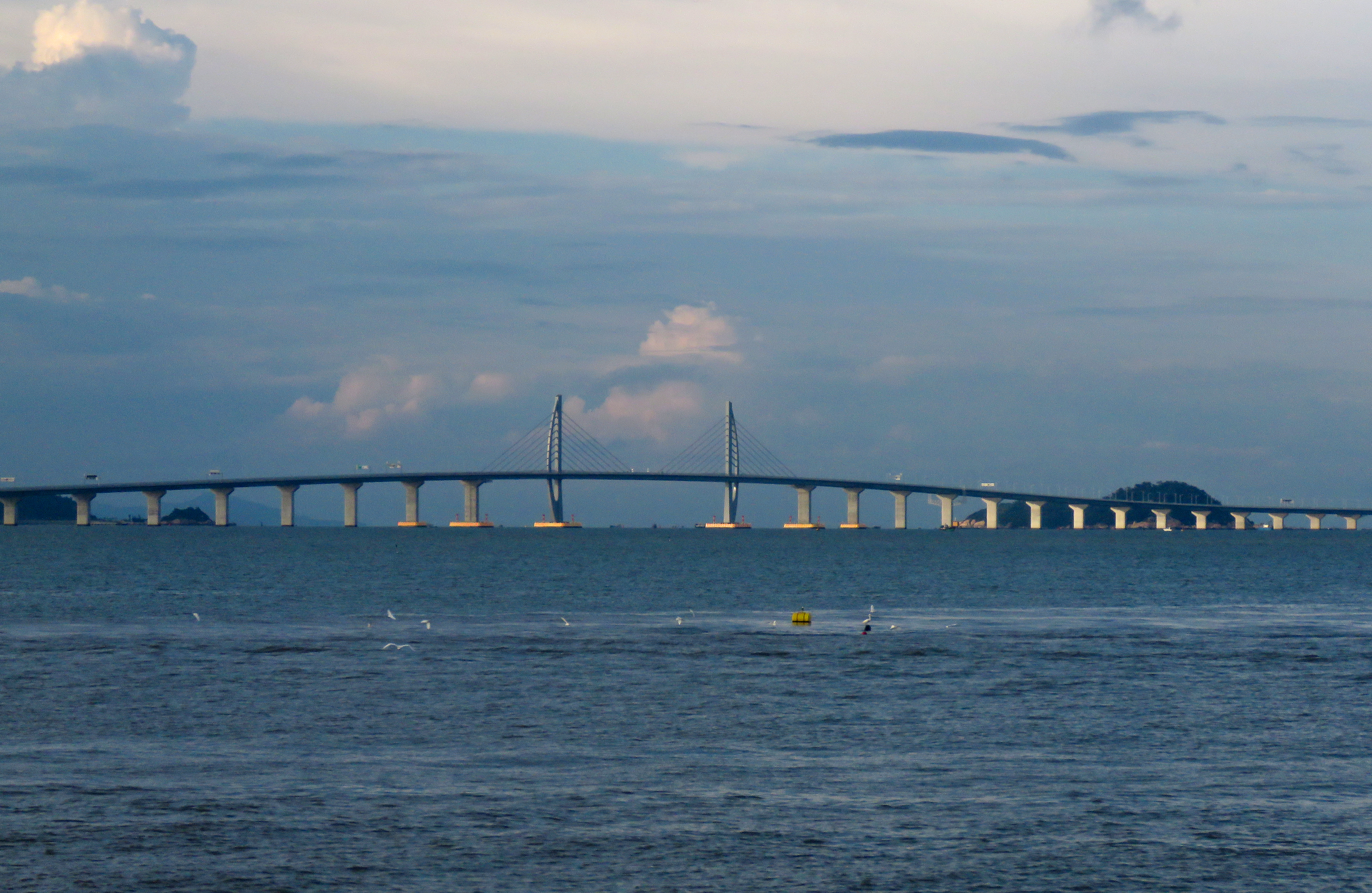
- Lingdingyang with the Hong Kong–Zhuhai–Macau Bridge near Zhuhai and Macau.
- Chinese: 伶仃洋
- Literal meaning: Lonely Ocean
Transcriptions
Standard Mandarin
- Hanyu Pinyin: Língdīngyáng
Yue: Cantonese
- Yale Romanization: Lìhngdīng Yèuhng
- Jyutping: ling4 ding1 joeng4

Lingdingyang (Chinese: 伶仃洋; lit. 'Lonely Ocean') or Lingding Channel is the middle channel of the Pearl River estuary which runs from Humen to Jiuzhouyang. Humen separates Lingdingyang and Shiziyang, the upper channel of the Pearl River Estuary, in the north and Jiuzhouyang, the lower channel of the Pearl River Estuary at the eastern tip of Taipa, from the western tip of Lantau all the way to the southern end of the Wanshan Archipelago. Currently, Hong Kong–Zhuhai–Macau Bridge (HZMB), a bridge and tunnel across Lingdingyang with the Shenzhen–Zhongshan Bridge, crosses the channel.

== History ==
At the end of the Southern Song Dynasty, Wen Tianxiang, who was the last Prime Minister of the Southern Song, was captured by the Yuan army in Guangdong. When the Yuan warship carrying him sailing down the Lingdingyang, he composed a poem titled "Crossing the Lingdingyang (Lonely Ocean)" to express his feeling:

辛苦遭逢起一經，干戈寥落四周星。
山河破碎風飄絮，身世浮沉雨打萍。
惶恐灘頭說惶恐，零丁洋裏嘆零丁。
人生自古誰無死？留取丹心照汗青。

English Translation:

I studied the classics diligently to become an official. Four bleak years have been spent in fierce battles.
Our land is broken like catkins in the wind. I wandered around like a duckweed soaked in the rain.
At the Shallows of Frightful, I fought my way at the frightful battle I couldn't won. On the Lonely Ocean, a lonely captured like me could only sigh.
Down the ages who could avoid his death? Let my loyal heart remain true and shine in the annals of history.
