= List of islands of China =

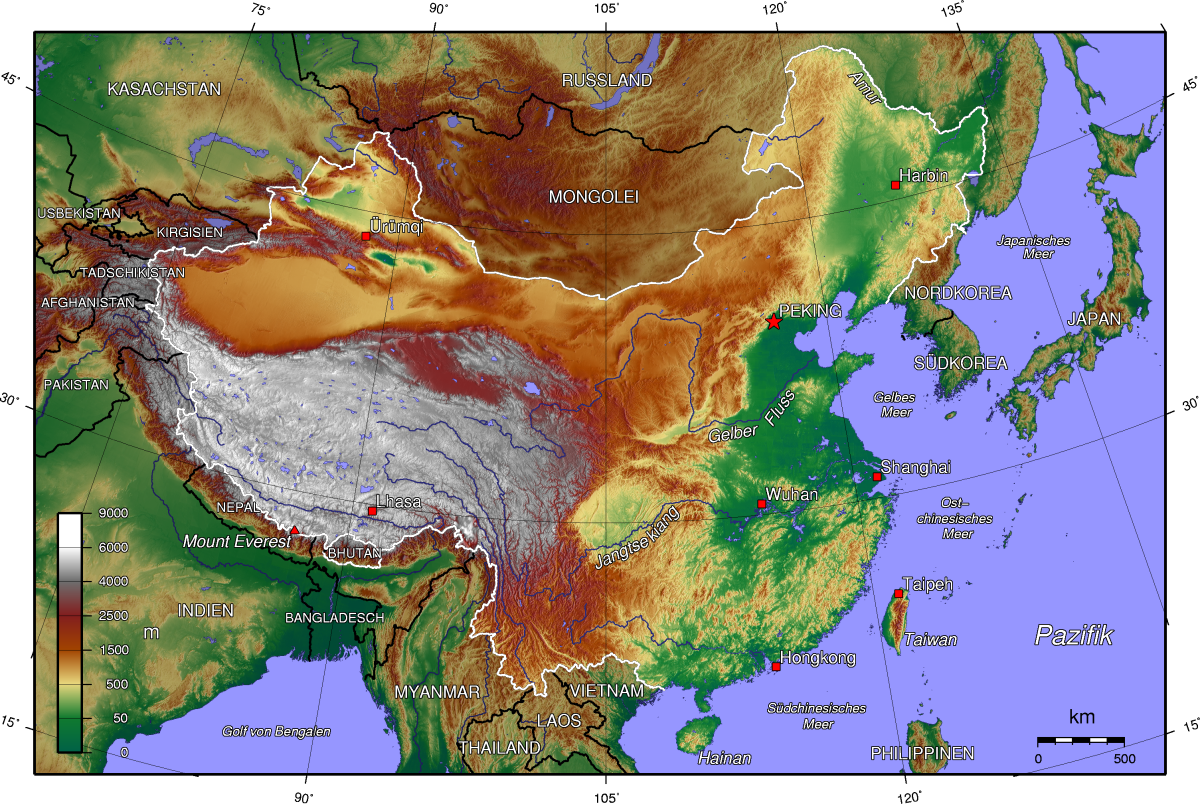
Map of China

This is a list of islands of China. Islands that are claimed by China, including those under the control of the Republic of China (Taiwan) and those disputed with other countries, are noted in the section of disputed islands.

== Chinese characters that mean island ==
The following is a list of Chinese characters (traditional and simplified) that mean 'island', preceded by the Hanyu Pinyin pronunciation in Mandarin Chinese.

- Dǎo (島 / 岛) — the most generic character for island in the Chinese language
- Yǔ/Xù (嶼 / 屿) — mainly used around Fujian in the Min Chinese region
- Shān (山) — commonly used in the south
- Shā (沙) — used in the South China Sea outlying islands or islands in rivers
- Yán (巖 / 岩) or Yántóu (巖頭 / 岩头) — used around Guangdong and Zhejiang
- Zhì (峙) — mainly used around Zhejiang; historically written as (屿)
- Ào (嶴 / 岙) — often used around Zhejiang though it has mostly been replaced by (岛)
- Tuó (坨) — often used in Northern China
- Táng (塘) or (溏) — used in Zhejiang
- Jī (磯 / 矶) — used around Zhejiang and Shandong
- Zhōu (洲) — used for many islands in rivers

Names for an archipelago/islands/island group

- Qúndǎo ([羣島] 群島 / 群岛) — Clustered islands
- Lièdǎo (列島 / 列島) — Lined islands
- Dǎoqún ([島羣] 島群 / 岛群)

== By provincial-level administrative divisions ==
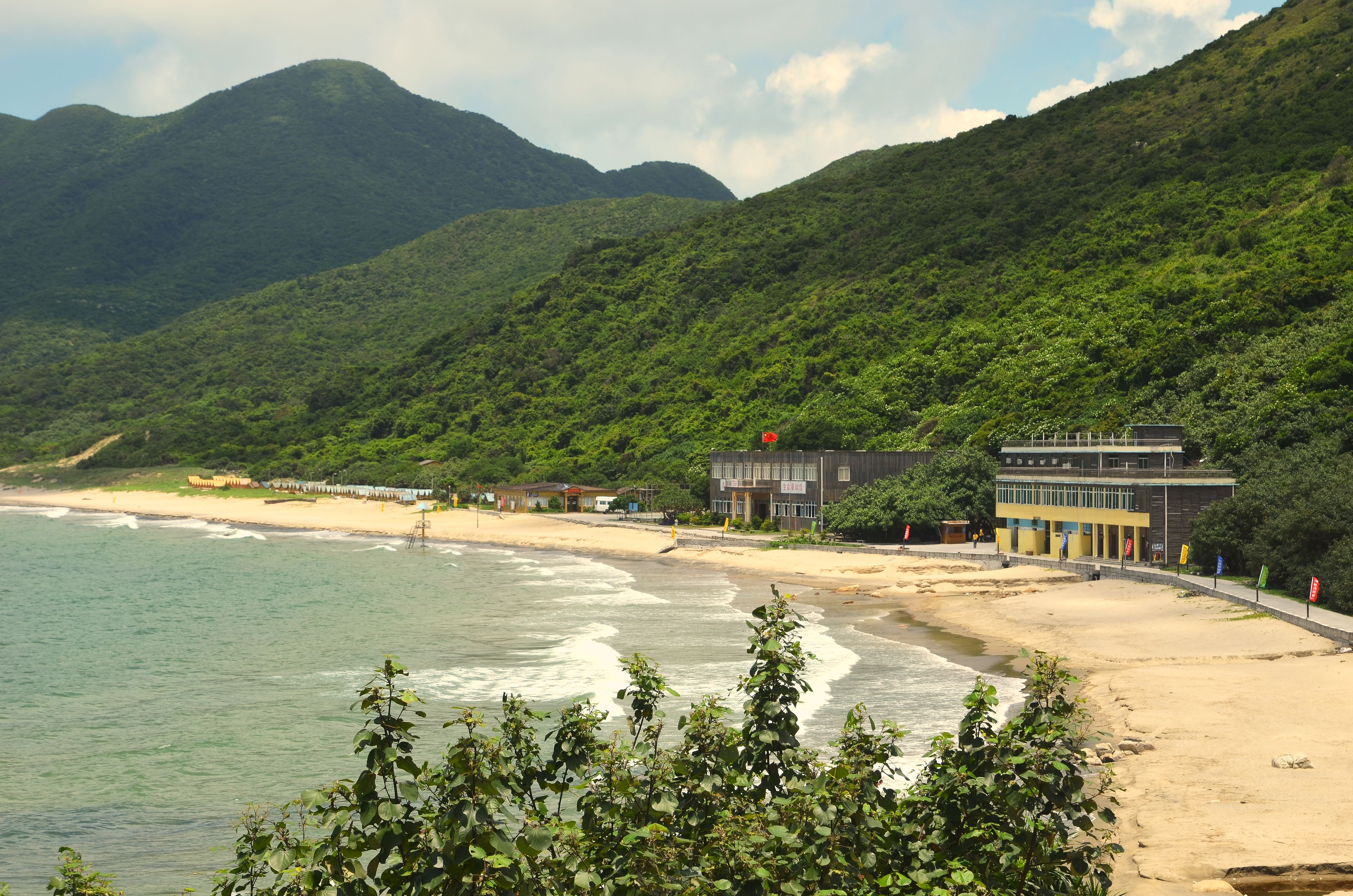
A view on Hebao Island

=== Fujian ===
- Gulangyu Island
- Luci Island
- Meizhou Island
- Niushan Island
- Pingtan Island, Fujian
- Xiamen Island
- Xiaori Island
- Dongshan Island
- 43 islands in Haidao Township
  - Xiyang Island (西洋岛), also known as Spider Island (Zhizhu Island, Chih-chu Tao; 蜘蛛島) 26.509879°N 120.045344°E
  - Fuying Island (浮鹰岛), also known as Shuangfeng Island (雙峯島) 26.578459°N 120.140509°E
  - the Sishuang Islands (Sishuang Liedao, Pei-shuang Lieh-tao; 四礵列岛)
    - Beishuang Island (Pei-shuang; 北礵岛) 26.702357°N 120.352581°E
    - Dongshuang Island (Tung-shuang; 东礵岛) 26.681677°N 120.382951°E
    - Xishuang Island (Hsi-shuang; 西礵岛) 26.654204°N 120.321156°E
    - Nanshuang Island (Nan-shuang; 南礵岛) 26.645148°N 120.356295°E
  - Xiaoxiyang Island (小西洋岛), also known as Isthmus Island (Yisimasi Island, I-ssu-ma-ssu Tao; 乙四馬四島) 26.546441°N 120.001213°E
  - Kuishan Island (Kuishan Dao; 魁山岛), also known as Zhuishan (Chui Shan; 錐山) 26.493586°N 120.134632°E
  - Maci Island (Ma Chick; 马刺岛) 26.538001°N 120.139128°E
  - Nigu Island (Nu Geu Sen; 尼姑屿) 26.557534°N 120.151459°E

=== Guangdong ===
- Chuanshan Archipelago
  - Shangchuan Island
  - Xiachuan Island
- Dachan Island
- Damang Island
- Dezhou Island
- Gaolan Island
- Hebao island
- Hengqin
- Mayu Island
- Naozhou Island
- Nei Lingding Island
- Shamian Island, Guangzhou
- Qi'ao Island
- Wanshan Archipelago
  - Dawanshan Dao
  - Guishan Island
  - Dan'gan Group
  - Jiapeng Liedao
  - Pengjia Group
  - Southwestern Group
  - Central Group
  - Northwestern Group
  - Xiaowanshan Dao
- Zhongshan Dao

=== Guangxi ===
- Weizhou and Xieyang Islands
  - Weizhou Island

=== Hainan ===
- Hainan (province) (the largest island under the control of the People's Republic of China; the second largest island claimed by the People's Republic of China, ranking after Taiwan which is under the control of the Republic of China)

=== Hunan ===
- Junshan Island (君山岛), an island of Dongting Lake in Junshan District, Yueyang
- Orange Isle (橘子洲), a sandy isle of the middle Xiang River in Changsha
- Ping Island (萍岛), a sandy isle of the upper Xiang River in Lingling District, Yongzhou

=== Hong Kong ===
- 235 islands within Hong Kong
  - Cheung Chau
  - Hong Kong Island
  - Lamma Island
  - Lantau Island
  - Ma Wan Island
  - Peng Chau
  - Po Toi Island
  - Tsing Yi Island

=== Liaoning ===
- Changhai Islands

=== Macau ===
- 2 islands exclusively within Macau
  - Coloane
  - Taipa
- Macau Island

=== Shandong ===
- Zhifu Island

=== Shanghai ===
- Changshan Islands
- Changxing Island
- Chongming Island
- Hengsha Island
- Jiangyanansha
- Jiuduansha
- Xiasha
- Sheshan Island
- Zhongsha

=== Yunnan ===
- Islands of Erhai Lake:
  - Jinsuo Island
  - Nanzhao Island
  - Xiaoputuo
  - Yuji Island

=== Zhejiang ===
- Zhoushan Archipelago (1,390 islands)
  - Zhoushan Island (4th-largest)
  - Shengsi Islands
  - Daishan Island
  - Tong Island

== Disputed islands ==
=== East China Sea ===
- Senkaku Islands, Japan

=== Fujian ===
- Jinmen Island (as a county)
- Mazu Islands (as a township)
- Wuqiu Islands (as a village)

=== South China Sea ===
- Huangyan Dao
- Hupijiao Rock (reef)
- Paracel Islands
- Spratly Islands
- Suyan Rock (reef)
- Yajiao Rock (reef)
- Zhongsha Islands
- Pratas Island

=== Taiwan ===
The political status of Taiwan is a longstanding dispute. Taiwan Island and Penghu are claimed by the People's Republic of China, but are currently administered by the Republic of China, commonly known as "Taiwan".

- Taiwan
- Penghu

== See also ==
- Geography of China
- List of islands
- List of islands by area
- 开发利用无居民海岛名录 (in Chinese), Names of Uninhabited Islands for Development and Usage
