= Guishan Island =

Guishan Island may refer to:

- Guishan Island (Yilan), an island of Taiwan
- Guishan Island (China), an island of China in the Wanshan Archipelago
