= Ilex cinerea =

Conservation status
- Least Concern (IUCN 3.1)

Scientific classification
- Kingdom: Plantae
- Clade: Tracheophytes
- Clade: Angiosperms
- Clade: Eudicots
- Clade: Asterids
- Order: Aquifoliales
- Family: Aquifoliaceae
- Genus: Ilex
- Species: I. cinerea

Binomial name
- Ilex cinerea Champ. ex Benth.

Synonyms
- Ilex cinerea var. faberi Loes.

Species of plant

Ilex cinerea, the gray holly or Hong Kong holly, is a species of flowering plant in the family Aquifoliaceae, native to Hong Kong, Hebao Island, and Hainan in China, and to northern Vietnam. An evergreen shrub or small tree usually 3 to 6 m (10 to 20 ft) tall, it is found at higher elevations in mountain forests. It is used as a street tree in Hong Kong.
