= Golconda (1815 ship) =

History

United Kingdom
- Name: Golconda
- Namesake: Golconda
- Builder: Michael Smith, Howrah, Calcutta
- Launched: 23 May 1815
- Fate: Foundered 24 September 1840

General characteristics
- Tons burthen: 802, or 858, or 85828/94(bm)
- Length: 140 ft 3 in (42.7 m)
- Beam: 36 ft 6 in (11.1 m)

Golconda was launched at Calcutta in 1815. She made one voyage for the British East India Company (EIC) from India to England in 1819. She spent the bulk of her career as a country ship, trading in the East Indies until she wrecked in September 1840 while carrying troops to Canton.

== Career ==
EIC voyage (1819): Captain James Edwards was at Madras on 20 April 1819. Golconda reached Simon's Bay on 6 July and Saint Helena on 10 August. She arrived at Greenhithe on 23 October. At the time her owner was F. J. I. Edwards & Co.

Golconda in the East India Registry and Directory:

Year	Master	Owner	Registry
1819		Alexander & Co.	Calcutta
1824	J.J. Edwards	Alexander & Co.	Calcutta
1827	R.L.Laws	Alexander & Co.	Calcutta
1828			Not listed
1829	C.C. Clarke	Framjee Cowesjee	Bombay

On 20 September 1835, Golconda sailed from Singapore for Canton in company with David Clark, Sulimany, Duke of Lancaster, Mermaid, and the Danish ship Matadore. On 16 October during bad weather north of 19°0′N 117°20′E, Golconda ran into Matadore and almost cut her in half. Matadore sank after Golconda was able to rescue her crew. (Note: Matadore, of about 500 tons (bm), was a relatively new ship, only on her second voyage. She was carrying rice, opium, and 30,000 Spanish dollars.) Golconda was herself badly damaged and her crew had to man her pumps and jettison 700 bales (of cotton) forward where she was leaking in order to lighten her. On 20 October Golconda reached Asses Ears and Whampoa anchorage five days later.

By 1840 or so, Golconda was still registered at Bombay, with Bell, master.

== Fate ==
On 20 August 1840, the 37th Madras Native Infantry Regiment sailed from Madras aboard Golconda, Minerva, Sophia, and Thetis, all bound for Canton, China. The last three arrived safely. Golconda disappeared. She was the headquarters ship for the regiment and carried its commander, Lieutenant-Colonel William Isaacs, 13 other officers, and some 350 soldiers and camp followers.

Thetis last saw Golconda on 13 September. Golconda had exited the strait and was entering the China Sea. Thomas King, Rounce, master, coming from Manila, saw Golconda on 18 September at 13°4′N 112°58′E, "all well".

Between 22 and 24 September there was a major typhoon that peaked on the 24th. On 29 September 1841 the Government ruled that all aboard Golconda had perished with an effective date of 24 September 1840.

== Post script ==
A program that aired on the BBC in 2000 described the fortuitous discovery of the wreck of Golconda on the Panagatan Cays (11.835697°N 121.293557°E), south of the Penagatan Atoll) in the Spanish East Indies. The identification was based on a belt buckle that identified the unit as one of the EIC's Madras regiments. This, and a musket butt plate with an inscribed GR (Grenadiers), identified the unit as the 37th Madras Native Infantry. (A British government document refers to the unit as the 27th Madras Native Infantry.)
