= David Clark (ship) =

History

East India CompanyUnited Kingdom
- Name: David Clark (or David Clarke)
- Namesake: A partner in the firm.
- Owner: Ferguson Bros., or Ferguson and Co.
- Builder: S. Teague, Clive Street, Calcutta
- Launched: 1816
- Fate: Broken up 1854; last listed 1854

General characteristics
- Type: Barque
- Tons burthen: 576, or 60073/94, or 608, or 60829/94 (bm)
- Length: 123 ft 9 in (37.7 m) (overall);
- Beam: 33 ft 3 in (10.1 m)
- Draught: 17 ft 2 in (5.2 m)

David Clark was launched in 1816 and may have been broken up at Batavia in 1854. She sailed one of the last voyages under charter to the British East India Company (EIC). In 1839 she carried mainly Scots assisted migrants to Australia, and was the first immigrant ship to sail from Great Britain directly to Port Phillip. In 1842 she transported more than 300 convicts to Hobart. She was last listed in Lloyd's Register in 1854.

== Career ==
In 1819 David Clark was registered at Calcutta with C.Miller, master, and Ramdulloll Day, owner. David Clarke, Miller, master, put into Batavia on 2 September 1818. As she was coming from China, a heavy gale on 30 June in the China Sea had dismasted her.

David Clark sailed between India and the Mediterranean, arriving in Malta in 1820, where a portrait was made, and then returning via Gibraltar to Bengal, arriving on 27 September 1821. She was involved in the EIC's military expedition to Burma in 1824 and 1825, and the EIC used her in the Arracan campaign as a hospital ship.

David Clark was still registered at Calcutta in 1829. Her master was J.B.Viles and her managing owner was T.Ferguson. She entered Lloyd's Register (LR) in 1830 with Viles, master, Ferguson, owner, and trade London–Calcutta. Her entry carries the remark "Partially repaired".

Captain Robert Rayne sailed David Clark from Howrah on 19 August 1833 and left Bengal on 20 September. By 14 October she was at Singapore, and she arrived at Whampoa Anchorage on 25 November. She reached St Helena on 4 May 1834, and arrived in the Thames on 6 June. Rayne's log of the voyage has survived.

David Clark underwent a survey in London on 16 August 1834 that recorded that she was built of teak with two decks, and had been sheathed in wood in 1829 and then in copper in 1833 at Calcutta.

On 20 September 1835, David Clark sailed from Singapore for Canton in company with Golconda, Sulimany, Duke of Lancaster, Mermaid, and the Danish ship Matadore. On 16 October during bad weather north of 19°0′N 117°20′E, Golconda ran into Matadore and almost cut her in half. Matadore sank after Golconda was able to rescue her crew. Golconda reached Asses Ears on 20 October and Whampoa anchorage five days later. At Whampoa she found that David Clark and the other vessels had arrived the day before.

She next sailed the London-Calcutta and Calcutta-China routes between 1834 and 1839 but in January 1839, having left London for India, had to put in at Cowes due to leaking; she discharged her cargo before going to Greenock for a refit.

She was under the command of Captain J.B. Mills when she left Greenock on 15 June 1839 carrying mainly Scots assisted immigrants. She arrived at Port Phillip on 27 October 1839.

This voyage to Melbourne from Scotland in 1839 with the first bounty immigrants was notable and well-recorded. As she departed on 13 June 1839, John Arthur piped her out to the tune of Lochaber No More. On 15 August 1839 she pulled in to Rio de Janeiro, where she stayed ten days. She then sailed directly to Port Phillip, arriving 27 October 1839. After a stay of about 7 weeks she departed on 19 December 1839 for Bombay.

=== Convict transport to Tasmania ===
In 1841 David Clarke transported convicts and troops to Australia. She departed Plymouth on 7 June, under the command of William B. Mills, and arrived in Hobart on 4 October 1841. She carried 308 convicts, one of whom died on the way. She sailed for Bombay in ballast on 17 October 1841.

=== Demise ===
David Clark's last voyage began on 7 September 1853, when she left from Manila to London, but heavy storms forced a return to Manila. After re-caulking, she sailed again on 23 September 1853 to London via Melbourne. However, she struck a reef during a storm in the Sunda Strait and diverted to Anjer, Java, on 31 October 1853, eventually reaching Batavia on 18 November, where she was condemned. Although Lloyd's List records her sailing to Singapore on 5 June 1854, she arrived in Surabaya on that date and returned to Batavia on 17 June, where she may have been broken up.

== Legacy ==
Perhaps because of the early transport of Scots to Australia, David Clark has been commemorated several times. A reunion of passengers in 1939 was extensively recorded in newspapers, while a ceremony marked the 175th anniversary in 2014. Passenger lists for the 1839 voyage are available.

== Illustration ==
"Ship David Clark Caming (sic) into the Harbour of Malta 1820"
