= List of islands in Shenzhen =

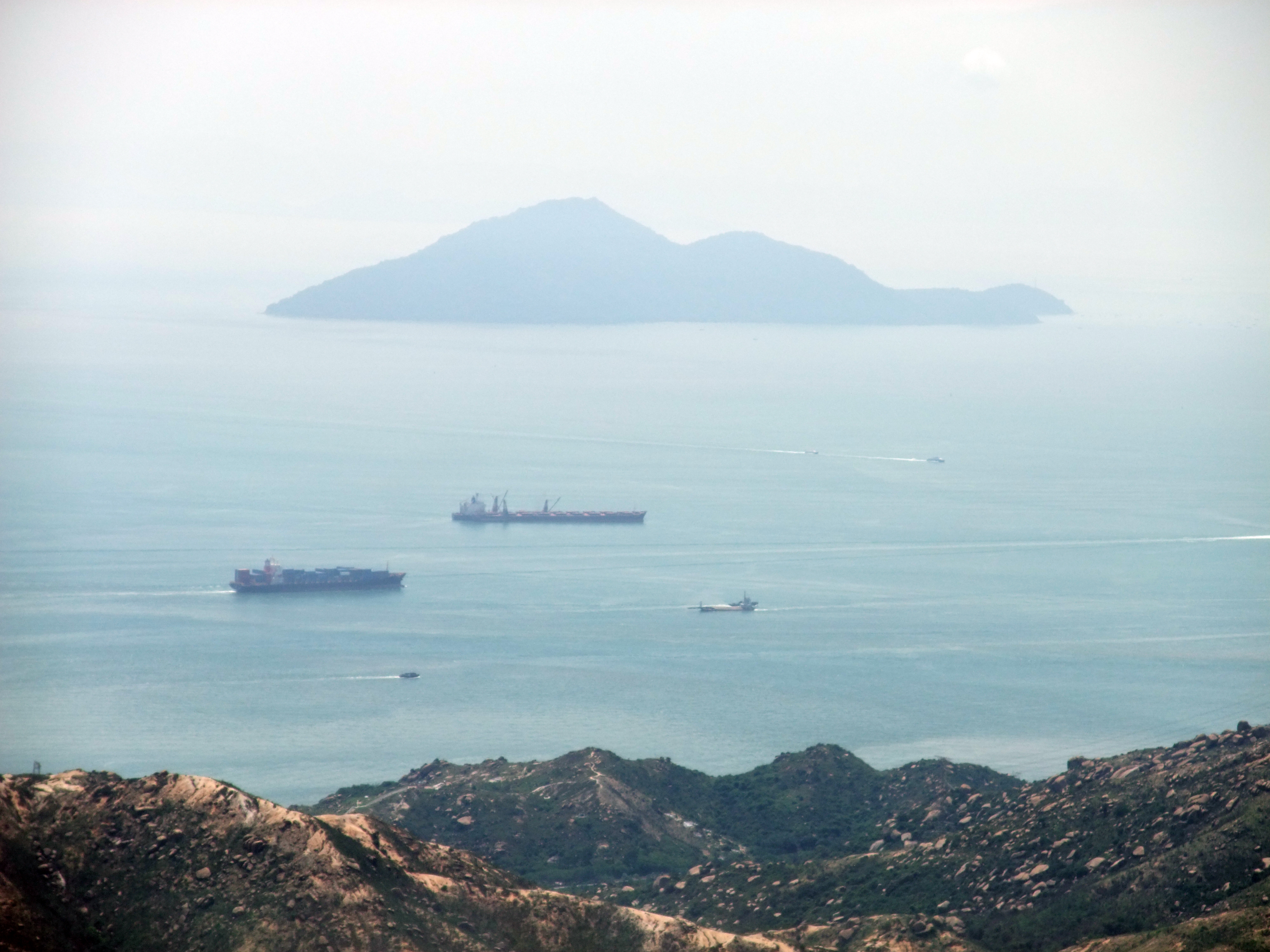
Nei Lingding Island

The city of Shenzhen, Guangdong, China is surrounded by numerous islands. Nonetheless, a significant portion of them falls under the territory of adjacent areas such as Hong Kong Special Administrative Region and Huiyang District, Huizhou. There are several islands under Shenzhen's jurisdiction, listed as follow.

== List ==
Island	Chinese name	District	Notes and References
Nei Lingding Island	内伶仃岛	Nanshan	Formerly administered by Zhuhai. Involved in the Battle of Tunmen
Dachan Island (Tai Shan Island)	大铲岛	Nanshan	
Xiaochan Island	小铲岛	Nanshan	
Mazhou	大小孖洲	Nanshan	
Laishizhou	赖氏洲	Dapeng	
Zhouzai	洲仔/九仔	Yantian	
Zhouzaitou	洲仔头	Dapeng	

== See also ==
- List of islands and peninsulas of Hong Kong
