= Damang Island =

Island in People's Republic of China

Native name: 大杧岛
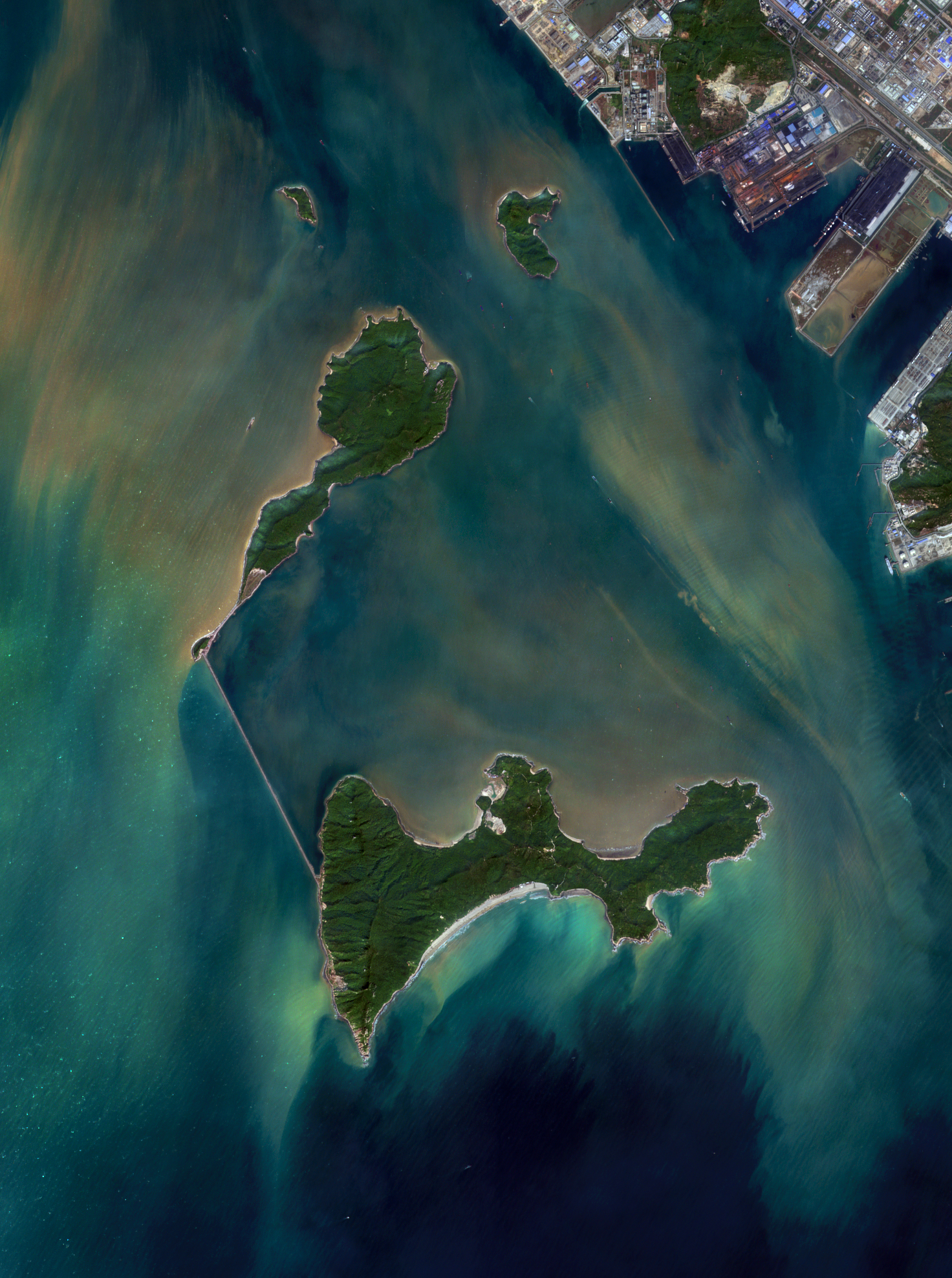
- Damang Island (top) in 2021. Breakwaters connecting the island and Hebao Island (bottom) was completed by 2012.

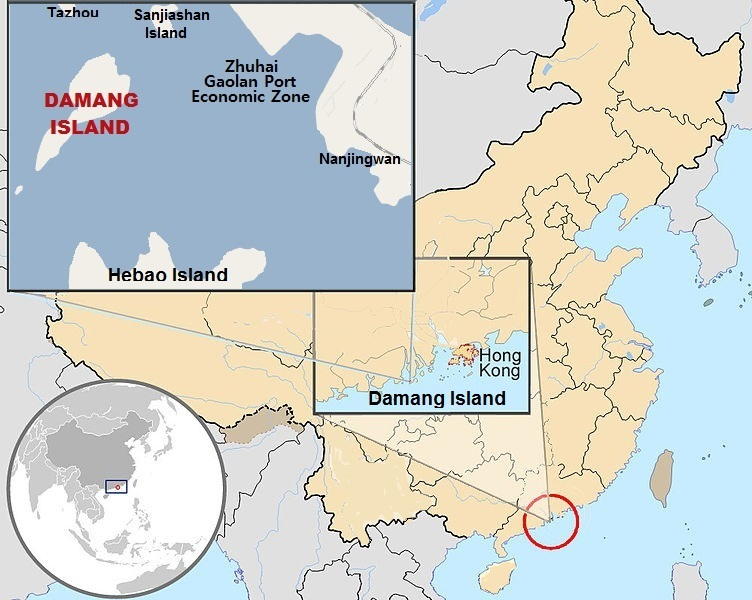
- Locator map of Damang Island in China

Geography
- Coordinates: 21°55′22″N 113°08′16″E
- Area: 5.2 km^{2} (2.0 sq mi)

Administration
- China
- Province: Guangdong
- Prefecture-level city: Zhuhai
- District: Jinwan

Demographics
- Population: Uninhabited

Damang Island
- Traditional Chinese: 大杧島
- Simplified Chinese: 大杧岛
- Literal meaning: Big Mango Island
Transcriptions
Standard Mandarin
- Hanyu Pinyin: Dàmáng dǎo
- Wade–Giles: Ta^{4}-mang^{2} Tao^{3}
Yue: Cantonese
- Yale Romanization: Daaih mōng dóu
- Jyutping: daai6 mong1 dou2

Damang Island (alternatively romanized as Damang Dao, Damang, Taimong, Ta-mang, Ta-wang) is an uninhabited island off the southern coast of Guangdong province in the People's Republic of China. It is located in the Pearl River estuary, South China Sea, 6 kilometres (3.7 miles) west of the Zhuhai Gaolan Port Economic Zone, 4.5 kilometres (2.8 miles) north of Hebao island and approximately 100 km west-southwest of Hong Kong.

Administratively, this sub-tropical island belongs to the prefecture-level city of Zhuhai, and may be considered part of the so-called Chinese Riviera. It has a total area of 5.2 square kilometres (2.0 square miles), measures 5.2 kilometres (3.2 miles) long and 2.5 kilometres (1.6 miles) wide. It serves as an ecotourism destination, and a research station for the study of its well-preserved ecosystem. The many varieties of rare plant and animal species in its tropical rain forest, include 600 kinds of ornamental plants, such as Podocarpus, Syzygium, Emblica, and 10 kinds of rare wild animals including deer, monkeys and turtles.

Its name is derived from the abundance of mango trees on the island.
