= Wanshan Archipelago Campaign =

1950 military campaign

Coordinates: 21.95°N 113.75°E

- Part of the Chinese Civil War
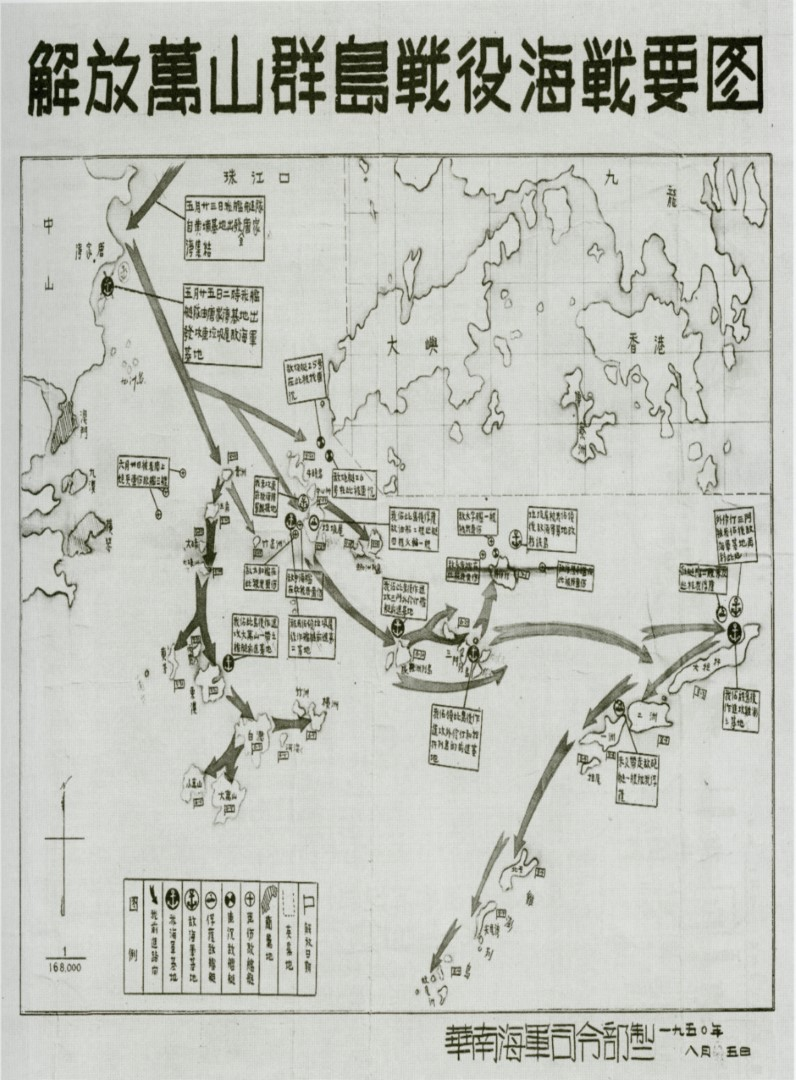
Date	25 May – 7 August 1950 (2 months, 1 week and 6 days)
Location	Wanshan Archipelago
Result	People's Republic of China victory
Territorial changes	People's Republic of China captures the Wanshan Archipelago

Belligerents
Republic of China (Taiwan)	People's Republic of China

Commanders and leaders
Qi Hongzhang	Hong Xuezhi

Strength
4,000; 40+ naval vessels	10,000; 24+ naval vessels

Casualties and losses
700+; 1 gunboat sunk; 1 gunboat severely damaged; 11+ naval vessels captured or scuttled	300+; 1 landing ship sunk; 1 gunboat severely damaged

The Wanshan Archipelago Campaign (Chinese: 万山群岛战役) was a campaign fought between nationalist and communist forces for the control of Wanshan Archipelago (Wanshan Qundao, 万山群岛), and resulted in communist victory. The archipelago consists of 48 islands strategically located at the mouth of the Pearl River, a chokepoint on the communication lines to Hong Kong and Macau. The largest island is the Laurel Mountain (Guishan, 桂山) Island, which was formerly known as Trash Tail (Lajiwei, 垃圾尾) Island. Other major islands include Outer Linding (Wailinding, 外伶仃) Island, Dong'ao (东澳) Island, Tri-gate (Sanmen, 三门) Island, Greater Ten-thousand Mountain (Da Wanshan, 大万山) Island, Lesser Ten-thousand Mountain (Xiao Wanshan, 小万山) Island, Burden Pole (Dangan, 担杆) Islands, and Jianpeng (佳蓬) Islands.

== Prelude ==
After Hainan Island had fallen into the communist hands, the nationalist 3rd Fleet withdrew to Wanshan Archipelago and together with the various nationalist units as the local garrison, the nationalists planned to blockade the mouth of the Pearl River and cutting off the maritime links between the mainland and Hong Kong and Macau. The nationalist naval commander-in-chief Gui Yongqing (桂永清) organized the Wanshan Defense Command, and named nationalist commander-in-chief of the 3rd Fleet Qi Hongzhang (齊鴻章) as the commander, who set up his headquarters on board the frigate Taihe (太和), the largest nationalist warship among more than three dozen nationalist naval vessels in the region, and the flagship of the nationalist 3rd Fleet. In response, the communist force decided to take the archipelago and eliminate the threat and crush the nationalist blockade of the mouth of the Pearl River. The communist deputy corps commander Hong Xuezhi (洪学智) was named as the commander of the Riverine Defense Force of the Cantonese Military Region to be in charge of the incoming operation, and the commander of force began to mass at Zhongshan on May 8, 1950, after a joint command headquarters was set up.

== Order of battle ==
Nationalist order of battle Around 4,000, including:

- 1 Marine regiment
- 1 battalion from the 208th Division of the Youth Army
- 6 infantry companies of various units
- Units of the Cantonese Assault Army
- The 3rd Fleet
  - ROCS Zhong Hai (中海艦)
  - ROCS Ying Kou (營口艦)
  - ROCS Hsin Yang(信陽艦)
  - ROCS Tai He (太和艦)
  - ROCS Yong Kang (永康艦)
  - ROCS Yong Ding (永定艦)
- The 2nd Patrol Boat Fleet
  - Gunboat Gao Yao (高要砲艇) 120 tons
  - Gunboat Yue Xiu (粵秀砲艇)
  - Gunboat Jiang Xiu (江秀砲艇) - possible later name of Yue Xiu (280 tons)
  - Gunboat Jiang Ding (江定砲艇) 280 tons
  - Gunboat Chang Jiang (長江砲艇) 100 tons
  - Gunboat Zhi Ping (治平砲艇) 25 tons
  - Gunboat 25 (砲25) 40 tons
  - Gunboat 26 (砲26) 86 tons
  - Gunboat 35 (砲35) 25 tons
  - Gunboat 38 (砲38) 25 tons
  - Patrol boat 29 (巡29) 10 tons
  - Patrol boat 31 (巡31) 10 tons
  - Patrol boat 32 (巡32) 10 tons
  - Patrol boat 33 (巡33) 10 tons
  - Patrol boat 34 (巡34) 10 tons
  - Patrol boat 35 (巡35) 10 tons
  - Patrol boat 84 (巡84) 10 tons
- Local guerilla gunboats

Communist order of battle Around 10,000 total, including:

- 2 regiments from the 131st Division of the 44th Army
- 1 Artillery battalion of the 132nd Division
- 1 Artillery company of the 130th Division
- 1 Artillery company of the South-central Military Region with 100 mm long range cannons
- 1 Artillery company from the 50th Army with recoilless guns
- 1 Artillery regiment of the Pearl River sub-Military Region
- Riverine Defense Force of the Cantonese Military Region (naval force)
  - 5 gunboats (including three respectively named Liberation, Vanguard, and Struggle)
  - 1 Landing ship
  - 10 Landing craft
  - 8 Transports
  - 40+ junks

== First stage ==
The communist task force sailed to Wanshan Archipelago at the dawn of May 25, 1950. Shortly before dawn, the advance guard of the communist force in charge of fire support reached the nationalist anchorage at the Laurel Mountain (Guishan, 桂山) Island. The communist gunboat Liberation, a former nationalist gunboat named Dancing Phoenix defected to the communist side commanded by its former nationalist commander, Captain Lin Wenhu (林文虎), a brilliant naval officer, launched a surprise attack on the nationalist naval force at the anchorage under the cover of darkness. Fully aware that his 25-ton gunboat was completely incapable of sinking its large opponents each displaced over a thousand tons, Captain Lin skillfully ordered his crew to concentrate fire on the superstructures of larger nationalist ships. Nearly every nationalist large warship in the anchorage had its bridge struck, and the flagship, the frigate Taihe suffered the most: nearly everyone on the bridge was either killed or wounded, and Qi Hongzhang (齐鸿章), the nationalist commander-in-chief was severely wounded himself. With the commander-in-chief severely wounded and most of his staff killed, the nationalist command in charge of both land and naval defense was thus effectively paralyzed. The confined space of the anchorage severely limited the maneuverability of the nationalist warships for fearing collision in the darkness, and the communist gunboat was able to utilizing the blind spots of the larger nationalist naval guns by fighting at extremely close quarter when engaging the larger nationalist ships after sinking a nationalist gunboat. In the meantime, two other communist gunboats, Vanguard and Struggle, managed to sink two nationalist gunboats east of Ox Head (Niutou, 牛头) Island, while two battalions of the communist landing force took Green Islet (Qing Zhou, 青洲) and Triangle (Sanjiao, 三角) Island.

After the sunrise, the nationalist fleet discovered that there was only a single small communist gunboat fighting them, and as the enraged nationalist sailors attempted to avenge the deaths of their comrades-in-arms, every nationalist naval vessel available joined the chase of the communist 25-ton gunboat Liberation. However, unbeknown to the nationalist fleet, it was drawn to a temporary but carefully and skillfully designed trap devised by the communist gunboat captain, who was luring his opponent away from the islands, thus opening the way for the communist landing force. Once the nationalist fleet realized its mistake, it was too late: although the nationalist fleet managed to severely damage the communist landing ship Guishan (桂山) in the chase, the communist landing ship nonetheless successfully beached itself and unloaded all of the landing force it carried.

The nationalist fleet was soon faced another dilemma: continue fighting the two communist naval vessels or saving the dying sailors, including the severely wounded commander-in-chief, who was out of consciousness by already this time. The loyal subordinates of the nationalist commander-in-chief chose not to let their commanding officer to die like many other wounded sailors, and speed away from the battlefield to seek better medical help in attempting to save those who were dying. Fearing additional communist naval units that may launch another round of attack, all other nationalist naval vessels retreated from the battlefield around an hour after the first shot was fired, protecting the wounded flagship from possible enemy attacks, thus enabling the 25-ton communist gunboat Liberation to safely return to its mainland base in a hero's welcome, but nationalist naval force nonetheless succeeded in killing the communist deputy political commissar of the flotilla on board the gunboat.

Unfortunately for the nationalists, due to the chaos of the battle and the damage to the communication gears on board most of its naval vessels, the decision for the naval units to retreat from the battlefield to save the dying sailors and commanders was not relayed to nationalist force on the island, where the defenders interpreted such retreat as fleeing and abandoning them, and the morale of the land force collapsed as a result. In the meantime, the communist troops landed on the island believed the same and their morale was drastically boosted and their pressure on the defenders intensified. The demoralized nationalist defenders had managed to hold on their positions until the nightfall, and then asked and was allowed retreated from the island under the cover of darkness.

Once the main anchorage of the Wanshan Archipelago, the Laurel Mountain (Guishan, 桂山) Island fell into the communist hands, many other islands fell in a domino effect. From May 25, 1950, thru May 28, 1950, Ox Head (Niutou, 牛头) island, Spider Islet (Zhi Zhou, 蜘洲), Dalu (大碌), Large Head Islet (Datou Zhou, 大头洲) and other small islets fell into the communist hands.

Nationalist account:

According to nationalist accounts from multiple commanders and captains including commander Qi Hongzhan of the third fleet, the events of the battle occurred differently. On the early morning of 25 May, the nationalist sentry gunboats 25 and 26 had made first contact with the communist assault force consisting of 5 gunboats and the landing craft Guishan on the northwest coast of Qingzhou island. Leading this force was the gunboat Vangaurd, the former sister of the nationalist gunboat Gaoyao, who was also in the area. Because it was dark gunboat 26 did not identify or engage until it was too late and soon she came under fire and as a result was set on fire. As the communist gunboats engaged gunboats 25 and 26 the landing craft Guishan and the gunboat Liberation split from the main force and headed towards the nationalist warships docked at Nanshanwei. The Guishan headed towards Nanshanwei and the Liberation towards the channel between Qingzhou island and Nanshanwei.

Upon seeing the skirmish where gunboats 25 and 26 were stationed, Commander Qi Hongzhan gave orders at 5:40 A.M. to his fleet to engage the enemy. Taihe and Zhong Hai intercepted the Guishan, The second patrol fleet gunboats led by Cao Yuanzhong and the flagship Yue Xiu headed towards gunboat 25 and 26's area northeast of Qingzhou island to engage with the communist gunboats harassing them. A few gunboats stayed back to defend Nanshanwei, including gunboats 38 and Zhiping which engaged the gunboat Liberation as it was making its way through the channel between Niutou island and Nanshanwei. Eventually they would head west assist gunboats 25 and 26 after heavily damaging the Liberation.

The Yongkang and Chang Jiang gunboats, stationed near the west Qingzhou and sanjiao islands to the west of Nanshanwei were ordered to stay on their patrol route and later engaged a communist landing force on west Qingzhou island.

After engaging and severely damaging the Guishan, Taihe and Zhonghai split, with Taihe heading north towards the communist gunboats to help the second patrol fleet and to engage the landing party at west Qingzhou island. Zhonghai headed south west to relieve Yongding from her patrol duties at Tong Ao island, so that she may support Yongkang. However, Zhonghai would also join in the battle.

The second patrol fleet would also join in repelling the communist landing at West Qingzhou island, however many communist landing boats have slipped through and landed at the island but not without taking heavy casualties. Another wave of landing craft were headed to the island but were repelled by the nationalist gunboats already there. It was at this segment of the battle that commander Qi Hongzhan had his arm injured and along with the many dead and injured on the Taihe, made the decision to leave the battle for aid. The commander of the Yongding took command of the area until the warship Xinyang could arrive and take over as the flagship.

After the campaign many of the patrol boats and a few gunboats would be abandoned or destroyed before the nationalists retreated from the archipelago. A few of the guerilla gunboats such as Guli (古利), Nanshan (南山) and Lidong (利東) (which may have been captured transports) would later be incorporated into the navy as gunboats.

== Second stage ==
On May 28, 1950, the nationalist naval force at the region was reinforced by 3 frigates, 2 landing ships, 4 minesweepers, and several gunboats newly arrived from Taiwan. The nationalist naval force cruised in waters north of Little Green Islet (Xiaoqingzhou, 小青洲) and Ox Head (Niutou, 牛头) island, attempted to bombard the communist positions on lands and the transport fleet. As the communist gunboats came out to meet them, the nationalist force still weary of previous naval engagement three days ago withdrew to open ocean, where the conditions favored the larger nationalist fleet because there was more space to maneuver. However, the communist gunboats did not pursue because the communists were fully aware their meek naval strength and once the mission of preventing the nationalist naval fleet from bombarding the communist assets was completed, the communists gunboats withdrew.

Although the bombardment mission ended early and thus was not a success, the nationalists were quick to devise a plan based on the experience to counterattack by wiping out the communist naval force after luring it out to the open ocean, and then retake the islands from the communists who would not have any naval support of their own. However, the communists also learned from earlier experience and reached the conclusion of not to engaging the much stronger nationalist naval force in the open ocean where the condition favored the latter. In attempt to search the communists, a detachment of the nationalist fleet ventured too close to shore and three ships suffered damages from communist shore batteries on the Large Head Islet (Datou Zhou, 大头洲) and Triangle (Sanjiao, 三角) Island on May 30, 1950. The nationalists consequently changed their tactics by letting the communists come to them at the waters favored the nationalists, instead of going to the communist's turf to seek out the communists in the coastal regions that favored the communists.

However, the communists had learned from the engagement as well and correctly deducted the nationalist objective, and thus made a plan of their own to counter that of the nationalist: instead of falling into the nationalist trap by fighting the way nationalists had wanted, the best way to engage the superior nationalist naval fleet was to utilize the long range shore batteries, and the much weaker naval force would act as auxiliary to the shore batteries.

== Third stage ==
On June 5, 1950, the communist force adopted the leapfrog tactic under the cover of shore batteries on adjacent islands and islets close by, succeeding in taking Dong'ao (东澳) Island, Greater Ten-thousand Mountain (Da Wanshan, 大万山) Island, and Lesser Ten-thousand Mountain (Xiao Wanshan, 小万山) Island, forcing the nationalist to withdraw to Outer Linding (Wailinding, 外伶仃) Island, Burden Pole (Dangan, 担杆) Island and other outlying islands. On the night of June 26, 1950, the communists had secretly set up the long-range shore batteries on Tri-gate (Sanmen, 三门) Island under the cover of darkness, and the communist gunboats were also deployed accordingly.

Unaware the communist's plan, the nationalist naval fleet carried out their original plan with the help of three more warships newly arrived from Taiwan, including destroyers. More than a dozen nationalist warships were deployed in waters near Outer Linding (Wailinding, 外伶仃) Island, Burden Pole (Dangan, 担杆) Islands, attempting to lure out the communist naval units. In the early morning of June 27, 1950, the hidden communist shore batteries suddenly opened up on the unsuspecting nationalist fleet, and defenders on the nationalist-held islands, the fierce fight lasted for more than five hours.

After numerous extraordinarily brave but completely futile attempts to approach the shore to support the nationalist defenders on land which resulted in one gunboat sunk, one destroyer, two large patrol craft two minesweepers and two gunboats damaged, it was painfully clear that the outgunned nationalist fleet must withdraw to the open waters further away in order to avoid annihilation by the superior communist artillery on land. The communist's tactic of using numerically superior land artilleries with greater range than that of nationalist naval guns proved to be a great success and prevented any nationalist naval attempt to support their comrades-in-arms on lands. With the cover of superior firepower from the lands, the communist was able to deploy the leapfrog tactic to take the remaining islands in the nationalist hands. By July 1, 1950, the Outer Linding (Wailinding, 外伶仃) Island fell into the communist hands, and by August 3, 1950, Burden Pole (Dangan, 担杆) Islands also fell. On August 4, 1950, Direct Bay (Zhiwan, 直湾), Northern Sharp (Beijian, 北尖), and Temple Bay (Miaowan, 庙湾) and other islands fell into the communist hands. Finally, on August 7, 1950, the communist campaign to take the Wanshan Archipelago ended in total victory after taking the Mosquito Tail Islet (Wenwei Zhou, 蚊尾洲)

== Outcome ==
The communist takeover of the Wanshan Archipelago eliminated the nationalist threat to its vital shipping lines to Hong Kong and Macau and crushed nationalist blockade of mouth of the Pearl River. The Wanshan Archipelago Campaign was the first combined army and naval operation for the communists and in addition to damaging and sinking nationalist ships, eleven nationalist ships were captured and they provided valuable local defense asset once they were completely repaired and returned to the active service in the communist fleet. One of the major contributor to the success was the correct tactics of not engaging the overwhelmingly superior opposing naval fleet, but instead, utilizing the numerically and technically superior shore batteries that the communists did enjoy to engage opposing naval targets that were outgunned. The largest island, the Trash Tail (Lajiwei, 垃圾尾) Island, was renamed Laurel Mountain (Guishan, 桂山) Island, in honor of the landing ship Laurel Mountain (Guishan, 桂山), the largest communist naval vessel participated in the conflict.

The nationalist control of the Wanshan Archipelago was mostly symbolic for political propaganda and the battle for the control of the archipelago was destined to fail for the same simple reason just like the earlier Battle of Nan'ao Island: the location was just too far away from any friendly bases and thus it was difficult to support in war, and when the support was available, it was rather costly. Although the largest island provided a relatively good anchorage, there was just not enough land to build any comprehensive facilities and infrastructures to support a fleet. As a result, many of the repairs that could be done locally had the comprehensive facilities and infrastructures been available would require traveling back to the distant friendly bases, thus greatly increased cost. When a major damage occurred, tugs were needed to tow the damaged vessel, and in the event of war when tugs could not be available, the damaged vessels had to be abandoned. In contrast, the communists had comprehensive facilities and infrastructures on the mainland and since the archipelago at the communist's doorstep, they could simply recover the abandoned nationalist vessels and repair them after taking them back to the mainland, and put them back into service to fight against the former owners of these vessels, as the case of the eleven naval vessels abandoned by the nationalists after the battle.

As for the blockade of the mouth of the Pearl River, it certainly caused difficulties for the communists. However, these difficulties could be overcome because there were and still are link between the mainland and Hong Kong, and Macau via land, and for the maritime traffic, the nationalist naval force could only cover the coastal region outside the effective range of the communist's land batteries and the communist could simply move a little deeper into the Pearl River to avoid the nationalist naval force. Though this did indeed increased the cost for the communist, the price tag for the operation of the naval task force performing this duty so far away from any support base was far greater comparatively speaking, because communist transportation was mostly by wooden junks that only required wind, while the modern nationalist navy required much more, such as fuel and maintenance supplies. Many nationalist strategist and naval commanders had pointed out this disadvantage and along with the geographically disadvantage (i.e. the lack of comprehensive facilities and infrastructures), wisely and correctly suggest to withdraw from the Wanshan Archipelago in order to strengthen the defense elsewhere, but their requests were denied because holding on something at the enemy's door step would have a significant symbolic meaning of great political propaganda value, but when the inevitable fall had finally occurred, the resulting disaster had negated any previous gains in political and psychological propaganda.

== See also ==
- Outline of the Chinese Civil War
- Outline of the military history of the People's Republic of China
- National Revolutionary Army
- History of the People's Liberation Army
- Chinese Civil War
