= Gaolan Island =

Island in Zhuhai, China

Coordinates: 21°55′00″N 113°15′25″E

Gaolan Island (Chinese: 高栏岛) is an island in Zhuhai, Guangdong, China. It spans an area of 34.39 km^{2} and has a coastline of 34.9 km. The island is famous for its beaches and rock paintings, dating to the Late Neolithic. It is located about 50 kilometers southwest of Zhuhai city.
