= Hebao Island =

Hebao Island 荷包岛
- Island
- Hebao Dao
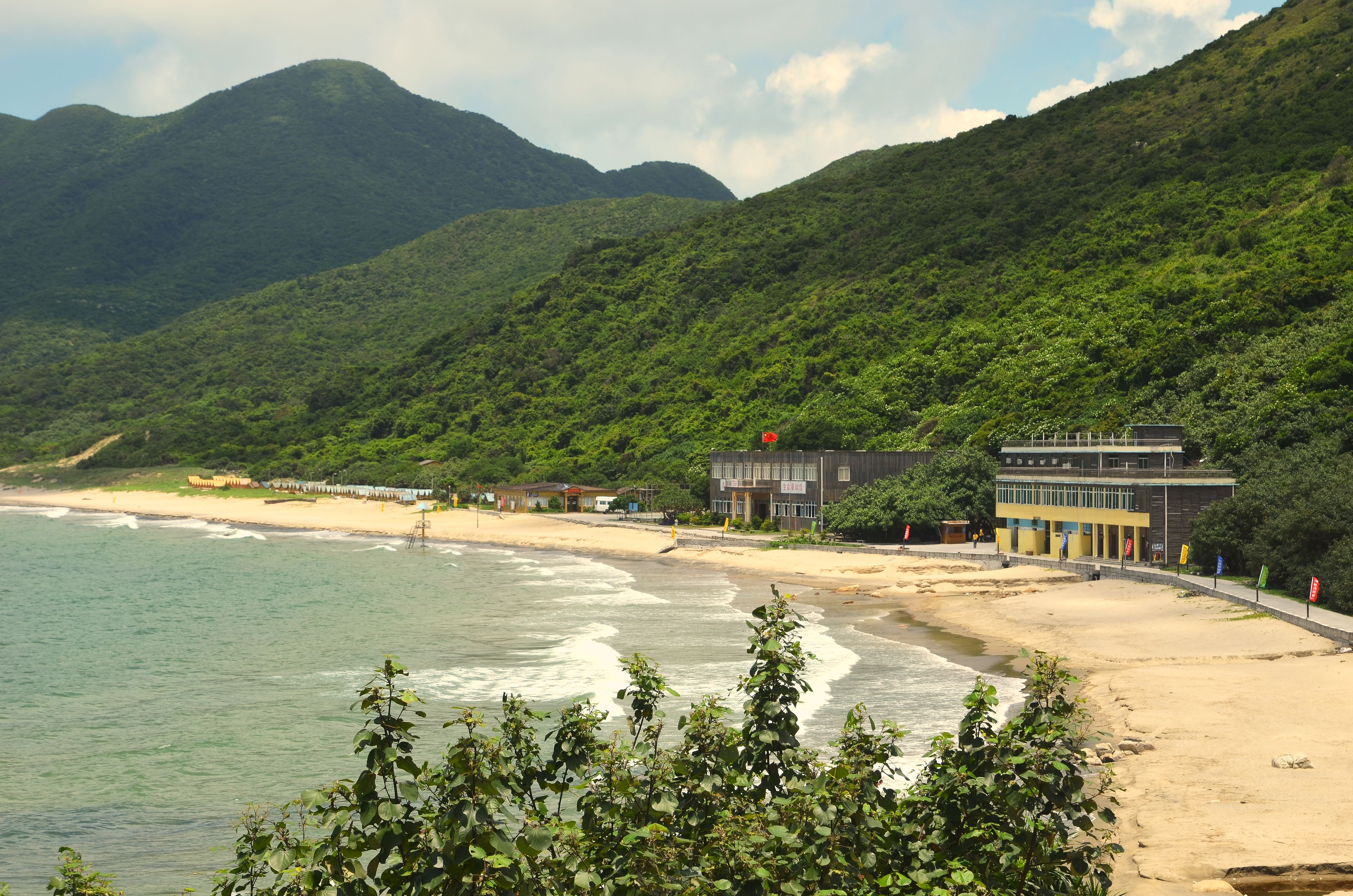

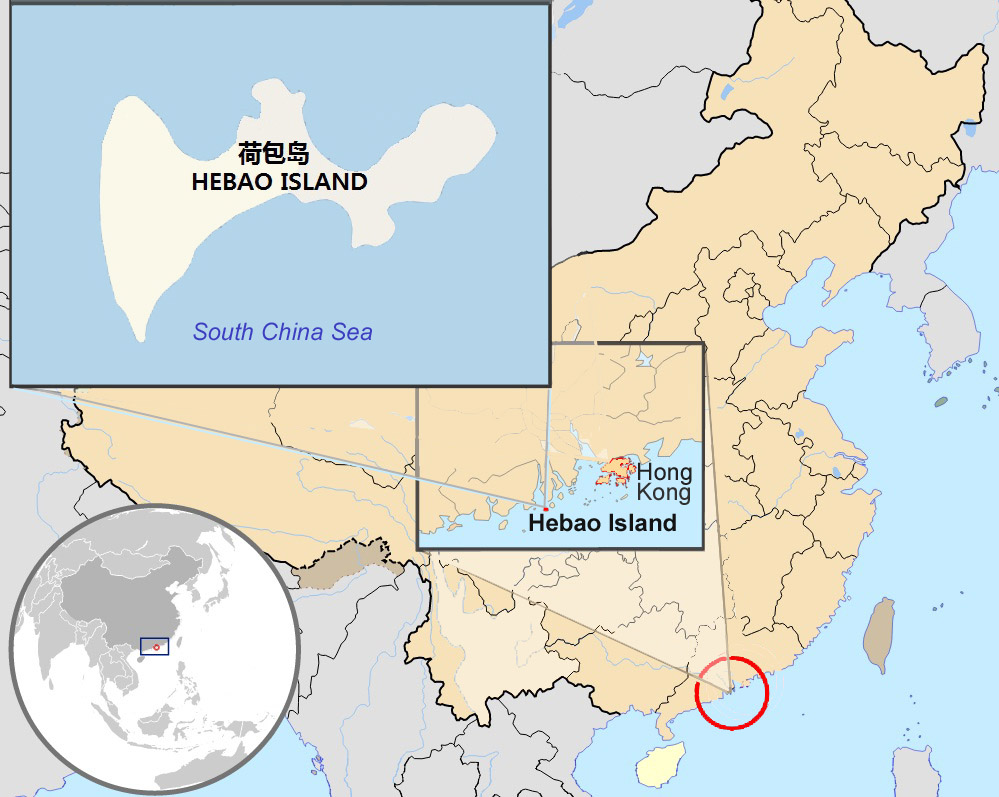
- Locator map of Hebao Island in China
- Coordinates: 21°51′52″N 113°09′33″E
- Country: China
- Province: Guangdong

Area
  - Total: 13 km^{2} (5.0 sq mi)

Hebao Island (Chinese: 荷包岛 Hébāo Dǎo, literally ‘Purse Island’, variants: Bullock Horn, Ho-pao, Ho-pao Tao, Kukok Island, Kukok Ngao Kok, Niu-chiao-shan and Niu-chio Tao) is a resort island off the southern coast of Guangdong province in the People's Republic of China. Located in the South China Sea, it is approximately 100 kilometers west-southwest of Hong Kong.

Administratively, this picturesque, sub-tropical island belongs to the prefecture-level city of Zhuhai, and so may be considered part of the so-called Chinese Riviera. It has a total area of 13 square kilometers, and its coast consists mainly of beaches, while the interior includes sub-tropical forest.

Four-mile long Great South beach (Chinese: 荷包岛大南湾沙滩) is the longest on the island.

== See also ==
- Damang Island
