= Xiaowanshan Dao =

Island of Guangdong, China

Coordinates: 21°57′N 113°41′E

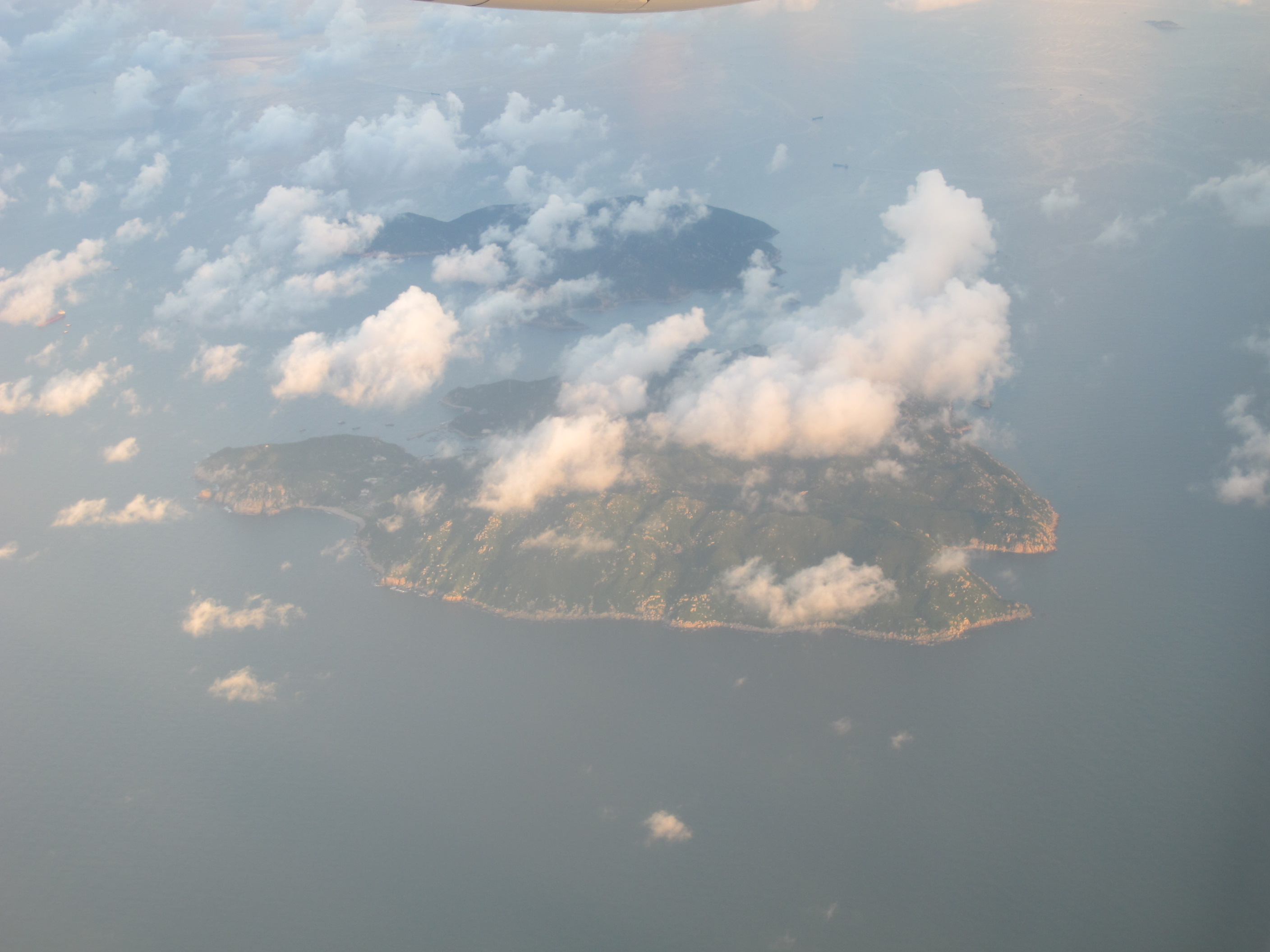
Dawanshan Dao (foreground) and Xiaowanshan Dao (background)

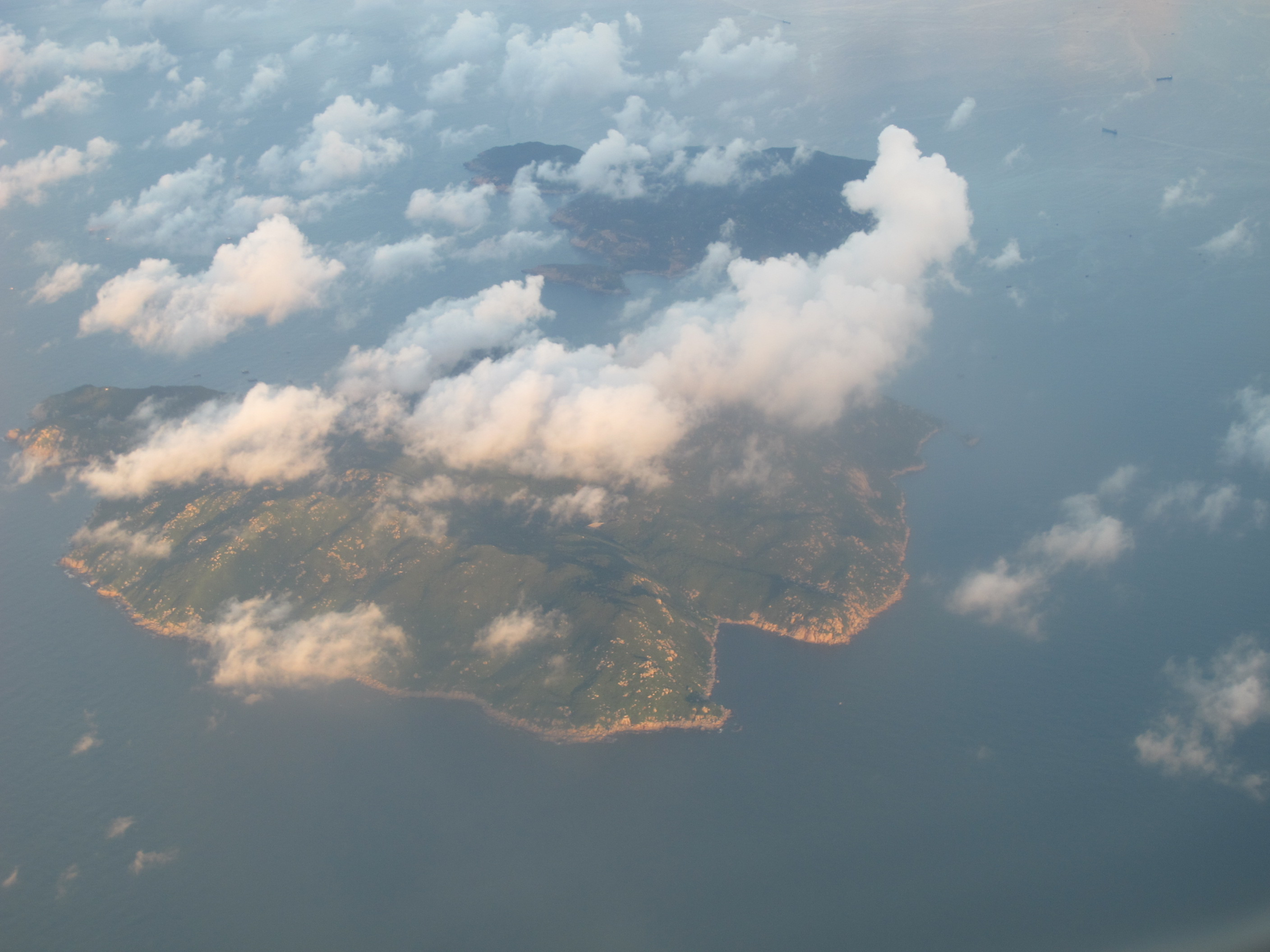
Dawanshan Dao (foreground) and Xiaowanshan Dao (background)

Xiaowanshan Dao (Chinese: 小万山岛; lit. 'Lesser Ten-thousand Mountain'), or Xiaowanshan Island, is an island in the southwest Wanshan Archipelago, offshore of Guangdong in China. Xiaowanshan Dao is located in the west of Dawanshan Dao. The two islands are separated by about 1,000 metres (3,300 ft). Xiaowanshan Dao has an area of about 4.35 square kilometres (1.68 sq mi).

== Geography ==
Xiaowanshan Dao has more sufficient freshwater than Dawanshan Dao. There are several small rivers on the island with water all year round. Nanpingmen (南屏门) is located just offshore of Xiaowanshan Dao and can be served as a waterway for the harbor which is being planned.

== See also ==
- Wanshan Archipelago Campaign
