= Dawanshan Dao =

Island of Guangdong, China

Coordinates: 21°56′33″N 113°43′40″E

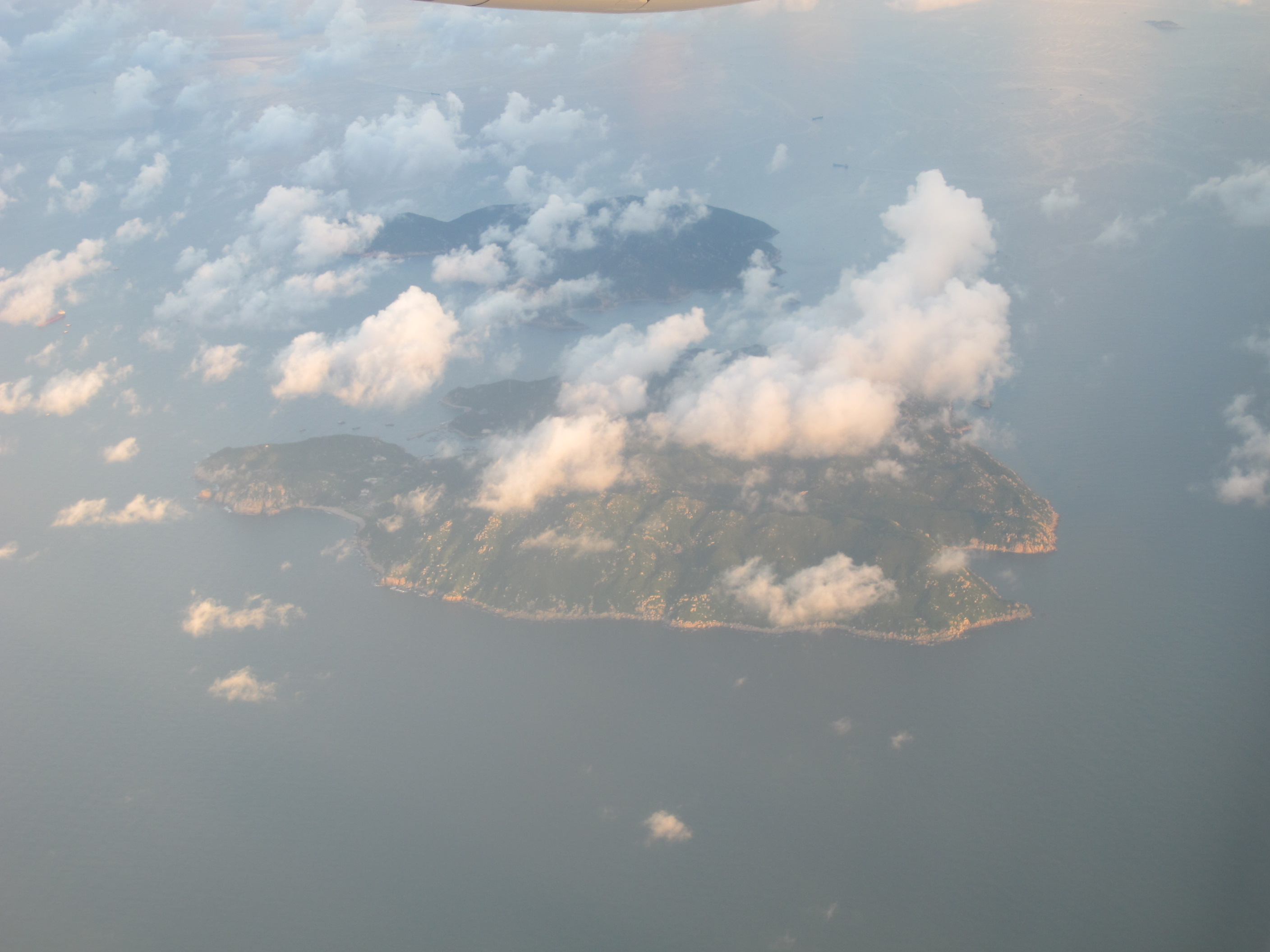
Dawanshan Dao (foreground) and Xiaowanshan Dao (background)

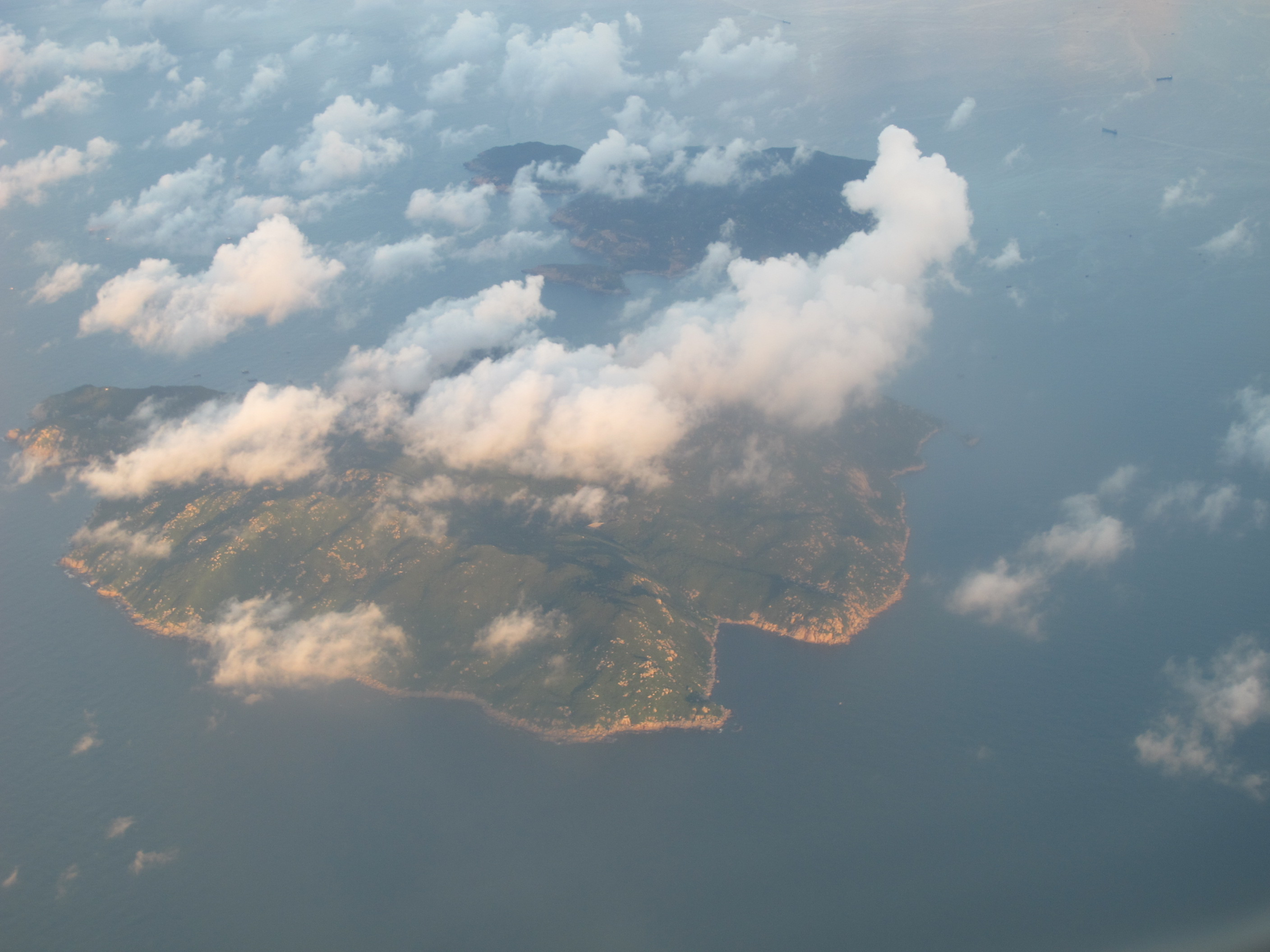
Dawanshan Dao (foreground) and Xiaowanshan Dao (background)

Dawanshan Dao (Chinese: 大万山岛; lit. 'Big Ten-thousand Mountain Island'), or Dawanshan Island, is an island in the southwest Wanshan Archipelago, offshore of Zhuhai, Guangdong in China. Xiaowanshan Dao (小万山岛; 'Small Ten-thousand Mountain Island') is located in the west of Dawanshan Dao. Dawanshan Dao has an area of 8.1 square kilometres (3.1 sq mi) and a population of about 3,000. The seat of Wanshan Town (万山镇) of Zhuhai is located on the island.

== Geography ==
Dawanding (大万顶) on Dawanshan Dao has an altitude of 443.13 metres (1,453.8 ft).

== Economy ==
Dawanshan Dao is located in one of the major fishing areas of China. However, Perna viridis, a species of green mussel, was found to be contaminated by HCHs, DDTs, and PCBs. Dawanshan Dao has reservoirs because of the lack of sufficient freshwater.

== Transportation ==
Dawanshan Dao is accessible through ferry service from the Xiangzhou Northern Wharf (香洲北堤码头) of Zhuhai.

== See also ==
- Wanshan Archipelago Campaign
