= Dachan Island =

Island in Shenzhen, China

Native name: 大铲岛
- Location within China

Geography
- Location: Qianhai Bay, Nanshan, Shenzhen, China
- Coordinates: 22°30′43″N 113°50′42″E
- Area: 0.65 km^{2} (0.25 sq mi)
- Area rank: 2nd in Shenzhen

Dachan Island
- Simplified Chinese: 大铲岛
- Traditional Chinese: 大鏟島
Transcriptions
Standard Mandarin
- Hanyu Pinyin: Dà Chǎn Dǎo
Yue: Cantonese
- Jyutping: daai6 caan2 dou2

Dachan Island (Chinese: 大铲岛) is an island in Shenzhen, China. Located within Qianhai Bay, it is the second largest island in Shenzhen. Administratively it belongs to Nanshan District.

== See also ==
- Nei Lingding Island
