= Guishan Island (China) =

Island of Zhuhai, China

Coordinates: 22°08′03″N 113°49′40″E

Native name: 桂山島
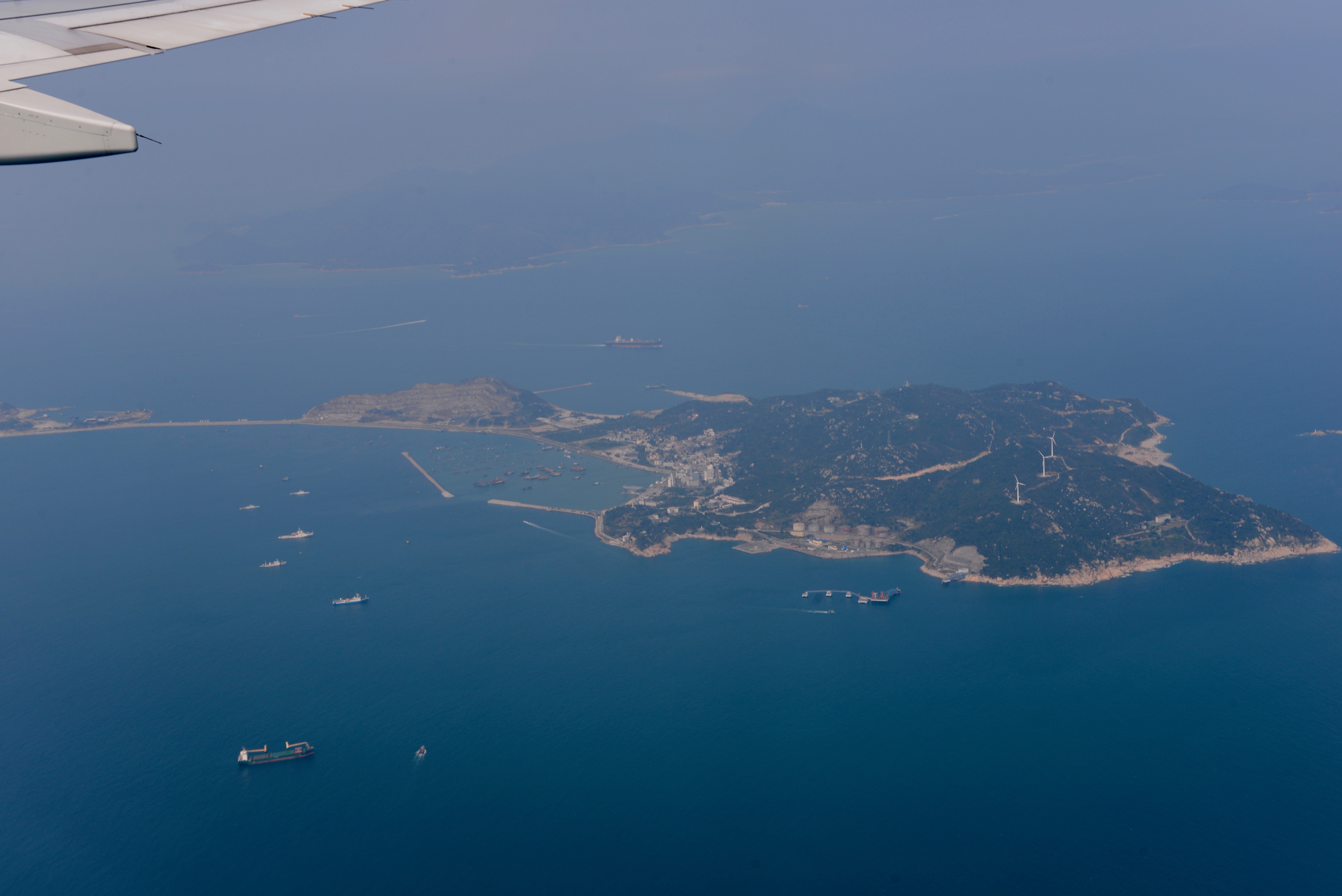
- Guishan Island as seen from the air (2019)
- Interactive map of Guishan Island

Geography
- Location: Xiangzhou District, Guangdong Province, China
- Archipelago: Wanshan Archipelago
- Adjacent to: Pearl River
- Area: 10 km^{2} (3.9 sq mi)

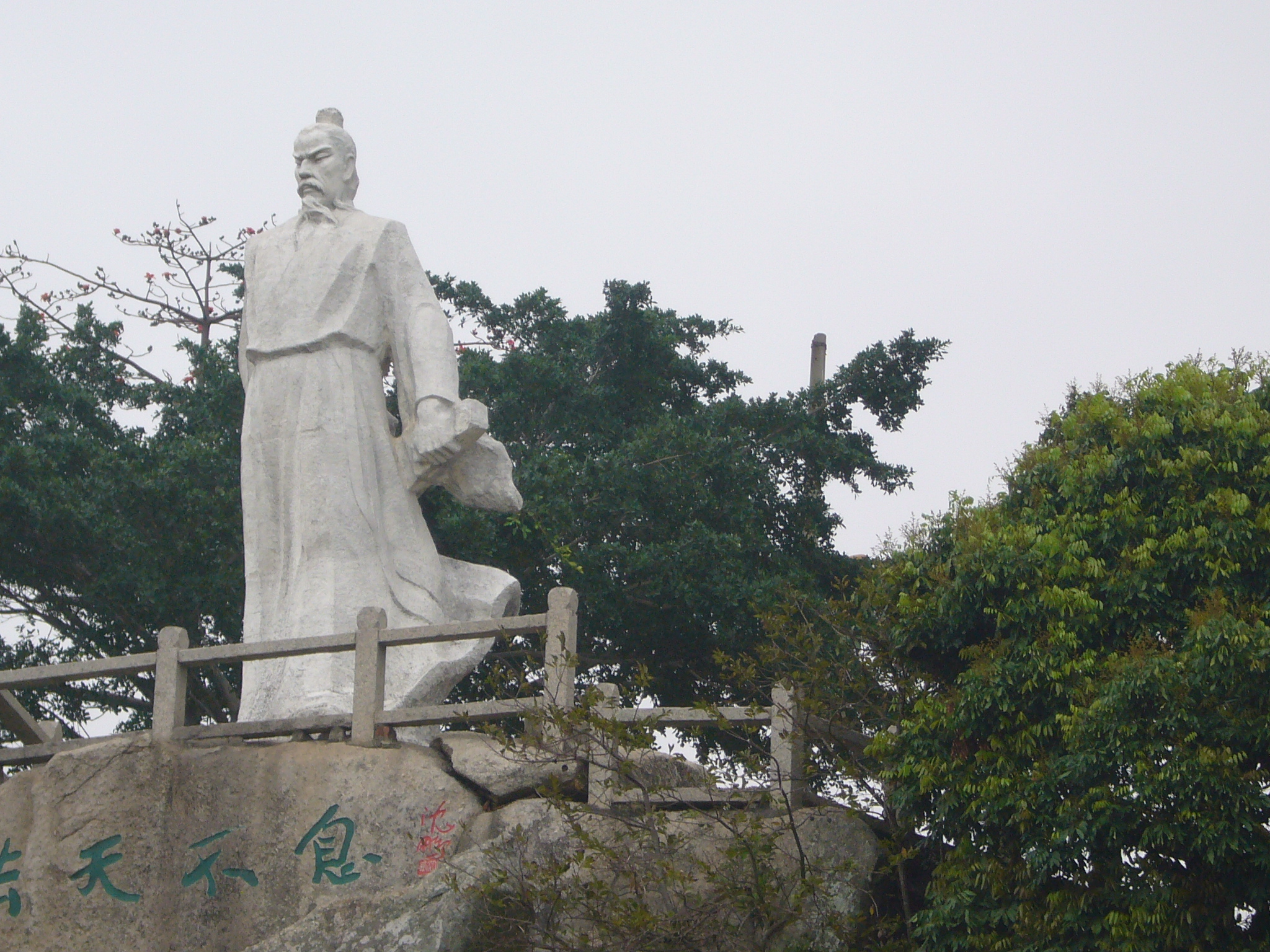
Wen Tianxiang statue on Guishan.

Guishan Island is an island in the Pearl River estuary near Zhuhai, China and Lantau Island. The island is part of the Wanshan Archipelago and is administrated as part of Xiangzhou District of Guangdong Province.

== Geography ==
Guishan is an island in the Pearl River estuary. The island is around 10 square kilometres (3.9 sq mi) large and is located near other islands in the estuary, notably Lantau and the Soko Islands. The island is variously described as being part of Hong Kong and Zhuhai, with most sources favoring the latter. The island's west side features shallow water while its east features deeper water.

== Population ==
Guishan is inhabited by several thousand people living in two settlements and is administrated as part of Zhuhai.

== Future development ==
Located in the highly trafficked Pearl River estuary and included in the heavily populated Pearl River delta, Guishan has been considered for a large-scale development project. The project is intended to provide additional living space and has earmarked an estimated 60 square kilometres (23 sq mi) of land for land reclamation. The stated intent of the project is to reclaim land on which facilities (such as pensioner housing, correctional facilities, and container terminals) can be established, with the eventual goal being for these new constructions to replace similar facilities in Hong Kong to free up space in the city. As opposed to similar development projects on Lantau island, the reclamation and construction project on Guishan will fall under the jurisdiction of Zhuhai and not Hong Kong. This administrative difference could also allow the Chinese government to directly invest in the project, and raises issues over Hong Kong's sovereignty. A bridge or underwater tunnel is planned to span the 5 kilometres (3.1 mi) distance between Guishan and Lantau, with other proposals stating the island could be connected to the Hong Kong–Zhuhai–Macau Bridge. The island has also been considered as a potential tourism hub.

The development of Guishan island is part of a wider plan to reclaim islands in the Pearl River estuary; this decades-long project is slated to promote the development of Dazhi Zhou (大蜘洲), Xiaozhi Zhou (小蜘洲), Qing Zhou (青洲), and Sanjiaoshan islands (三角山岛).

== See also ==
- Wanshan Archipelago Campaign
