= Wanshan Archipelago =

Wanshan / Guishan / Dangan 万山镇 / 桂山镇 / 担杆镇
- Town(s)
- 万山海洋开发试验区
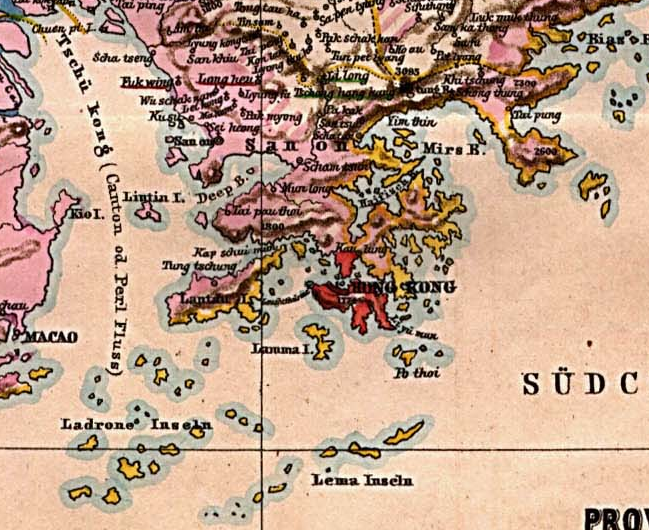
- Coordinates: 21°59′42″N 113°45′54″E
- Country: China
- Province: Guangdong
- City: Zhuhai
- District: Xiangzhou

Area
  - Total: 86 km^{2} (33 sq mi)

Population
  - Total: 4,813
  - Density: 56/km^{2} (140/sq mi)
- Time zone: UTC+8 (China Standard)
- Website: http://www.wanshan.gov.cn/

Wanshan Archipelago
- Simplified Chinese: 万山群岛
- Traditional Chinese: 萬山羣島
- Literal meaning: Myriad (Note: As with the Greek μυρίος, the Chinese word 萬 refers variously to the exact number 10,000 and any indiscriminately large amount.) Islands Archipelago
Transcriptions
Standard Mandarin
- Hanyu Pinyin: Wànshān Qúndǎo
- Wade–Giles: Wan-shan Ch'ün-tao
Yue: Cantonese
- Jyutping: Maan^{6}-saan^{1} Kwan^{4}-dou^{2}

The Wanshan Archipelago, formerly known as the Ladrones Islands, is a 104-island archipelago that is a part of Xiangzhou District in Zhuhai, Guangdong Province, China.

== Administration ==
Most of the islands of the archipelago are in the Wanshan Marine Development Experimental Zone (万山海洋开发试验区) which consist of three towns: Guishan Town (桂山镇), Dangan Town (担杆镇) and Wanshan Town (万山镇).

Before Chu-Hai County was created in 1953, the islands were part of Po-On County.

== Geography ==
The islands are situated in the South China Sea, to the south of the opening of the Pearl River estuary and Hong Kong.

The archipelago includes several groups of islands. The western group, located south of the Pearl River estuary and Lantau Island, was formerly known to Europeans as the Ladrones, from the Spanish for "thieves". It comprises Greater Wanshan, Guishan, and Wai Dangling Islands and the Zhizhou, Sanmen, and Aizhou groups. The eastern group, located south of Hong Kong Island, was known as the Lema Islands. Today, they are known as the Jiapeng Liedao and Dangan Liedao, respectively.

The largest island, Dangan, features mountainous terrain similar to Hong Kong.

=== List of islands ===
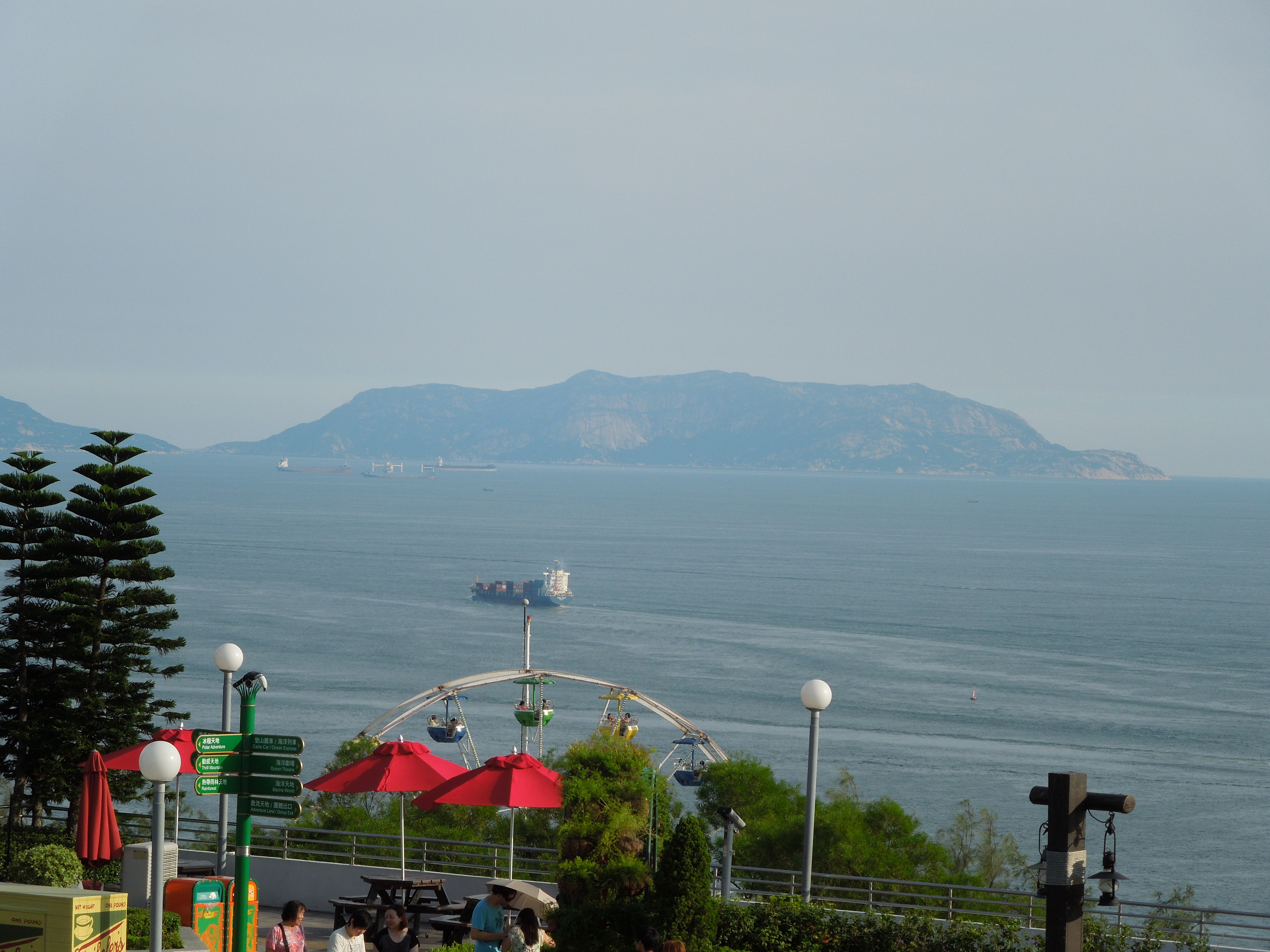
Erzhou Dao, seen from Ocean Park Hong Kong.

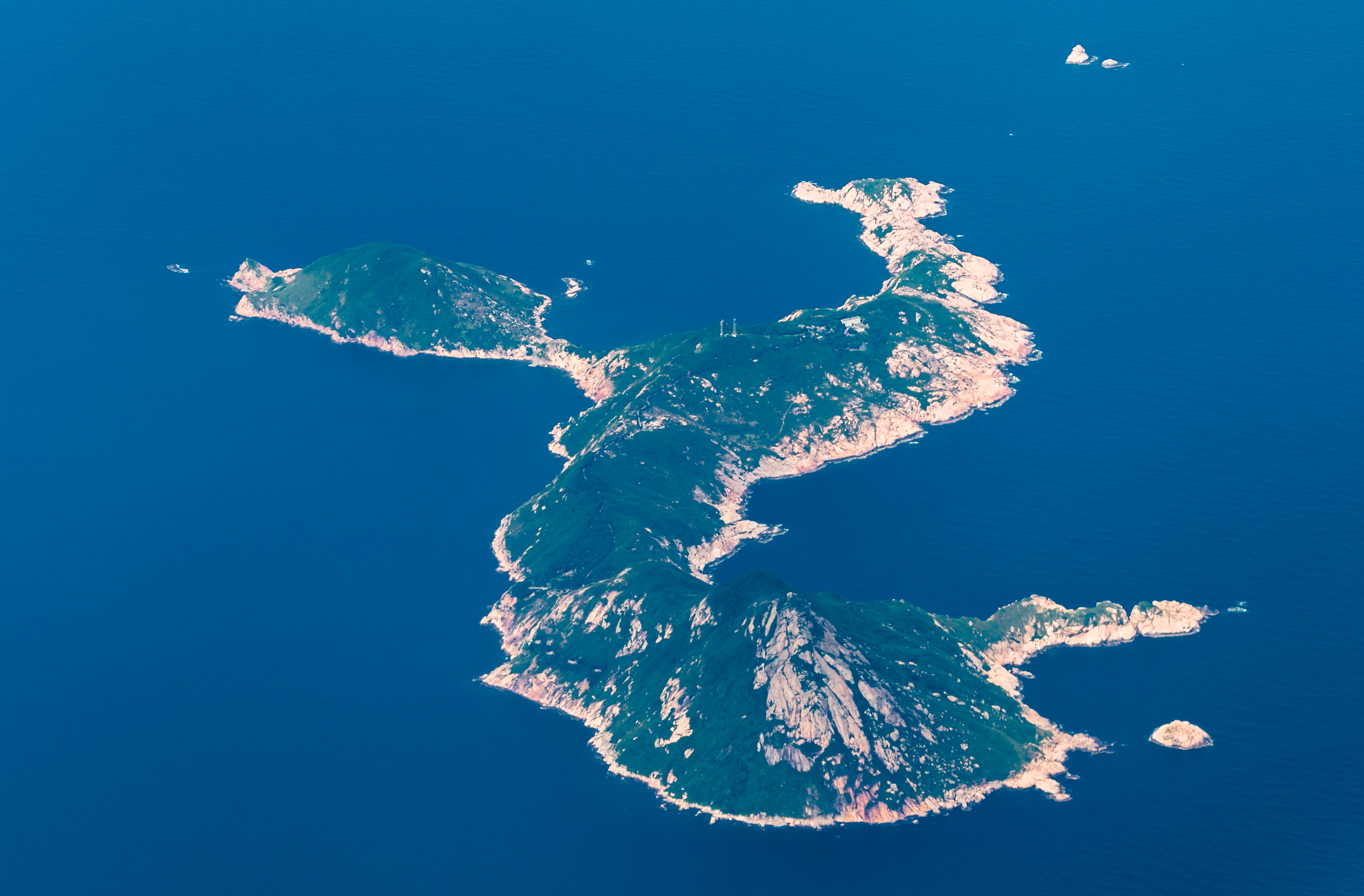
Beijian Dao

Islands of the archipelago include:

Dangan Liedao (担杆列岛), the eastern group of Wanshan archipelago, and the eastern half of the former Lema Islands chain

- Dangan Dao (担杆岛), 13.2 square kilometres (5.1 sq mi) in area and the largest of the islands; 200 permanent residents mainly along Zhangmu Bay and Hengkeng.
- Erzhou Dao (二洲岛), 8.15 square kilometres (3.15 sq mi)
- Zhiwan Dao (直湾岛), 4.5 square kilometres (1.7 sq mi)
- Xidan Dao (细担岛), 0.85 square kilometres (0.33 sq mi)

Jiapeng Liedao (佳蓬列岛), the southern group of Wanshan archipelago, and the western half of the former Lema Islands chain

- Eyan Shi Dao (枙咽石岛, O-yen Shih). A 39 metres (128 ft) high islet about 1 mi (1.6 km) north of Beijian Dao.
- Beijian Dao (北尖岛), 3.17 square kilometres (1.22 sq mi). Two peaks rising almost perpendicularly to a height of 300 metres (980 ft) on the southwestern end of the island, are known as Asses' Ears.
- Miaowan Dao (庙湾岛), 1.46 square kilometres (0.56 sq mi) in area. 240 metres (790 ft) high. It has a small population of fishermen.
- Shan Zhou (杉洲), 0.16 square kilometres (0.062 sq mi)
- Wanzhou Dao (湾洲岛)
- Huangmao Zhou (黃茅洲)
- Ping Zhou (平洲), 0.144 square kilometres (0.056 sq mi)
- Wenwei Zhou (蚊尾洲; 'Mosquito Tail Island', also Gap Rock in English), 0.022 square kilometres (0.0085 sq mi). The small island is in the form of two hillocks, about 24 to 30 m (80 to 100 ft) high, and the island derives its English name from the gap between them. The Gap Rock Lighthouse (蚊尾洲燈塔) on the island was built to serve as a navigation aid to vessels sailing to Hong Kong. It was built by a Hong Kong contractor and partly funded by the Imperial Qing Government for both construction and maintenance costs. Besides the lighthouse it had separate European and Chinese living quarters, telegraph and storage rooms. It came into operation in 1892 under Hong Kong control (island still under Chinese sovereignty) staffed by British lighthouse keeper and Chinese assistants. The lighthouse lenses and windows were damaged by typhoons in 1893 and 1905, the keepers eventually abandoned the site, civil war in China left it in ruins by the 1930s and 1940s. Taken over in 1949 by the Communists in Beijing, lighthouse was restored in 1986 with solar panels and fully automated. A small helipad was added in by the Chinese.

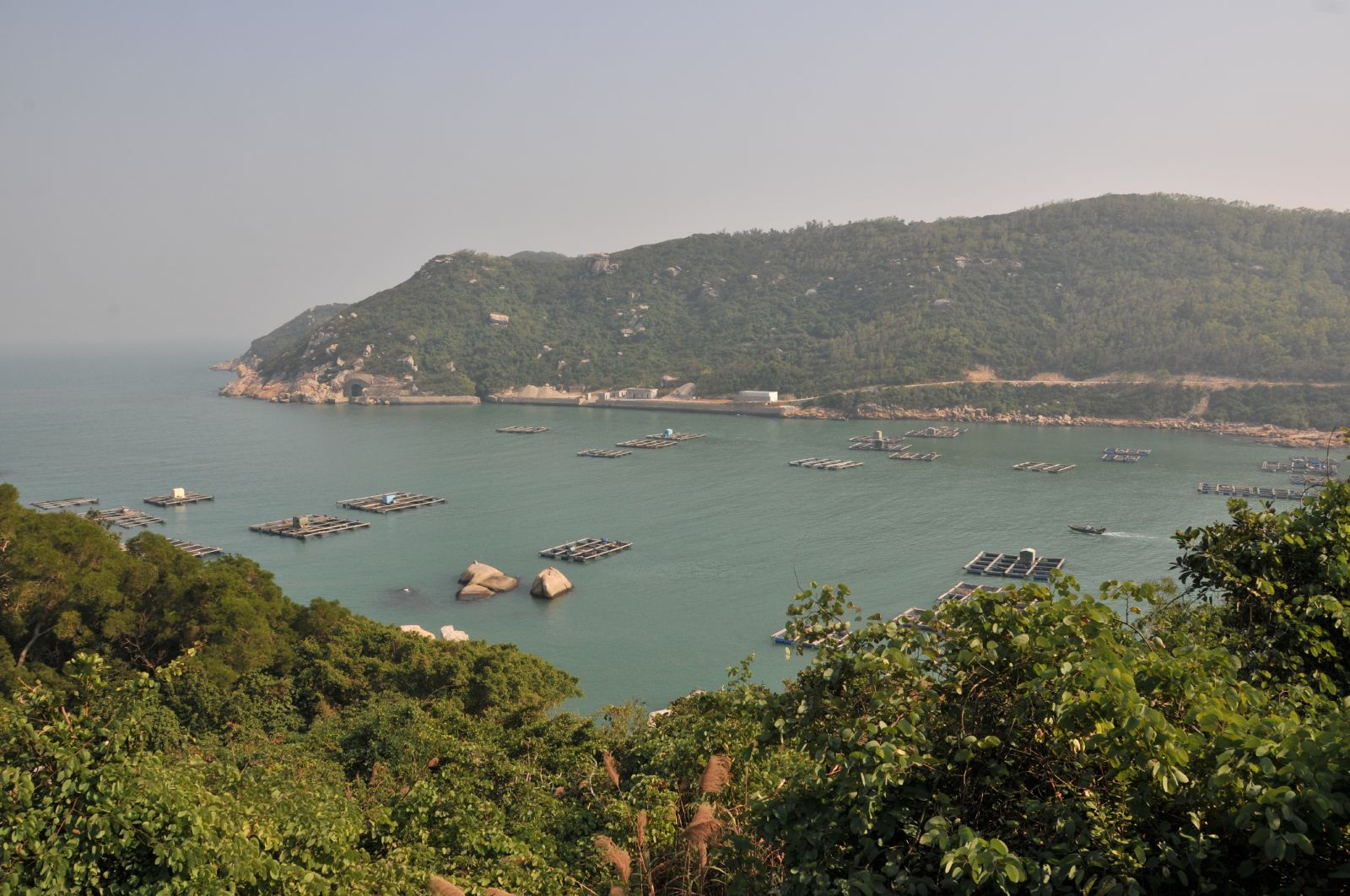
Dong'ao Dao

Southwestern group:

- Dawanshan Dao (大万山岛), 8.07 square kilometres (3.12 sq mi). The seat of Wanshan Town (万山镇) of Zhuhai is located on the island
- Xiaowanshan Dao (小万山岛), 4.35 square kilometres (1.68 sq mi).
- Baili Dao (白沥岛), 7.94 square kilometres (3.07 sq mi)
- Dong'ao Dao (东澳岛), 4.62 square kilometres (1.78 sq mi) in area with population of 500. Club Med opened a holiday resort on the island in 2014.
- Heng Zhou (横洲), 0.54 square kilometres (0.21 sq mi)
- Zhu Zhou (竹洲; 'Bamboo Island'), 1.66 square kilometres (0.64 sq mi)
- Gui Zhou (贵洲), 0.32 square kilometres (0.12 sq mi)
- Dalie Dao (大烈岛), 0.36 square kilometres (0.14 sq mi)
- Huangmao Dao (黄茅岛), 1.08 square kilometres (0.42 sq mi)

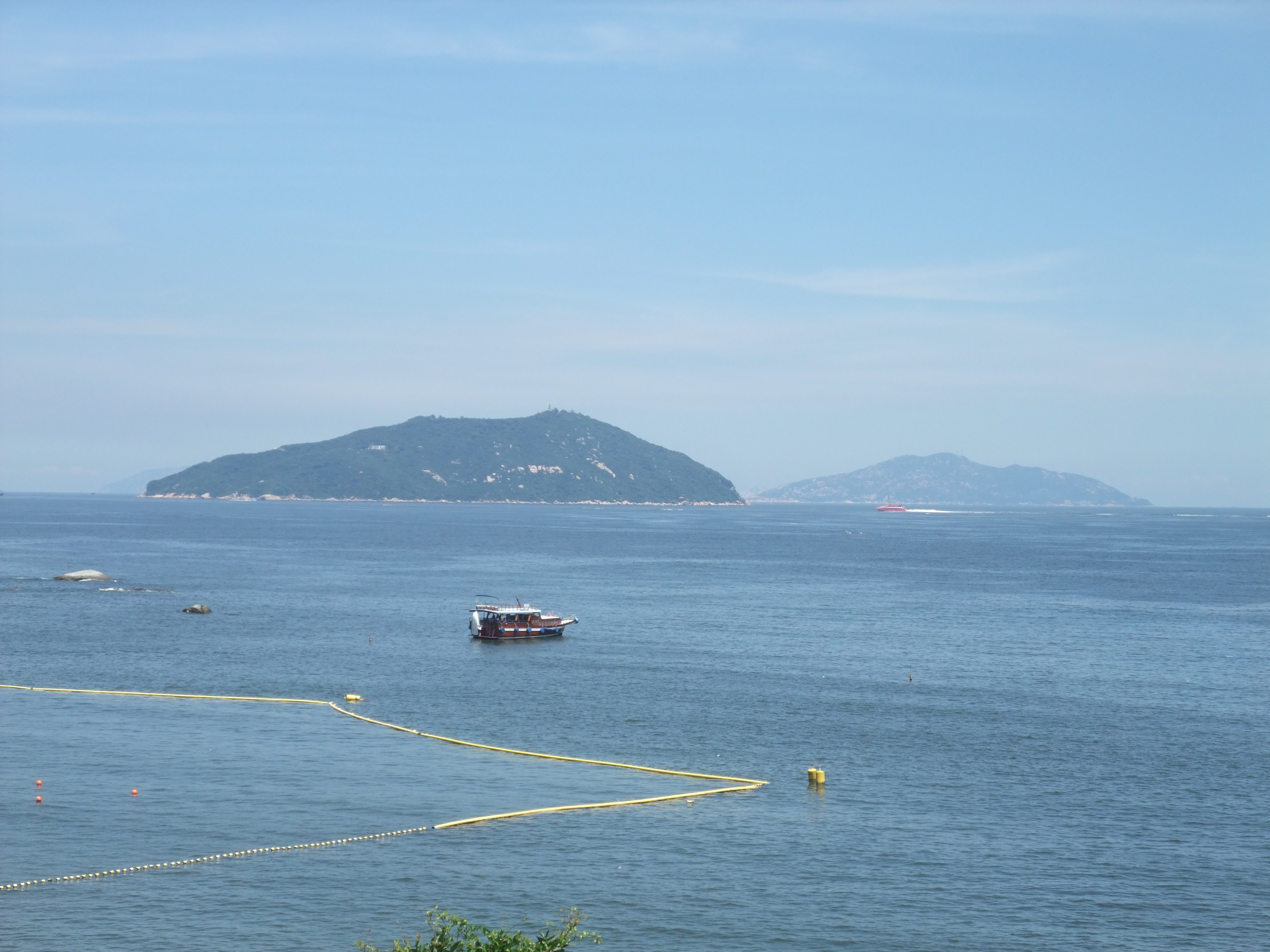
Shek Kwu Chau (left), an island of Hong Kong and Wai Lingding Dao (right), part of the "Central group" of Wanshan Archipelago.

Central group, located south of Lantau:

- Wai Lingding Dao (外伶仃岛), 3.7 square kilometres (1.4 sq mi) in area and a tourist attraction with natural sites (Dangandao Provincial Nature Reserve) and temples. The seat of Dangan Town (担杆镇) of Zhuhai is located on the island
- Sanmen Liedao (三门列岛)
  - Hei Zhou (黑洲)
  - Henggang Dao (橫崗島), 0.74 square kilometres (0.29 sq mi)
  - Sanmen Dao (三门岛), 0.98 square kilometres (0.38 sq mi)
  - Sanmen Zhou (三门洲)
  - Yuangang Dao (圆岗岛), 0.016 square kilometres (0.0062 sq mi)
  - Zhuwantou Dao (竹湾头岛), 0.33 square kilometres (0.13 sq mi)
- Aizhou Liedao (隘洲列岛)
  - Ai Zhou (隘洲), 1.2 square kilometres (0.46 sq mi)
  - Ai Zhou Zi (隘洲仔; 'baby Aizhou'), 0.6 square kilometres (0.23 sq mi)

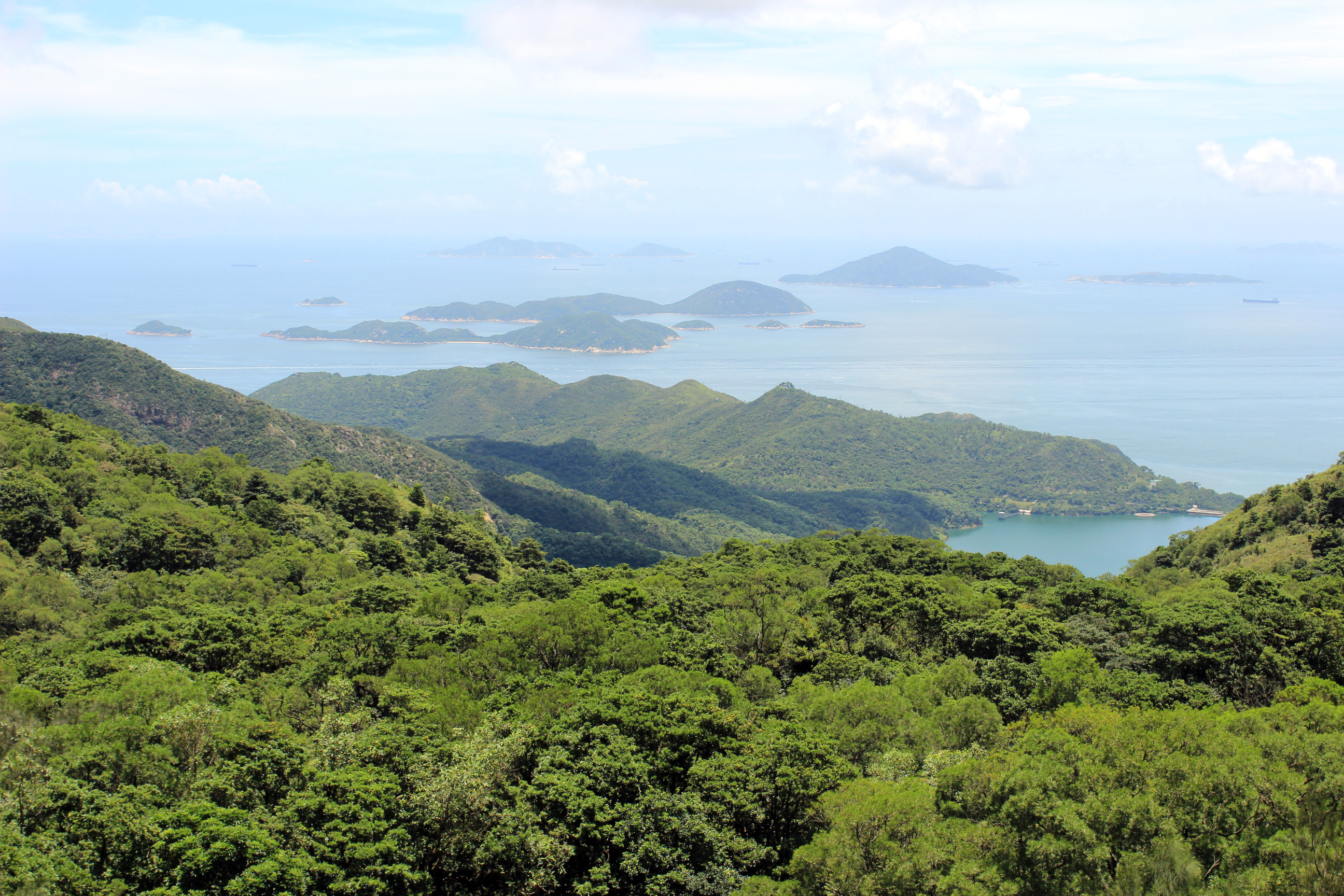
View from Tian Tan Buddha in Hong Kong. The closest islands are the Soko Islands, part of the territory of Hong Kong. The four most distant islands are part of the Wanshan Archipelago. From left to right: Ai Zhou, Ai Zhou Zi, Dazhi Zhou, Xiaozhi Zhou.

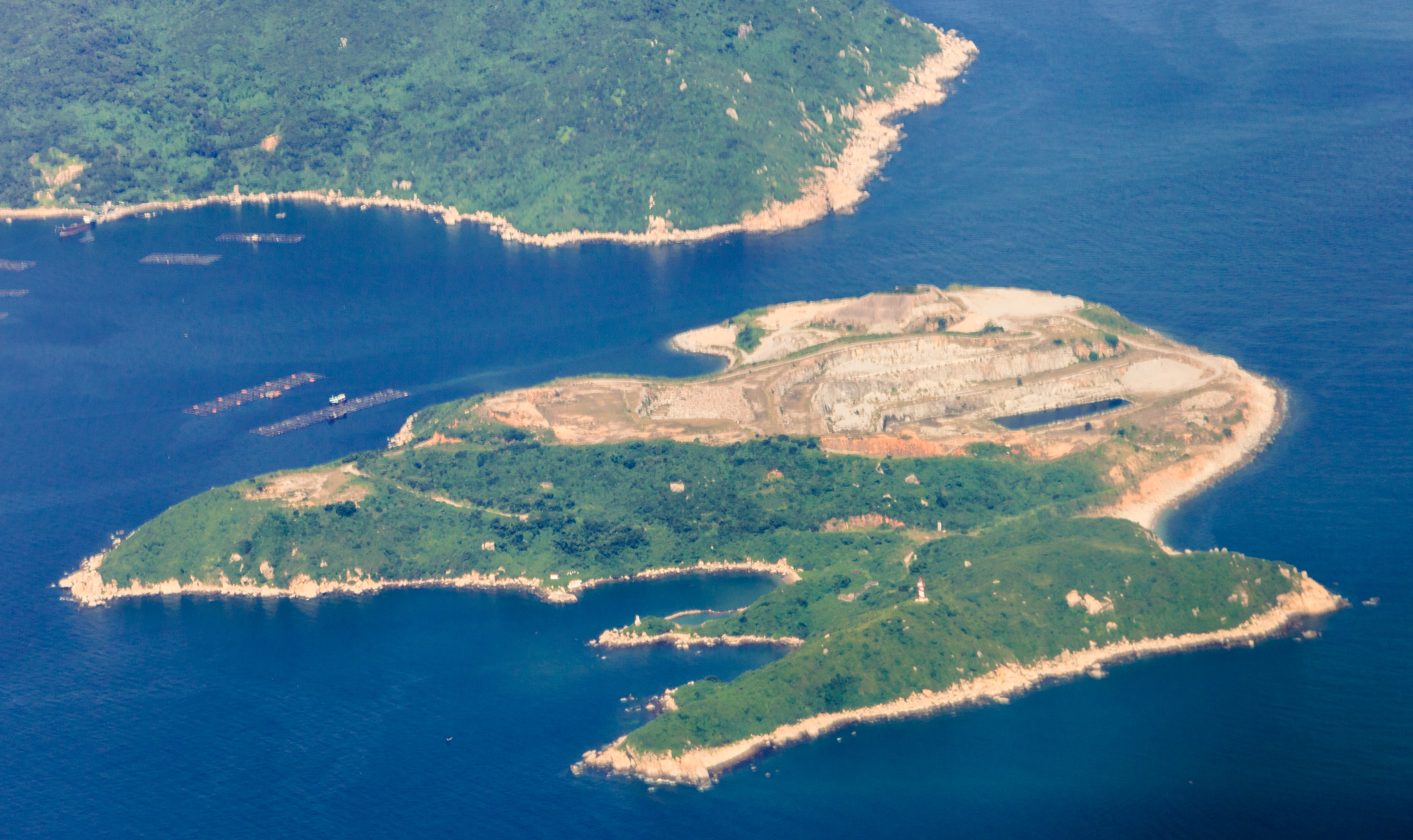
Dazhi Zhou (upper) and Xiaozhi Zhou (centre).

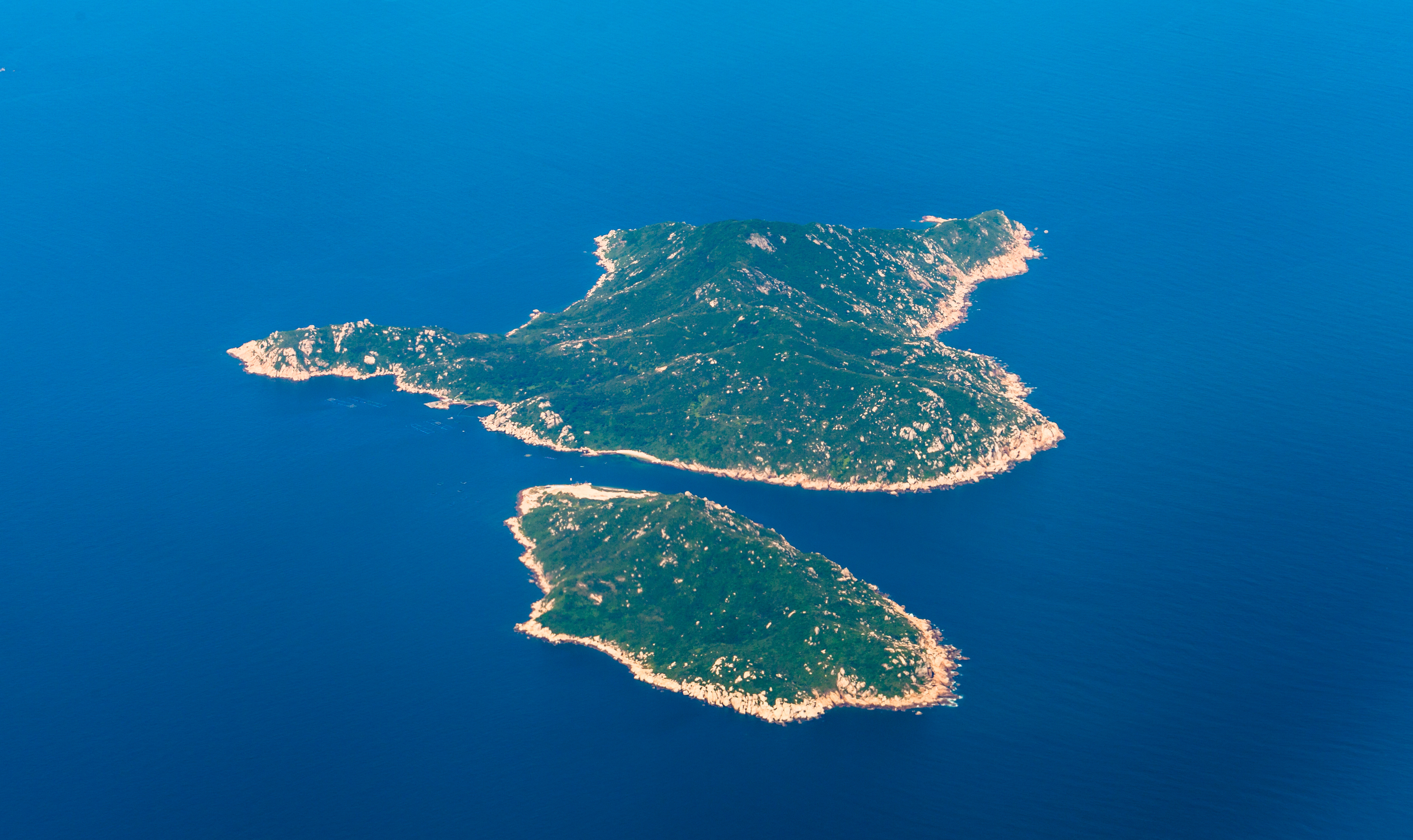
Ai Zhou Zi (bottom) and Ai Zhou (top).

Northwestern group, located between Lantau and Macau:

- Zhizhou Liedao (蜘洲列岛)
  - Dazhi Zhou (大蜘洲), 1.67 square kilometres (0.64 sq mi)
  - Xiaozhi Zhou (小蜘洲), 1.2 square kilometres (0.46 sq mi)
- Guishan Dao (桂山岛) – formerly PLA base from the 1950s. The seat of Guishan Town (桂山镇) of Zhuhai is located on the island
- Niutou Dao (牛头岛), 1.1 square kilometres (0.42 sq mi). Connected by a road to Guishan Dao
- Zhongxin Zhou (中心洲), 0.6 square kilometres (0.23 sq mi)
- Chitou Dao (赤滩岛), 0.17 kilometres (0.11 mi)
- Sanjiaoshan Dao (三角山岛), 0.82 square kilometres (0.32 sq mi)
- Qing Zhou (青洲)
- Sanjiao Zhou
- Jishiling Pai (鸡士令排)
- Dalu Dao (大碌岛)
- Datou Zhou (大头洲)

=== Other geographical elements ===
Other geographically important points of interest:

- Lema Channel is a major waterway in the archipelago.
- Dahengqin Dao is an island off Macau and not part of this archipelago.
- Erzhou, rising to 437.7 metres (1,436 ft) above sea level, is the highest point in the archipelago

== Population ==
There is a small local population, mostly in small fishing villages:

- Dangan
- Danganwei
- Nacun

== Economy ==
The archipelago's economy is mainly fisheries (crystal prawn, peeler crab). There is a growing tourism industry with a focus on history, beaches, and the natural beauty of the islands. About 350,000 tourists visit the islands annually. Club Med opened a holiday resort on Dong'ao in 2014.

There is also potential for petroleum extraction in the waters off the islands.

== Tourist sites ==
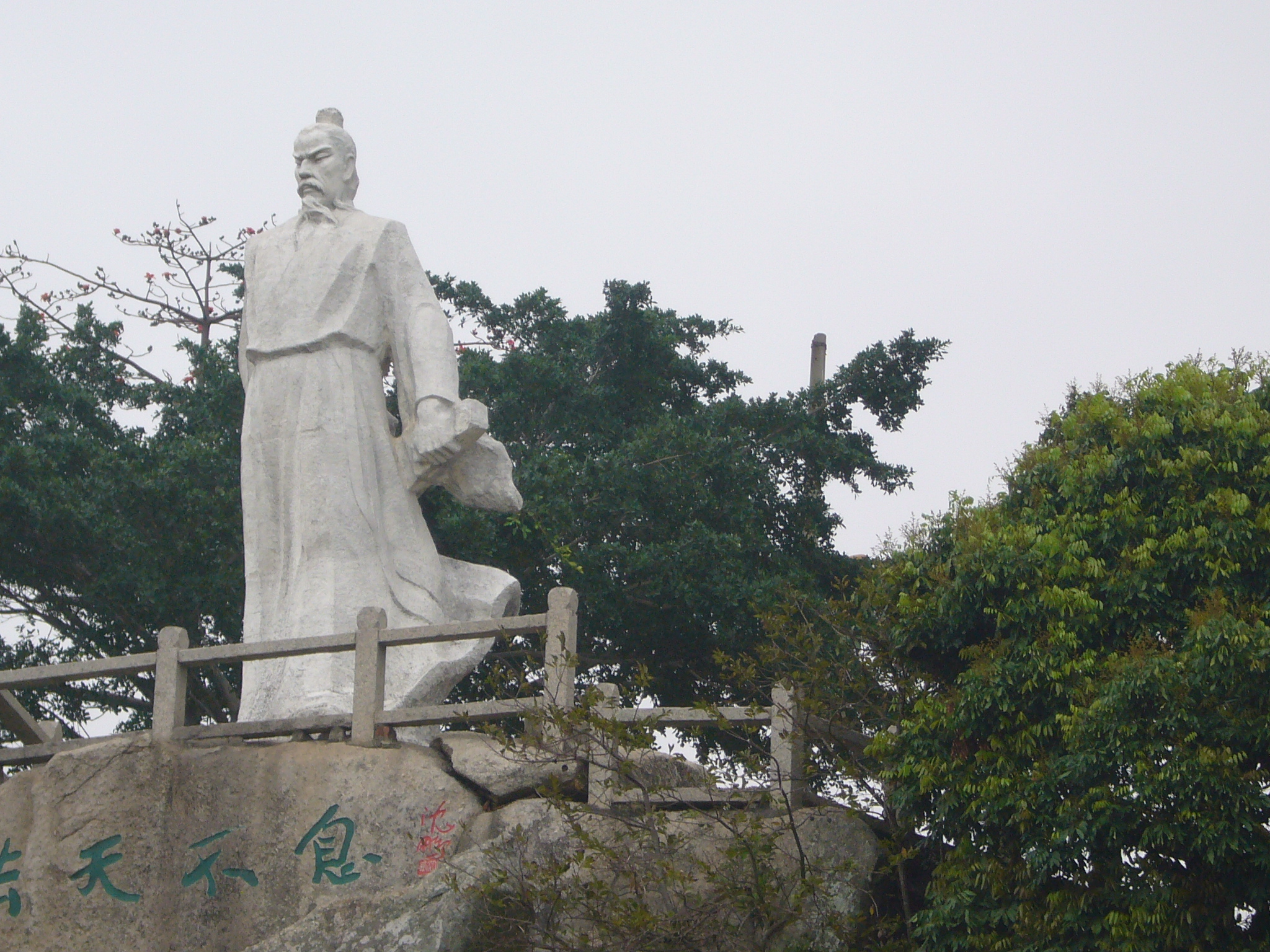
Wen Tianxiang statue on Guishan

Tourist sites of Wanshan Archipelago include:

- Dong'ao: Blundbuss Tower; Son-Soliciting Springs
- Dangan: Dangan Village
- Guishan: Monument to the Martyrs of Guishan Warship; Wen Tianxiang Park
- Miaowan: Xiafeng Bay, a coral beach adjacent to the fishing village.
- Wanshan: A-Ma Temple; Floating Cobbles Bay

== Transport ==
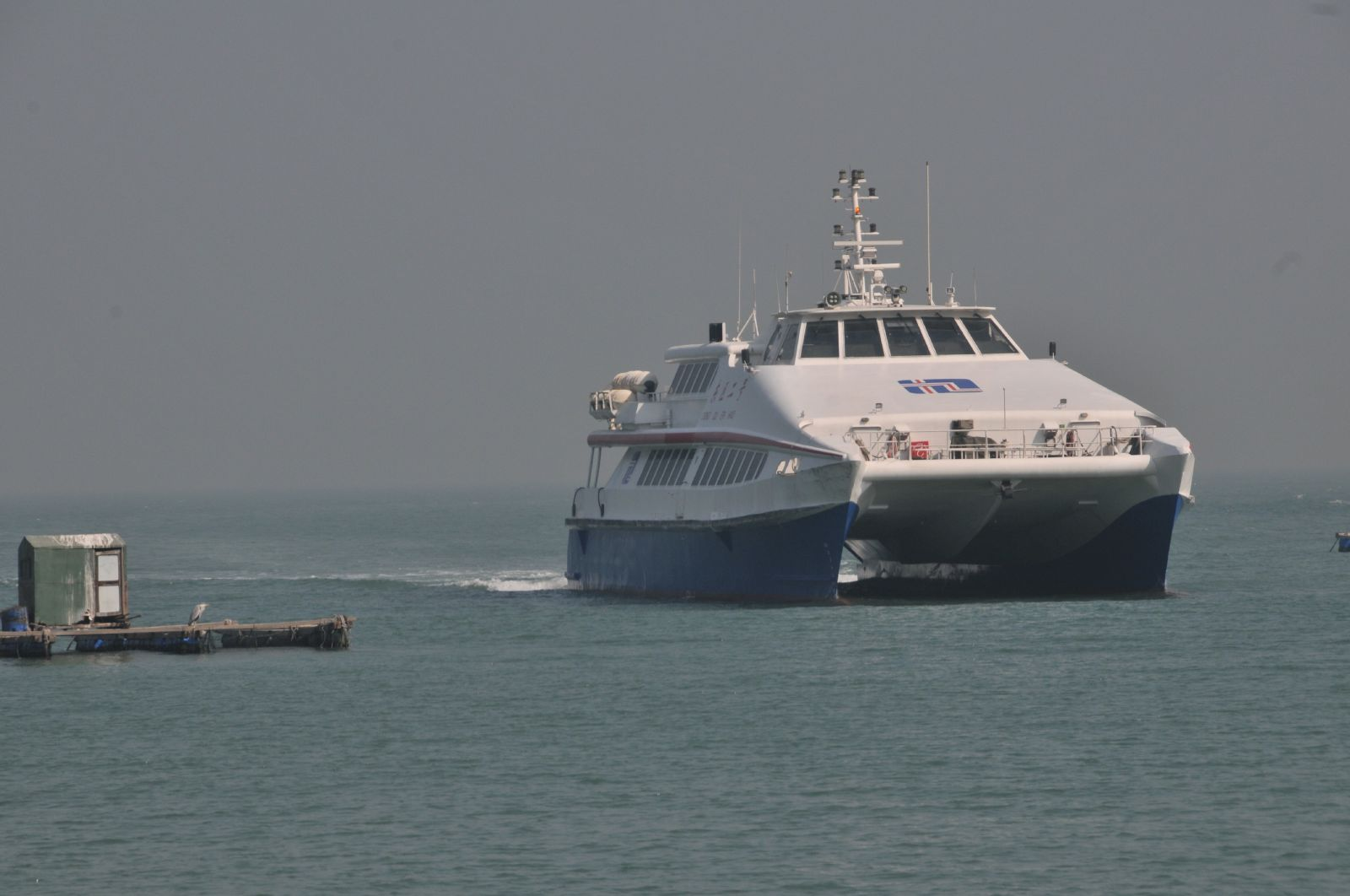
Ferry in Dong'ao Dao

- Ferry service from Zhuhai to Guishan, Wai Lingding, Dan'gan, Dong'ao and Wanshan
- Fast/slow ferry service to Guishan, Wai Lingding, Xiangzhou
- Sightseeing ferryboats from Zhuhai

== See also ==
- Wanshan Archipelago Campaign
- Guishan Offshore Windfarm
- Pirates of the South China Coast (18th–19th century)
