= Chinese Riviera =

Several tourist destinations in China

The term Chinese Riviera is used for several premier tourist destinations in China (including Hong Kong and Macau) near the Canton River in South China:

- Coastal areas in the city of Zhuhai, Guangdong Province.
- The south-eastern coast of Hainan, from Haitang Bay in Sanya to Xiangshuiwan (香水湾, Perfume Bay) in Lingshui Li.
