= Jiapeng Liedao =

Coordinates: 21°52′N 114°00′E

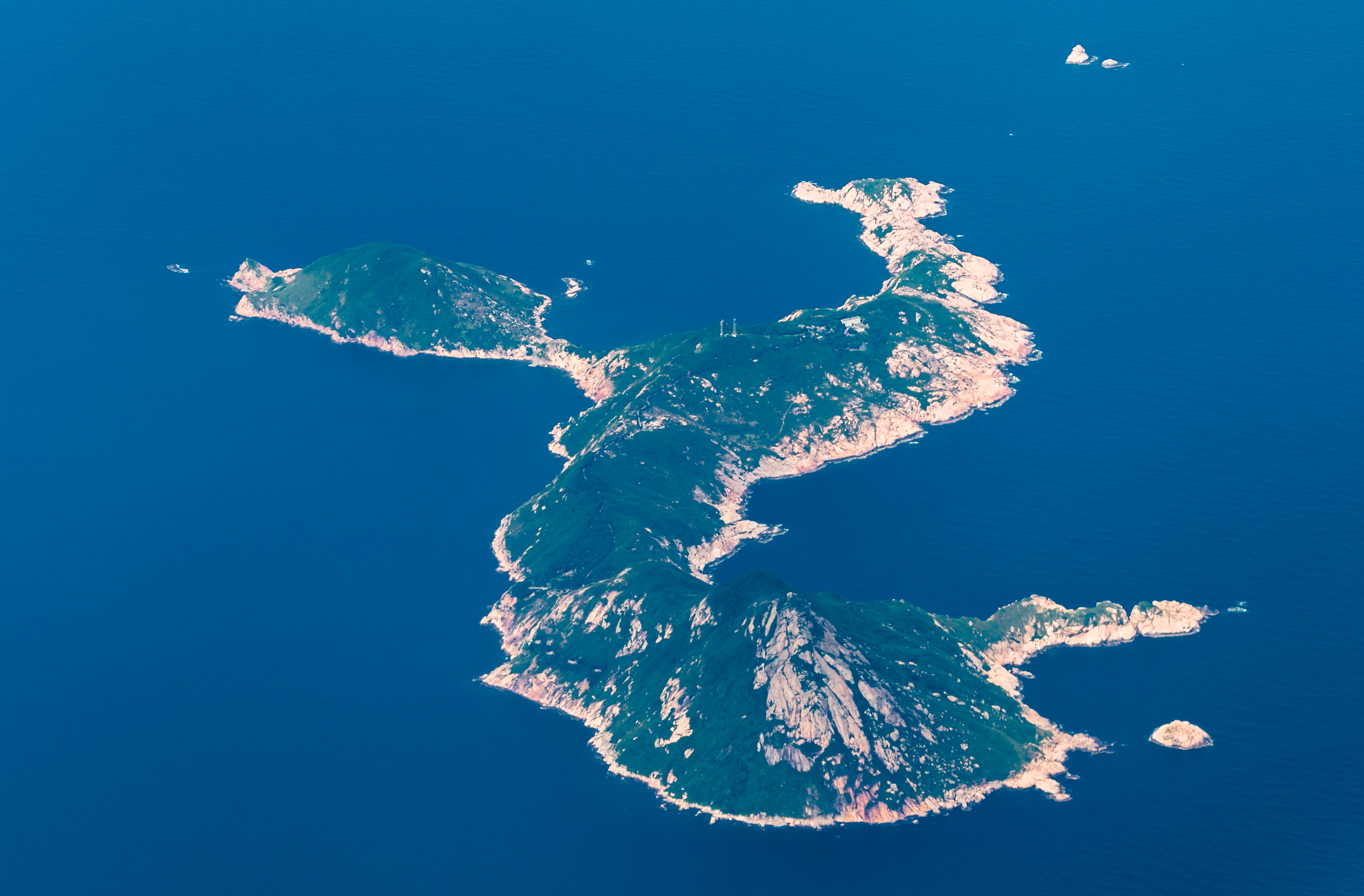
Beijian Dao

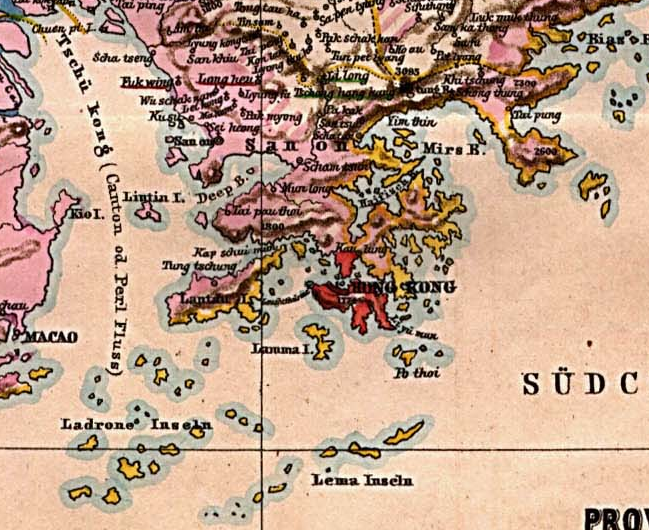
1878 German map of San On County

Jiapeng Liedao (佳蓬列岛; 佳蓬列島; Jiāpéng Lièdǎo; 'Jiapeng Islands' or 鸡澎群岛; 雞澎羣島; Jiāpéng Qúndǎo; 'Jipeng Islands'), also known as Asses' Ears, the Kaipong Islands (derived from the Cantonese pronunciation of the Chinese name) or Ky-poong, is a group of islands off the coast of Guangdong in China. They form a chain of rocks and islands extending 10 miles (16 km) SE from Eyanshi Dao (枙咽石岛; Èyānshí Dǎo; 'Eyanshi Island', O-yen-shih) to Wenwei Zhou (蚊尾洲). The islands are part of the Wanshan Archipelago.

== Name ==
Beijian Dao (北尖岛), also called Kaipong, gave its name to the island group. Also, two peaks rising almost perpendicularly to a height of 300 metres (980 ft) on the southwestern end of the island, are known as Asses' Ears. They also gave their name to the archipelago.

== Islands ==
There are two major islands in the northeast and a group of minor islands in the southwest. One major island is Beijian Dao (北尖岛). The other island is Yunghoy or Yung-gai.
