= Pan He =

Chinese sculptor (1925–2020)

- 潘鹤
- Born: 1925; Guangzhou, Guangdong, China
- Died: November 22, 2020 (aged 95); Guangzhou, Guangdong, China
- Education: South China People's Academy of Literature and Arts
- Notable work: Hard Times; Zhuhai Fisher Girl
- Style: Realism

Pan He
- Simplified Chinese: 潘鹤
- Traditional Chinese: 潘鶴
Transcriptions
Standard Mandarin
- Hanyu Pinyin: Pān Hè
- Wade–Giles: P'an1 Ho4
Yue: Cantonese
- Jyutping: pun1 hok6

Pan He (Chinese: 潘鹤; pinyin: Pān Hè; Jyutping: pun1 hok6, 1925 – November 22, 2020) was a Chinese sculptor and educator. Born in Guangzhou, Guangdong, he took up sculpture in his youth as the Japanese occupation kept him indoors. Despite a lack of support from his parents, in 1950 he enrolled at the Fine Arts department of the South China People's Academy of Literature and Arts. He gained national recognition in 1957 for his sculpture Hard Times and had begun teaching at the academy by 1960. Over his seventy-year career, Pan – an advocate for urban sculpture – produced hundreds of works including his Zhuhai Fisher Girl and Pioneering Ox, which became icons of Zhuhai and Shenzhen. Pan worked with a range of materials, producing realist works that reflect the history of modern China. He gained several national accolades, including lifetime achievement awards in 2009 and 2010.

== Early life ==
Pan He was born in Guangzhou, Guangdong, Republic of China, in 1925. In his youth, during the Japanese occupation, Pan spent much of his time indoors, extensively reading newspapers and literature. Drawing from the illustrations in these works, he took up sculpture and calligraphy, producing images of Beethoven, Turgenev, Dostoyevsky, and Byron. For three weeks in 1942, he studied under Huang Shaoqiang of the Lingnan School; he later identified Huang as his greatest artistic influence. In a 2010 interview, he recalled that his parents had not been supportive of his desire to become a sculptor.

As a youth, Pan developed romantic feelings for his cousin, A-Mei, who lived with her family in Hong Kong. During World War II, Pan travelled to Macau, then occupied by the Empire of Japan, in 1944 to visit her; she and her family had relocated during the occupation. Her parents disapproved of their relationship, and after Pan returned to Foshan to visit his parents he lost contact with them. He reunited with A-Mei in 1993 during a visit to Canada.

In 1950, after the end of World War II, Pan enrolled at the Fine Arts department of the South China People's Academy of Literature and Arts (now the Guangzhou Academy of Fine Arts). In his early years, he worked under the art name Yunhelou (云鹤楼), which he received from the artist Guan Shanyue. Pan gained national attention in the 1950s with his Hard Times (艰苦岁月, 1957), which was soon featured in textbooks for primary school students. Drawing from the experiences of the Red Army on Hainan Island, it depicts two soldiers during a time of rest, the younger listening intently as the weathered old soldier plays the flute. Other works that date from the 1950s and 1960s include When I Grow Up (当我长大的时候), After School (课余), and The Guangdong–Hong Kong Strike (省港大罢工).

By 1960, Pan had begun teaching at the Department of Sculpture, Guangzhou Academy of Fine Arts; he later became a tenured professor. Pan was one of the sculptors approached by Henry Fok in 1978 when the latter was developing a hot spring hotel in Zhongshan. Later that year, Pan and other faculty members of the Guangzhou Academy of Fine Arts used lime water to etch animal shapes from stones in Xianglu Bay near what is now Zhuhai.

== Zhuhai Fisher Girl and later career ==
In 1979, the Government of China was preparing to establish the Zhuhai Special Economic Zone. Wu Jianmin, who would become the secretary of the municipal Chinese Communist Party committee, put out calls for a monumental statue that would serve as an icon of the new city. Pan was among the sculptors brought to the area to inspect its possibilities. Ultimately, Pan developed a design – based on a local legend – of a fisherwoman holding a pearl aloft. Installation of this statue, Zhuhai Fisher Girl, was completed in 1982. The 8.7-metre (29 ft) work in granite has since become an icon of the city. The previous year, he had installed Pioneering Ox (开荒牛) in Shenzhen. Though controversial at the time, the work won Pan a gold medal at the Sixth National Art Exhibition. It has since become an icon of the city.

Over subsequent years, Pan installed several further works around Zhuhai. In 1984, he completed a monument to Yang Pao'an, an early leader with the Communist Party. This was followed in the 1990s by Wild Geese Landing on Pingsha (雁落平沙), a monument to farmers who had arrived in Pingtang Village beginning in 1955. Following the handover of Macau in 1999, Pan installed the 9.9-metre (32 ft) Reunion (重逢) on Qi'ao Island. This work not only symbolized the return of Macau to China but also Pan's reunion with A-Mei.

During the 2000s, Pan received several national and provincial accolades. In 2005, his Zhuhai Fisher Girl was featured on a stamp issued by China Post to commemorate the 25th anniversary of Zhuhai's founding. He received the China Art Award – Lifetime Achievement in 2009 and the first Lifetime Achievement Award in Literature and Art from Guangdong Province in 2010. After receiving the latter, Pan joked that it should be a half-life award, indicating that he would continue working. In 2011, Pan was among the first academics appointed to the China National Academy of Painting.

Pan completed a sculpture of Huang Shaoqiang in 2013 and inscribed it with the teachings of his mentor. In 2015, Pan installed Mother River (母亲河) in the Doumen District of Zhuhai. Intended as a companion piece to his earlier Zhuhai Fisher Girl, the sculpture depicts the fisherwoman after settling in the region. Still adorned with a fishing net, she watches over her son as he learns to swim. This work was completed with his son Pan Fen, with whom the elder Pan frequently collaborated.

By 2020, Pan was suffering from cerebral atrophy and restricted to a wheelchair. He died in Guangzhou on November 22, 2020, aged 95. During his lifetime he completed more than one hundred large sculptures, installed in sixty-eight cities in China and abroad. As of 2020, many of Pan's works are displayed at the Pan He Sculpture Art Park in Guangzhou's Haizhu District. An exhibition of more than one hundred of his works was held at the Guangdong Museum of Art in 2023.

== Style and assessment ==
Pan held that sculpture's place was outdoors and that "socialism is the best soil for urban sculpture". (Note: Original: 社会主义是城市雕塑的最佳土壤。) He worked with a range of materials, including bronze and granite, and strove to present a realist style. He was identified by Liang Jiang, the director of the Institute of Modern and Contemporary Chinese Art at the Guangzhou Academy of Fine Arts, as a mainstay of "Lingnan Sculpture". Pan described his works as united by the theme of truth, arguing:

Without truth, goodness and beauty are all false. Sculpture is a sentimental thing, just like falling in love. No matter how much money you have, if you don't have feelings, you lack it. Don't follow money. Only what impresses yourself can impress others. Only by thinking independently can you exert your ability to the limit. (Note: Original:没有真，善和美都是假的。雕塑是感性的东西，就像谈恋爱一样，不管你有多少钱，没有感觉就是没有感觉。不跟钱走，打动自己的才能感动他人。只有独立思考，才能将自己的能力发挥到极限。)

In its obituary of Pan, the China Artists Association described his works as reflecting a wealth of artistic, historical, social, and humanistic values. It highlighted Hard Times, which was deemed to have "the perfect combination of revolutionary realism and romanticism". (Note: Original: 革命现实主义与浪漫主义的完美结合。) Pan was included in the Soviet Academy of Sciences' History of World Art, as well as several histories of Chinese art. The sculptor Liang Mingchen argued that no other sculptor "has made such a sincere, strong, comprehensive and profound expression of Chinese history in the 20th century." (Note: Original: 那样对20世纪的中国历史做了如此真诚而强烈、全面而深刻的表现。)

== Gallery ==
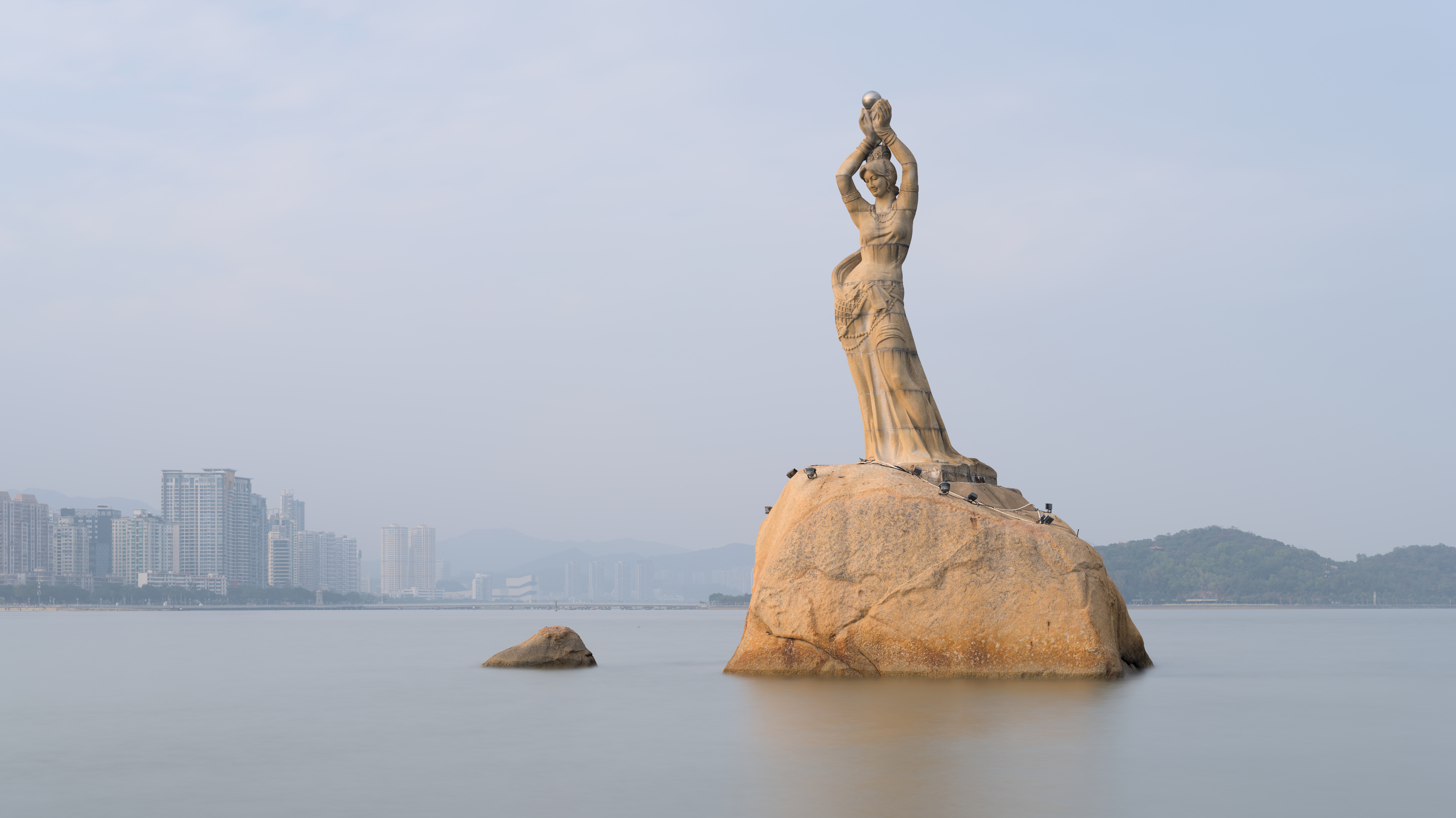
Zhuhai Fisher Girl (珠海渔女, Zhuhai, 1982)

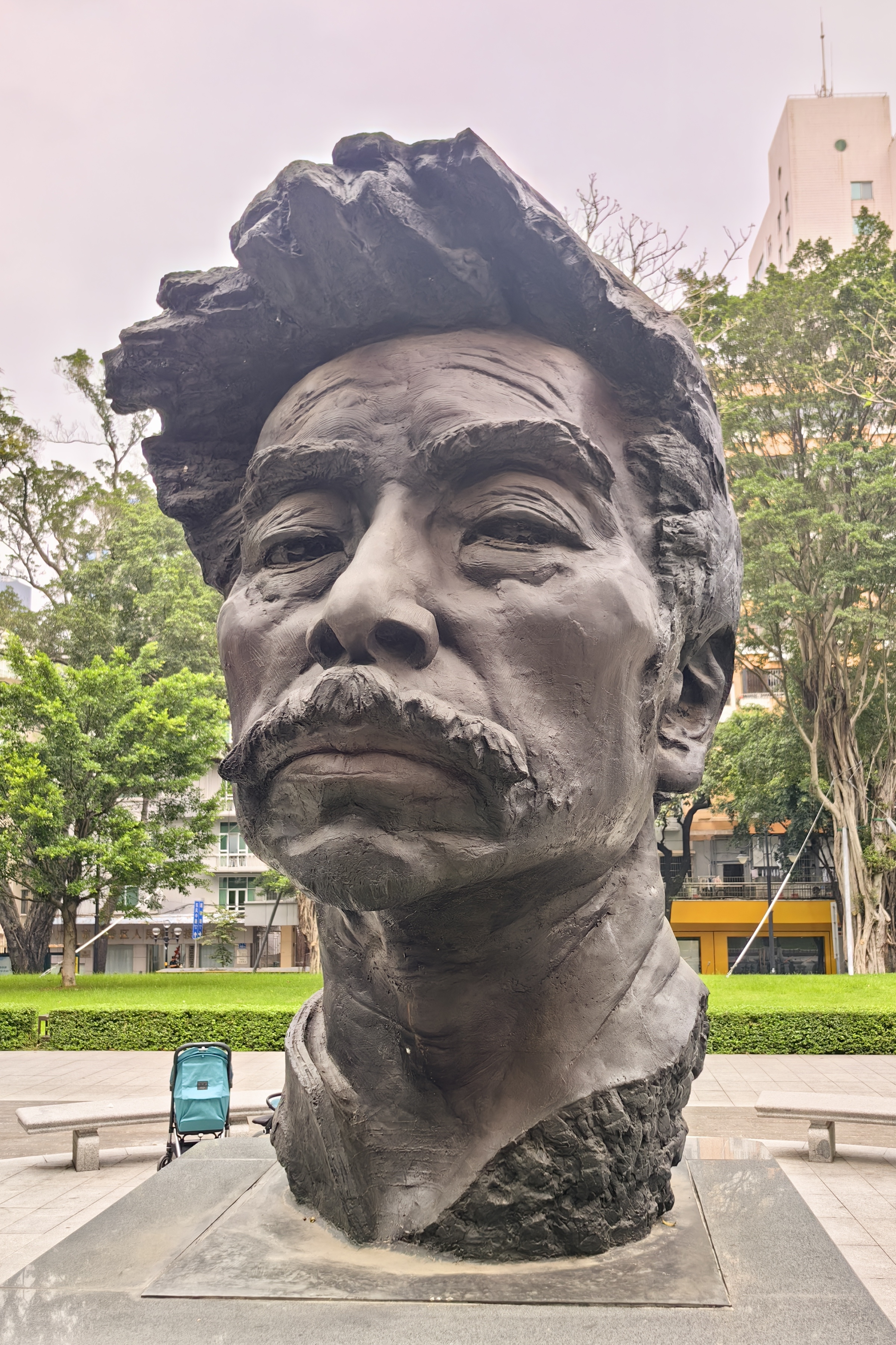
Portrait of Lu Xun (鲁迅像, Foshan, 1987)

== Works cited ==
- 著名雕塑家、教育家潘鹤逝世 [Famous Sculptor and Educator Pan He has Passed Away] (in Chinese). China Artists Association. 2020. Archived from the original on September 2, 2024.
- 著名雕塑家潘鹤去世：作品走进小学课本 5件杰作概括一生 [Famous Sculptor Pan He Passed Away: His Works Were Included in Primary School Textbooks, and 5 Masterpieces Summarized His Life]. cctv.com (in Chinese). China Central Television. November 22, 2020. Archived from the original on January 21, 2021.
- Jiang, Xinchen (November 26, 2020). "潘鹤：渔女之父的珠海情缘" [Pan He: The Father of the Fisherwoman and His Love for Zhuhai]. Southcn.com (in Chinese). China South Publishing & MediaGroup. Archived from the original on September 1, 2024.
- 他的雕塑记录时代！潘鹤与新中国雕塑研究展开幕 [His Sculptures Record the Times! Pan He and the New China Sculpture Research Exhibition opens] (in Chinese). Government of Guangzhou. September 23, 2023. Archived from the original on September 2, 2024.
- 珠海渔女是这样来的！她的"生父"原来是... [This is How the Zhuhai Fisher Girl Came to Be! Her "Biological Father" Turned Out to Be...]. The Paper. July 30, 2020. Archived from the original on September 1, 2024.
- 画中有话——《珠海渔女》 [Words in Art: Zuhai Fisher Girl]. 21st Century Business Herald (in Chinese). Southern Finance Media Group. April 11, 2021. Archived from the original on September 1, 2024.
