= Zhuhai Fisher Girl =

Statue in Zhuhai, China

Coordinates: 22°15′55.4″N 113°34′59.6″E

- 珠海渔女 (Chinese)
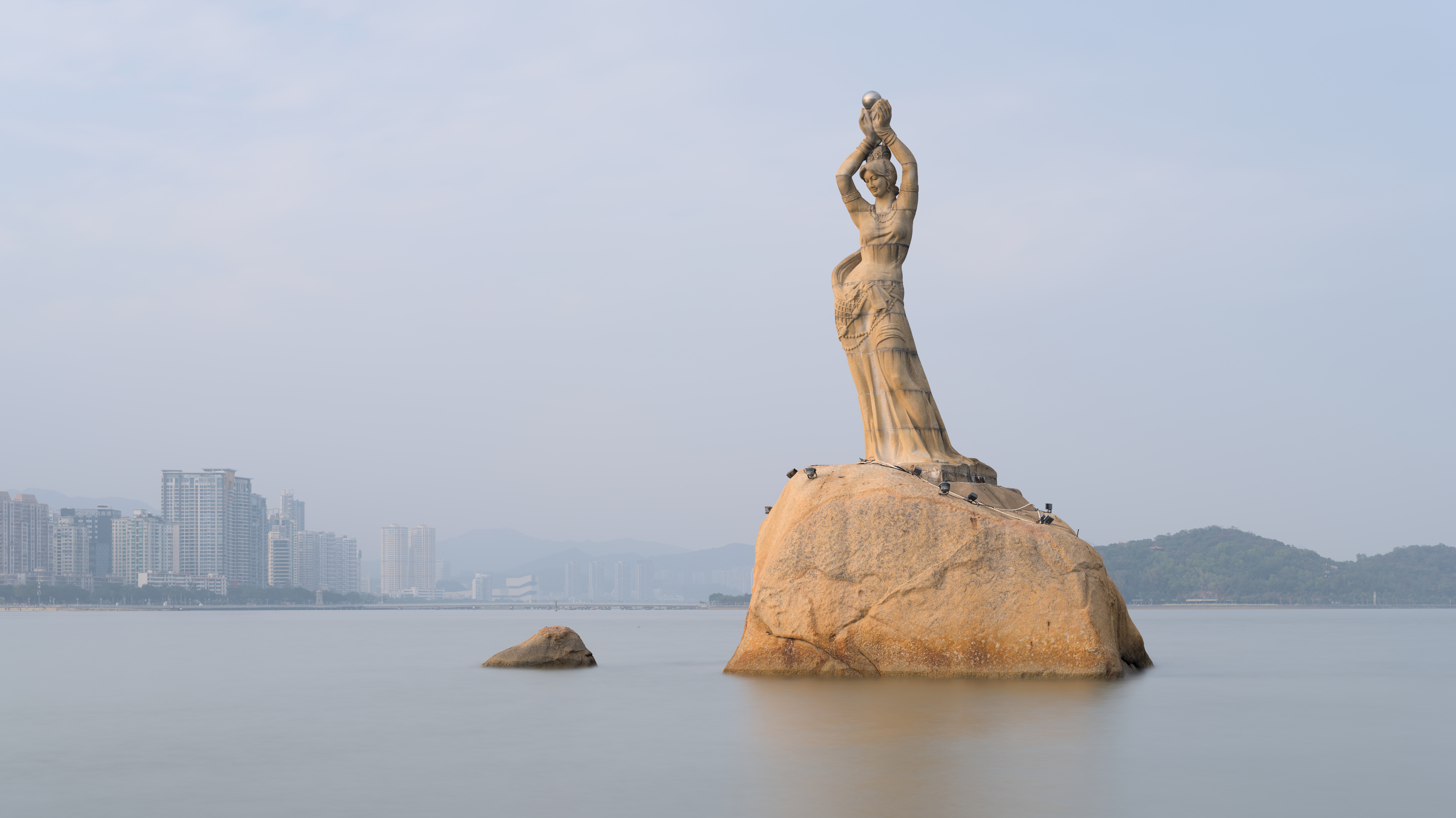
- Artist: Pan He
- Completion date: 1979–1982
- Medium: Granite
- Dimensions: 8.7 m (29 ft)
- Weight: 10 tonnes (9.8 long tons; 11 short tons)
- Location: Zhuhai, China

Chinese name
- Simplified Chinese: 珠海渔女
- Traditional Chinese: 珠海漁女
Transcriptions
Standard Mandarin
- Hanyu Pinyin: Zhūhǎi Yú Nǚ
Yue: Cantonese
- Jyutping: zyu1 hoi2 jyu4 neoi5

Zhuhai Fisher Girl (Chinese: 珠海渔女; pinyin: Zhūhǎi Yú Nǚ) is a statue and landmark in the Xianglu Bay area of Zhuhai in Guangdong, China. Commissioned ahead of the establishment of the Zhuhai Special Economic Zone, the statue was designed by Pan He based on a local legend about a heavenly celestial being who descended to the region to live as a simple fisherwoman. Though its monetary cost was controversial, the statue was completed in 1982 and became part of the region's growing tourism industry. The statue was designated a cultural relic in 2014, and the following year the sculptor completed a companion piece with his son that depicts the fisher girl as a mother. A proposal has been made to expand the area around the statue into a mixed-purpose recreational area.

== Location and description ==
The statue stands on a boulder in Xianglu Bay. It is located southeast of Zhuhai, and accessible via Qinglu Middle Road. A boardwalk on the shore allows for close views, and the nearby park, known as Lover's Road, contains ginkgo, white pine, elm, and locust trees. Admission is free of charge.

The statue depicts a young woman, trouser leg rolled high, who is draped by a fishnet and holds a pearl high in the air with both hands up to the sky. The figure is adorned with jade bracelets and a pearl necklace. She is described by the 21st Century Business Herald as "endowed with the image of classical beauty", (Note: Original: 赋予了古典美的意象.) her strong and plump body combining the beauty of Ancient Greek sculpture with the "Oriental charm" (Note: Original: 东方神韵) of depictions of the Buddha. The statue, which symbolizes a vigorous and lively Zhuhai welcoming visitors from all over the world, stands 8.7 metres (29 ft) tall and is composed of seventy pieces of granite. It weighs 10 tonnes (9.8 long tons; 11 short tons).

== History ==
In 1979, as the Government of China prepared to create the Zhuhai Special Economic Zone, Wu Jianmin – later the first secretary of the municipal Chinese Communist Party committee – proposed the creation of a new statue that would become iconic of the nascent city. The committee reached out to the Department of Sculpture at the Guangzhou Academy of Fine Arts, seeking designs. Initial drafts suggested erecting the sculpture at the Gongbei Port of Entry and many of the early designs drew on imagery of male creators. However, Pan He, an established sculptor and professor from the academy, proposed instead a design that reflected the historical importance of fishing in the region: a fisherwoman.

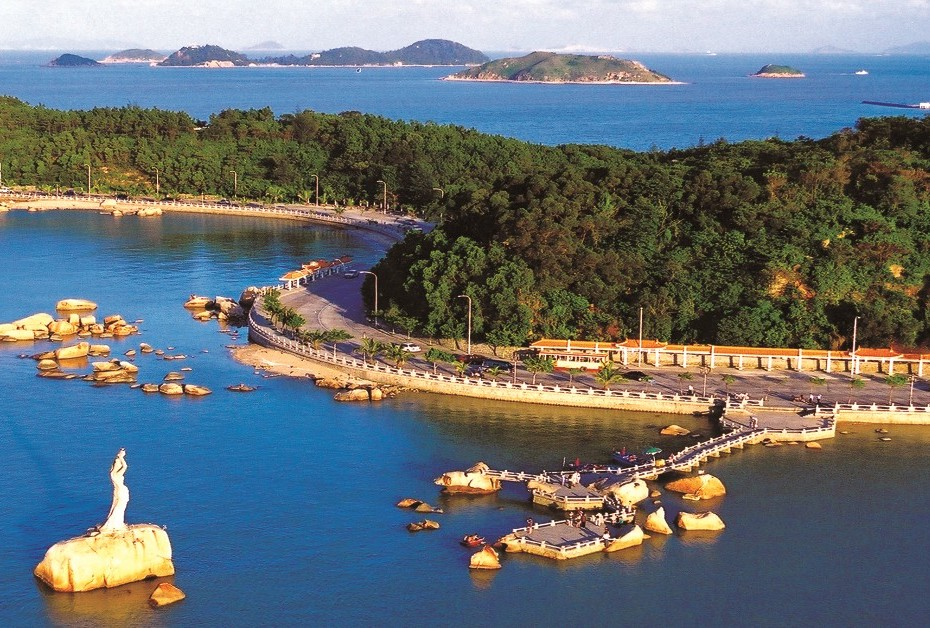
Zhuhai Fisher Girl (bottom left) along the coast of Zhuhai

This idea drew on a local legend, which is recorded in several versions. According to one version, the daughter of the celestial Dragon King visited the Pearl River delta. Enamored by the beauty of the Zhuhai region, she disguised herself as a fisher girl and lived among the people there, weaving baskets and healing locals with her powers until she fell in love with a fellow fisherman named Haipeng. Their romance was interrupted by vicious rumors about the fisherwoman's true origins. Haipeng eventually confronted her about this and demanded that she give her magical pearl bracelets to him as proof of her love. She confirmed the rumors and explained that, if she removed even one of the pearls, she would die. As Haipeng turned to leave, the girl took off her bracelets, dying in his arms. Heartbroken and guilt-ridden, Haipeng set out to find a cure, eventually discovering from an elder that he would need to cultivate a special grass with his own blood. After years of toiling, Haipeng finally harvested enough to revive his beloved, turning her into a mortal. The two married and the fisher girl found a large pearl, which she gifted to the elder in gratitude. (Note: Another story tells of two lovers using a pearl to banish a fox spirit, the woman frozen in stone as her pearl acts as a beacon of protective light. A third folk tale relates the protective pearl to a young girl who vanquished a clam spirit (NetEase 2021).)

This design was ultimately selected, to be erected in Xianglu Bay – then replete with wormwood and undergrowth. The initial design depicted the woman holding a pearl before her, standing atop a fish. In the final design, she holds the pearl aloft, which the news website 163.com describes as giving a more pure and generous presentation. The fish, meanwhile, was removed from the design when its execution proved too difficult.

During the construction process, the sculpture became the subject of public discourse. Opponents argued against the depiction of a fisherwoman, which was deemed immoral, as well as the cost of erecting a large sculpture – estimated at 200,000 yuan (equivalent to ¥1,240,000 in 2024) – when the new city lacked adequate housing. Supporters, meanwhile, argued that the statue was necessary for Zhuhai to establish its own cultural identity, rather than be perceived as feeding off nearby Hong Kong and Macau. Over time, as housing projects were completed and the special economic zone began to be realized, this controversy dwindled. Installation of the statue was completed in 1982, following which it was used as part of the zone's growing tourism industry.

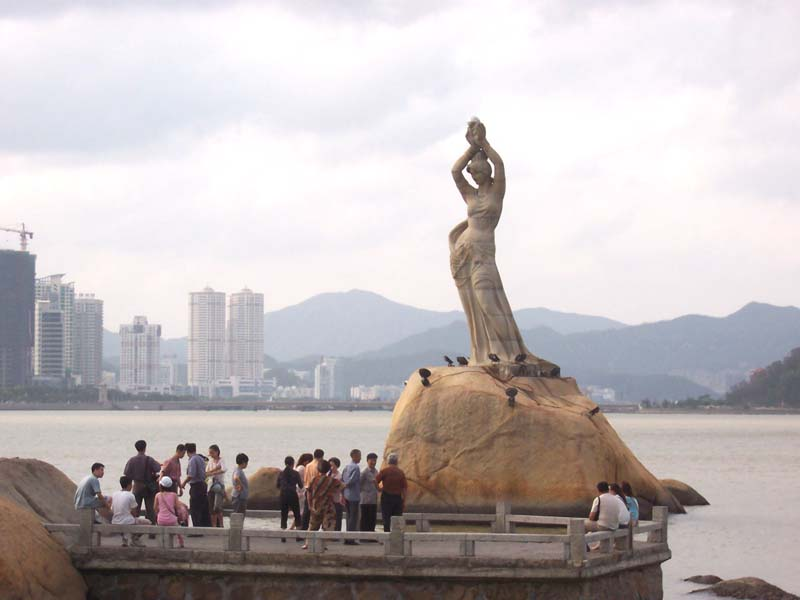
Tourists at the statue

Zhuhai Fisher Girl was recognized by the Ministry of Culture and Tourism as a cultural relic in 2014 after the definition of "relic" was expanded to include works created after the founding of the People's Republic of China. With this designation, no further changes could be made to the statue; however, plans were made in preparation to expand the surrounding area to create a 15,000-to-20,000-square-metre (160,000 to 220,000 sq ft) mixed-purpose recreational area. Drawing on the examples of the Macau Tower in Macau and the Oriental Pearl Tower in Shanghai, this proposal would see the bay around the statue reclaimed to create a modern tourist destination.

In 2005, to commemorate the 25th anniversary of Zhuhai's designation as a special economic zone, China Post issued a commemorative stamp titled "Beautiful Zhuhai" that depicts Zhuhai Fisher Girl. Pan He completed a companion piece, Mother River (母亲河), in 2015 together with his son Pan Fen. Located along the Huangyuang River in Zhuhai's Doumen District, the statue depicts the young fisherwoman with her son. She has settled the land and is teaching her child to swim, even as she carries a fishing net and a pearl oyster.
