= Yang Pao'an =

Chinese Marxist revolutionary (1896–1931)

- 楊匏安
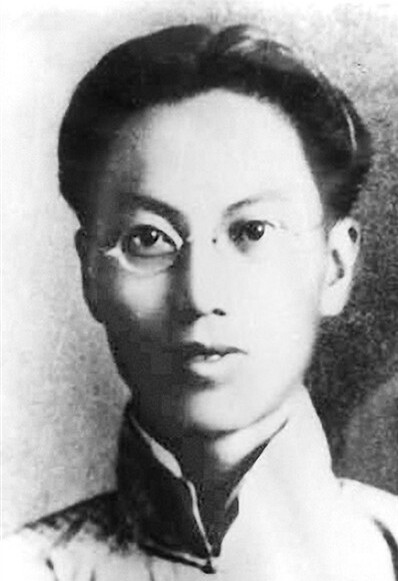

Personal details
- Born: 1896; Beishan, Xiangshan County, Guangdong, Qing dynasty
- Died: August 1931 (aged 34–35); Shanghai, Republic of China
- Political party: Chinese Communist Party

Chinese name
- Traditional Chinese: 楊匏安
- Simplified Chinese: 杨匏安
Transcriptions
Standard Mandarin
- Hanyu Pinyin: Yáng Páo'ān
- Wade–Giles: Yang2 P'ao2-an1
Yue: Cantonese
- Jyutping: joeng4 paau4 on1

Yang Pao'an (traditional Chinese: 楊匏安; simplified Chinese: 杨匏安; pinyin: Yáng Páo'ān; Wade–Giles: Yang^{2} P'ao^{2}-an^{1}, 1896–1931) was a Chinese Marxist and early member of the Chinese Communist Party (CCP). Born in Xiangshan County, Guangdong, he promoted the spread of Marxism in southern China through newspaper publications and involvement with the May Fourth Movement and the Canton–Hong Kong strike. With his friend Tan Pingshan, he was one of the CCP's envoys to the Kuomintang (KMT) during the parties' First United Front and held several roles within that party. Elected to the CCP's Central Supervisory Committee in 1927, he was dismissed later that year due to his association with Tan. Yang remained active with the party, working on its newspaper publications through the end of his life. In August 1931, he was detained in Shanghai by the KMT and executed.

== Early life and activities ==
Yang was born in 1896 to a merchant family in Beishan Village, Xiangshan County, Guangdong (now part of Zhuhai). He was the only surviving child of nine born to the family. He showed an interest in writing and poetry from a young age, gaining recognition for his works by age ten. He also spent some time studying in Japan.

In 1919, Yang was an active member of the May Fourth Movement. He developed the belief that Marxism was the best means of securing China's future, the only "scientific socialism", and over the next decade he frequently hosted fellow communists at the family home. Yang also began writing extensively, penning a series of forty-one articles in Guangdong Zhonghua Xinbao under the collective title "World Doctrines". Subjects included philosophical idealism, materialism, and various approaches to socialism. Nineteen of these serialized articles dealt with Marxism.

Yang's writings were published near contemporaneously with those of Li Dazhao, who was active in northern China. They differed in their inspirations, however; Li drew from the works of the Japanese Marxist Kawakami Hajime, while Yang was influenced by the writings of Sakai Toshihiko – the founder and first general secretary of the Japanese Communist Party. Yang also spread Marxist teachings through his interactions with labour, including teachers and railway workers; he organized workers in labour actions, travelling to Hong Kong to help administer the Canton–Hong Kong strike of 1926. Through these activities, in 1920 Yang met and formed a friendship with Tan Pingshan, who had been writing on similar subjects in the Guangdong Qunbao.

== Party membership ==
In early 1921, Yang was brought into the as-yet-undeclared Chinese Communist Party (CCP) by Tan. Three years later, after the CCP established the First United Front with the Kuomintang (KMT), he was tasked by the CCP's 3rd Central Executive Committee to facilitate this alliance. He thus became one of the CCP's representatives in the KMT, serving as a Central Committee member and as secretary of the Central Organization Department (the latter on Tan's recommendation). Part of his duties was recruiting new cadres for the party, for which Yang focused primarily on peasants and labourers; consequently, KMT member Chiang Kai-shek, who later led the party in a civil war against the CCP, decried him as having been "purposely planted in [the Central Organization Department] to facilitate Communist infiltration".

Yang was dismissed from his position in the KMT central committee in 1926. In 1927, Yang attended the 5th National Congress of the Chinese Communist Party in Wuhan, where he was elected deputy chairman of the Central Supervisory Committee. Weeks before the congress, conservative members of the KMT under Chiang Kai-shek had massacred communists in Shanghai, and CCP's alliance with the party was collapsing. As the situation became more dangerous, Yang attended an emergency party meeting on 7 August 1927, after Tan led an armed conflict against the KMT in Nanchang.

Toward the end of 1927, Yang was dismissed from the Central Supervisory Committee of the CCP due to his association with Tan, who had broken from the KMT and CCP to help establish the Provisional Action Committee of the Chinese Nationalist Party or "Third Party". Around this time, Yang travelled to Southeast Asia, where he removed himself from the conflict while also spreading communist teachings.

== Later years and death ==
Cultural Relics Associated with Yang Pao'an

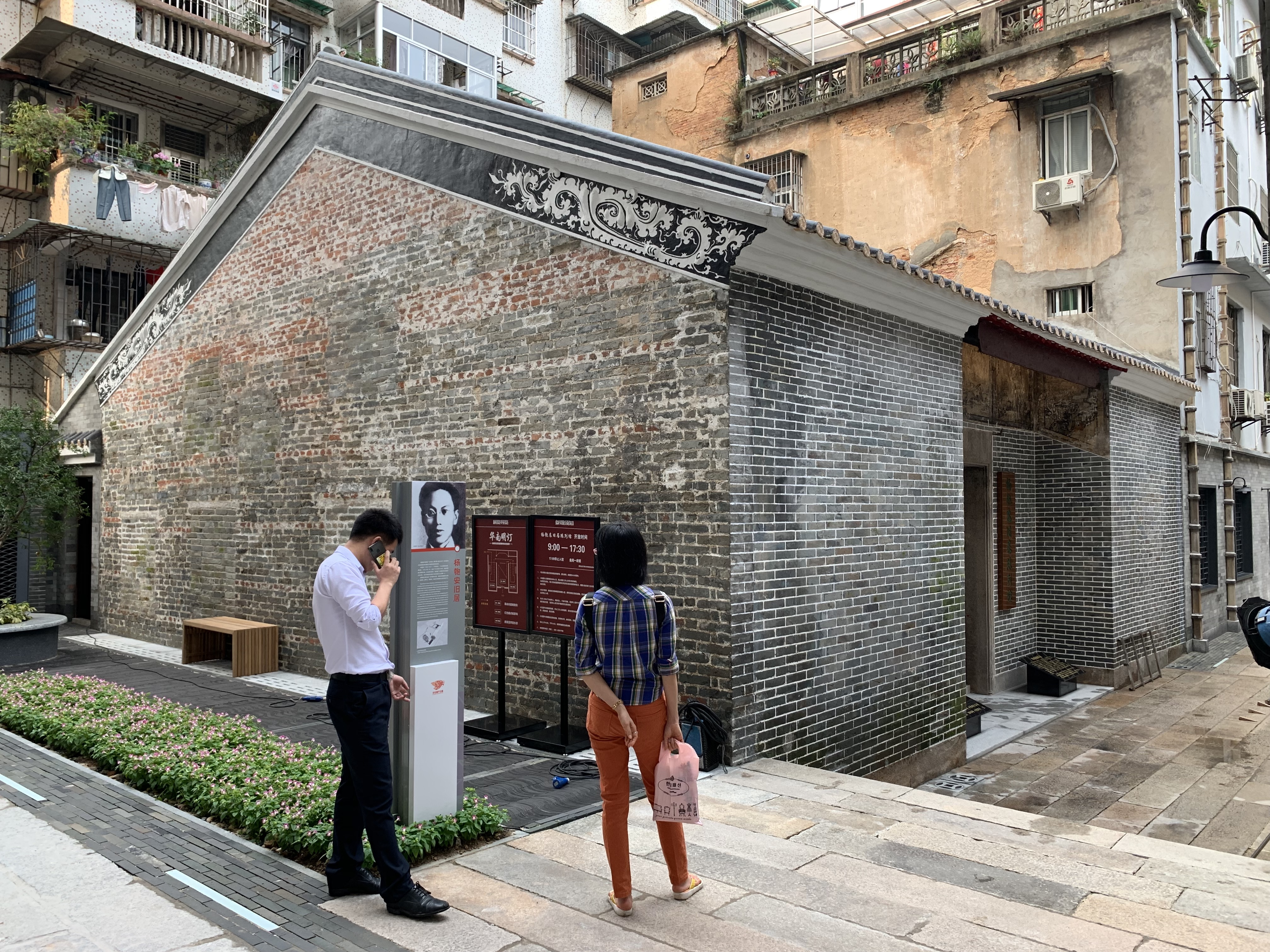
The Yang family home/ancestral hall

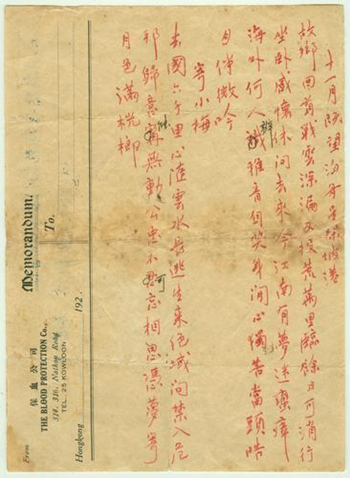
Poetry written by Yang, 1927

Yang returned to Shanghai in 1929, and his family, which had remained in Guangzhou, moved to join him. Yang continued to support the CCP, writing and translating materials on Marxism, while publishing periodicals and distributing them furtively. In the meanwhile, drawing on lectures from the Moscow Sun Yat-sen University, he worked on a history of the Western world using the perspective of historical materialism. It highlighted the revolutions and communist movements in Europe and North America.

For his activities, Yang was arrested by the KMT in 1930, after which he was released. The following year, Yang was one of sixteen CCP members detained by the KMT in Shanghai after the arrest of Luo Qiyuan, the former head of the CCP's publicity department. In a note smuggled to his family, he warned against corresponding with old acquaintances from Nanjing and selling the family's source of income: a sewing machine.

According to the People's Daily, during his internment Yang was personally called by Chiang Kai-shek and urged to surrender to the KMT. Despite threats, Yang refused to forsake the CCP, instead throwing the phone against a wall. An angered Chiang thus ordered Yang's execution, and he was killed at the Longhua Garrison Command in August 1931. The Paper has thus identified him as a martyr of the CCP.

== Legacy ==
Yang had seven children. Two died in their youth. Four sons – Yang Xuan, Yang Ming, Yang Zhi, and Yang Wenwei – worked with the CCP through the Chinese Civil War. The Yang family home and ancestral hall in Yuexiu, Guangzhou, was made a cultural relic and opened to the public. As of 2022, it holds a permanent exhibit: "The Beacon of South China – Revolutionary Historical Relics Exhibition at the Former Residence of Yang Pao'an".

A sculpture commemorating Yang was created by Pan He in 1984; it is installed in Zhuhai. In 2019, two poems written by Yang – the only known surviving examples of his handwriting – were granted Grade II cultural relic status. Sent in 1927 to a cousin's husband, these works are now held at the Zhuhai Museum.

== Works cited ==
- Chiang, Kai-shek (1965). Soviet Russia in China. Noonday Press. OCLC 421794.
- "永远的丰碑：我党早期优秀理论家杨匏安" [Eternal Monument: Yang Pao'an, an Outstanding Theorist in the Early Period of the CPC] (in Chinese). Ministry of Education of China. 7 July 2017. Archived from the original on 3 September 2024.
- Fenby, Jonathan (2003). Generalissimo: Chiang Kai-shek and the China He Lost. Simon and Schuster. ISBN 978-0-7432-3144-2.
- "杨匏安旧居" [Former Residence of Yang Pao'an] (in Chinese). Ministry of Education of China. 7 November 2022. Archived from the original on 3 September 2024.
- Groot, Gerry (2004). Managing Transitions: The Chinese Communist Party, United Front Work, Corporatism and Hegemony. Routledge. ISBN 978-1-135-95292-1.
- Jiang, Xinchen (26 November 2020). "潘鹤：渔女之父的珠海情缘" [Pan He: The Father of the Fisherwoman and His Love for Zhuhai]. Southcn.com (in Chinese). China South Publishing & MediaGroup. Archived from the original on 1 September 2024.
- Meng, Hong (24 May 2021). "杨匏安：对党"公忠不可忘"的先驱" [Yang Pao'an: A Pioneer Who Was "Unforgettable in His Loyalty to the Party"]. People's Daily (in Chinese). Central Committee of the Chinese Communist Party. Archived from the original on 3 September 2024.
- "杨匏安：华南传播马克思主义第一人" [Yang Pao'an: The First Person to Spread Marxism in South China]. The Paper (in Chinese). Shanghai United Media Group. 18 October 2021. Archived from the original on 3 September 2024.
- "杨匏安华南地区最早传播马列主义 牺牲后四个儿子都走上革命道路" [Yang Pao'an: The First to Spread Marxism-Leninism in South China; After his Death, All Four of His Sons Embarked on the Revolutionary Path] (in Chinese). Hubei Provincial Commission for Discipline, Inspection, and Supervision. 7 July 2017. Archived from the original on 21 September 2020.
- "Zhuhai Museum documents given national relic status". China Daily. Publicity Department of the Chinese Communist Party. 28 January 2019. Archived from the original on 3 September 2024.
