= Su Zhaozheng =

Chinese trade unionist and politician

- 苏兆征
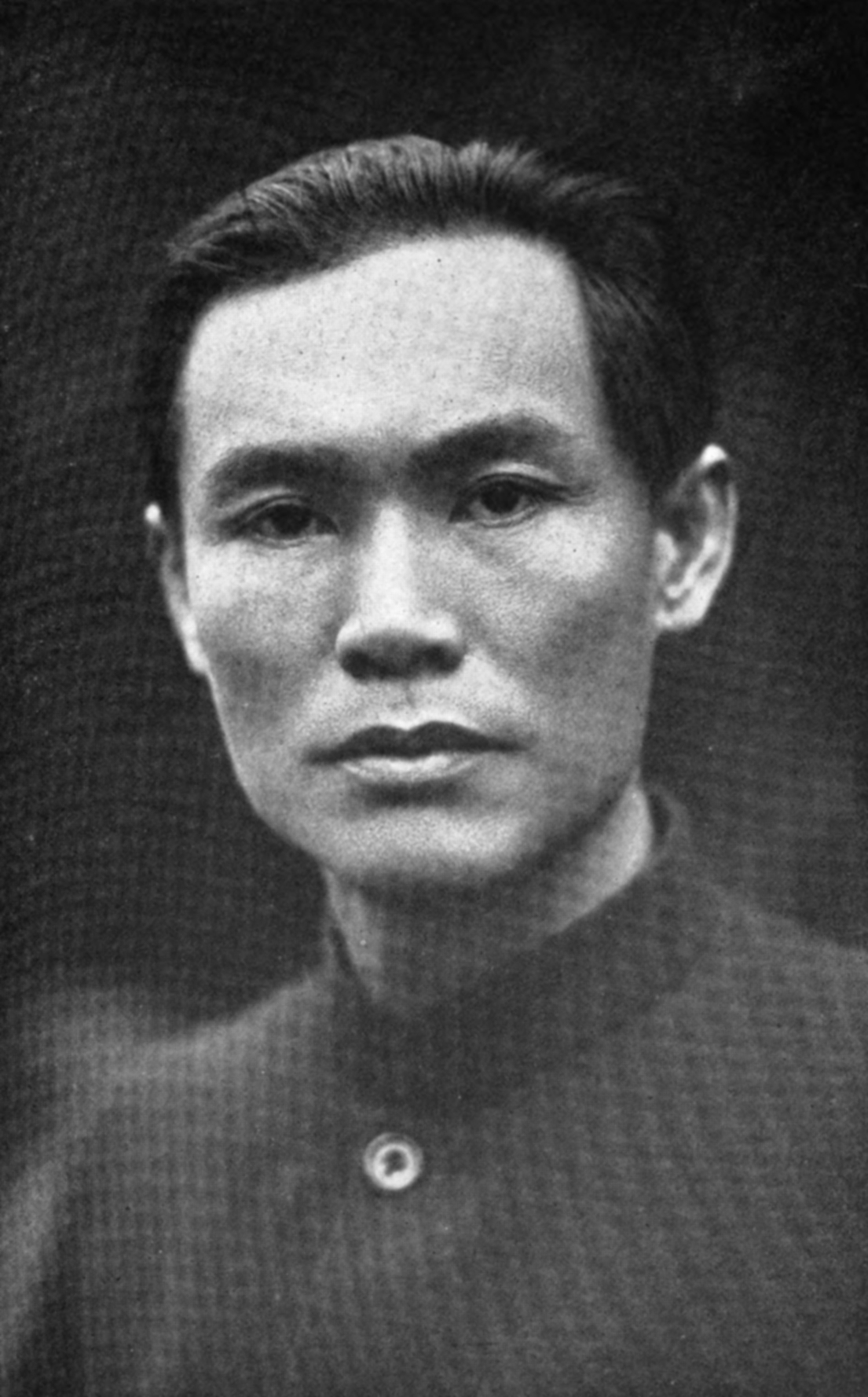
- Su Zhaozheng c. 1927

Personal details
- Born: 11 November 1885 Qi'ao, Guangdong, Qing Dynasty
- Died: 25 February 1929 (aged 43) Shanghai, Republic of China
Su Zhaozheng
- Traditional Chinese: 蘇兆徵
- Simplified Chinese: 苏兆征
Transcriptions
Standard Mandarin
- Hanyu Pinyin: Sū Zhàozhēng
- Wade–Giles: Su^{1} Chao^{4}-chêng^{1}
Yue: Cantonese
- Jyutping: Sou^{1} Siu^{6}-zing^{1}
other Yue
- Taishanese: Lhu^{1} Siau^{4}-zen^{1}

Su Zhaozheng (simplified Chinese: 苏兆征; traditional Chinese: 蘇兆徵; pinyin: Sū Zhàozhēng) (1885 – 1929) was an early leader of the Chinese Communist Party and a labour movement activist.

== Early life ==
A native of the Qi'ao Island of Xiangshan County, Guangdong Province, he became a sailor, active in Sun Yatsen's nationalist organization Tongmenghui, and took part in organizing the Sailors' Union in 1920.

== Union leadership and Communist Party career ==
As Sailors' Union chairman he led the General 1922 seamen's strike of Hong Kong and the General Canton–Hong Kong strike in 1925. He later assumed the office of Chairman of the All-China Federation of Trade Unions and became a member of the Chinese Communist Party in 1925. He served in the Politburo Standing Committee of the 6th National Congress of the Chinese Communist Party.

Su participated in formulating the plan for the Guangzhou Uprising in 1927, and was elected President of Peasants' and Workers' Democratic Government of Guangzhou. Simultaneously, he acted as Minister of Labour in the Leftwing KMT Government of Wuhan.

== Death ==
He died from overwork in Shanghai in 1929.
