= Jintai Temple =

Buddhist temple complex in Zhuhai, China

- 金台寺
- Jintai Temple in Zhuhai, Guangdong, China

- Location in Guangdong

Religion
- Affiliation: Buddhism
- Status: Active

Location
- Location: Huangyang Mountain, Doumen, Zhuhai, Zhuhai, Guangdong
- Country: China
- Interactive map of Jintai Temple
- Coordinates: 22.22463°N 113.2239631°E

Architecture
- Type: Temple
- Style: Chinese architecture
- Founder: Zhao Shicong (original Vihara)
- Completed: Rebuilt in 1992

Jintai Temple (simplified Chinese: 金台寺; traditional Chinese: 金臺寺; pinyin: Jīn Tái Sì; Jyutping: Gam1 Toi4 Zi6*2) is a temple complex located on the southern slopes of the second peak of Huangyang Mountain in Doumen District, Zhuhai City, Guangdong Province.

== History ==
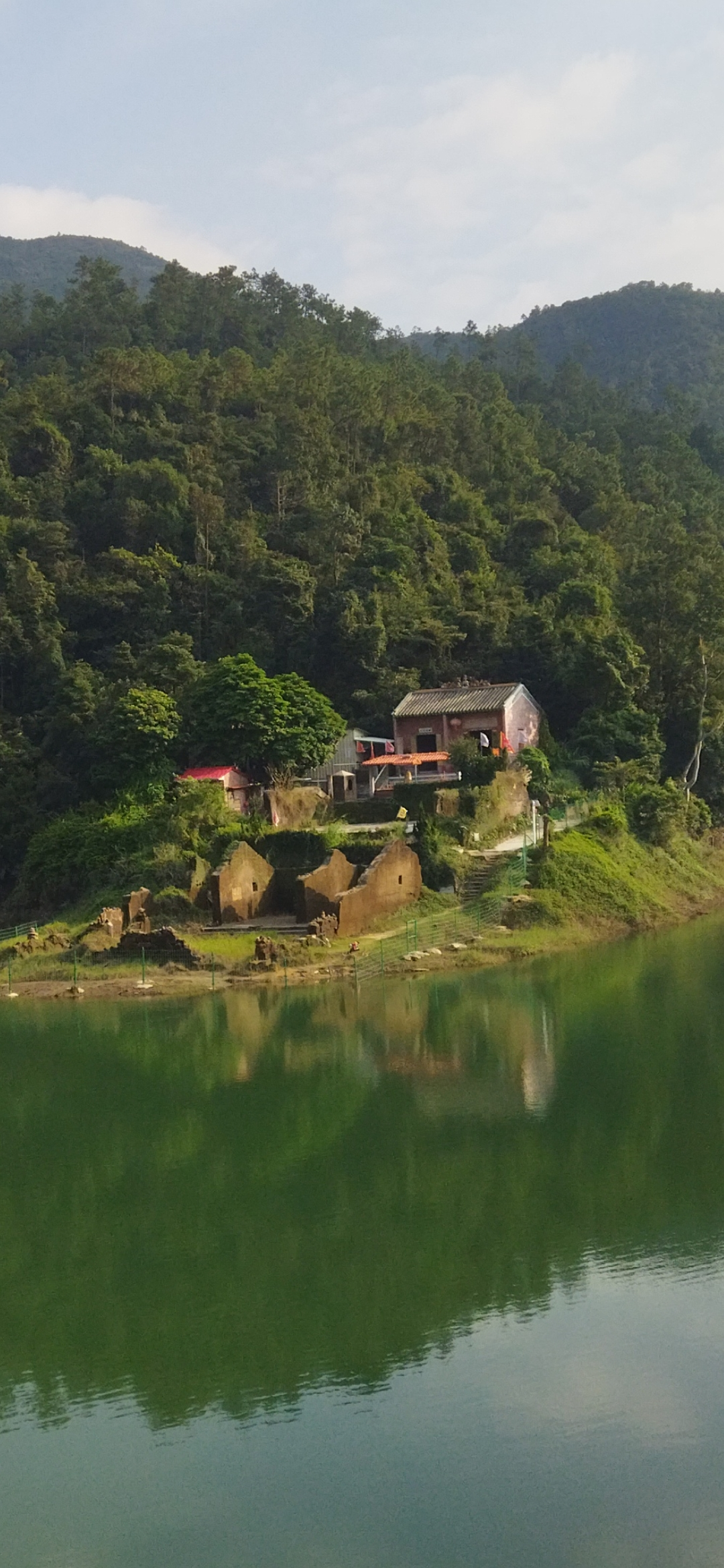
The ruins of the original Jintai Temple in 2023

At the end of the Southern Song dynasty, following the defeat of the Song army at the Battle of Yamen, Zhao Shizong, a Vice Minister of Imperial Clerks, along with Gong Xingqing, the Deputy of the Dali Temple, and Deng Guangjian, a scholar of the Hanlin Academy, established the temple here to escape the pursuing Yuan troops. In 1772, during the Qianlong era of the Qing dynasty, the temple underwent significant expansion, to over 3000 square meters.

After the establishment of the People's Republic of China, various political campaigns and hydraulic projects caused significant damage to Jintai Temple. During the Great Leap Forward in 1958, the main temple buildings were demolished. In 1992, Jintai Temple was rebuilt at a site on the southern foothills of Huangyang Mountain, as the original site was submerged and inaccessible.
