= El Piñal =

Location
- Country: China
- Location: Pearl River Delta

Details
- Opened: 1598–1600
- Operated by: Spain
- Type of harbour: Port

El Piñal (Portuguese: Pinhal, lit. 'Pine Grove') was a port in the Pearl River Delta area that was temporarily granted to the Spanish from 1598 to 1600 by Cantonese officials of the Ming dynasty. Seen as a threat to the Portuguese monopoly on the 16th century China trade, the Spanish presence in El Piñal provoked a violent reaction from Portuguese Macau nearby. El Piñal was soon abandoned, and its exact location remains a matter of scholarly debate.

== Location ==
The identification of El Piñal (or Pinhal) to a modern location is made difficult by incomplete and contradictory descriptions from surviving sources, as well as the shifting sediment of the Pearl River Delta altering the coastline from what it had been in the 16th century. The contemporary Spanish historian Antonio de Morga claimed El Piñal was 12 leagues from Canton (Guangzhou), while governor Francisco de Tello de Guzmán said it was 8 leagues. Jesuit missionaries who went to El Piñal said it was 10 to 12 leagues from Macau, a trip that took them 2 days. However, none of the above-mentioned the direction of these distances. Also, the same Jesuit source and the Chinese Annals of Guangdong Province (廣東通志) have suggested that El Piñal was an island. Based on these records, scholars have suggested that El Piñal may be located in the mouth of the Xi River west of Macau, or around Qi'ao Island in the Lingdingyang estuary.

Possible locations of El Piñal, 1598-1600.

Scholars who favour El Piñal being in the vicinity of the Xi River include Albert Kammerer, Jin Guoping, and Francisco Roque de Oliveira. The Annals of Guangdong Province relates that the "Lüsong" (呂宋, "Luzon", referring to the Spanish in the Philippines) settled in Hutiaomen (虎跳門, "Jumping Tiger Gate") in 1598, a place that still exists today in Xinhui at the mouth of the Hutiaomen Channel branch of the Xi River. Jesuit accounts tell of a Chinese temple complex in El Piñal, which Jin Guoping infers to be the shrine of the last Song emperor Zhao Bing, who fled the Mongols and perished at the 1279 Battle of Yamen across from Hutiaomen. Another identification of El Piñal, favoured by Albert Kammerer, is supported by a 1646 memorial by Jorge Pinto de Azevedo, which includes a map showing an island called "Pinhal" at the mouth of Xi River's main branch, near Lampacau. However, these hypothetical locations do not match up with the distances reported by the Portuguese and the Spanish travellers, and would likely take more than two days to reach from Macau.

Western scholarship generally agrees with J. M. Braga and C. R. Boxer's analysis that El Piñal was located in Lingdingyang between Macau and Guangzhou, around Qi'ao Island. Boxer reasoned since "Pinhal", which means "pine grove", was commonly used by Iberian explorers for place names, it would make sense that the port of Pinhal would be situated in a pine grove. Boxer identifies the anchorage of Tangjiawan (唐家灣) in Zhongshan Island as Pinhal, noting "this is the only place between the Bocca Tigris and Macao where a grove of pine trees has flourished for centuries". John Crossley took Boxer's identification of Tangjiawan to mean the Qi'ao Island in the vicinity. This location, next to the harbour of Cumsingmoon, was noted to have been used by foreign ships for centuries, and the British and Americans made heavy use of the port in the 19th century. The identification of Qi'ao as El Piñal accords well with the distances given by the Iberian sources, but, as Jin Guoping points out, it is based on speculation with little textual support.

== Background ==
In the 15th century, Spain and Portugal began extensive overseas exploration, setting in motion the Age of Discovery. Although the Treaty of Tordesillas of 1494 split the newly discovered lands between the two empires along a meridian west of the Cape Verde islands, with the west belonging to Spain and the east belonging to Portugal, the situation had not been clarified for the antimeridian on the opposite side of the world. The 1529 signing of the Treaty of Zaragoza theoretically resolved this issue with a line east of the Moluccas, with Spain claiming all lands east of the line and Portugal west; however, difficulties in marine navigation and cartography in the 16th century made the exact longitude of the line up to debate. Such that, when the Spanish colonized the Philippines in 1542, they believed it was within Spanish jurisdiction while in fact it was well west of the line.

Around the same time, the Portuguese gained permission from Ming Chinese mandarins to establish a permanent settlement and trade base in Macau in 1557, which would grow into a bustling entrepot by the 1580s due to Portugal's exclusive access to both Chinese and Japanese markets and the global demand for Chinese goods. The Portuguese succession crisis of 1580 led to the union of the Iberian empires, which opened new trade opportunities between the overseas settlements of the Spain and Portugal. Even so, unlike other Portuguese overseas territories that accepted the new political reality, Macau remained steadfast against Spanish intrusion into East Asia. The Portuguese in Macau feared that a Spanish presence nearby would not only disrupt their monopoly on the China trade, but also endanger the existence of Macau itself since any misguided action by the Spanish might cause the Chinese to close itself off against all Europeans. To prevent such a possibility, Macanese residents sought assurance from Philip II, king of both Spain and Portugal, that Spain be prevented from reaching China. This was received in 1585 when Philip II confirmed the continuation of the injunction forbidding Spain and Portugal from intruding each other's zones of influence. However, as Macau itself flouted these injunctions when it sent trade ships to Manila, so did Manila send ships to China in open disregard.

An early opportunity for Spain to enter China presented itself when the Chinese pirate Limahong attacked Manila in 1574. As Limahong was wanted by the Chinese authorities, officials in Fujian province were willing to let the Spanish establish a trade port on an island south of Xiamen in return for Limahong's capture. However, the governor of the Philippines at the time did not respond favourably, and the offer came to nothing when Limahong escaped from Manila. In the 1590s, the need for a Spanish base in China gained new urgency as Japan, ruled by the militant regent Toyotomi Hideyoshi, invaded Korea and threatened to conquer Ryukyu, China, Taiwan, and the Spanish Philippines. The San Felipe incident of 1596 and the subsequent execution of Franciscan friars in Nagasaki all but confirmed Japan's hostile intentions in Spanish eyes, and even the death of Hideyoshi in 1598 did not alleviate these fears. Thus, in 1598, governor Francisco de Tello de Guzmán sent Juan de Zamudio to the coast of China not only to establish trade, but also to warn Chinese authorities of possible Japanese aggression along its southern coast.

== Establishment ==
Some time later in 1598, Juan de Zamudio's frigate reached China and docked at Lantau Island, across the Lingdingyang estuary from Macau. From there Zamudio sent men to Guangzhou, the provincial capital of Guangdong, to negotiate for a port and permission to trade. With a gift of 7000 reals to the mandarins there (led by Dai Yao, Viceroy of Liangguang), the Spanish were allowed to establish themselves provisionally in El Piñal on the same terms as Siamese traders, albeit with a 50% higher tax rate than the Portuguese. This was done over the objections of the Macanese, who sent a delegation to the provincial capital advocating the repulsion of the Spanish. The Cantonese superintendent of coastal defense (海道副使; haitao in old European sources) was specifically recorded to have expressed that if they acceded to Portuguese meddling on this matter, the people of Macau "would become more arrogant". This indicates that the Spanish in El Piñal might have been intended as an offset to Portuguese influence in the region. In addition, the enterprising Cantonese officials might have been emboldened by the commercial success of Portuguese Macau to allow Spain, with their easy access to American gold and silver mines, to settle nearby. On the other hand, the imperial court in Beijing favoured the prohibitionist haijin policies, making it a real possibility that both Portugal and Spain's permission to stay in the Pearl River Delta could be revoked for any perceived misbehaviour. It was this worry that prevented the Portuguese from attacking El Piñal outright.

Around the same time as Juan Zamudio's voyage to China, on 17 September 1598, the former Philippines governor Luis Pérez Dasmariñas left Manila with three ships on an expedition to Cambodia to support its king against Siam. Soon after, the armada was scattered by heavy storms, with Dasmariñas's ship, carrying 120 men, drifting into the port of El Piñal where they met up with Zamudio. There it was decided that Zamudio would go back to Manila to report on the fate of Dasmariñas's expedition and seek reinforcements for Dasmariñas, who stayed behind in hopes of contacting the other ships of his armada.

== Conflict with the Portuguese ==
The establishment of El Piñal and the coincidental arrival of Luis Pérez Dasmariñas brought considerable unease to Portuguese Macau. The effect on commerce became readily apparent: Spanish competition drove up the price of Chinese goods and thus affected Portuguese purchasing power and their resale margins. The captain-major overseeing Macau, Paulo de Portugal, had to respond in Macau's interests — he had previously urged Dasmariñas to leave with Zamudio, and now responded to Dasmariñas's defiance with open hostility. A blockade was formed around El Piñal, and a public warning was posted in Macau which forbade any help being given to the Spanish on pain of serious penalties and that if any of them came into the city they would be arrested. Dasmariñas even received word that the Portuguese "will try to harm you [Dasmariñas] as much as possible, and that let be clear that if they could, they would set you on fire."

Blockaded in El Piñal, the Spanish persisted with the help from sympathetic mendicant orders in Macau supplying El Piñal in secret. However, this help was limited, and throughout the year 1599 the Spanish were worn down by attrition, leaving the men sick and weak and on the verge of revolt. As it became clear that Manila was not going to send reinforcements, the Spanish got ready to leave El Piñal, but was delayed by Chinese bureaucracy, as various customs dues needed to be paid before the Chinese authorized their departure.

On 16 November 1599, Dasmariñas set off for Manila but was met with unfavourable winds such that he had to return to the coast of China. Rather than to risk offending Portuguese sensibilities again, Dasmariñas did not return to El Piñal but went to Lampacau, an island west of Macau formerly settled by the Portuguese. There he communicated with Paulo de Portugal that he had no intention to harm Portuguese interests, and as proof of that goodwill, promised that he would seek authorization for Macau to trade with Manila legally, and leave China by February 1600. The two reached an agreement on paper, and Paulo de Portugal gave his guarantee for Dasmariñas's safety.

In practice, Paulo de Portugal was pressured by the Macanese community to make a move against Dasmariñas in Lampacau, and the Viceroy of Goa gave de Portugal the permission to use force on the Spanish. As preparations against Dasmariñas were underway, Dasmariñas received warnings about the upcoming Portuguese action, but he dismissed these as rumours since he did not believe the captain-major would go back on his word. Thus on 17 January 1600, when de Portugal brought a heavily armed fleet to confront the Spanish (by this time reduced to one Chinese junk), Dasmariñas was caught unawares. De Portugal was to arrest Dasmariñas and send him to Goa, but Dasmariñas could not be enticed to surrender. Finally, the ships fired at each other for several hours, causing deaths and loss of cargo on the Spanish side. The Spanish eventually disentangled their junk from the fray and took shelter in the bay of Guanghai to the west, and returned for Manila some time later.

== Aftermath ==
In the immediate aftermath of the Pinhal episode, King Philip III made it known to the Real Audiencia of Manila that he did not approve of Juan Zamudio's voyage that resulted in the establishment of El Piñal. However, he also asked the governor of the Philippines to form a council facilitating a return to El Piñal. In any case, Spain did not return to El Piñal, and the Pinhal episode represented the end of Spain's attempts to circumvent the restrictions placed on them from reaching China. Sino-Spanish trade would hence be carried mostly by Chinese merchants going to Manila until the founding of Spanish Formosa in 1626. A plan was drawn up in 1627 to reclaim the port of El Piñal for Spain, but it did not lead to anything substantial.

On the Portuguese side, the Pinhal episode left them exasperated and paranoid against further threats to their interests. This was such that in 1601, when Dutch ships came to Macau looking for El Piñal, the Macanese residents reacted harshly, imprisoning the Dutch reconnaissance party and summarily executed 17 Dutchmen. This violent beginning to Luso-Dutch relations in the East would culminate in the Dutch-Portuguese War, where not only was Macau attacked in 1622, but Portuguese influence in the Far East would also become greatly diminished by the end of the war in 1661.
