= Lampacau =

Coordinates: 22.077°N 113.440°E

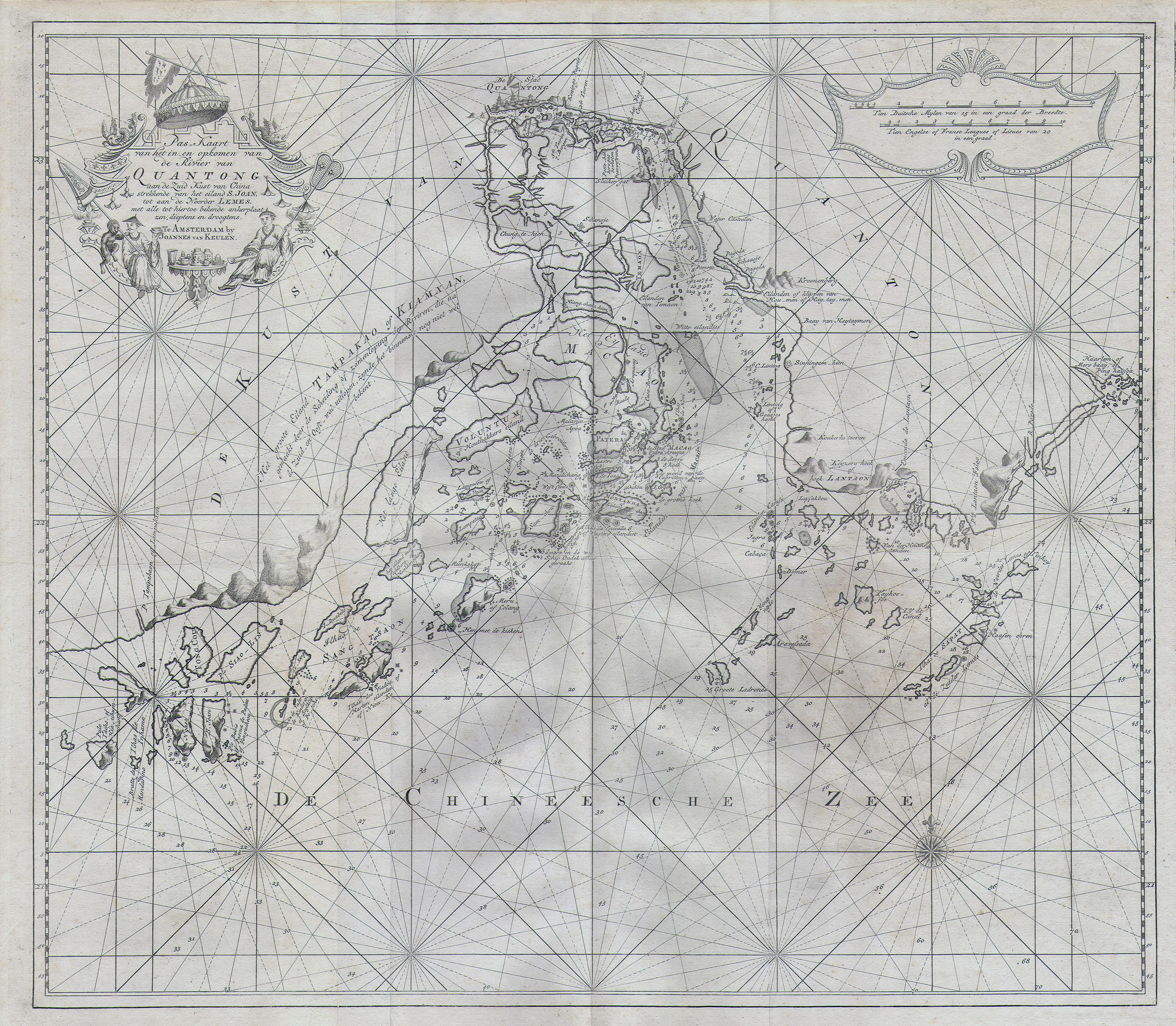
- An 18th-century Dutch map, displaying Lampecou and Lampetao in the labyrinth of islands west of Macao
- Chinese: 浪白澳
Transcriptions
Standard Mandarin
- Hanyu Pinyin: Làngbáiào

Langbaizao
- Traditional Chinese: 浪白竈
- Simplified Chinese: 浪白灶
Transcriptions
Standard Mandarin
- Hanyu Pinyin: Làngbáizào

Langbaijiao
- Chinese: 浪白滘
Transcriptions
Standard Mandarin
- Hanyu Pinyin: Làngbáijiào

Lampacau or Lampacao, also known by other names, was a small island in the Pearl River Delta, which in the mid-16th century played an important role in Sino-Portuguese trade. Lampacau no longer exists as a separate island, as sedimentary deposits from the Pearl River system resulted in it becoming a part of a larger island.

== Location ==
The exact location of Lampacau has been a somewhat of a puzzle to the students of the region's historical geography, since both the coastlines and the place names in the area have changed significantly since the 16th century. The Portuguese maps of the period showed it located somewhat west of Macau, but closer to that city than Shangchuan (São João, "St John's Island") farther to the southwest. According to the research of Chang Tseng-hsin, making use of both Chinese and Western sources, Lampacau has become connected with the neighboring island of Lianwan (連灣山). The name of Lianwan was thus used for the entire "new" greater island, and the name Langbaiao became relegated to the narrow straight separating Lianwan from the nearby Wenwan Island (文灣山). This would place Lampacau within the Jinwan District of present-day Zhuhai, some 30 kilometers (19 mi) west of Macao and much closer than that to Zhuhai Sanzao Airport.

== Name ==
Over the last 100 years, there has been a lively debate of what the "proper" name of the island was during its heyday. The most recent survey of the literature on that topic is probably the page-long note in Witek & al. It lists the following spelling variants as attested in European sources, mostly Portuguese: Lampacau, Lampacam, Lam Puk, Lanpacan, Lampachan, Lampchào, Lamapacào, Lamapzan, Lanpetan, Lampaço; Lan-pai-kao (in Mandarin) and Long-pa-kao (in Cantonese); Langpetsao. They note that the character 滘 (Cantonese: j gaau³; notionally Mandarin: p jiao) is a Cantonese character and does not often appear in standard Chinese dictionaries; it is thus only natural that the name of the place would be written differently in most Chinese sources. Modern Chinese variants include Langbaiao, Langbaizao, and Lanbaijiao. (Note: Langbaijiao is the preferred spelling of Witek and Sebes)

== History ==
Lampacau became important for the international trade c. 1550, when the center of the Portuguese offshore trade in the Pearl River Delta gradually shifted there from the more remote Shangchuan. Ptak speculates that it was a more convenient base for the transshipment of cargoes to and from sampans and other river boats traveling to the interior of Guangdong. The brief period of Lampacau's significance ended some time c. 1560, as the Portuguese trade moved to the recently established permanent base, Macau.

== See also ==
- Portuguese Macau
- Nei Lingding ("Lintin") & Shangchuan ("St John's")
- 1554 Luso-Chinese Accord
- El Piñal
