= 1922 seamen's strike =

Labor action by Chinese sailors

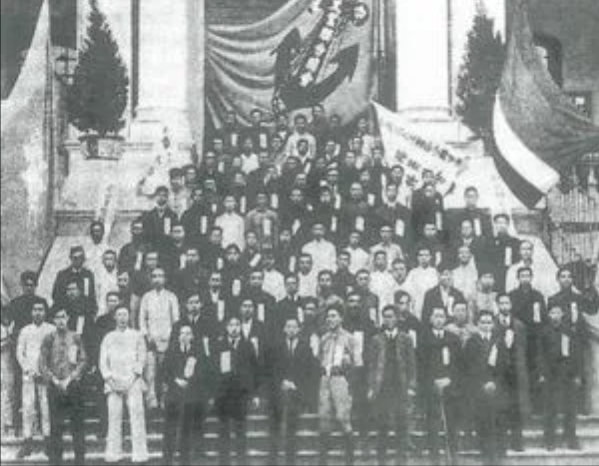
Strikers flanked by their labor union flag and the republican flag.

The Seamen's Strike of 1922 began on 12 January 1922, when Chinese seamen from Hong Kong and Canton (now Guangzhou) went on strike for higher wages. Led by the Seamen's Union after shipping companies refused to increase salaries by 40%, the strike quickly garnered over 30,000 participants, greatly disrupting everyday colonial life and food shipments to Hong Kong. Though the strike was declared illegal by the Hong Kong government, negotiations eventually took place after 52 days, with employers capitulating on 5 March 1922 and agreeing to wage increases of 15–30%.

The Seamen's Strike had strictly economic roots—seamen's wages stayed the same while post-World War One inflation increased living costs, they were paying a lower salary than the law allowed, and they were underemployed and underpaid while ashore. Meanwhile, foreign seamen were paid 75–80% more than Cantonese workers for doing the same job.

Flag of China Sailors' Union, organiser of the strike

In November 1921, the Seamen's Union, which represented all Chinese seamen, had demanded wage increases to close the gap between the Chinese and the non-Chinese seamen who received much higher pay. The shipping companies refused to increase their salary, and the union reacted by going on strike starting in January 1922. By February 1922, over $5 million in cargo had been tied up in the Hong Kong harbor, causing shipping companies to start to bypass Hong Kong in their shipping routes. The Seamen's Union was at the same time organizing other workers and unions in the city, hoping to extend their scope to a general strike. By early March, the city was approaching anarchy, with trash piling up, businesses closed, public transportation stopped, and food rationed.

The Emergency Regulations Ordinance was passed by the colonial administration in a single day – 28 February 1922 – to combat the strikes.

== See also ==
- Su Zhaozheng
- Canton–Hong Kong strike
