= Zhuhai International School =

International school in Zhuhai, China

Coordinates: 22.39684°N 113.64735°E

- Simplified Chinese: 珠海国际学校
- Traditional Chinese: 珠海國際學校
Transcriptions
Standard Mandarin
- Hanyu Pinyin: Zhūhǎi Guójì Xuéxiào
Yue: Cantonese
- Jyutping: zyu1 hoi2 gwok3 zai3 hok6 haau6

Zhuhai International School (ZIS, Chinese: 珠海国际学校) is an international school on Qi Ao Island in Zhuhai, Guangdong, China. The school offers International Baccalaureate courses from Nursery level to Year 13 for students ages 3 to 18.
