= Lianzhou, Zhuhai =

Lianzhou 莲洲镇
- Town
- Location in Guangdong
- Coordinates: 22.3187°N 113.2073°E
- Country: People's Republic of China
- Province: Guangdong
- Prefecture-level city: Zhuhai
- District: Doumen District
- Time zone: UTC+8 (China Standard)

Lianzhou (Chinese: 莲洲) is a town of Doumen District, Zhuhai, Guangdong, China. As of 2018, it has 3 residential communities and 27 villages under its administration.
