= Cumsingmoon =

Anchorage in Zhuhai, Guangdong, China

Coordinates: 22°22′53.1″N 113°37′31.1″E

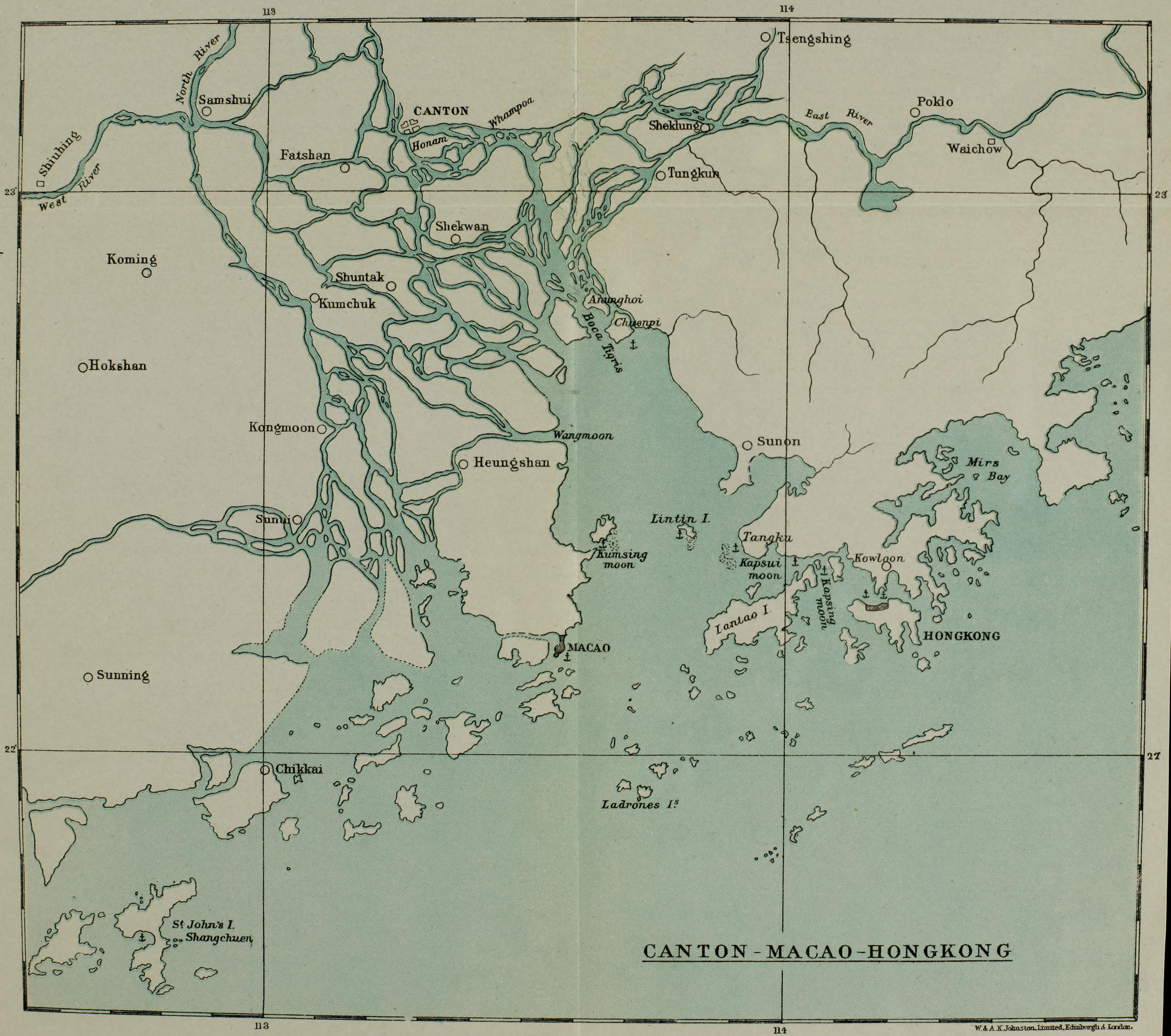
- 1910 map of the Pearl River estuary, showing "Kumsing moon" northeast of Macao. The harbour is located in the straits between the mainland and the island of Qi'ao.
- Traditional Chinese: 金星門港
- Simplified Chinese: 金星门港
- Literal meaning: Gate of Venus harbour
Transcriptions
Standard Mandarin
- Hanyu Pinyin: Jīnxīngmén gǎng
Yue: Cantonese
- Yale Romanization: Gāmsīngmùhn góng

Cumsingmoon or Jinxingmen (Chinese: 金星门港) is an anchorage in Zhuhai, Guangdong, on the southern coast of China, within the Pearl River estuary and close to the former European colonies of Macao and Hong Kong.

In the early years of British Hong Kong in the 1840s, Cumsingmoon, together with Nan'ao, was home to an informal "counter-colony" jointly managed by opium merchants and local Chinese officials, helping traders to evade the colonial administration. In 1845, this settlement comprised a self-governing community of 5,000 Chinese and European traders.

El Piñal, a port granted to Spain by the Ming dynasty in 1598–1600, has speculatively been identified with Cumsingmoon.
