= Canton–Hong Kong strike =

1925-1926 strike and boycott in Hong Kong and China

- Part of the Chinese Communist Revolution
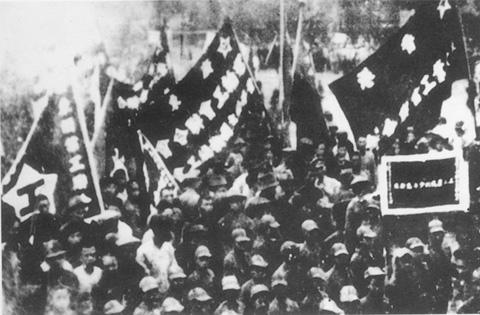
- Date: 19 June 1925 – October 1926
- Location: British Hong Kong, Guangzhou

Parties
Labor unions in Hong Kong; Kuomintang; Chinese Communist Party	British Hong Kong

Lead figures
Deng Zhongxia; Su Zhaozheng	Reginald Stubbs; Claud Severn

Number
150,000+	

Casualties and losses
Deaths: 100+	

Canton–Hong Kong strike
- Traditional Chinese: 省港大罷工
- Simplified Chinese: 省港大罢工
- Literal meaning: Provincial capital Hong Kong Big Strike
Transcriptions
Standard Mandarin
- Hanyu Pinyin: Shěng Gǎng Dà Bàgōng
- Wade–Giles: Shêng3 Kang3 Ta4 Pa4-kung1
Yue: Cantonese
- Yale Romanization: Sáang góng daaih bah gūng
- Jyutping: Saang2 gong2 daai6 baa6 gung1

The Canton–Hong Kong strike was a strike and boycott that took place in British Hong Kong and Guangzhou (Canton), Republic of China, from June 1925 to October 1926. It started out as a response to the May Thirtieth Movement shooting incidents in which Chinese protesters were fired upon by Sikh detachments of the Shanghai Municipal Police in the Shanghai International Settlement.

== Background ==
On May 30, 1925, Sikh detachments of the Shanghai Municipal Police opened fire on a crowd of Chinese demonstrators in the Shanghai International Settlement. Demonstrators were protesting the killing of a Chinese worker at a Japanese-owned cotton factory during a recent strike. At least nine demonstrators were killed, and many others wounded.

== Strike ==
Prominent Chinese citizens in Guangdong called for an anti-British strike, especially in British Hong Kong. The Kuomintang leaders and Soviet advisors even considered attacking the Anglo-French Settlement in Shameen. Anti-British pamphlets were passed around in Hong Kong, and rumours spread that the colonial authorities planned to poison Hong Kong's water supplies.

Chinese Communist Party-affiliated unions began the strike on 19 June 1925. The strike initially began without union leadership approval. The strikers list of demands included: freedom to gather, organize, speak, publish, and strike; equal treatment of all Hong Kongers under the law, and the abolition of laws targeting Chinese residents; universal suffrage; labor laws, including an eight-hour day and a minimum wage, the abolition of contract labor, better working conditions for women and children, and workers' insurance, with representatives from labor unions included when drafting these laws; the cancellation of a proposed rent increase replaced with a 40% cut in rent; and freedom of residence to Chinese people in Hong Kong.

The strikers established the Strikers' Delegates Congress, a decision-making body with 800 delegates from the striking unions. The body met every other day and published its minutes and resolutions in a magazine titled Workers' Road. It also established an elected strike committee, chaired by Su Zhaozheng, which focused on implementing congress' decisions. The congress passed around 300 resolutions; including resolutions requiring unions to be organized democratically with an elected committee and hold regular meetings. The congress eventually established a court to arbitrate disputes, with an American correspondent for The Nation describing it as "the only court in China where civil cases were properly tried."

On 23 June 1925, around 100,00 Cantonese people held a march to Hong Kong in solidarity with the strike. British soldiers in Shamian opened fire on the march and killed over 50 Chinese protesters and wounded almost 200. In August 1925, striker began blocking only British ships from accessing Hong Kong and allowing all other naval traffic. Workers patrols along borders and ports to combat efforts to smuggle British goods. Guangdong offered free train passage to Hong Kong. In the first week of protest, more than 50,000 Chinese citizens left Hong Kong. Food prices soared, and the colony was a ghost town by July. By the end of July, some 250,000 Chinese left for Guangdong.

On 4 November 1925, Cai Hesen's brother, Cai Linzheng, was shot and killed while leading a workers' picket team during the strike.

In March 1926, Chiang Kai-shek declared martial law in Guangzhou and detained multiple left-wing strike leaders. By April 1926, the right-wing of the Kuomintang (KMT) began calling for the strike to end and curtailed the strike committee's ability to make arrests. The KMT then led negotiations with the British government. The strike ended in October 1926 with the strikers achieving few of their original demands.

== Impact ==
The British government had to provide a trade loan of 3 million pounds to prevent the economy from collapsing. Hong Kong's top two colonial officials, Governor Sir Reginald Stubbs and Colonial Secretary Claud Severn, were replaced in 1925 as a consequence of the crisis, under criticism from James Jamieson, the British Consul General in Canton. Jamieson claimed the two were out of touch and out of date, unable to converse in Chinese and were ignorant of the political situation in China.

An anti-British boycott continued for several more months. The economy was paralysed and Hong Kong's total trade fell by 50%, shipping diminished by 40%, and rents decreased by 60%, which lasted until the end of the boycott.

Over 80 unions formed during the strike.

== Legacy ==
The Canton–Hong Kong strike plays a prominent part in André Malraux's 1928 novel The Conquerors.

In 2025, the Hong Kong Federation of Trade Unions held a centennial event of the strike.

== See also ==
- History of colonial Hong Kong
- History of the Republic of China
- 1922 seamen's strike
