= Xiangshan County, Guangdong =

Former county in Guangdong

Xiangshan County, Guangdong Heungshan
- County
- Location of Zhongshan in Guangdong
- Country: Great Qing Empire; Republic of China
- Province: Guangdong
- County-level divisions: None

Xiangshan County
- Traditional Chinese: 香山縣
- Simplified Chinese: 香山县
- Literal meaning: Fragrant Mountain
Transcriptions
Standard Mandarin
- Hanyu Pinyin: Xiāngshān Xiàn
- Wade–Giles: Hsiang-shan Hsien
Yue: Cantonese
- Yale Romanization: Hēung-sāan Yuhn
- Jyutping: Hoeng1 Saan1 Jyun2

Xiangshan County, also spelled Hsiangshan, Siangshan, Heungsan, and Heungshan, was a former county in Southern central China. From 1912, it was a county in Guangdong Province, in the Republic of China. It was renamed Zhongshan (then usually romanized "Chungshan") in April 1925, in honor of the founder of the Republic of China, Sun Yat Sen, a Xiangshan native.

The county covered the modern-day Zhuhai City, Zhongshan City and a part of Nansha District of Guangzhou City in the Guangdong Province of the People's Republic of China (PRC), and the Macau Special Administrative Region of the People's Republic of China, formerly known as Portuguese Macau until 1999.

== History ==
The county consists of the entirety of Xiangshan Island, an island in a bay where three rivers emptied into the sea, part of the Pearl River Delta. It was originally separated from the continent by the distributaries in the delta, until it became a peninsula some time during the 17th century, but remained separated from the mainland by waterways.

Around the 8th century (during the Tang dynasty), a Xiangshan Township was carved out of the Bao'an County and Dongguan County, at the present-day Shanchang (山場) of Zhuhai. Around the 12th century (during the Northern Song dynasty), this township became a separate county.

During the mid-16th century, in the Ming dynasty, the Portuguese settled in Macau. This was permitted by the Ming dynasty, but despite the Portuguese presence, Macau was still under the jurisdiction of Xiangshan.) Macau became a full Portuguese colony in 1847. This colony later expanded to include Ilha Verde, Taipa and Coloane.

In December 1952, Yumin County (漁民縣) was created out of islands from Hsiang-shan County, Pao-an County and Tung-kuan County. This county was renamed Chu-hai County (珠海縣) in April 1953, and was expanded. Chu-hai County was briefly merged with Hsiang-shan County in March 1959, and was reconstituted in April 1961.

From 1961 onwards, the territory of Chung-shan County was reduced by 43%, with areas ceded to the counties of Tou-men, Pan-yu, Shun-te and Hsin-huei. Its romanization was changed to Zhuhai following the introduction of the Pinyin orthography for romanizing Chinese characters.

In 1979, Zhuhai County (珠海县) became Zhuhai City (珠海市). In December 1983, Zhongshan County (中山县) became Zhongshan City (中山市). Originally a county-level city, Zhongshan was elevated to prefecture level in January 1988.

A 6.81-square kilometer special economic zone was established within Zhuhai City in August 1980. The special economic zone was expanded to 15.16 square kilometers in June 1983, and 121 square kilometers in April 1989. In May 1983, Doumen County (斗門县) became administrated under Zhuhai City.

== See also ==
- Hong Kong, special administrative region of China named after 香; 'Fragrant'.
