= Xianglu Bay =

Bay of Guangdong

- 香炉湾
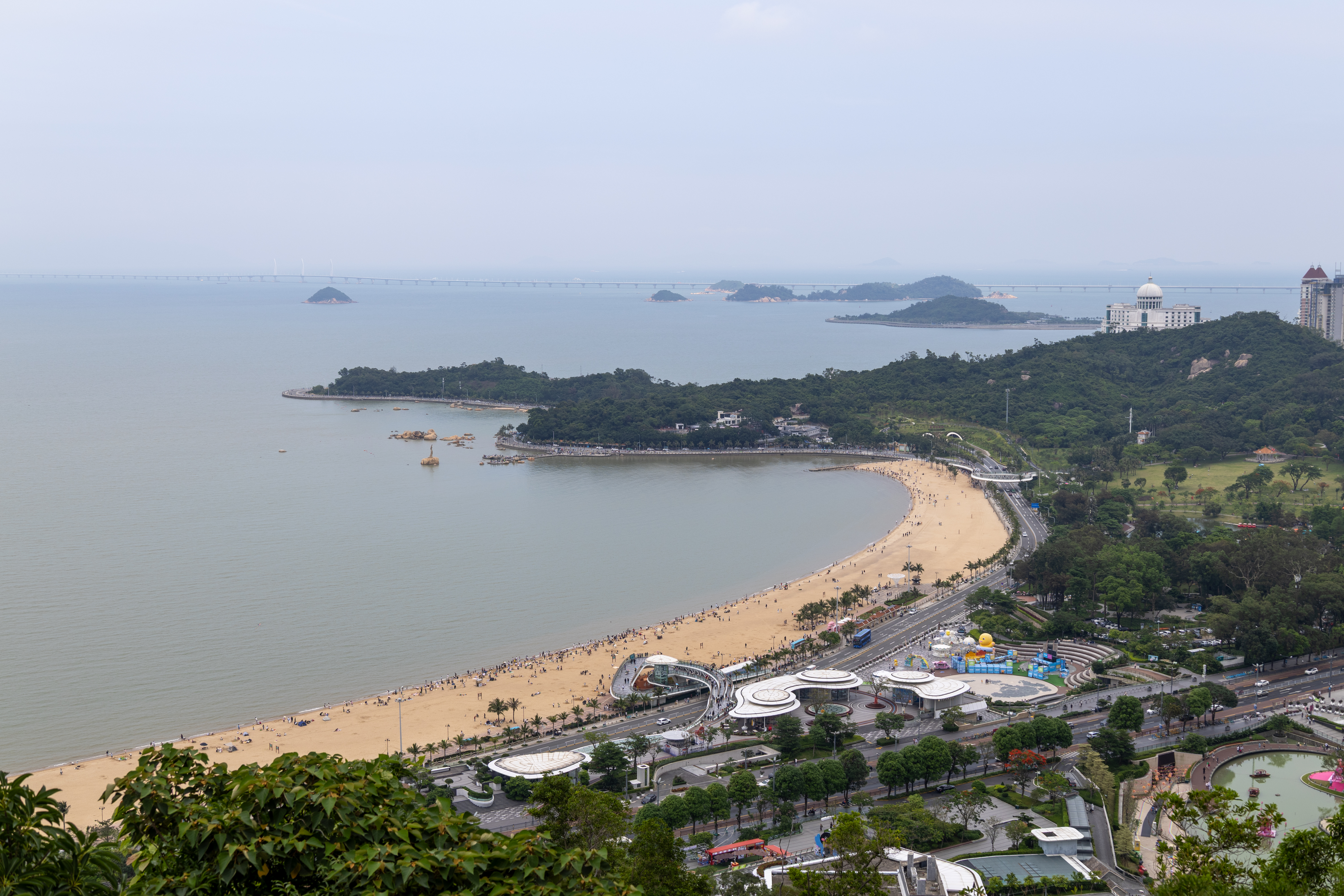
- Xianglu Bay in 2026
- Interactive map of Xianglu Bay
- Location: Zhuhai, Guangdong
- Coordinates: 22.27°N 113.585°E
- Type: Bay
- Basin countries: China

Xianglu Bay (Chinese: 香炉湾) is a body of water located near Zhuhai, Guangdong, China.

== Geography ==
The shoreline in concave in shape. The Zhuhai Fisher Girl is located within the bay. The 55-kilometre (34 mi) Zhuhai Lovers Road runs along the bay.

The beach is about 4.8 kilometres (3 mi) long and a few hundred meters wide.

== History ==
In 2016, a restoration project was made along the beach of Xianglu Bay.
