= Qi'ao Island =

Island in Zhuhai, China

Coordinates: 22.41616°N 113.63719°E

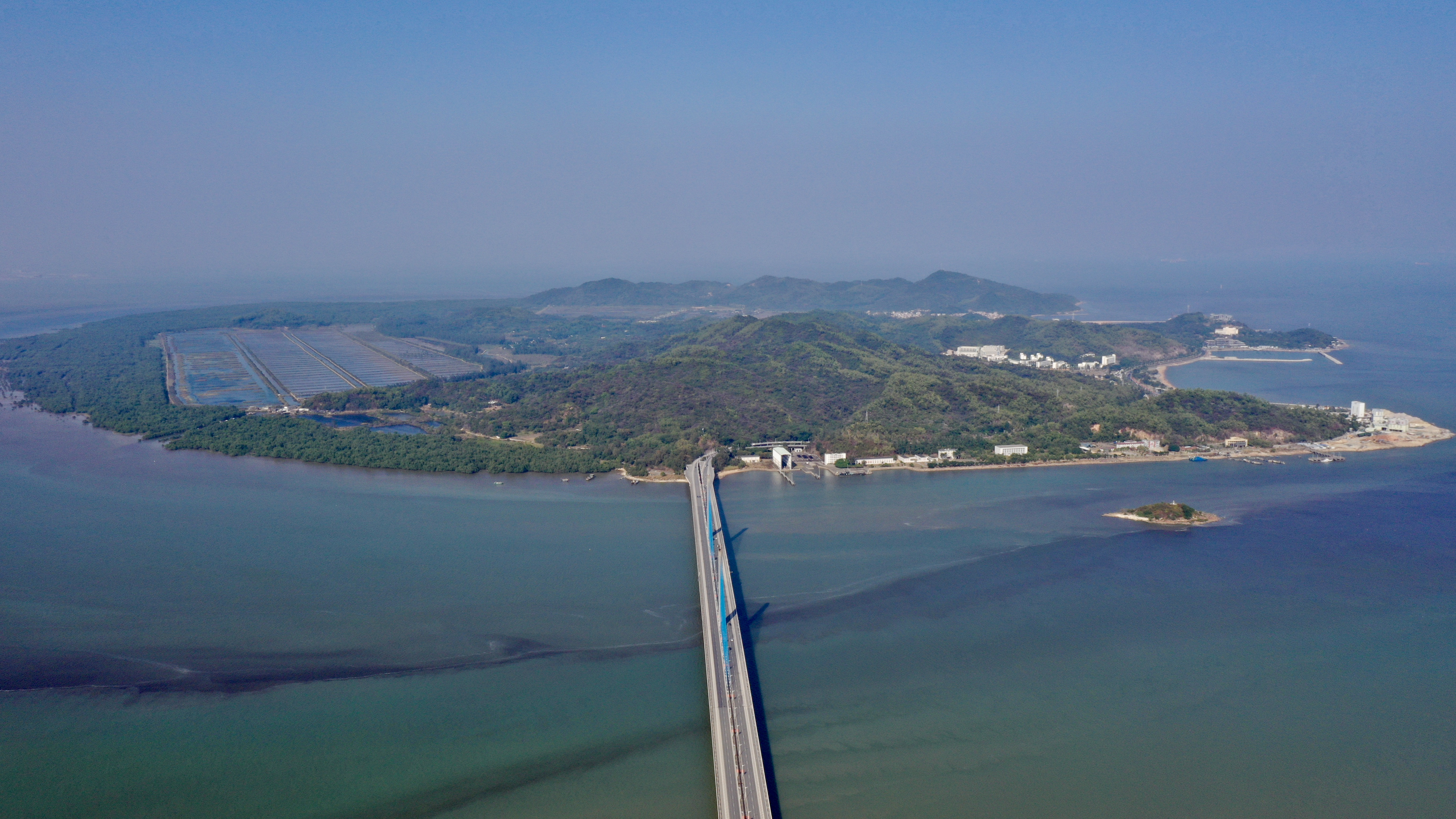
Qi'ao Island

Qi'ao Island (Chinese: 淇澳岛) is an island of Zhuhai, Guangdong province, China.

== Introduction ==
Qi'ao Island is located in the northeast Xiangzhou District of Zhuhai, 13 km away from it. Totally, it covers an area of 23.8 square kilometers. There are about 1,900 inhabitants. Forest coverage reaches 90%.

== History ==
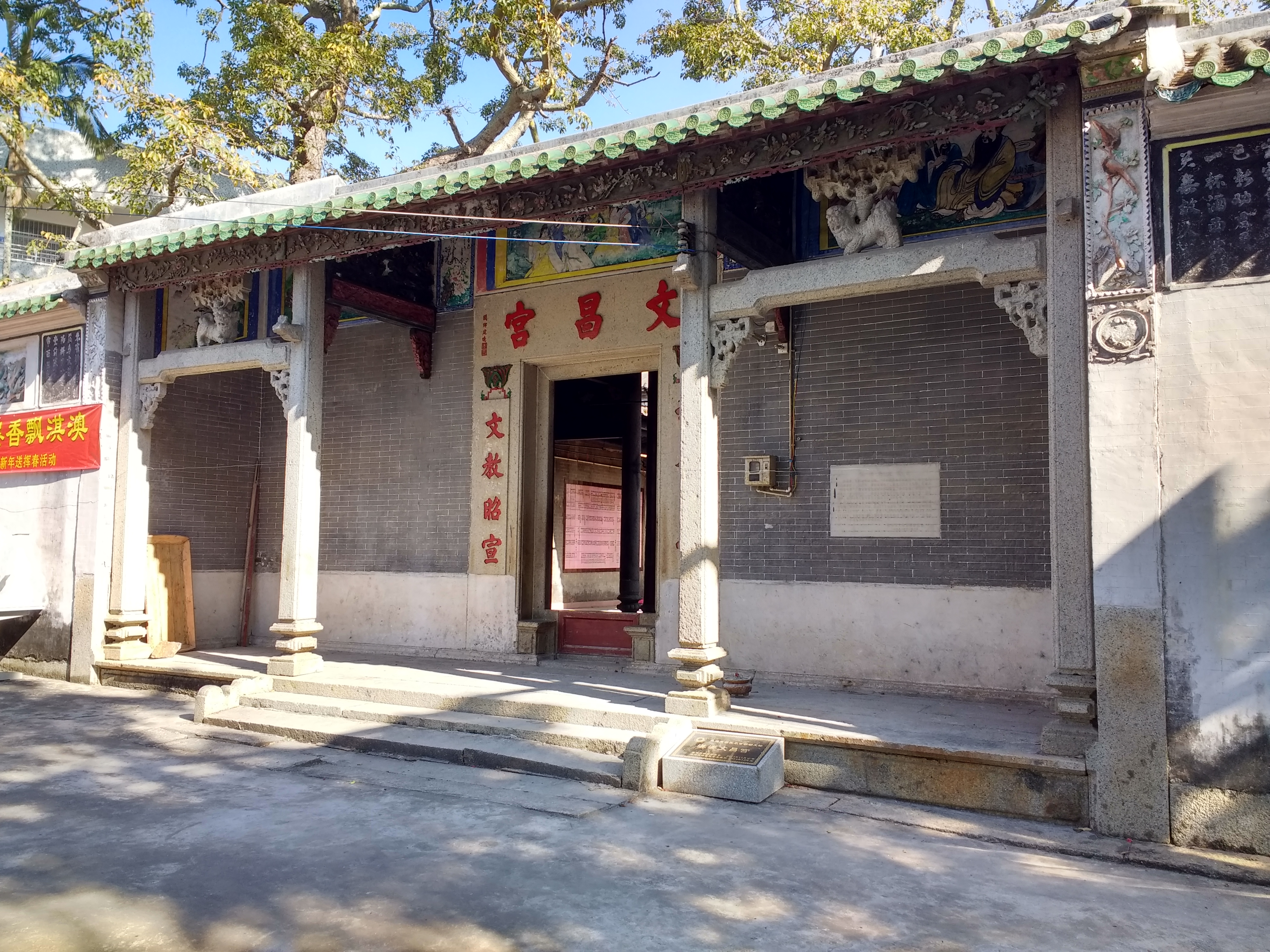
Wenchang Palace

In the ancient ruins of Housha Bay and Dong'ao Bay, archaeologists discovered plentiful colored pottery and white pottery which can date back to 4,500 to 5,000 years ago. These pottery are evidence of the most early history of this city, and Dong'ao Bay is the most typical and complete gravel ruins of Pearl River Delta. In this small island, there are 17 temples here, which discloses the richness of its historic memories. For instance, Cundong started building in the Song dynasty and Wenchang Palace (文昌宮) built in the Qing dynasty during the reign of the Tongzhi Emperor.

== Educational base ==
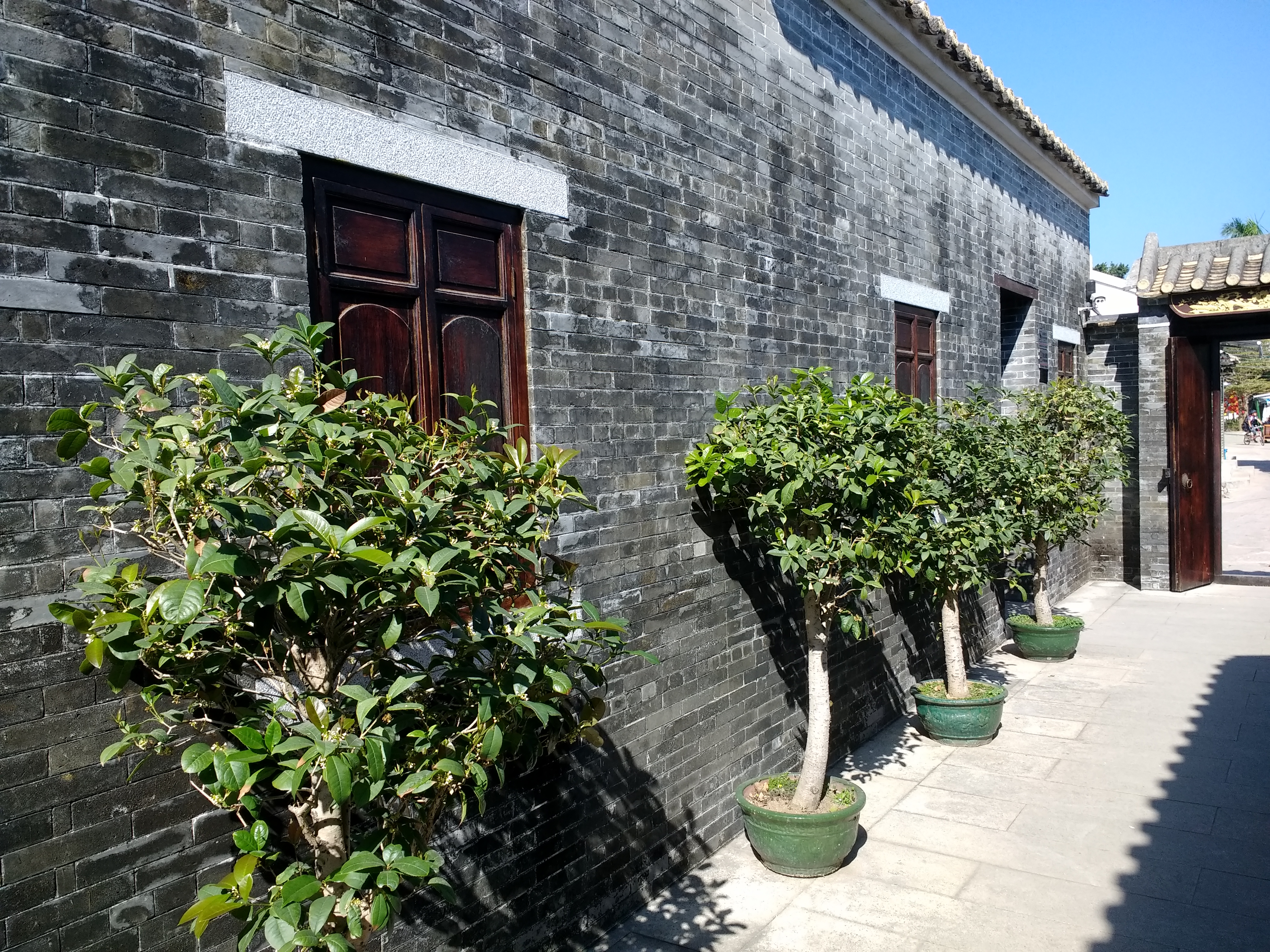
Su Zhaozheng's historic home

Given the Qi'ao Cun Event in 1833, a famous patriotic poem called Guo Ling Ding Yang by Wen Tianxiang, and the preservation of Su Zhaozheng's Former Residence, in 2000, 20 CPPCC members proposed Qi'ao Island as a nationwide educational base.

== Scenic spots ==
In 2000, it was identified as an ecological tourist zone of Zhuhai. The island is noted for its seafood, such as oysters and Niwei chicken. To commemorate the handover of Macau, the artist Pan He installed the 9.9-metre (32 ft) tall statue Reunion (重逢) on the island.

== See also ==
- Qi'ao Bridge
- Cumsingmoon
- Zhuhai International School
