= Zhuhai Special Economic Zone =

Special economic zone in China

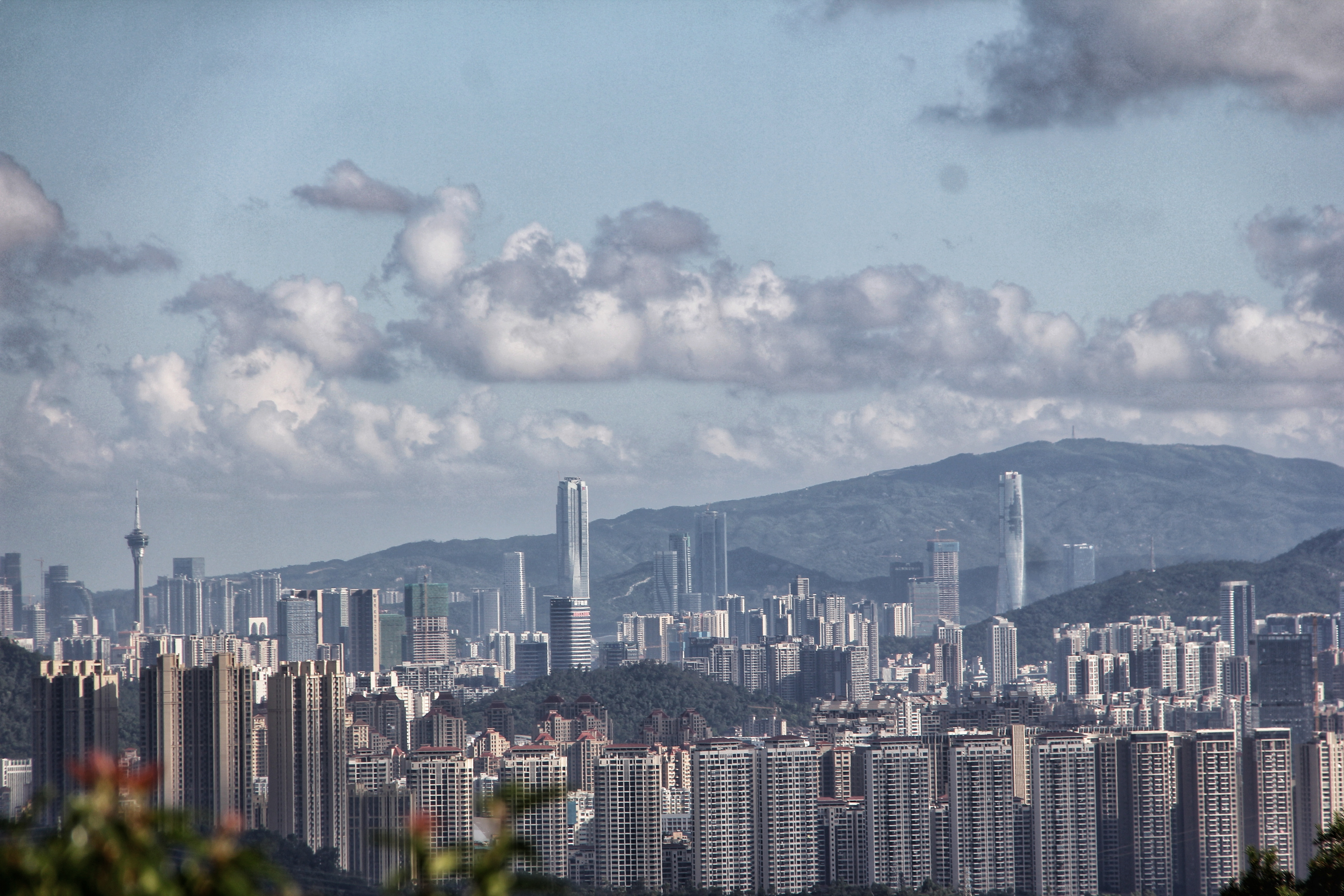
Downtown of Zhuhai

Zhuhai Special Economic Zone (Chinese: 珠海经济特区) is a special economic zone encompassing the city of Zhuhai, in the Guangdong province of the People's Republic of China. It was established on 5 August 1980, originally comprising a territory of 6.1 km^{2}. The zone was expanded to 15.16 km^{2} on 29 June 1983, and 121 km^{2} on 5 April 1989.
