= Doumen, Zhuhai =

Doumen 斗门区
- District
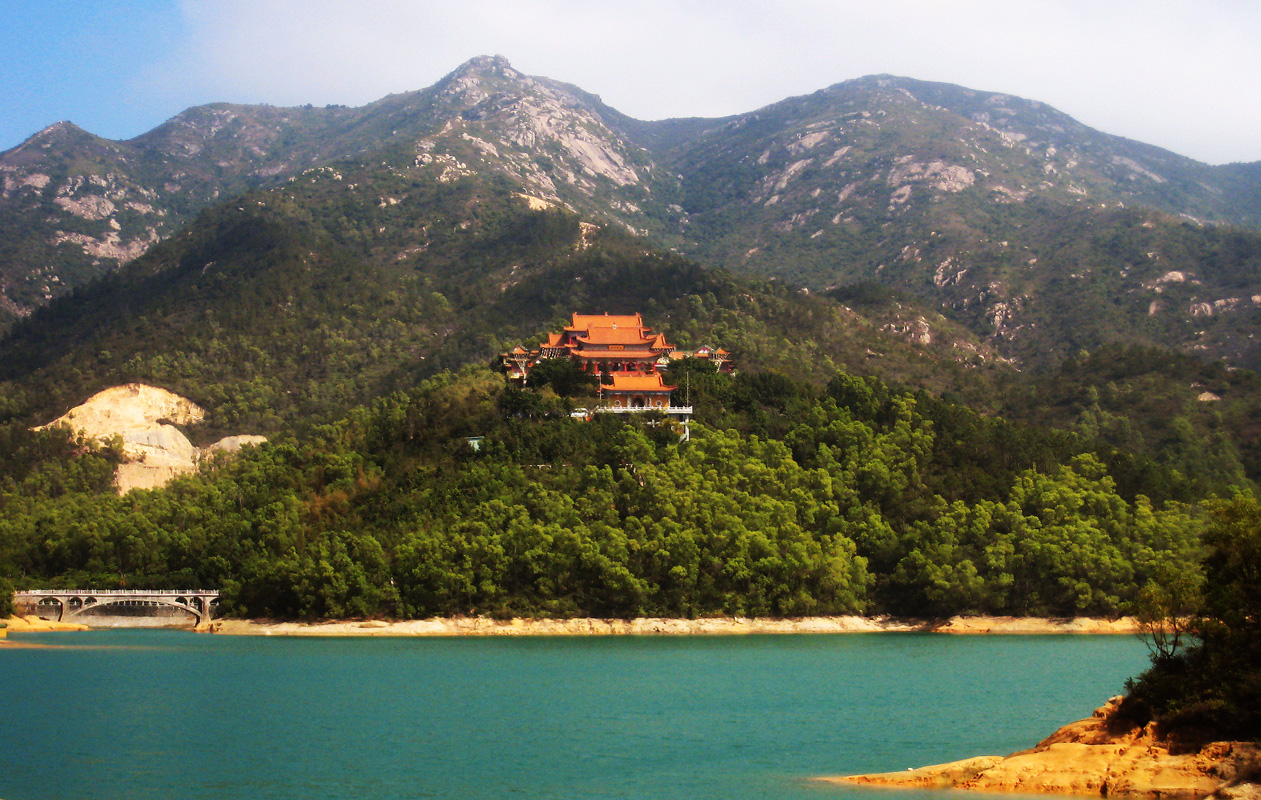
- Jintai Temple
- Interactive map of Doumen
- Location in Guangdong
- Coordinates: 22°12′52″N 113°15′33″E
- Country: People's Republic of China
- Province: Guangdong
- Prefecture-level city: Zhuhai

Area
  - Total: 806 km^{2} (311 sq mi)

Population (2020)
  - Total: 608,899
  - Density: 755/km^{2} (1,960/sq mi)
- Time zone: UTC+8 (China Standard)

Doumen District (simplified Chinese: 斗门区; traditional Chinese: 斗門區; pinyin: Dǒumén Qū; Jyutping: dau^{2}mun^{4} keoi^{1}; lit. 'Bucket Gate') is a district of Zhuhai, Guangdong Province, China. Doumen town is the home of the Zhaozhen Museum, named after U.S. Army Colonel, John C. Young (Chinese: 容兆珍), whose father was born near there.

== Subdistricts ==
Name	Chinese (S)	Hanyu Pinyin	Population (2010)	Area (km^{2})
Baiteng Subdistrict	白藤街道	Báiténg Jiēdào	172,732	17.00
Jing'an town	井岸镇	Jǐng'àn Zhèn	172,732	142.00
Baijiao town	白蕉镇	Báijiāo Zhèn	104,568	184.00
Qianwu town	乾务镇	Qiánwù Zhèn	57,352	190.60
Doumen town	斗门镇	Dòumén Zhèn	46,549	105.77
Lianzhou town	莲洲镇	Liánzhōu Zhèn	34,681	88.60

== Climate ==
Climate data for Doumen, elevation 23 m (75 ft), (1991–2020 normals, extremes 1975–present)
Month	Jan	Feb	Mar	Apr	May	Jun	Jul	Aug	Sep	Oct	Nov	Dec	Year
Record high °C (°F)	27.8 (82.0)	28.8 (83.8)	30.5 (86.9)	32.8 (91.0)	34.5 (94.1)	36.8 (98.2)	38.5 (101.3)	37.3 (99.1)	35.7 (96.3)	35.1 (95.2)	32.9 (91.2)	29.1 (84.4)	38.5 (101.3)
Mean daily maximum °C (°F)	18.6 (65.5)	19.6 (67.3)	22.2 (72.0)	26.0 (78.8)	29.4 (84.9)	31.2 (88.2)	32.2 (90.0)	32.2 (90.0)	31.3 (88.3)	28.8 (83.8)	25.0 (77.0)	20.4 (68.7)	26.4 (79.5)
Daily mean °C (°F)	14.9 (58.8)	16.2 (61.2)	18.9 (66.0)	22.9 (73.2)	26.3 (79.3)	28.3 (82.9)	28.9 (84.0)	28.8 (83.8)	27.8 (82.0)	25.2 (77.4)	21.2 (70.2)	16.7 (62.1)	23.0 (73.4)
Mean daily minimum °C (°F)	12.5 (54.5)	14.0 (57.2)	16.8 (62.2)	20.8 (69.4)	24.1 (75.4)	26.0 (78.8)	26.5 (79.7)	26.2 (79.2)	25.3 (77.5)	22.7 (72.9)	18.6 (65.5)	14.1 (57.4)	20.6 (69.1)
Record low °C (°F)	1.9 (35.4)	3.1 (37.6)	2.7 (36.9)	9.4 (48.9)	14.8 (58.6)	18.6 (65.5)	22.1 (71.8)	20.9 (69.6)	17.4 (63.3)	10.7 (51.3)	5.2 (41.4)	1.7 (35.1)	1.7 (35.1)
Average precipitation mm (inches)	38.4 (1.51)	42.3 (1.67)	81.6 (3.21)	195.1 (7.68)	328.9 (12.95)	465.5 (18.33)	347.5 (13.68)	407.5 (16.04)	266.1 (10.48)	77.9 (3.07)	45.5 (1.79)	31.7 (1.25)	2,328 (91.66)
Average precipitation days (≥ 0.1 mm)	6.3	9.6	13.5	13.6	16.5	19.7	17.6	17.7	13.7	6.6	5.2	5.3	145.3
Average relative humidity (%)	74	79	84	85	83	84	81	82	79	72	71	68	79
Mean monthly sunshine hours	116.4	81.0	68.0	87.1	132.7	156.0	207.7	185.5	168.9	177.3	153.5	139.1	1,673.2
Percentage possible sunshine	34	25	18	23	32	39	50	47	46	50	47	42	38
Source: China Meteorological Administrationall-time record lowall-time January lowall-time October high
