= Caprotti =

Caprotti is an Italian surname. Notable people with the surname include:

- Arturo Caprotti (1881–1938), Italian architect and engineer who invented the Caprotti valve gear
- Bernardo Caprotti (1925–2016), Italian billionaire and owner of Esselunga grocery store chain

== See also ==
- Capriotti's, an American restaurant
- Carotti, a surname
