= Giuseppe Caprotti =

Giuseppe Caprotti (born 15 December 1960) is an Italian businessman. A former chief executive of Esselunga, he is president of the Guido Venosta Foundation and vice president of the Società Storica Lombarda.

== Biography ==
Caprotti was born in Milan, the son of Bernardo Caprotti and his first wife, Giorgina Venosta. Bernardo Caprotti co-founded the Esselunga supermarket chain together with Nelson Rockefeller, Guido Caprotti, Marco Brunelli and other Italian shareholders.

He graduated in contemporary history from the Sorbonne University in Paris. In 1986 he joined Esselunga, where he held various positions before serving as chief executive officer from 2002 to 2004.

In 2001 he founded the purchasing group ESD Italia, of which he became chairman, and he remained managing director until 2005. After leaving his roles at Esselunga in 2004, when he was removed by his father, he worked as a consultant for Bain & Company, Messaggerie Italiane and Aspiag (part of the Despar group).

He was a director of SDS, a company active in the horeca (hotels, restaurants and catering) sector and in the sale of artisanal food products. He has also served on the boards of Primafrost (Lombardini Group), the Italian Association for Cancer Research (AIRC) and the Amici della Triennale. From 2021 to 2024 he sat on the board of directors of the publishing group Messaggerie Italiane.

In 2023 he published the book Le ossa dei Caprotti with Feltrinelli.

== Works ==
- Alto Adige o Sudtirol? La questione altoatesina o sudtirolese dal 1945 al 1948 e i suoi sviluppi: studio degli archivi diplomatici francesi, Milan, Franco Angeli, 1990.
- Le ossa dei Caprotti, Milan, Feltrinelli, 2023, ISBN 9788858858394.
