= TBU =

TBU may refer to:

- Vought TBU Sea Wolf, a U.S. World War II torpedo bomber
- Fuaʻamotu International Airport (IATA airport code) in Tonga
- Telephone balance unit, device to convert unbalanced to balanced audio signals
- Tirana Business University a university in Albania
- Tokushima Bunri University, in Tokushima, Japan
- Tomas Bata University in Zlín, Czech Republic
