= Mariotti (surname) =

Mariotti is an Italian surname. Notable people with the surname include:

- Alberto Mariotti (born 1935), Argentinean association football player
- Alessandro Mariotti (born 1998), San Marinese alpine skier
- Carlo Speridone Mariotti (1726–1790), Italian painter
- Charlie Mariotti (born 1958), Dominican politician, manager, and broadcaster
- Filippo Mariotti (1833–1911), Italian politician and lawyer
- Francesco Mariotti (1943–2026), Swiss artist and cultural activist
- Frédéric Mariotti (1883–1971), French stage and film actor
- Giuseppe Mariotti (born 1963), Italian classical pianist
- Jay Mariotti (born 1959), American sports commentator and writer
- John Mariotti (born 1984), American baseball pitcher
- Luigi Mariotti (1912–2004), Italian politician
- Maria Mariotti (born 1964), Italian association football player
- Massimo Mariotti (born 1961), retired Swiss footballer
- Michele Mariotti (born 1979), Italian conductor
- Paolo Mariotti (born 1979), Sammarinese association football player
- Renato Mariotti, American attorney and legal commentator
- Sergio Mariotti (born 1946), Italian chess player
- Steve Mariotti (born 1953), American social entrepreneur and educator

== See also ==
- Marotti
