= Mariotti =

Mariotti may refer to

- Mariotti (surname)
- The Mariotti Show, a web radio show launched by Jay Mariotti
- 7972 Mariotti, a minor planet
- Stadio Mariotti in Italy
