= Esselunga =

Italian retail chain

- Type: Società per azioni
- Industry: Retail
- Founded: 1957
- Headquarters: Limito di Pioltello (MI), Italy
- Number of locations: 160 points of sale
- Area served: Emilia Romagna; Lazio; Liguria; Lombardy; Piedmont; Tuscany; Veneto
- Key people: Bernardo Caprotti (founder)
- Products: Food and consumer goods
- Revenue: ▲€ 7.75 billion (2017)
- Number of employees: 23,094 (2017)
- Website: www.esselunga.it

Esselunga S.p.A. is an Italian retail store chain. Founded in 1957 by Nelson Rockefeller, Bernardo, Guido and Claudio Caprotti, Marco Brunelli, the Crespi family and other Italian associates, the company is now entirely owned by the Caprotti family through Supermarkets Italiani S.p.A. The store's name literally means "long S". Esselunga stores are located in the regions of Lombardy, Tuscany, Piedmont, Veneto, Liguria, Emilia Romagna and Lazio, with a large majority (over 100) located in Lombardy, specifically in and around Milan. Many of the larger stores also host coffee bars, named "Bar Atlantic".

== History ==
As of 2023, the company had over 25,000 employees and an €8.8 billion turnover. Esselunga controls about 8.3% of the Italian grocery distribution market, according to figures from 2021. It is ranked as the fourth most profitable company in the Italian supermarket sector. Until 1999, Esselunga owned a share of the Italian branch of Penny Market (a REWE group company).

It was the first supermarket chain in Italy to introduce on-line shopping and self-produced organic products.

Esselunga was entirely owned by Bernardo Caprotti until his death in 2016. In his will, Caprotti left 66.7% of Esselunga to his second wife Giuliana Albera and their daughter Marina Sylvia, and 16.7% to each of his children from his first marriage, his son Giuseppe Caprotti and his daughter Violetta.

Many of the stores owned by the chain were designed by famous architects such as Ignazio Gardella, Vico Magistretti, Luigi Caccia Dominioni and Mario Botta.

== Sources ==
- Marino, Vivian (2007-09-23). "Italian grocery chain Esselunga not for sale after all". International Herald Tribune. Archived from the original on 2007-10-21.
