= Carotti =

Carotti is an Italian surname. Notable people with the surname include:

- Bruno Carotti (born 1972), French footballer and sporting director
- Gabriello Carotti (born 1960), Italian footballer
- Lorenzo Carotti (born 1985), Italian footballer

== See also ==
- Marotti
