= Diaolou =

Type of Chinese watchtower

Kaiping Diaolou and Villages
UNESCO World Heritage Site
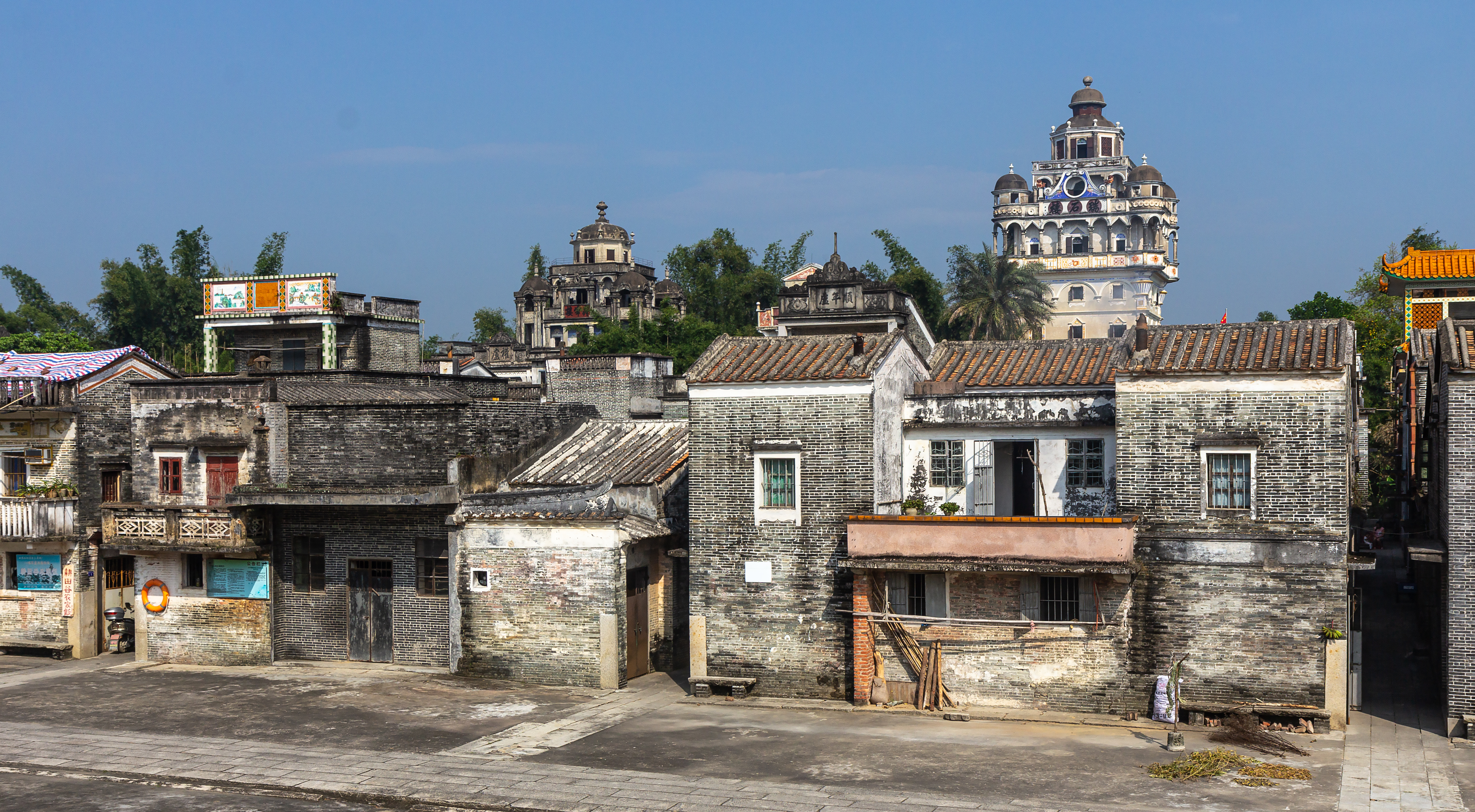
- Jinjiangli village, with Ruishi Diaolou (瑞石樓) in the back

- Location within Guangdong Location within China
- Location: Kaiping, Guangdong, China
- Includes: 1. Yinglong Lou (at Sanmenli Village); 2. Zili Village and the Fang Clan Watch Tower; 3. Majianlong Village Cluster; 4. Jingjiangli Village
- Criteria: Cultural: (ii), (iii), (iv)
- Reference: 1112
- Inscription: 2007 (31st Session)
- Area: 372 ha (920 acres)
- Buffer zone: 2,738 ha (6,770 acres)
- Coordinates: 22°17′8″N 112°33′57″E

Diaolou
- Traditional Chinese: 碉樓
- Simplified Chinese: 碉楼
- Literal meaning: watchtower
Transcriptions
Standard Mandarin
- Hanyu Pinyin: diāolóu
Yue: Cantonese
- Jyutping: diu^{1} lau^{4}

Diaolou (simplified Chinese: 碉楼; traditional Chinese: 碉樓) are fortified multi-storey watchtowers in rural villages, generally made of reinforced concrete. These towers are located mainly in Kaiping, Guangdong province, China. In 2007, UNESCO designated the Kaiping Diaolou and Villages (开平碉楼与村落) a World Heritage Site, which covers four separate Kaiping village areas: Sanmenli (三门里), Zilicun (自力村), Jinjiangli (锦江里), and Majianglong village cluster (马降龙村落群). These areas demonstrate a unique fusion of 19th- and 20th-century Chinese and Western architectural styles.

== History ==
Diaolou structures were built from the time of the Ming dynasty to the early 20th century, reaching a peak during the Warlord Era in the 1920s and 1930s, with the financial aid of overseas Chinese, when there were more than three thousand of these structures. Today, approximately 1,800 diaolou remain standing, and mostly abandoned, in the village countryside of Kaiping. They can also occasionally be found in several other areas of Guangdong, such as Shenzhen and Dongguan.

The earliest standing diaolou in Kaiping is Yinglong Lou (迎龙楼) in the village of Sanmenli (Chikan township), built by the Guan lineage during the reign of the Jiajing Emperor of the Ming dynasty (1522–1566). It was a massive three-storey rectangular fortress with one-meter thick walls, with little resemblance with the high tower diaolous built four centuries later. Yinglong Lou was renovated in 1919 and is 11.4 meters high.

In the late 19th century and early 20th century, because of poverty and social instabilities, Kaiping was a region of major emigration abroad, one of the "pre-eminent sending area" of overseas Chinese. Diaolous built during the chaotic early 20th century were most numerous around the centers of emigration. Monies from emigrants wanting to ensure the security of their families, villages, or clan lineages were used to fund the diaolou. Although the diaolous were built mainly as protection against forays by bandits, many of them also served as living quarters. Some of them were built by a single family, some by several families together or by entire village communities. Kaiping became also a melting pot of ideas and trends brought back by overseas Chinese. As a result, the villagers built their diaolou to incorporate architectural features from China and from the West.

It was not until after 1949 when an administrative system that extended down to the small villages was created that the diaolou lost their defensive purpose and were then abandoned or converted. Still, they stand as a tribute to overseas Chinese culture and the perseverance of the peasants of Kaiping.

In 2007, UNESCO named the Kaiping Diaolou and Villages (开平碉楼与村落) a World Heritage Site. UNESCO wrote, "...the Diaolou ... display a complex and flamboyant fusion of Chinese and Western structural and decorative forms. They reflect the significant role of émigré Kaiping people in the development of several countries in South Asia, Australasia, and North America, during the late 19th and early 20th centuries, and the close links between overseas Kaiping and their ancestral homes. The property inscribed here consists of four groups of Diaolou, totaling some 1,800 tower houses in their village settings." The four restored groups of Kaiping diaolou are in: Zilicun village (自力村) of Tangkou township (塘口镇), Sanmenli village (三门里) of Chikan township (赤坎镇), Majianglong cluster (马降龙) of Baihe township (百合镇), and Jinjiangli village (锦江里) of Xiangang township (蚬冈镇).

The Kaiping diaolou was the location for parts of the filming of 2010 movie Let the Bullets Fly (让子弹飞).

== Examples ==
Yinglong Lou (迎龙楼), located in the village of Sanmenli (Chikan township), was built by the Guan (关族) lineage during the Jiajing era of the Ming dynasty (1522–1566). As the oldest preserved diaolou in Kaiping, it retains the primitive model of a watchtower with traditional square structure and is not influenced by western architectural styles.

Jinjiangli Diaolou Cluster (锦江里碉楼群), situated behind Jinjiangli Village (Xiangang Township) of the Huang (黄) family, includes three exquisite diaolous: Ruishi Lou, Shengfeng Lou, and Jinjiang Lou. Ruishi Diaolou, constructed in 1921, has nine floors and is the tallest diaolou in Kaiping. It features a Byzantine style roof and a Roman dome.

Majianglong Diaolou cluster (马降龙碉楼群) is spread across five villages (Baihe township) in a bamboo forest: Yong'an and Nan'an Villages of the Huang (黄) family; Hedong, Qinglin, and Longjiang Villages of the Guan (关) family. Tianlu Lou (Tower of Heavenly Success), located in Yong'an Village, was built in 1922 and is seven storeys tall plus a rooftop floor.

Zilicun Diaolou Cluster (自力村碉楼群), located in Zilicun Village (Tangkou township), includes nine diaolous, the largest number among the four Kaiping villages designated by UNESCO. They feature the fusion of Chinese and various Western architectural styles and rise up surrealistically over the rice paddy fields.

Fangshi Denglou (Fang Clan Watch Tower) – Built in 1920 after contributions from villagers, this denglou is five stories high. It is referred to as the "Light Tower" because of an enormous searchlight with a brightness much like that of a lighthouse.

Li Garden, in Beiyi Xiang, was constructed in 1936 by Mr. Jay W. Rapp (谢维立), a Chinese emigrant to the United States.

Bianchouzhu Lou (The Leaning Tower), located in Nanxing Village (南兴村) in Xiangang township, was constructed in 1903. It has seven floors and overlooks a pond.

== Gallery ==
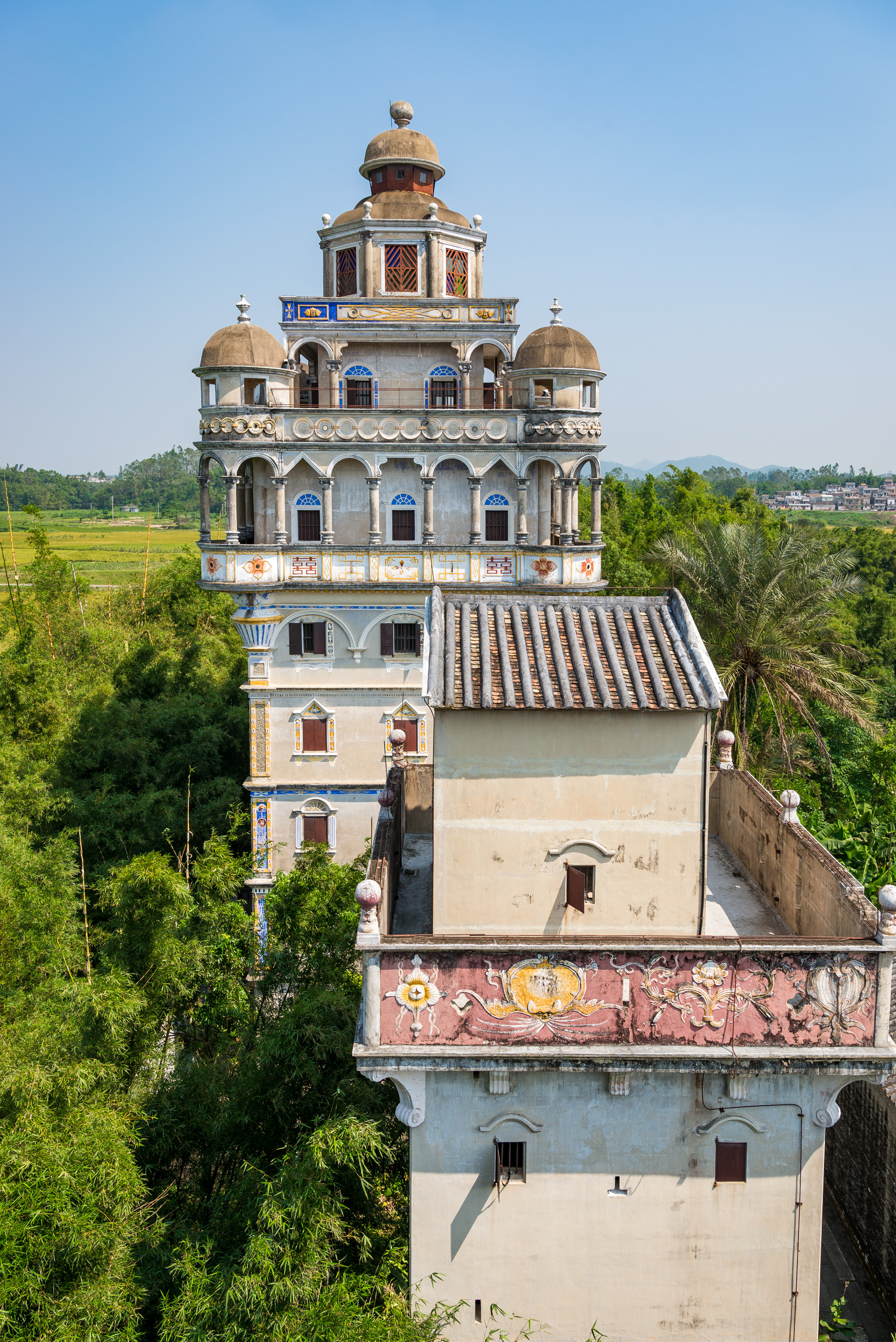
Ruishi Lou (瑞石樓; behind) and Jinjiang Lou (錦江樓, front) the two Diaolou's of Jinjiangli Village (錦江里村)

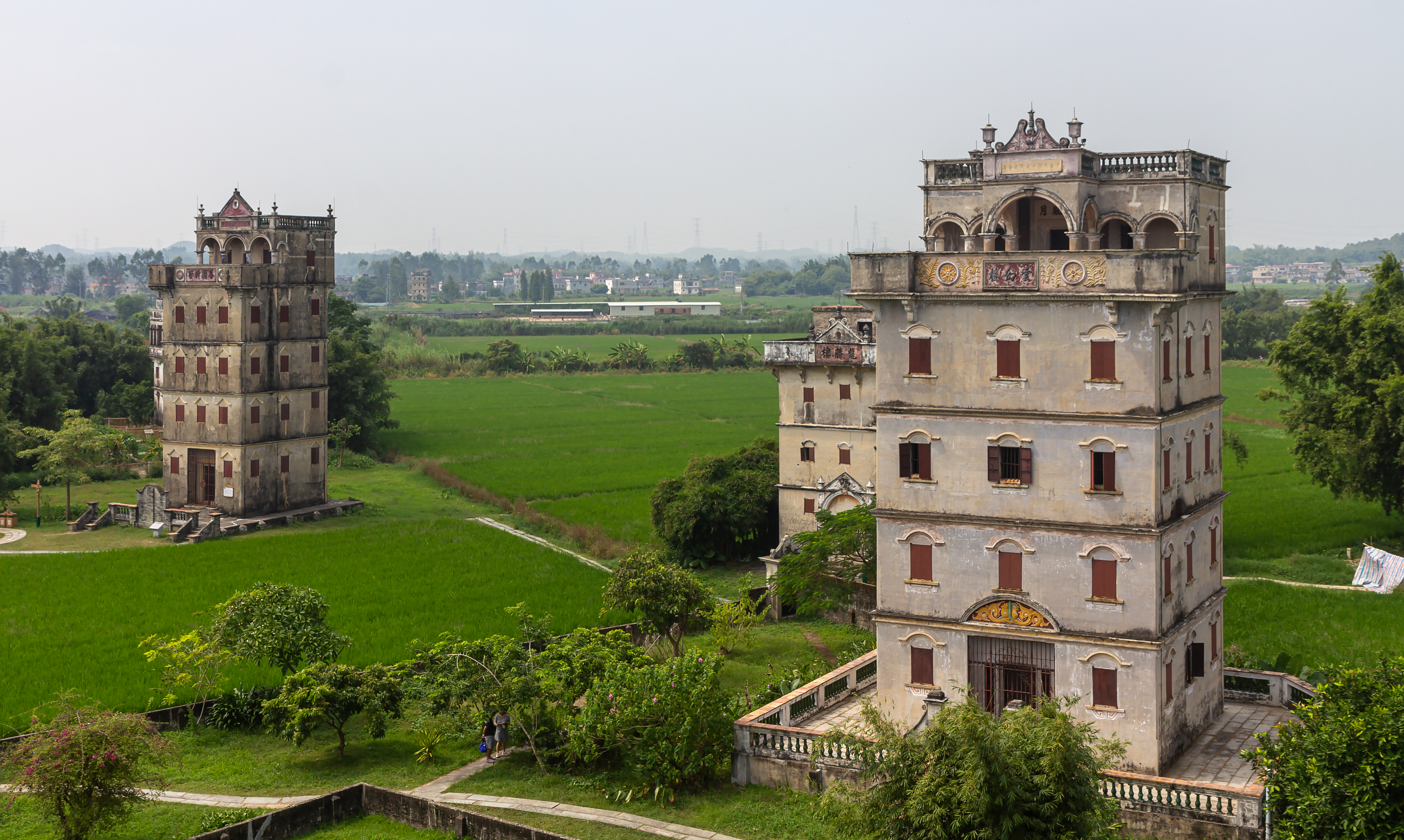
Diaolou cluster in Zilicun

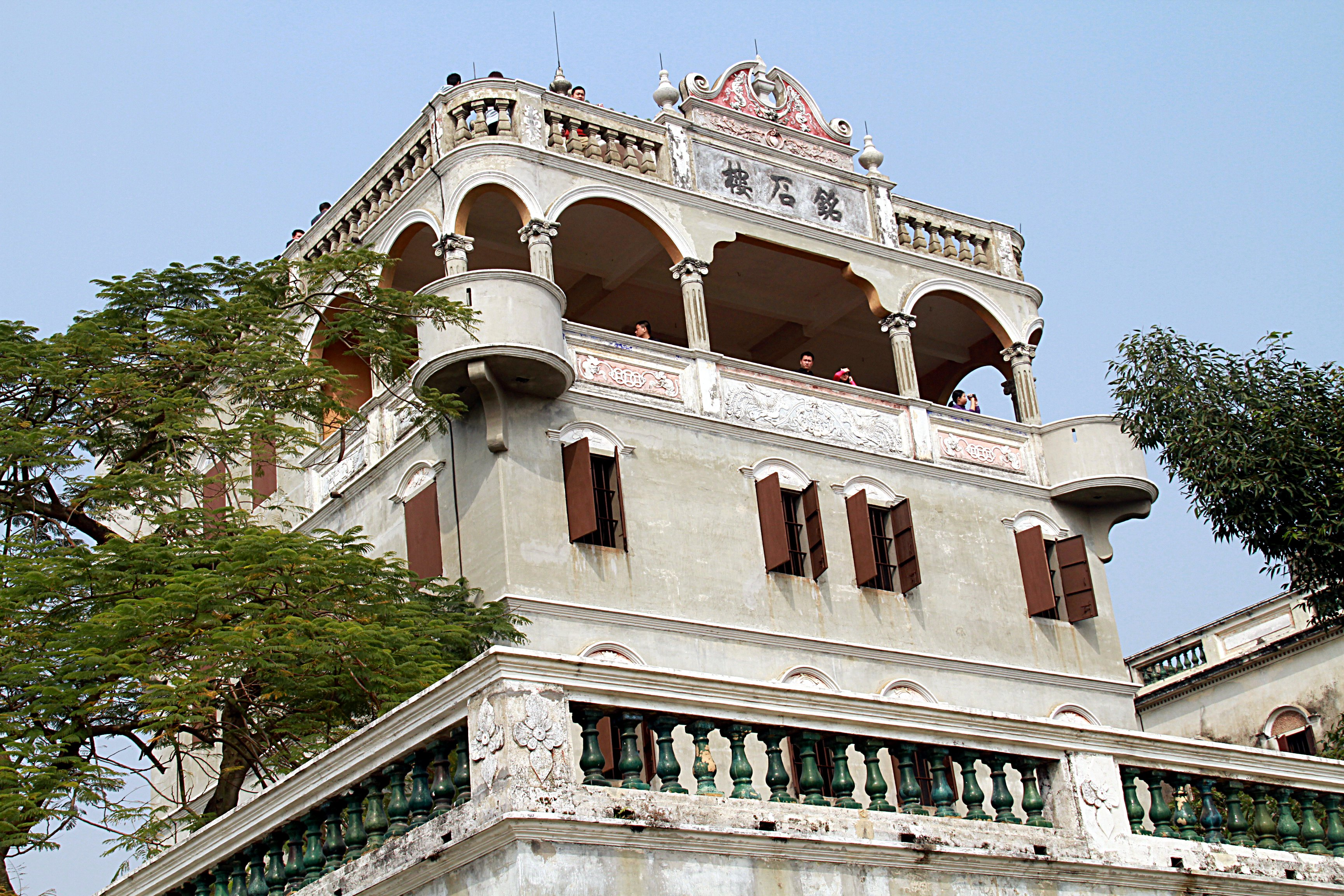
Kaiping diaolou in Zilicun

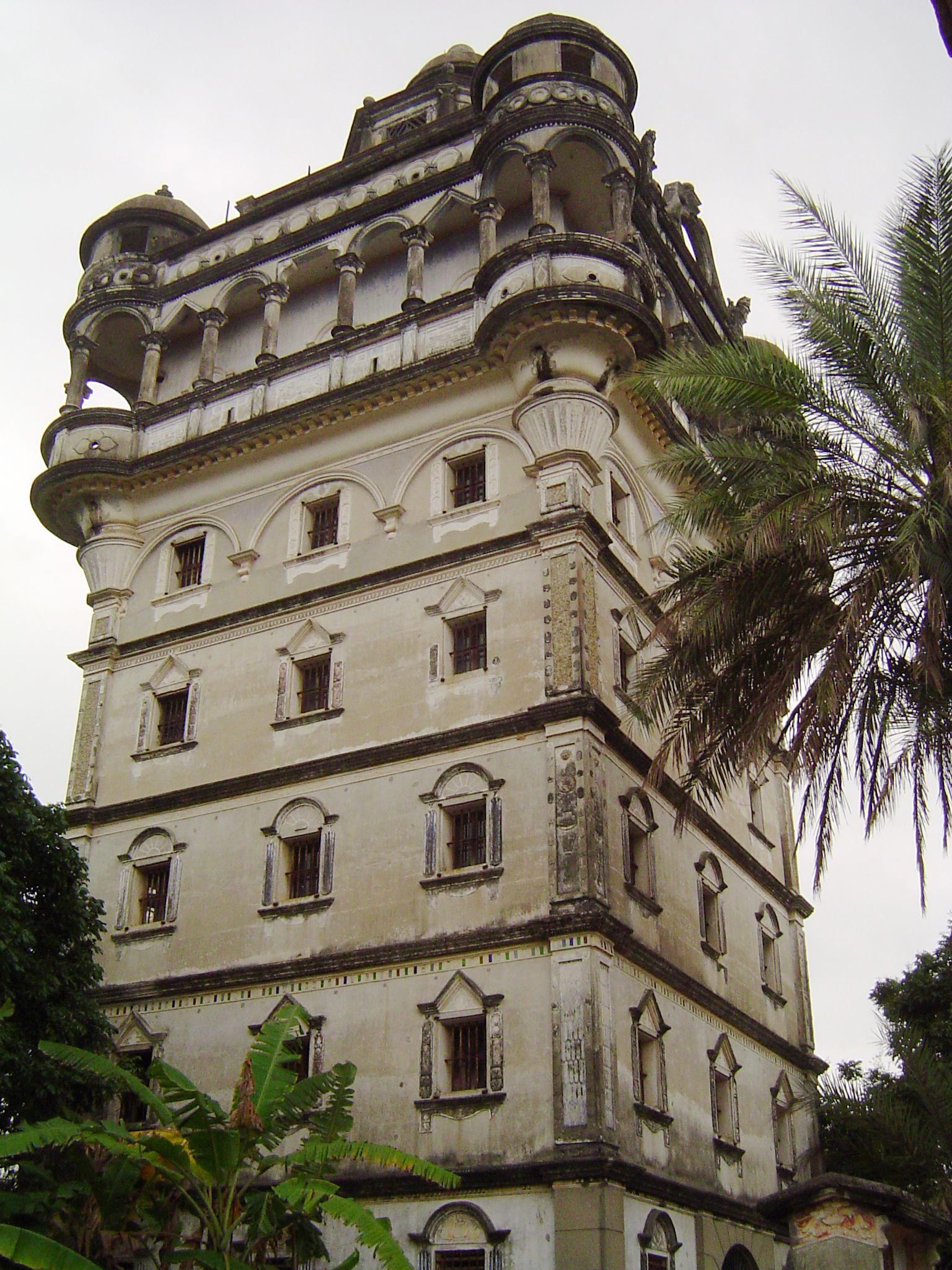
Ruishi Lou in Jinjiangli

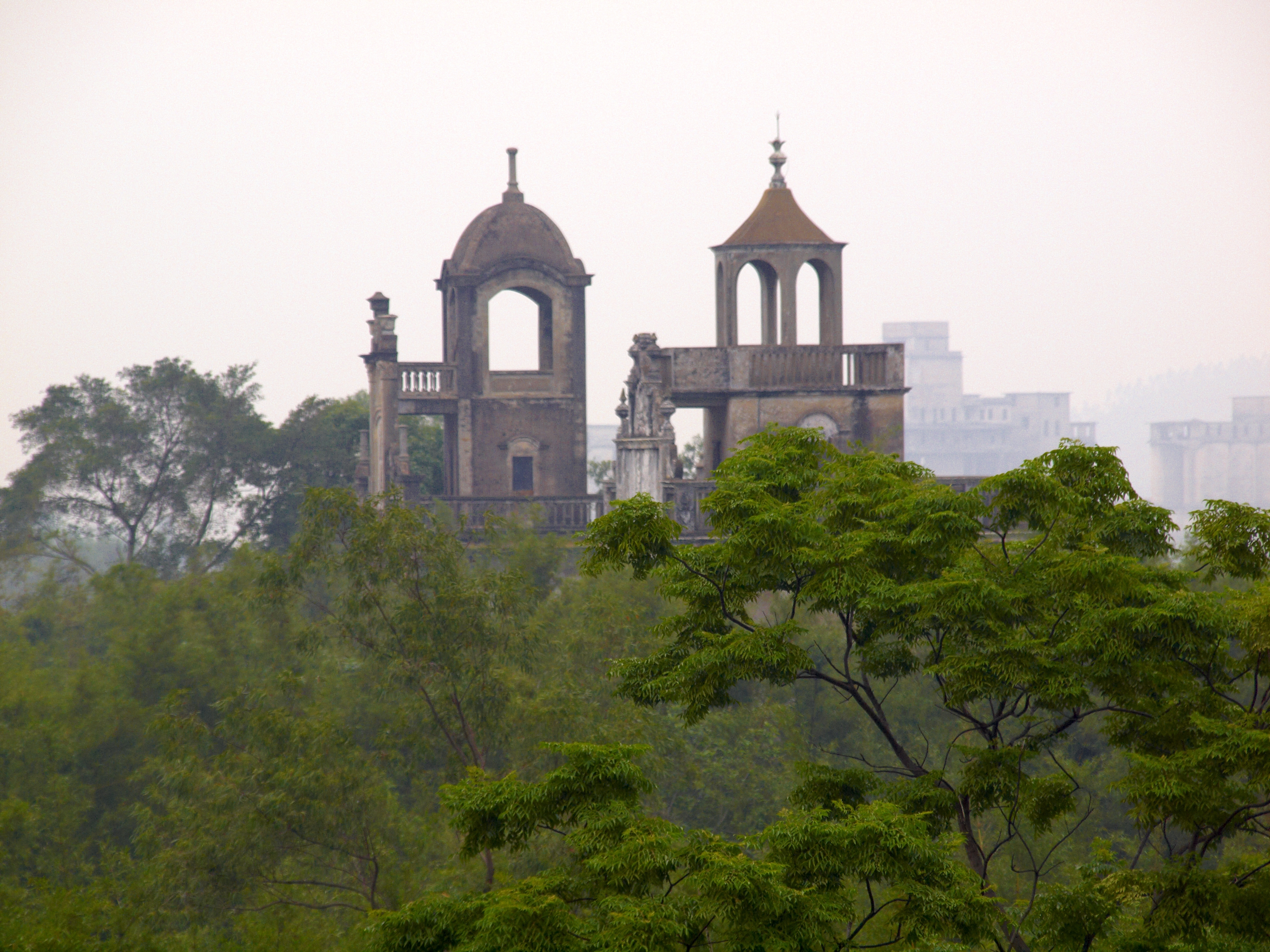
Majianglong Diaolou

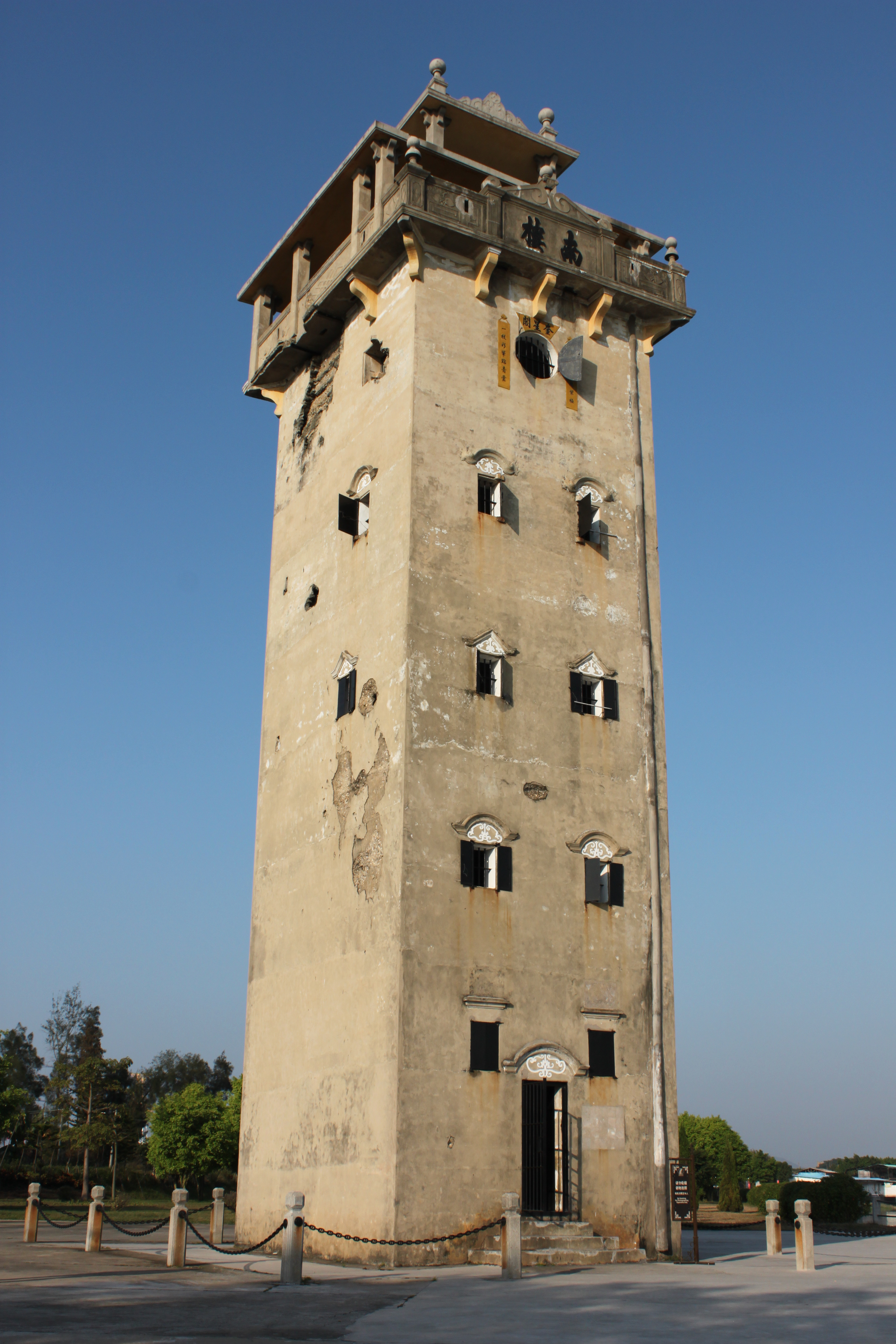
Nan Lou in Chikan

== See also ==
- Cantonese architecture
- Chikan, Kaiping
- Kaiping
- Himalayan Towers
