= Chikan, Kaiping =

Historic town in Guangdong, China

Chikan 赤坎
- Town
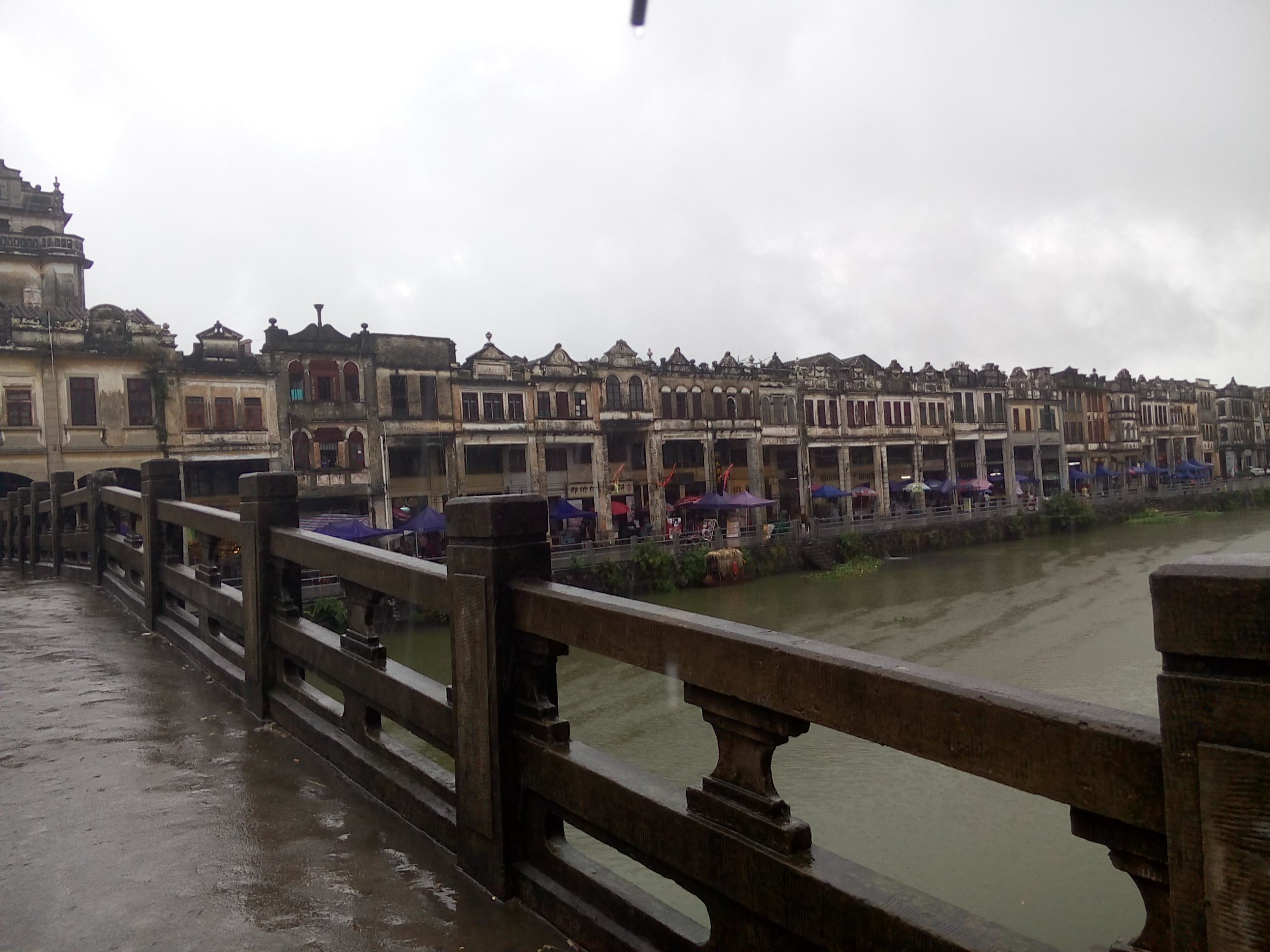
- Chikan Dixi Lu riverfront with Qilous dating from the early 20th century
- Etymology: Red Coloured Soil
- Interactive map of Chikan
- Coordinates: 22°19′24″N 112°35′01″E
- Country: China
- Province: Guangdong
- Prefecture: Jiangmen
- County: Kaiping

Area
  - Town: 61.4 km^{2} (23.7 sq mi)
  - Urban: 5 km^{2} (1.9 sq mi)

Population (2013)
  - Town: 46,000
  - Density: 750/km^{2} (1,900/sq mi)

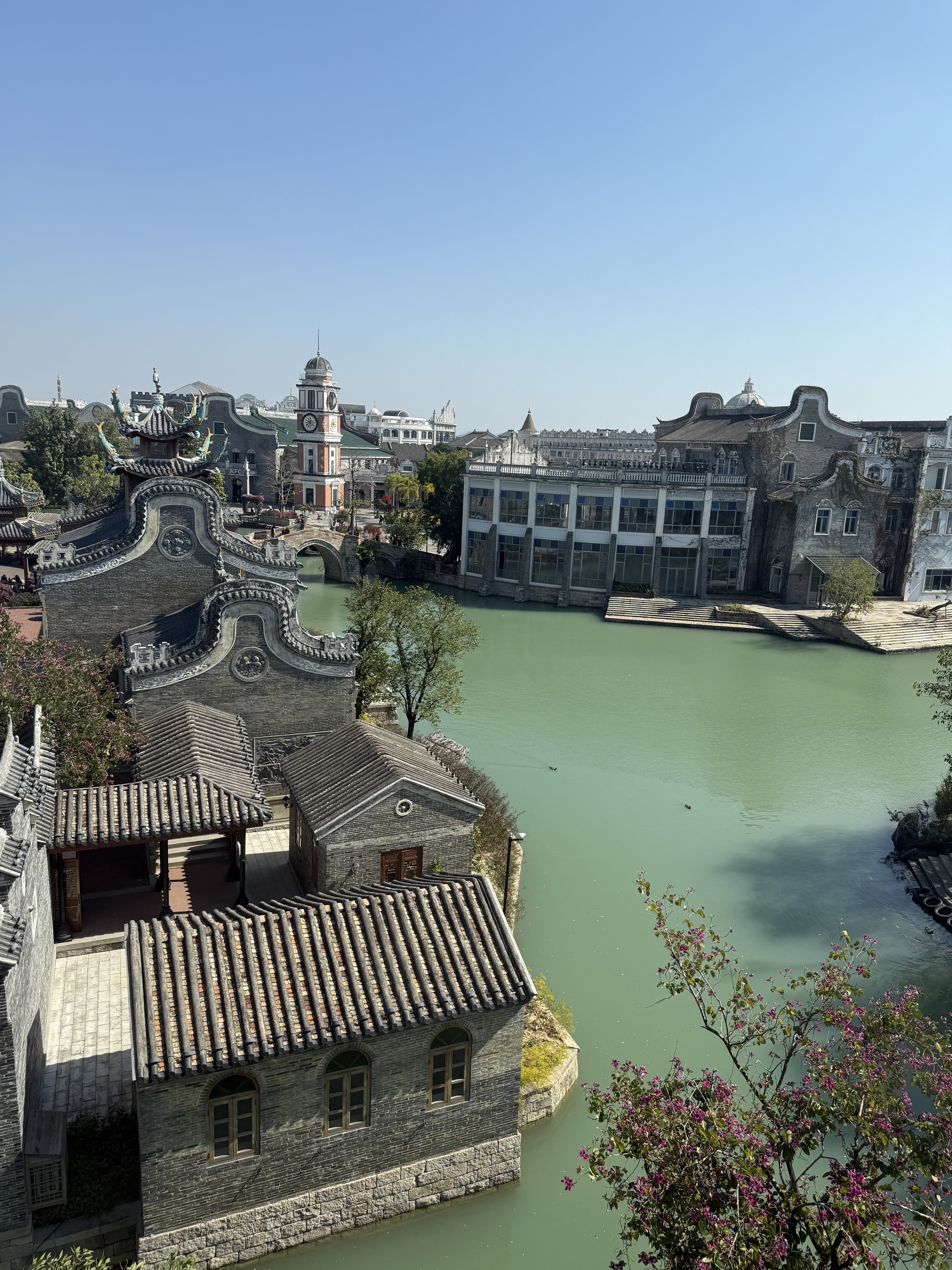

Chikan (Chinese: 赤坎; pinyin: Chìkǎn; Jyutping: cek3 ham2, Taishanese: cok4 ham1) is a town in Kaiping (開平), Jiangmen, Guangdong Province, China. It is officially designated as a National Historic and Cultural Town of China (中国历史文化名镇). Historically it was a regional maritime hub, center for emigration, emigrant market town, and the administrative centre of Kaiping.

== History ==
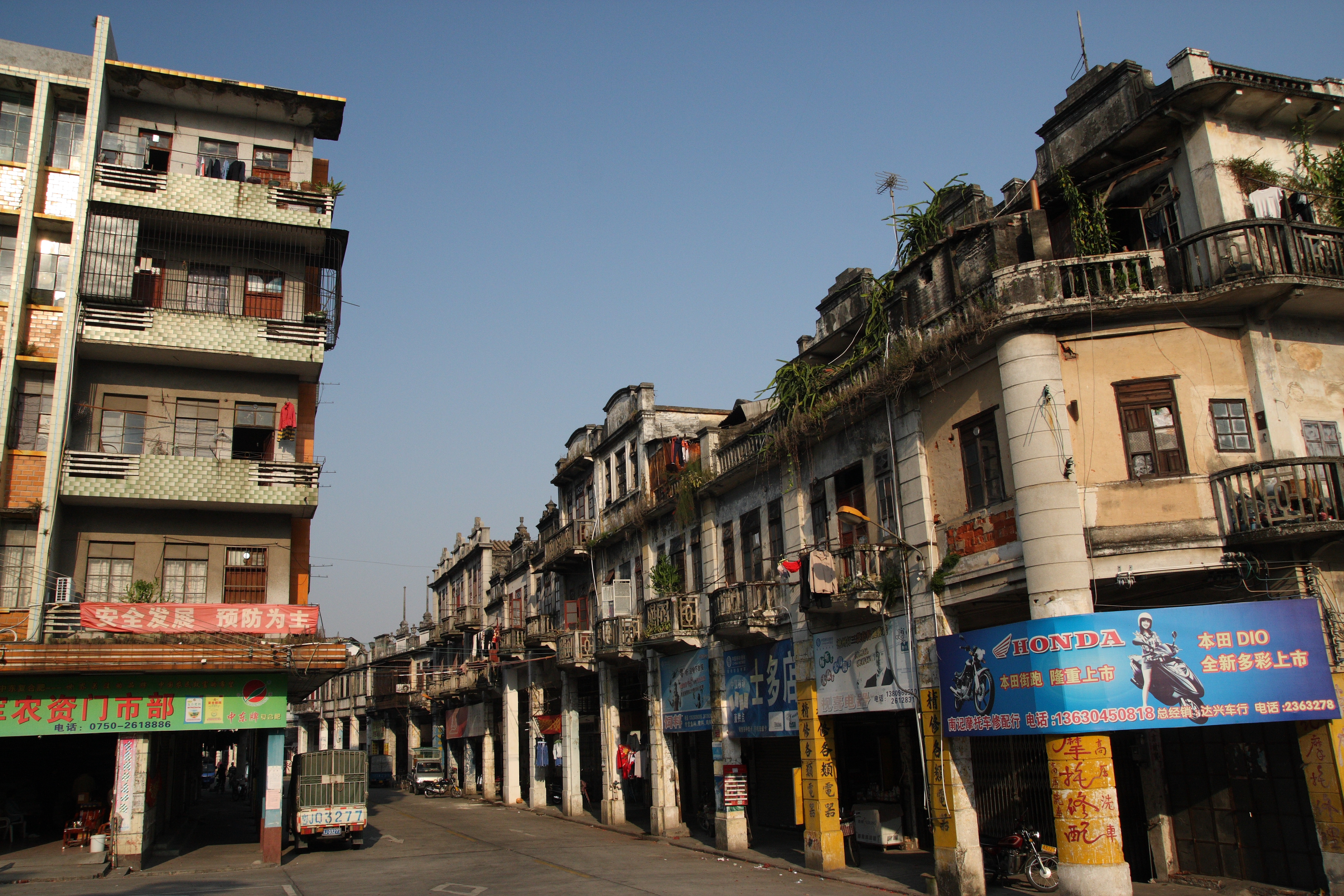
A street in Chikan

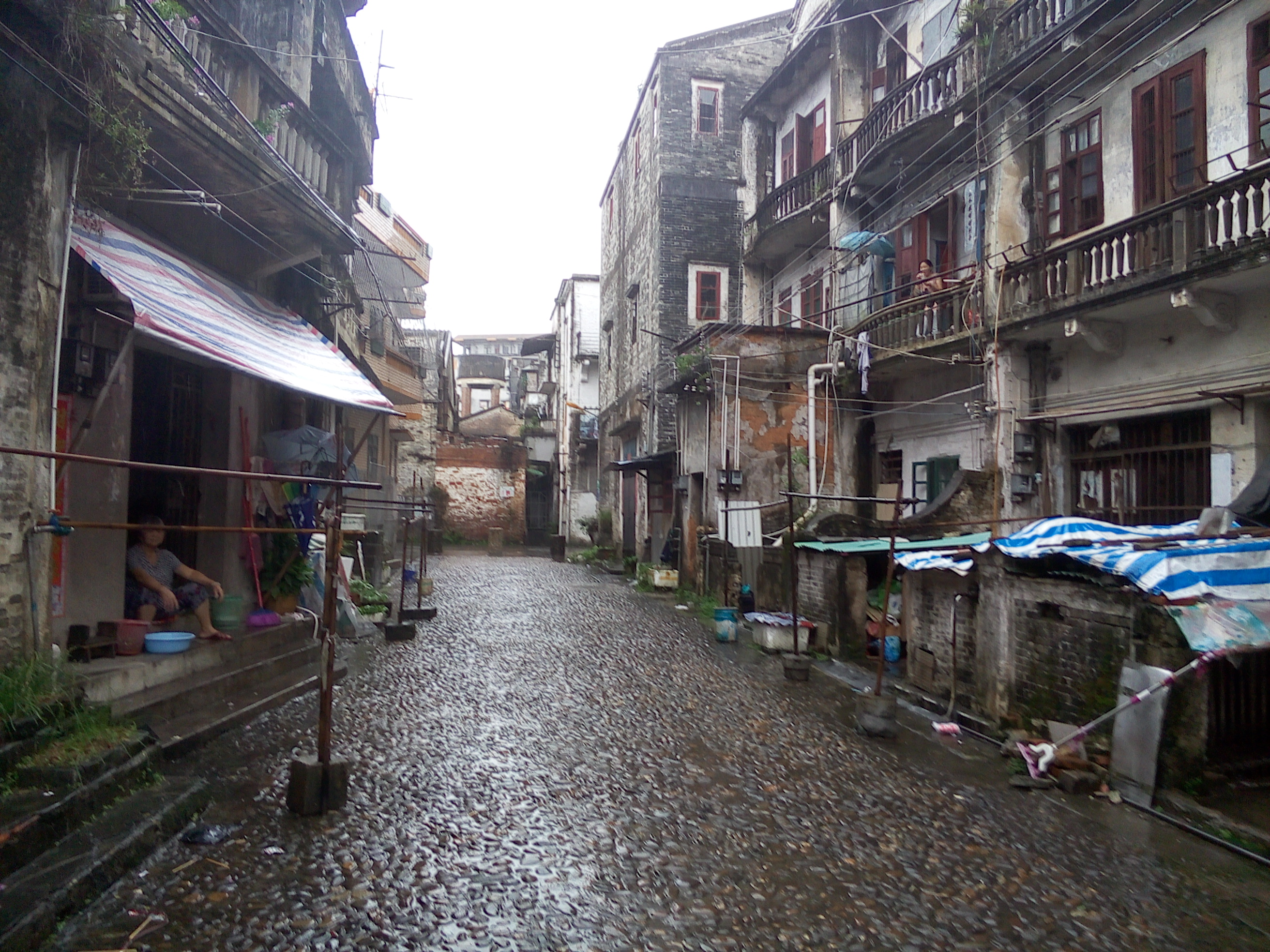
Er Malu (二马路)

Chikan town was founded in the year 1649 and was originally part of Xinhui County. Due to it being surrounded by the Tan River on all sides, it thrived in waterway transport. According to the 1991 town chronicle, a pier was present by the year 1676. In the late 19th and early 20th centuries, Chikan became the major regional maritime transportation hub in Kaiping county and, through its numerous ferries via the Tan river (潭江) to Jiangmen, in the Pearl River Delta. This came to an end upon the silting of the Tan River in the 20th century.

As a riverport, Chikan became a center for emigration from the Tan river catchment area in the late 19th century, pushed by increasing population pressure, rural poverty and civil disorder, and pulled by opportunities elsewhere and overseas. In the early 20th century, Chikan grew rapidly from a rural market for nearby villages of two competing clans, the Guan (关族) and the Situ (司徒族), to an emigrant market town for all comers. In 1907 the Chikan Chamber of Commerce was founded jointly by a Guan and a Situ. The rapid growth of Chikan was fueled by (a) local merchants prospering from trade along the Tan, (b) emigrants investing in the local shops, in modern roads to supplant the Tan River trade route, and in new local schools, and (c) young locals graduating from modern schools. In addition to investing, emigrants started to return when civil order began to improve. Thus, by the 1930s, Chikan became one of the largest market towns in South China with about 1,000 shops, the vast majority of them operated by emigrants or their families.

== Geography ==
Chikan is located on the Tan River (潭江) near the geographical center of Kaiping, about 12 kilometres southwest of Kaiping city center. Chikan is located between the Li Garden (立园) and the Majianglong diaolous (马降龙雕楼群). Main roads that run through the town include Dixi Lu (堤西路) (sometimes referred to as 'European Styled Street') and Didong Lu (堤东路) on either sides of the Tan river, Er Malu (二马路) and Zhonghua Lu (中华路). There are 19 villages within Chikan as of 2013.

== Historical sites ==
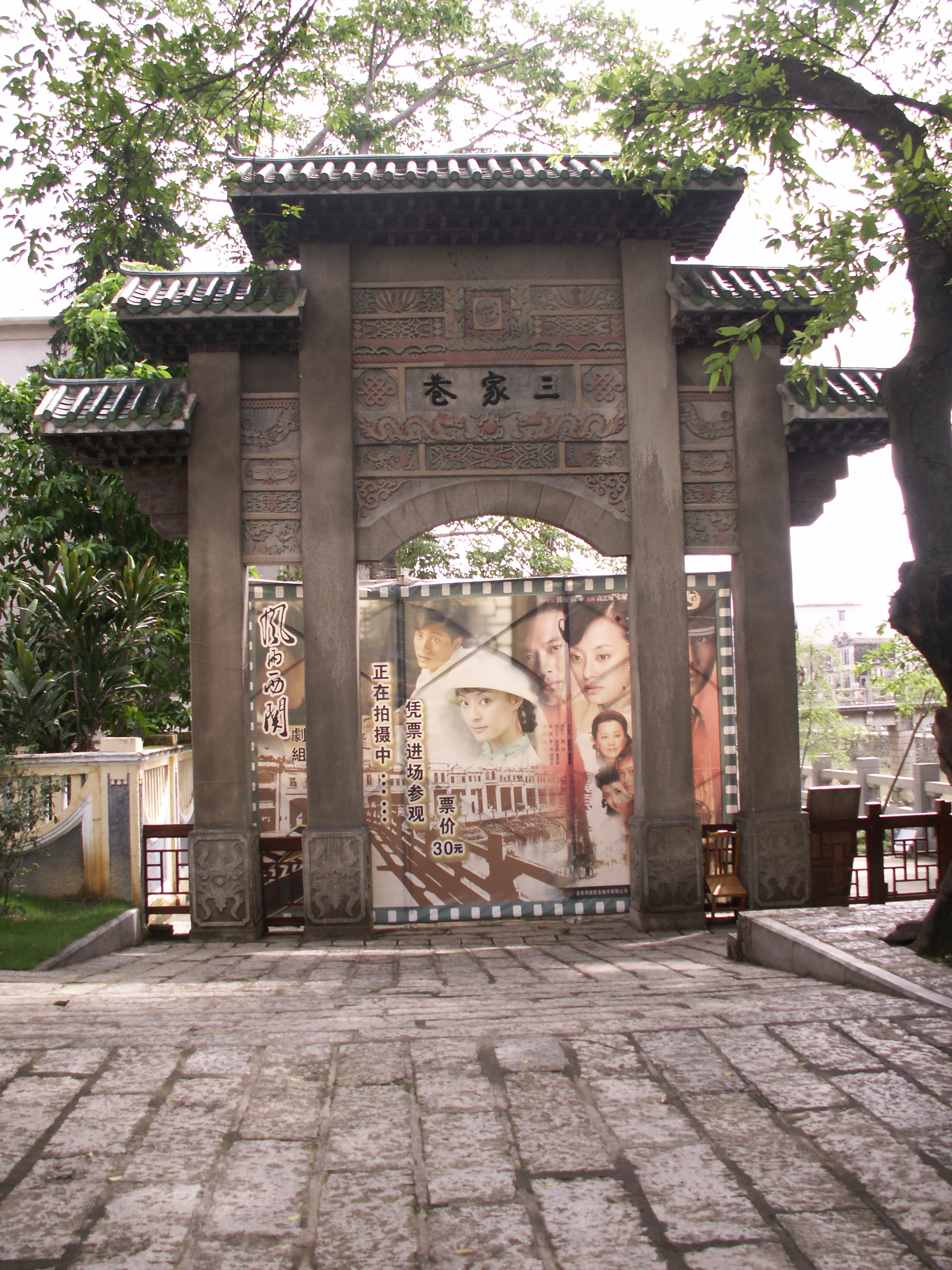
Chikan Movie & Video City

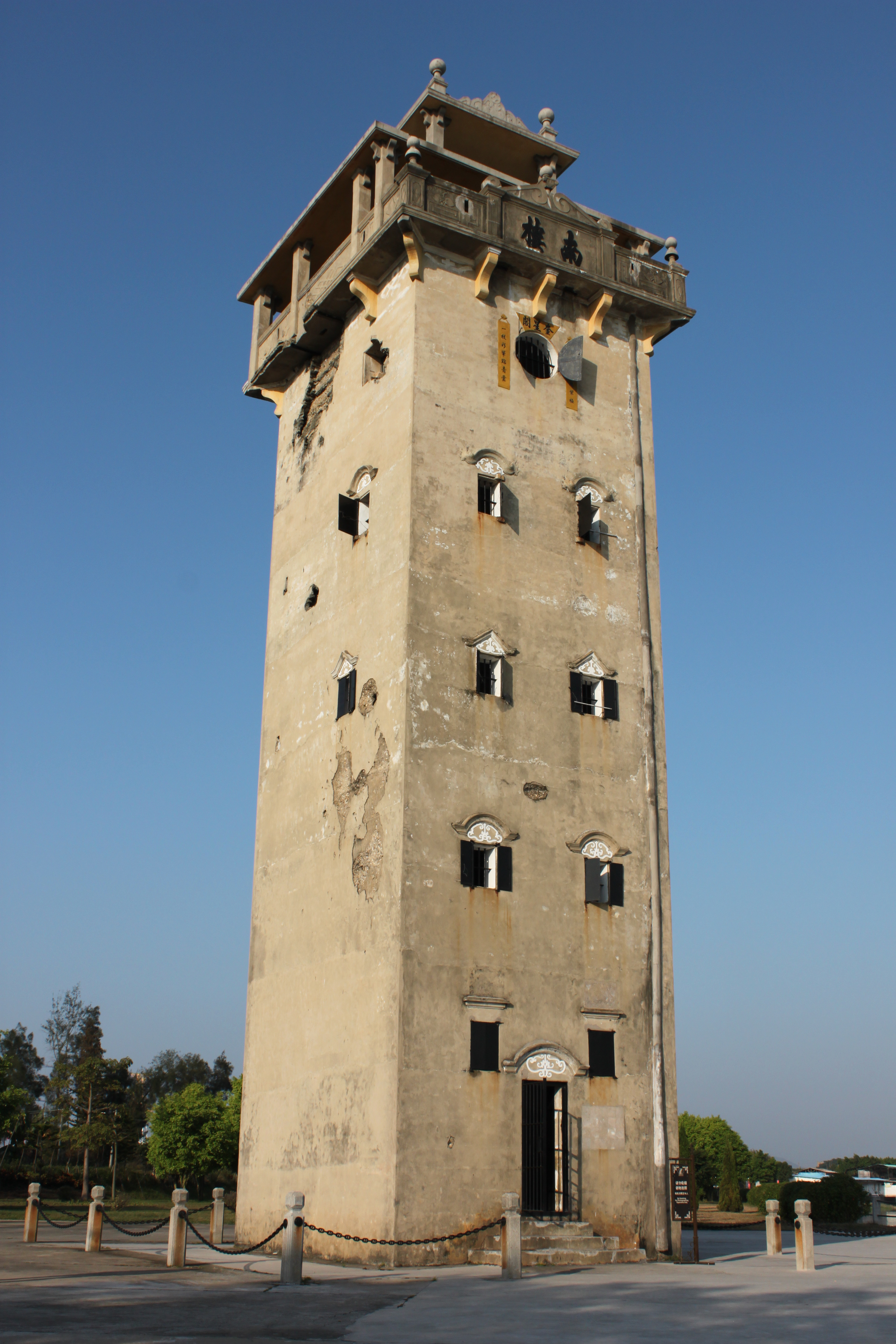
Nan Lou (南樓)

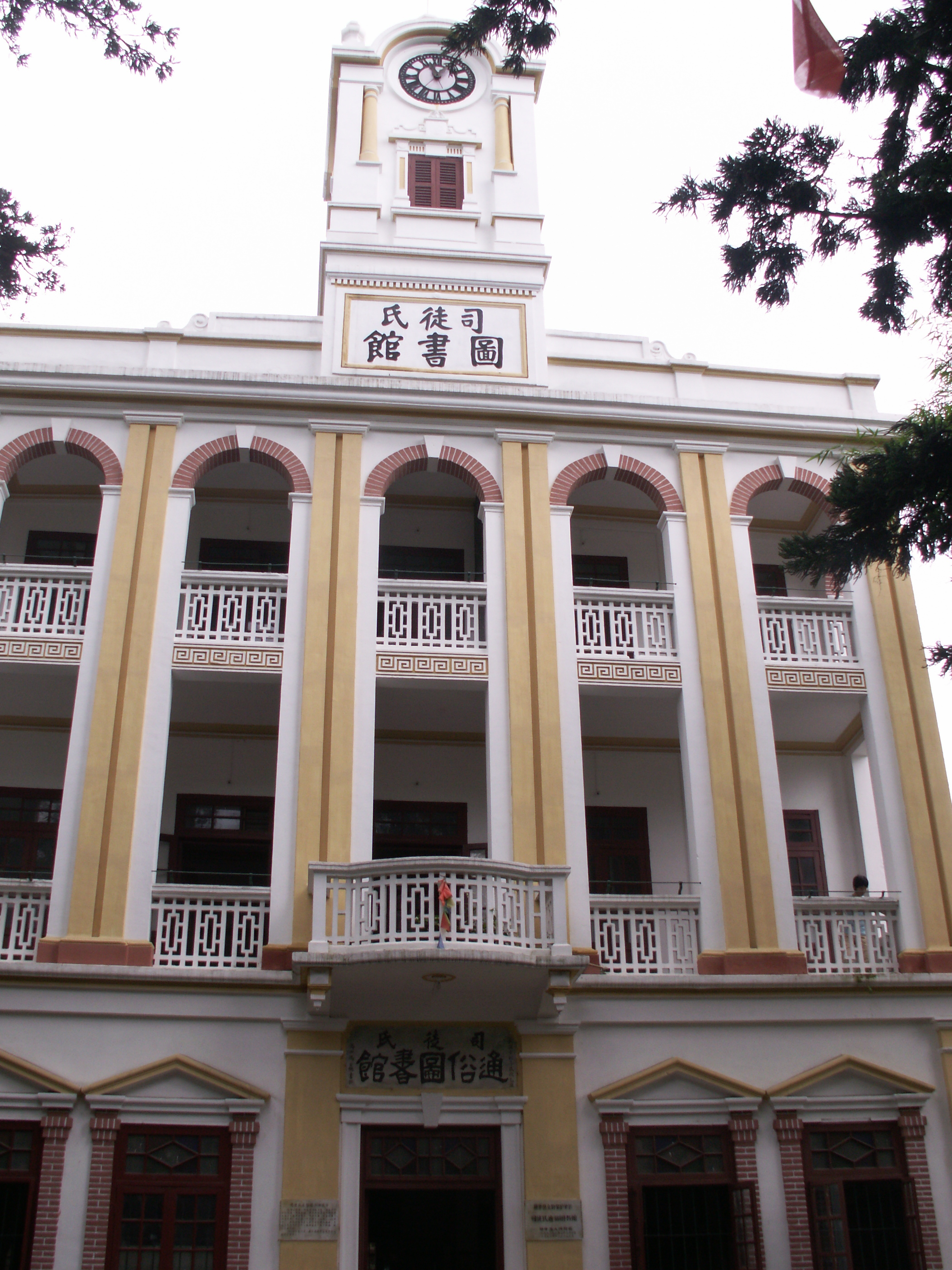
Situ's Library, first opened 1926

=== Qilou (Tong lau) and Movie City ===
There are over 600 late-Qing and early-Republic historic Tong laus or Qilous (唐樓/ 騎樓) spanning over a length of 3 kilometers in the old town of Chikan. In the late 19th and early 20th century, Chikan was a regional market town, a center for emigration abroad, and a melting pot of ideas and trends brought back by overseas Chinese, "Huaqiao" (華僑). As a consequence, many qilou built during that period in Chikan incorporated architectural features from China and the West and were examples of the Qiaoxiang (僑鄉) architecture.

As a result of the concentration of historical buildings in Chikan, part of the old town was made into Chikan Studio City (赤坎影视城) in 2005, for filming of historical scenes. Movies least partially filmed in Chikan Studio City include The Grandmaster and Drunken Master II.

==== Jinghui Lou ====
Jinghui Lou (Chinese: 景辉楼; Jyutping: ging2 fai1 lau4) is a Qilou on Dixi Road and was the former residence of Zhang Jinghui, a noted clinic in the early 20th century. Now converted into a museum.

=== Diaolou ===
There are about 200 diaolous still standing in Chikan township, most built during the early 20th century chaos, and most abandoned and in need of restoration. The oldest extant diaolou in Kaiping is found in northeast Chikan township, and one restored diaolou is located right in Chikan town.

==== Nan Lou ====
Nan Lou (南楼) is a defensive diaolou in Chikan. Seven Situ Clan (司徒族) members fought against Japanese invasion into Chikan atop Nan Lou for 7 consecutive days. They were only captured and killed after the invading Japanese fired poison gas. A monument (南楼七烈士就义纪念碑) was built on the Tanjiang riverside in their memory.

==== Yinglong Lou ====
Yinglong Lou (迎龙楼, literally, greeting the dragon tower), one of the earliest Diaolou in Kaiping, was built by the Guan clan (关族) during Jiajing years of the Ming dynasty (1522-1566) in the village of Sanmenli (三门里) in northeast Chikan township. Unlike the thousands of high tower diaolous constructed later in the 20th century, Yinglong Lou is a massive three-storey rectangular fortress with one-meter thick walls and is not influenced by western architectural styles. It was rebuilt in 1919 with grey bricks and new roof, and it stands 11.4 meters high. In 2007 it was included in the "Kaiping Diaolou & Villages", which was collectively designated a UNESCO World Heritage Site.

==== Canada Village ====
Canada Village (加拿大村) was originally known as Yaohua Fang (耀华坊), when the "new" village, located south of Sanmenli (三门里), was established in 1923 by overseas Chinese returned from Canada. The ten houses and one five-storey diaolou watch tower were built integrating foreign and local architectures. Since many of its villagers now reside in Canada, it has become colloquially known as Canada Village. In 2007 it was included in the "Kaiping Diaolou & Villages", which was collectively designated a UNESCO World Heritage Site.

=== Two Clans, Two Libraries, and Two Waves of Overseas Support ===
Chikan town was originally largely ran by two clans, the Situ (司徒族) and the Guan (关族), who resided in the lower and upper reaches, respectively, of the Tan River. Historically the two were under constant rivalry and competition. In 1923 the Situ clan built their own, though public, "Situ's Library", which opened in 1926, costing more than 30,000 silver dollars. To save their reputation, the Guan clan built their own "Guan's Library", which opened in 1931, at a similar scale to Situ's. Both libraries were funded by overseas Chinese in the 1920s and incorporated architecture features including large clocks from overseas.

With the ascent of the People's Republic of China in 1949, the influence of the two clans began to wane. By 1958 both the Situ and Guan libraries were converted to government offices, and after 1968, both were abandoned. In 1978 major reforms in economic, cultural, and overseas Chinese policies were adopted to promote rural modernization, which led to a partial revival of the clan institutions. With the perseverance of the Kaiping clan members, at the approval of the government, and upon a massive wave of support and donations from overseas Chinese in the 1980s, the two lineage libraries were re-opened.

== Renovation of Chikan Old Town ==
In April 2017, the government announced a plan to renovate the historic (1920-1930s) but aging Chikan Old Town. The plan is projected to cost 6 billion yuan ($875 million), cover almost 4,000 historic homes, and require several years to complete. As Chikan's population has mostly emigrated, with twice as many abroad than in town, a hope is that development would relieve rural poverty and attract overseas Chinese to return.
