= Betty Kwan Chinn =

Chinese-American philanthropist

- 關惠群
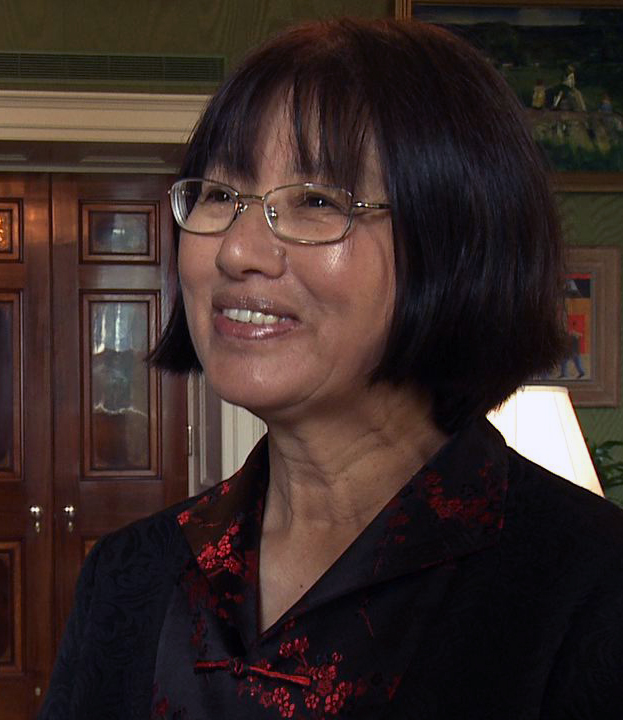
- Betty Kwan Chinn
- Born: 1959 (age 66–67); Hoiping, China
- Known for: Presidential Citizens Medal. Philanthropy
- Spouse: Leung Chinn
- Children: Two sons
- Website: www.bettychinn.org

Betty Kwan Chinn (關惠群) is a Chinese-American philanthropist who lives in Eureka, California. She has helped the homeless, including the mentally ill, disabled veterans, families fleeing domestic violence, runaways, and drug abusers, since the 1980s. She won the 2008 Minerva Award. She used the $25,000 grant as seed money and worked with the Society of Saint Vincent de Paul to establish the homeless a bathroom and kitchen. U.S. President Barack Obama awarded her and 12 others the Presidential Citizens Medal on August 4, 2010, at the White House.

== Early life ==
Betty Kwan Chinn was born to a wealthy family in Hoiping (Kaiping), Guangdong. Hoiping (Kaiping) is well-known as a hometown of overseas Chinese. She was possibly born in 1959 (as her birth certificate was lost, this can no longer be confirmed). She was labeled as a member of the "Five Black Categories" during the Chinese Cultural Revolution. She witnessed her elder brother and sister-in-law being executed by gunfire. At the age of seven, she became a homeless child, scavenging for food in garbage piles. Later, she smuggled herself into Hong Kong and eventually immigrated to the United States. Although her time in Hong Kong was brief, she was deeply inspired by seeing the Cantonese opera star Sun Ma Sze Tsang come out every year to do charity work and raise funds for Tung Wah Group of Hospitals.

At the age of 14, she arrived in San Francisco, USA, to stay with relatives. Later, she moved to Seattle to join her sister, who had married and settled there. After her sister left for work every day, she would stay home and watch children's programs on PBS, such as Sesame Street and Mr. Rogers' Neighborhood. These shows became her classroom. "I never went to school; I always stayed at home. Then I found my best friends on Sesame Street, and they taught me English," said . This was how she learned English.

== Philanthropy ==
The Betty Kwan Chinn Day Center opened November 16, 2013 offering a variety of services for the poor and homeless.

In 2020, the Betty Kwan Chinn Foundation stopped receiving donation items due to the coronavirus pandemic. The foundation offered 100 free packed meals on weekdays at its Eureka-based center.

In 2023, Kwan Chinn was named by Carnegie Corporation of New York as an honoree of the Great Immigrants Awards.
