= Kaiping =

County-level city in Guangdong, China

Kaiping 开平市 Hoiping
- County-level city
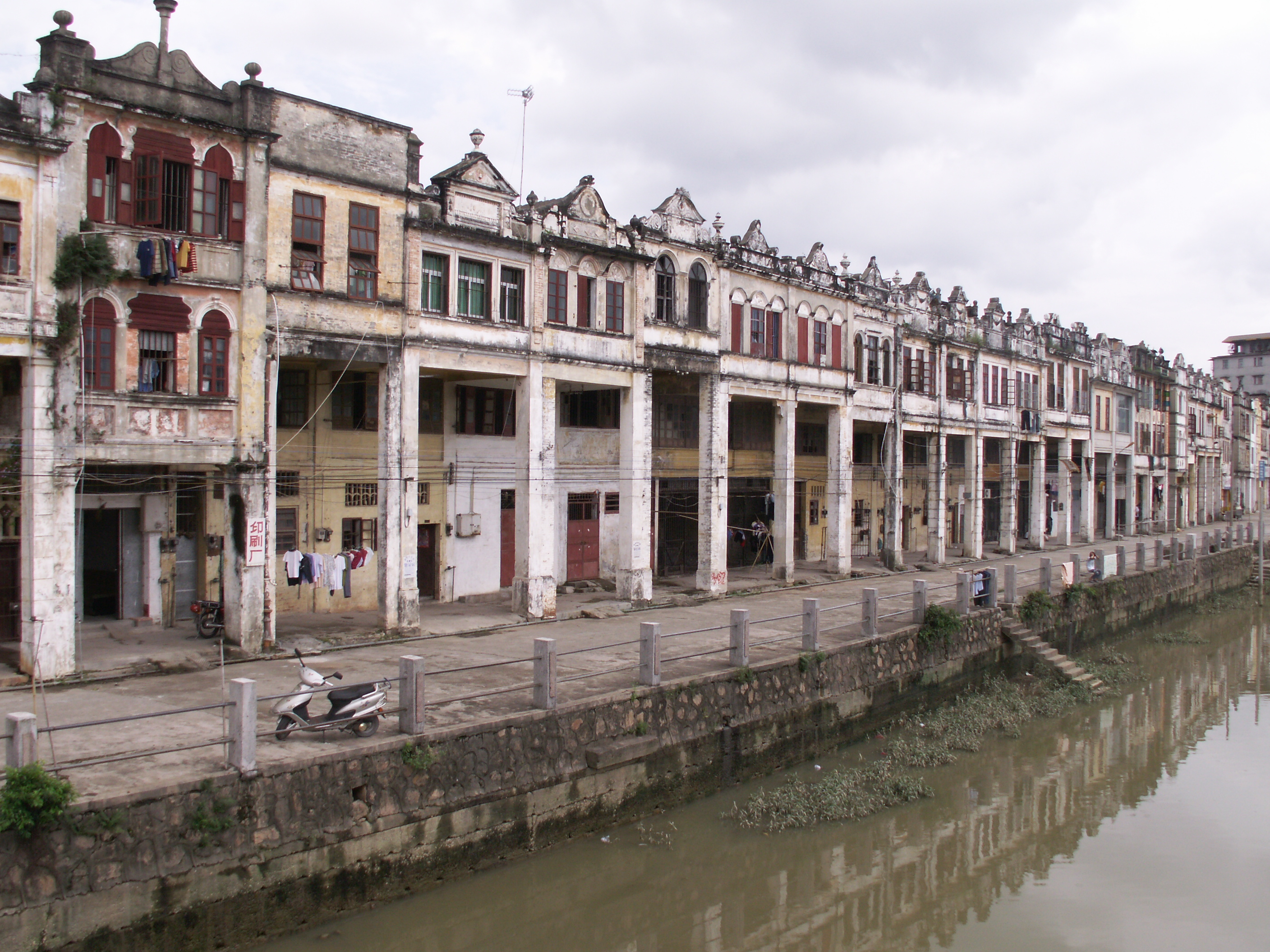
- Dixi Road in Chikan, Kaiping

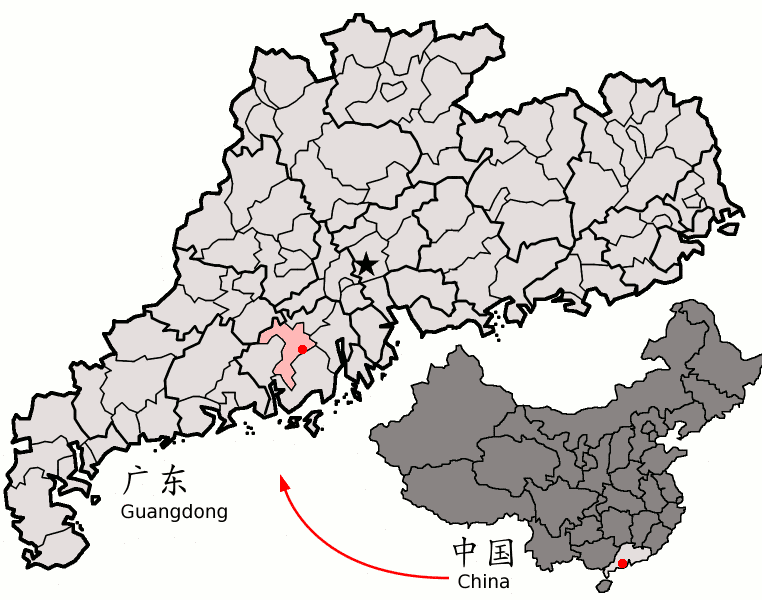
- Location of Kaiping City Centre (red) in Kaiping (pink), Guangdong province, and the PRC

- Location of the Kaiping city centre in Guangdong
- Coordinates: 22°22′38″N 112°41′54″E
- Country: People's Republic of China
- Province: Guangdong
- Prefecture-level city: Jiangmen
- County seat: Changsha Subdistrict (长沙街道)

Area
  - Total: 1,659 km^{2} (641 sq mi)

Population (2020 census)
  - Total: 748,777
  - Density: 451.3/km^{2} (1,169/sq mi)
- Time zone: UTC+8 (China Standard)
- Postal code: 529300
- Area code: 0750
- Website: www.kaiping.gov.cn

Kaiping
- Simplified Chinese: 开平
- Traditional Chinese: 開平
- Taishanese: Hoi3-pen6 (local)
- Hanyu Pinyin: Kāipíng
- Postal: Hoiping
Transcriptions
Standard Mandarin
- Hanyu Pinyin: Kāipíng
- Wade–Giles: K'ai^{1}-p'ing^{2}
- IPA: [kʰáɪpʰǐŋ]
Yue: Cantonese
- Jyutping: Hoi^{1}-ping^{4}
- IPA: [hɔj˥ pʰɪŋ˩]
other Yue
- Taishanese: Hoi3-pen6 (local)

Kaiping (simplified Chinese: 开平; traditional Chinese: 開平), alternately romanized in Cantonese as Hoiping, (Note: The Postal Map romanization is based on the local Cantonese pronunciation. Other romanizations include Kae Ping.) in local dialect as Hoihen, is a county-level city in Guangdong Province, China. It is located in the western section of the Pearl River Delta and administered as part of the prefecture-level city of Jiangmen. The surrounding area, especially Sze Yup (四邑), are often venerated with the title "qiaoxiang" (侨乡), for they are the ancestral homelands of many overseas Chinese, particularly in the United States. Kaiping has a population of 748,777 as of 2020 and an area of 1,659 square kilometres (641 sq mi). The locals speak a variant of the Sze Yup dialect.

== History ==
During the Northern Song dynasty (960–1127), Kaiping was under the administration of Xin'an county (信安縣) Under the Qing (1649), Hoiping County made up part of the commandery of Shiuhing (Zhaoqing). From 1649 to 1949, the administration centre of Kaiping was Cangcheng (蒼城鎮). From 1950 to 1953, the administration center moved to Chikan (赤磡鎮). Since 1953, the administration center is Sanbu (三埠鎮). It was promoted to county-level city status in 1993.

== Administration ==
Administratively, Kaiping is administered as part of the prefecture-level city of Jiangmen.

Name	Chinese (S)	Hanyu Pinyin	Population (2010)
Sanbu Subdistrict	三埠街道	Sānbù Jiēdào	173,100
Changsha	长沙街道	Chángshā Jiēdào	124,829
Shatang	沙塘镇	Shātáng Zhèn	24,667
Chacheng	苍城镇	Cāngchéng Zhèn	26,750
Longsheng	龙胜镇	Lóngshèng Zhèn	26,161
Dasha	大沙镇	Dàshā Zhèn	22,298
Magang	马冈镇	Mǎgāng Zhèn	30,728
Tangkou	塘口镇	Tángkǒu Zhèn	22,626
Chikan	赤坎镇	Chìkǎn Zhèn	37,260
Baihe	百合镇	Bǎihé Zhèn	17,621
Xiangang	蚬冈镇	Xiǎngāng Zhèn	13,280
Jinji	金鸡镇	Jīnjī Zhèn	16,493
Yueshan	月山镇	Yuèshān Zhèn	46,700
Chishui	赤水镇	Chìshuǐ Zhèn	25,894
Shuikou	水口镇	Shuǐkǒu Zhèn	90,835

== Geography ==
Kaiping's city centre is located on the Tanjiang River, 140 kilometres (87 mi) away from Guangzhou, on the edge of the county Kaiping west of the Pearl River Delta. Kaiping consists of broken terrain, mostly either rocky or swampy, with only a third of the land arable. The county is shaped like a giant question mark (see map, in pink) and includes rural areas as well as three port cities: Changsha, Xinchang, and Dihai.

== Climate ==
Climate data for Kaiping, elevation 29 m (95 ft), (1991–2020 normals, extremes 1969–2010)
Month	Jan	Feb	Mar	Apr	May	Jun	Jul	Aug	Sep	Oct	Nov	Dec	Year
Record high °C (°F)	28.5 (83.3)	29.3 (84.7)	31.7 (89.1)	33.8 (92.8)	35.2 (95.4)	38.0 (100.4)	39.4 (102.9)	37.8 (100.0)	36.0 (96.8)	35.8 (96.4)	33.3 (91.9)	29.3 (84.7)	39.4 (102.9)
Mean daily maximum °C (°F)	18.8 (65.8)	20.3 (68.5)	22.7 (72.9)	26.7 (80.1)	30.2 (86.4)	31.9 (89.4)	32.9 (91.2)	32.8 (91.0)	31.6 (88.9)	28.9 (84.0)	25.1 (77.2)	20.6 (69.1)	26.9 (80.4)
Daily mean °C (°F)	14.7 (58.5)	16.2 (61.2)	19.0 (66.2)	23.1 (73.6)	26.4 (79.5)	28.2 (82.8)	28.8 (83.8)	28.6 (83.5)	27.6 (81.7)	24.9 (76.8)	20.9 (69.6)	16.3 (61.3)	22.9 (73.2)
Mean daily minimum °C (°F)	11.7 (53.1)	13.4 (56.1)	16.4 (61.5)	20.5 (68.9)	23.8 (74.8)	25.6 (78.1)	26.1 (79.0)	25.9 (78.6)	24.8 (76.6)	21.9 (71.4)	17.7 (63.9)	13.1 (55.6)	20.1 (68.1)
Record low °C (°F)	3.3 (37.9)	1.0 (33.8)	6.9 (44.4)	9.3 (48.7)	17.3 (63.1)	18.3 (64.9)	22.6 (72.7)	22.2 (72.0)	16.9 (62.4)	14.3 (57.7)	8.9 (48.0)	2.5 (36.5)	1.0 (33.8)
Average precipitation mm (inches)	46.6 (1.83)	47.5 (1.87)	73.9 (2.91)	183.7 (7.23)	265.3 (10.44)	323.5 (12.74)	273.0 (10.75)	299.2 (11.78)	197.0 (7.76)	63.2 (2.49)	37.7 (1.48)	36.7 (1.44)	1,847.3 (72.72)
Average precipitation days (≥ 0.1 mm)	7.2	9.0	12.7	13.8	16.6	19.4	17.4	17.6	12.8	5.9	5.2	5.2	142.8
Average relative humidity (%)	73	78	82	83	82	83	81	82	78	71	69	67	77
Mean monthly sunshine hours	111.8	84.9	70.7	92.2	137.6	160.1	201.0	184.3	170.2	177.4	156.1	139.8	1,686.1
Percentage possible sunshine	33	26	19	24	34	40	49	46	47	50	47	42	38
Source: China Meteorological Administrationall-time record low

== Notable people ==
- Wing-tsit Chan: Chinese American scholar
- Ed Chau: member of the California State Assembly
- George Chow: member of the Legislative Assembly of British Columbia
- Yun Gee: Chinese American artist
- Víctor Joy Way: Chinese Peruvian politician
- Betty Kwan Chinn: Chinese American philanthropist
- Lee Quo-wei (利國偉) (1918–2013): former Hong Kong banker
- Liang Xiang (梁湘): former Governor of Hainan province
- Betty Ong: American flight attendant aboard American Airlines Flight 11
- Jean Quan: former mayor of Oakland, California
- Bing Thom: Chinese Canadian architect and urban designer
- Szeto Wah (司徒華) (1931–2011): Hong Kong politician
- Delbert E. Wong: Los Angeles County jurist who was the first judge in the continental United States of Chinese descent
- Ken Hom: Chinese-American chef, BBC TV presenter, and author
- Jessica Soho, Filipino news anchor, correspondent and TV host of Kapuso Mo, Jessica Soho who traces her paternal grandfather's ancestral roots at Hoiping County, Guangdong, China

== Sights ==
=== Kaiping Diaolou ===
Kaiping Diaolous (碉楼) are fortified multi-storey towers constructed in the village countryside of mainly the Kaiping area. They were built from the early Qing dynasty to the early 20th century, reaching a peak in the 1920s and 1930s, with the financial aid of overseas Chinese, when there were more than three thousand of these structures. Today, 1,833 diaolou are still standing, with the most in the towns of Shuikou (水口镇), Tangkou (塘口镇), Baihe (百合镇), Chikan (赤坎镇), and Xiangang (蚬冈镇), in that order (see map in article by Batto).

In the late 19th and early 20th century, Kaiping was a region of major emigration abroad, and a melting pot of ideas and trends brought back by overseas Chinese, Huaqiao, made good. As a consequence, many watchtowers incorporated architectural features from China and the West. These were examples of the Qiaoxiang (僑鄉) architecture. The diaolou were built by villagers during a time of chaos and served two purposes: housing and protecting against forays by bandits.

In 2007, the Kaiping diaolou and villages were added to the list of UNESCO World Heritage Sites and consist of four separate restored village areas: Zilicun village (自力村) in Tangkou, Sanmenli village (三门里) in Chikan, Jinjiangli village (锦江里) in Xiangang, and Majianglong village cluster (马降龙村落群) in Baihe township.

The Kaiping diaolou was the location for parts of the filming of 2010 movie Let the Bullets Fly (让子弹飞).

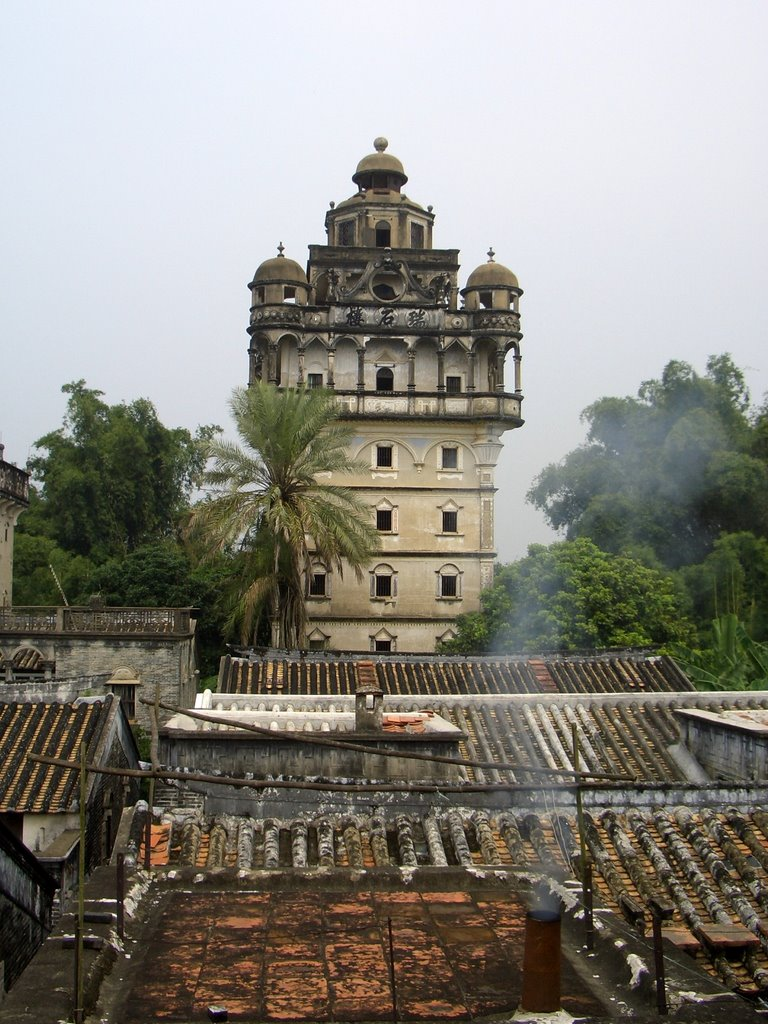
Ruishi Lou in Jinjiangli

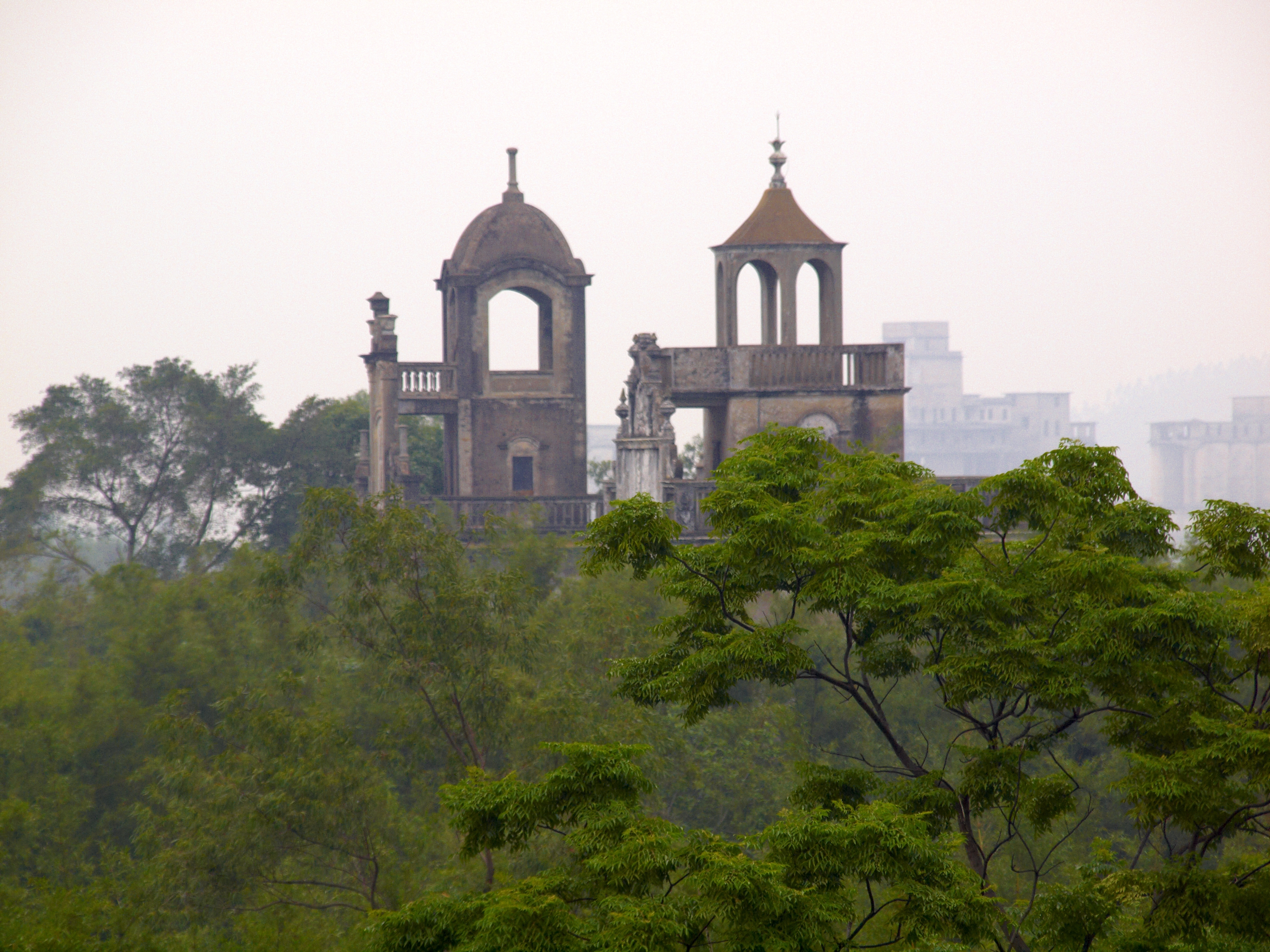
Majianglong Diaolou

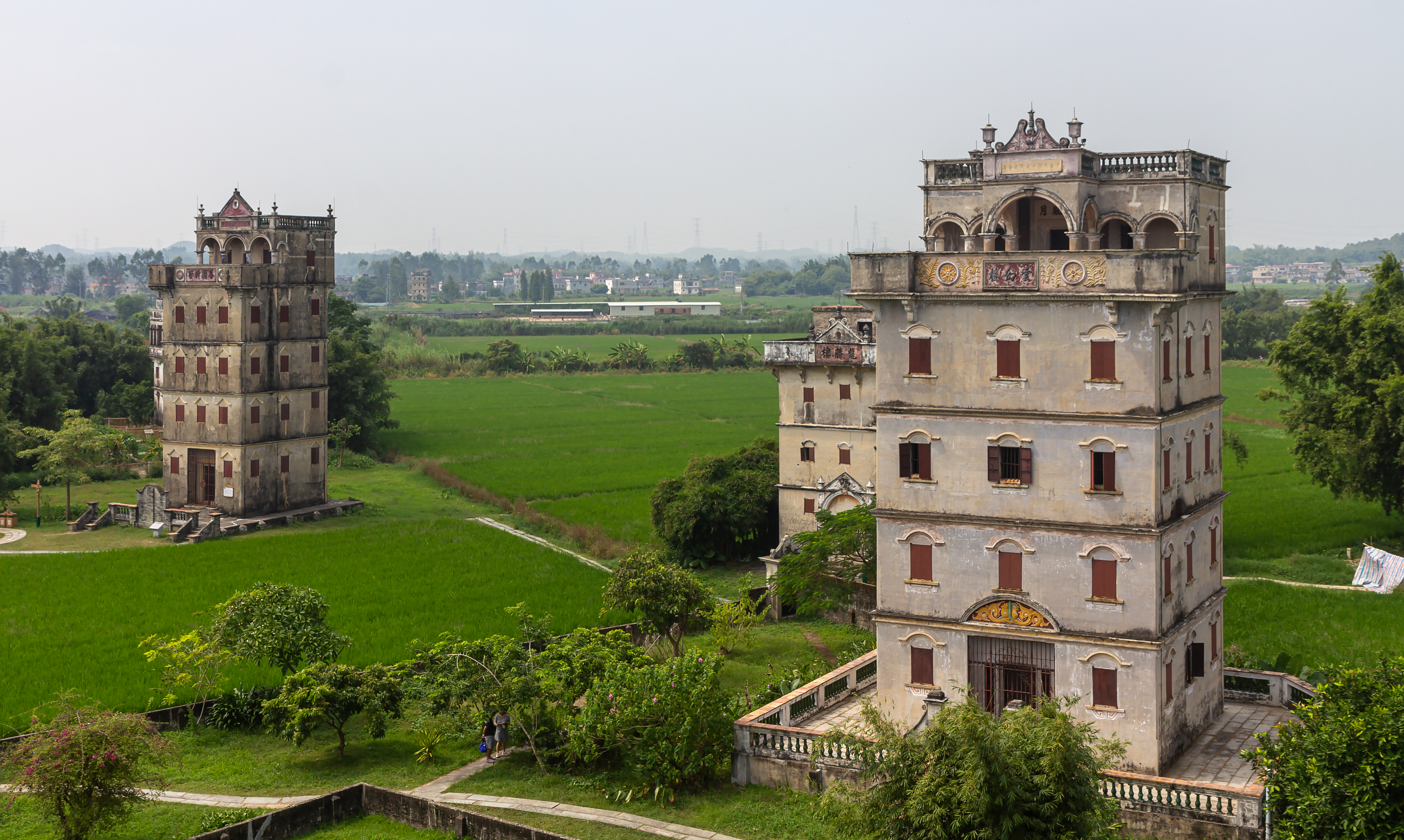
Diaolou cluster at Zilicun

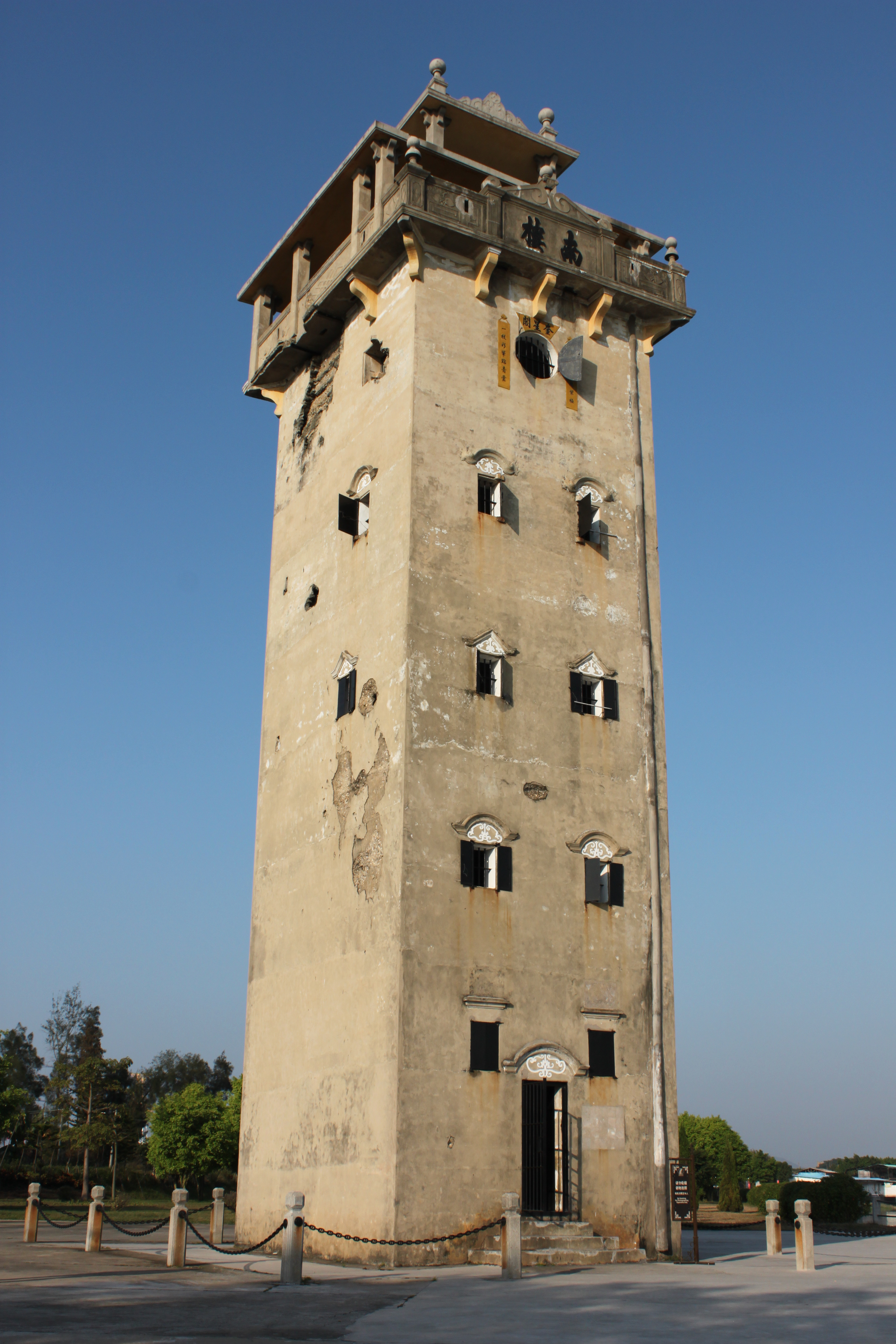
Nan Lou in Chikan

Examples of diaolous include:

- Yinglonglou (迎龙楼), oldest extant diaolou in Kaiping, in the village of Sanmenli (Chikan township) built by the Guan (关族) lineage during the Jiajing era of the Ming dynasty (1522–1566), is a massive three-storey fortress with one-meter thick walls, in contrast with the high tower diaolou built much later with the aid of Huaqiao.
- Jinjiangli Diaolou Cluster (锦江里雕楼群), situated behind Jinjiangli Village (Xiangang Township), includes three exquisite diaolous: Ruishi Lou, Shengfeng Lou, and Jinjiang Lou. Ruishi Diaolou, constructed in 1921, has nine floors and is the tallest diaolou in Kaiping. It features a Byzantine style roof and a Roman dome.
- The Majianglong diaolou cluster (马降龙雕楼群) is spread across five villages (Baihe township) in a bamboo forest: Yong'an and Nan'an Villages of the Huang (黄) family; Hedong, Qinglin, and Longjiang Villages of the Guan (关) family.
- Zilicun Diaolou Cluster (自力村雕楼群), located in Zilicun Village (Tangkou township), includes nine diaolous, the largest number among the four Kaiping villages designated by UNESCO. They feature the fusion of Chinese and various Western architectural styles and rise up surrealistically over the rice paddy fields.
- Fangshi Denglou - Built in 1920 after contributions from villagers, this denglou is five storeys high. It is referred to as the "Light Tower" because it had an enormous searchlight as bright as the beam of a lighthouse.
- Li Garden, in Beiyi Xiang, was constructed in 1936 by Mr. Xie Weili, a Chinese emigrant to the United States.
- Bianchouzhu Lou (The Leaning Tower), located in Nanxing Village was constructed in 1903. It has seven floors.
- Nan Lou (南楼), or the "Southern Diaolou", located on the riverbank in Chikan township, which was known for seven local soldiers by the surname Situ (司徒) who died defending Chikan from the Japanese.

=== Chikan ===
Chikan (赤坎) is officially designated as a National Historic and Cultural Town of China (中国历史文化名镇). The old town of Chikan has many historical sites that are about one hundred years old. For example, it has over 600 late-Qing and early-Republic historic Tong laus or Qilous (唐樓/ 騎樓) continuous, spanning over a length of 3 kilometers, including the riverside stretch along Dixi Lu (堤西路), sometimes referred to as 'European Styled Street'. Part of old Chikan town has been designated Chikan Studio City (赤坎影视城) for filming of historical scenes.

Chikan township also has two restored diaolous: Yinglonglou, built by the Guan (关族) lineage in the Ming dynasty, and Nanlou, memorialized by the martyrdom of seven Situ clan (司徒族) members in the early 20th century.

Historically, Chikan has been shaped by these two competing clans. One example is the existence of two libraries: the Situ's library, opened in 1926, and, not to be outdone, the Guan's library, opened in 1931; both libraries funded by overseas Chinese and incorporated architecture features from overseas.

It is popular local spot for braised pork in noodles.

Chikan is to become a tourist destination and the closing of local stores, dining posts, and streets are scheduled for the summer of 2017.

== Miscellaneous ==
Kaiping has been twinned with Mesa, Arizona, United States, since October 18, 1993.

Kaiping was a major source of emigrants at the turn of the 20th century. As a result, a large number of early Chinese Canadian and Chinese American communities had people who originated from Kaiping and its neighboring counties of Taishan, Enping and Xinhui, which is known collectively as Sze Yup. It is said that there are more Kaipingnese people living abroad today than there are Kaipingnese in Kaiping. In a 2016 report, Deloitte estimated that there are 750,000 Kaiping-born overseas Chinese.

In 1973, various people originated from Kaiping started the Hoi Ping Chamber of Commerce Secondary School in Hong Kong.
