= Giuseppe Mariotti =

Italian musician

Giuseppe Mariotti (1963-Broni) is an Italian classical pianist..

2003~ University of Music and Performing Arts, Vienna, dispatch professor at the music faculty of the Tokushima Bunri University. Since 2007, a full-time professor and dean of the music faculty.

2008~2010 Guest professor at the Kobe College of Music.

1982~1989 studied and graduated under Hans Graf in piano performance and under Georg Ebert in chamber music (with master's degree) at the Hochschule für Musik und darstellende Kunst (now University of Music and Performing Arts) in Vienna, Austria.

1997~2003 Generalmusikdirektor of the Minoritenkirche in Vienna, as indirect successor of Antonio Salieri.

1995~1998 recording of the complete original piano works by Ferruccio Busoni for the Italian label foné.

2009~ yearly summer course at the Wiener Musikseminar.

Performed more than 600 concerts worldwide since age 14, as a soloist and with chamber music groups.

Bösendorfer artist since 1994.
