= Marotti =

Marotti is an Italian surname. Notable people with the surname include:

- Davide Marotti (1881–1940), Italian chess player
- Lou Marotti (1915–2003), American football player

== See also ==
- Mariotti (surname)
