= Guido Venosta Foundation =

The Guido Venosta Foundation is a nonprofit organisation founded by Carla Fossati Bellani Venosta in 2000.

== Headquarters ==
The Foundation is based in Milan at Via Plinio 23 (registered office) and Via Durini 23 (operational headquarters).

== History ==
The Foundation is named in memory of Guido Venosta and was established on the initiative of its founding promoters: Carla Fossati Bellani Venosta, Fabrizio Du Chene, Stefano Alberti De Mazzeri, Gabriele Fuga, Alberto Falck, Renato Dulbecco, Umberto Veronesi, Giorgio Rumi, Ugo Amaldi, Francesco Garbagnati and Diana Bracco de Silva. Pirelli is an honorary founder.

Founded as an organisation dedicated to supporting scientific research and promoting public health, over the years it also been involved in charitable projects and cultural initiatives.

== Presidents ==
- Carla Fossati Bellani Venosta, 27 July 2000 - 1 June 2017
- Olesya Krasovka, 1 June 2017 - 15 Aprile 2020
- Giuseppe Caprotti, since 15 Aprile 2020

== Charitable initiatives ==
During the Covid-19 pandemic, it has supported the European Institute of Oncology (IEO) by funding research projects aimed at preventing the spread of the virus and by providing personal protective equipment to patients and staff. It also funds hospital beds, medical equipment and devices for italian hospitals such as Niguarda and the Policlinico of Milan, the Mandic Hospital in Merate and the Manzoni Hospital in Lecco, and the FIMMG. Abroad, it collaborates with Hope Onlus to set up intensive care units in Brazil.

Together with Le Comunità della Salute and the Volunteer Service Center of Monza, Lecco, and Sondrio, it participates in a project dedicated to preventing and addressing new forms of poverty. It promotes the “Happy. diventare capaci” project on adolescent well-being. To support families in need, it collaborates with the association L’Albero della Vita and with Caritas Ambrosiana, creating the Ostello della Solidarietà (Solidarity Hostel) for the homeless in Lecco.

It has also supported the renovation of the Casa della Carità in Seregno, launched the Taxi Solidale project, and contributed to the Spazio Aperto al Servizio della Comunità project in Milan, in support of people with disabilities and minors.

It also collaborates on cultural initiatives, such as the exhibition of Remo Salvadori’s work curated by Elena Tettamanti and Antonella Soldaini at Palazzo Reale in Milan, the promotion of the “L’età sospesa” and “Chi come me” projects by the Franco Parenti Theater, which address the themes of adolescence through theater and mental health. In 2024, it launched a reforestation project in Albiate covering an area of 25 hectares.
