= Massimo Mariotti =

Swiss footballer (born 1961)

Personal information
- Full name: Massimo Mariotti
- Date of birth: 22 November 1961 (age 64)
- Place of birth: Biel/Bienne, Switzerland
- Position: Defender

Youth career
- FC Biel-Bienne

Senior career*
Years	Team	Apps	(Gls)
1979–1981	FC Biel-Bienne		
1981–1988	FC Viktoria Köln		
1988–1989	Rimini F.C. 1912		
1989–1992	MSV Duisburg	35	(1)
- * Club domestic league appearances and goals as of 19:54, 9 June 2018 (UTC)

Massimo Mariotti (born 22 November 1961) is a retired Swiss footballer.
