= Bernardo Caprotti =

Italian businessman

- Born: 7 October 1925
- Died: 30 September 2016 (aged 90)
- Occupation: owner of Esselunga
- Spouse: Giuliana Albera
- Children: 3

Signature
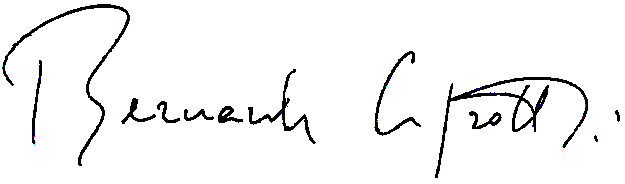

Bernardo Caprotti (7 October 1925 – 30 September 2016) was an Italian billionaire businessman, the owner of Esselunga, Italy's third-largest grocery store chain.

In his will, he left 66.7% of Esselunga to his second wife Giuliana Albera and their daughter Marina Sylvia, now executive of Esselunga, Princess Moncada by marriage, and 16.7% to each of his children from his first marriage, his son Giuseppe Caprotti and his daughter Violetta.
