= Tokushima Bunri University =

Private university in Tokushima, Japan

Coordinates: 34°12′9″N 134°36′19″E

- 徳島文理大学; Tokushima Bunri Daigaku
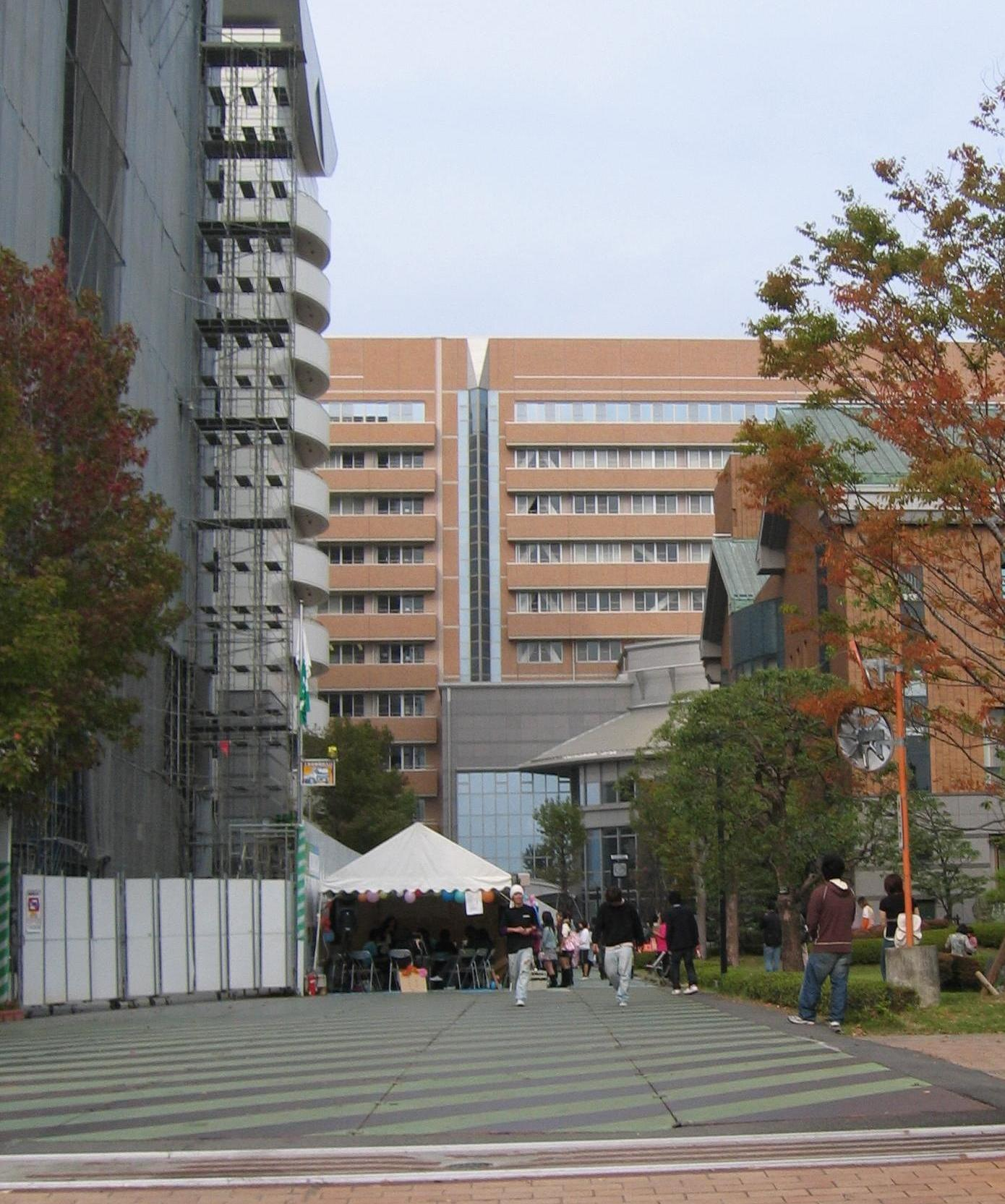
- Type: Private
- Established: 1895
- Location: Tokushima, Tokushima, Japan
- Campus: Tokushima, Tokushima Sanuki, Kagawa
- Website: www.bunri-u.ac.jp/

Tokushima Bunri University (徳島文理大学, Tokushima bunri daigaku) is a private university in Tokushima, Japan.

== History ==
In 1895, Sai Murasaki founded a private vocational school. In 1966, "Tokushima Women's University" was founded. In 1972, "Tokushima Women`s University" was renamed "Tokushima Bunri University".

In 1983, Tokushima Bunri University Kagawa Campus opens.

After several years of exchanges between Tokushima Bunri University and the University of Music and Performing Arts, Vienna, in 2000 a formal agreement was signed. One result is that professors from Vienna now come to Bunri to offer summer and winter cooperative seminars.

Tokushima Bunri University wanted to focus more on music treatment and conducted a mutual agreement with Shenandoah University, Virginia, USA whose professors actively pursue research on this topic.

== Faculty ==
- Pharmaceutical Science
- Engineering
- Pharmaceutical Science at Kagawa Campus
- Human Life Sciences
- Policy Studies
- Literature
- Music
- Junior College

== Attached schools ==
- Tokushima Bunri kindergarten
- Tokushima Bunri high school

== Sister school ==
Country	University	Year
Canada	Vancouver Community College	1988
United States	Massachusetts Institute of Technology	1995
Canada	Langara College	1995
United States	Indiana University	1998
Vietnam	Vietnam National University, Hanoi	1999
Austria	University of Music and Performing Arts, Vienna	2000
United States	Shenandoah University	2000
Hong Kong	University of Hong Kong	2003
South Korea	Dankook University	2004
Hong Kong	City University of Hong Kong	2005
Slovenia	Jožef Stefan Institute	2005
Italy	University of Pavia	2006
Australia	Griffith University	2008

== Notable associates ==
- Hiroyuki Nagao - kayaker, 2008 Summer Olympics representative of Japan
- Michael Frischenschlager - Violinist, former president of University of Music and Performing Arts, Vienna, emeritus professor of Bunri University
- Giuseppe Mariotti - pianist, professor of Bunri University.
- Ernst Friedrich Seiler - pianist, professor of Bunri University in 1974–1996.
