= Sze Yap people in Hong Kong =

Taishanese Cantonese
台山人 Hoi San Ngin

Total population
- Estimated: 2.0–2.5 million in Hong Kong

Regions with significant populations
- Kowloon and Hong Kong Island

Languages
- Taishanese, Cantonese and English

Religion
- Predominantly Mahayana Buddhism, Confucianism, Taoism, Traditional Chinese religion Minority Christianity

Related ethnic groups
- Other Han Chinese

Sze Yap people in Hong Kong
- Chinese: 四邑香港人
Transcriptions
Standard Mandarin
- Hanyu Pinyin: Sìyì Xiānggǎng rén
Yue: Cantonese
- Yale Romanization: Sei yāp hēung góng yàhn
other Yue
- Taishanese: Lhei1 yip2 Hiang1 kong2 ngin3

Sze Yap Cantonese represents the second largest Han group in Hong Kong after the group of people (Punti) originating in the Guangzhou-Sam Yap region. The Sze Yap Cantonese comes from a region in Guangdong in China called Sze Yap (四邑), now called Ng Yap, which consists of the counties of Taishan, Kaiping, Xinhui, Enping, Heshan and Jiangmen. The Sze Yap Cantonese group have contributed much to what makes Hong Kong a success. Hong Kong people of Sze Yap origin represented about 18.3% of Hong Kong's total population in 1961, and 17.4% in 1971; today this population still increases as more immigrants from the Taishanese-speaking areas of Guangdong in mainland China continue to immigrate to Hong Kong.

The Hong Kong census first began counting Sze Yap as an ancestral origin in 1961, and found that it was around 18.34% of the population, compared to 48.62% for the Guangzhou and Macau region. This census found that the district with the highest concentration of Sze Yap people was Sham Shui Po.

== Language ==
According to the 2011 Census and analysis done in the Routledge Handbook for Global Spanish, the constituency with the highest concentration of Sze Yap speakers was Nam Cheong Central in Sham Shui Po.

== Culture ==
Today many Hong Kong people of Sze Yap origin have become successful in areas such as the entertainment industry, business and politics. Hong Kongers of Sze Yap origin include Andy Lau, Beyond, Danny Chan, Kenny Kwan, Joey Yung, Ronnie Chan, John Tsang and Andrew Li. The "father of Hong Kong cinema", Lai Man-Wai, has ancestry from the Sze Yap region of Guangdong province. As a result, Sze Yap people have dominated in the Hong Kong entertainment industry and play most major roles in the music and movie sectors. In many Hong Kong films, Taishanese can be heard, especially in many of Karl Maka's films, such as Merry Christmas and Aces Go Places.

It is said that over 100 famous people come from the Sze Yap region of Guangdong, making the region famous for producing more stars than any other city/region in mainland China. As a result, the local government in Jiangmen which administers the Sze Yap or Ng Yap cities of Taishan, Kaiping, Enping, Xinhui, and Heshan, decided to build a Stars Park called Jiangmen star park (江门星光园).

The Cangdong Dialou village has been the setting of several films. Part of the film Let the Bullets Fly was shot in Kaiping, and the movie stars Chow Yun-fat, who is of Sze Yap ancestry. It's also the filming location of The Grandmaster, an Yip Man film starring Sze Yap descendant Tony Leung.

People from Kaiping (Hoi Ping) established the Hoi Ping Chamber of Commerce Secondary School in Homantin, Kowloon.

== Business ==
Besides dominating the entertainment industry, Sze Yap people are quite dominant and influential in Hong Kong's Business Industry, such as the Bank of East Asia (東亞銀行) (the Li family's ancestry is in Heshan), Lee Kum Kee (李錦記), Hang Lung Properties, Maxim's Catering (美心), Hysan Development, Li & Fung (利豐), Lui Che-woo of Galaxy Entertainment Group and K. Wah International Holdings Ltd and many others.

Lee Hysan, who was born in the Kingdom of Hawaii, had ancestry in Xinhui. His company Dysan Development is now the largest commercial property landlord in the Causeway Bay area.

== Hong Kong immigration ==
As many Sze Yap in Hong Kong who are either second, third or fourth generation Hong Kongers, Taishanese people speak Cantonese as their usual language and some may not know their ancestral origin. Therefore, that makes it hard to know the exact population, but based on the 1960s Hong Kong Census, it is probably right now about over 30% – 40%.

== Statistics ==
=== 1961 Census data of Sze Yap speakers by district ===
Hong Kong Island	%	Kowloon	%	New Territories	%	Islands	%
Central	1.3	Tsim Sha Tsui	2.2	Tsuen Wan	1.9	-	1.8
Sheung Wan	2.2	Yau Ma Tei	4.8	Tsing Yi	2.3		
West	2.0	Mong Kok	9.5	Ma Wan	4.4		
Mid-levels/Pok Fu Lam	0.7	Kowloon City	4.2	North	1.4		
Peak	0.5	Sham Shui Po	9.8	Sai Kung	0.6		
Wan Chai	3.5	Kwun Tong	2.6	Sha Tin	3.0		
Tai Hang	2.8	Wong Tai Sin	3.8	Tai Po	0.7		
North Point	2.6			Tuen Mun	4.7		
Shau Kei Wan	4.2			Yuen Long	3.1		
Aberdeen	0.8						
South	1.3						

Average: 4.35

Standard Deviation: 2.29

Coefficient of Variation: 0.78
