= 19th-century Chinese immigration to America =

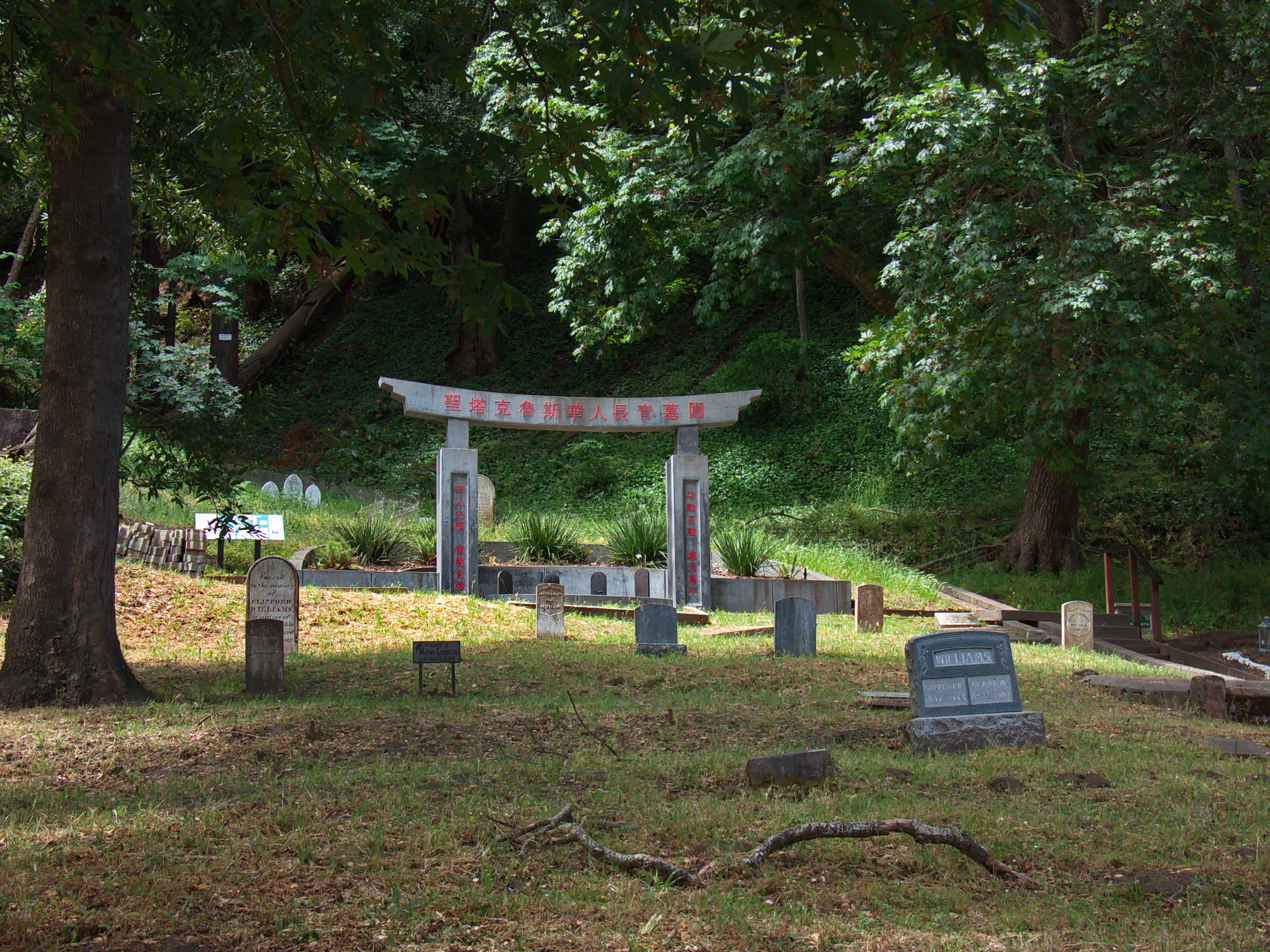
Newly constructed entrance gate to the historic Chinese section of Evergreen Cemetery in Santa Cruz, California

Chinese immigration to America in the 19th century is often referred to as the first wave of Chinese Americans. These immigrants were primarily Cantonese and Taishanese speakers.

In the 1980s, about half or more of the ethnic Chinese population in the United States had roots in Taishan, a city in southern China near Guangzhou. Before the 1990s, a large portion of the Chinese population in the U.S. consisted of Cantonese or Taishanese-speaking people, predominantly from Guangdong province in southern China.

This contrasts with post-1980s Chinese Americans, among whom more Mandarin-speaking immigrants arrived from northern China and Taiwan. Much of the Chinese population throughout the 1800s and early 1900s was concentrated in the Western United States, particularly California and Nevada, as well as New York City. Chinese immigrants and their descendants generally settled in Chinatowns (especially in San Francisco and New York) or in Chinese-populated districts within major city downtowns.

== 19th-century arrivals, cause for migration ==
According to U.S. government records, the first Chinese immigrants arrived in 1820. An estimated 325 men arrived before the 1849 California gold rush, which attracted a significant number of laborers from China who sought gold and performed manual labor. By 1852, there were 25,000 Chinese immigrants, and by 1880, the number had grown to 105,465, most of whom lived on the West Coast. They constituted over a tenth of California's population. Nearly all early Chinese immigrants were young men with varied educational backgrounds from rural villages in Toisan and the eight districts within Guangdong Province.

Guangdong province, particularly Toisan, experienced severe floods and famine in the mid-19th century, as well as mass political unrest like the Red Turban unrest and the Punti-Hakka Clan Wars. These factors prompted many people to migrate to America. The vast majority of 19th-century Chinese immigrants to the U.S. originated from a small area comprising eight districts on the west side of the Pearl River Delta in Guangdong province. These eight districts consist of three subgroups—the four districts of Sze Yup, the district of Chung Shan, and the three districts of Sam Yup—each subgroup speaking a distinct dialect of Cantonese. In the U.S., immigrants from Sze Yup generally worked as laborers; those from Chung Shan specialized in agriculture; and those from Sam Yup worked as entrepreneurs.

In the 1850s, Chinese workers migrated to the United States, initially for work in the gold mines, but also taking agricultural and factory jobs, particularly in the garment industry. Chinese immigrants were especially crucial in building railroads in the American West. As Chinese laborers achieved success in the United States, some became entrepreneurs. As the number of Chinese laborers increased, so did anti-Chinese sentiment among other workers in the U.S. economy. This eventually led to legislation aimed at limiting future immigration of Chinese workers to the United States, straining diplomatic relations between the United States and China through acts like the Chinese Exclusion Act.

By 1900, only 4,522 of the 89,837 Chinese migrants living in the U.S. were women. This lack of women migrants was largely attributed to U.S. anti-immigration laws. The Page Act of 1875 prohibited the immigration of women intended for prostitution from China. This law was broadly applied to limit the immigration of all Chinese women, not solely those involved in prostitution. Women dressed up as men to avoid detection due to the Page Act. Upon arrival in the U.S., Chinese men and women were separated while awaiting immigration hearings, which often took weeks. During this time, women faced extensive questioning focusing on their family life and origins. Their answers were cross-referenced with others from their village, and any inconsistencies were used to deny entry. The stress of separation from family caused illness among many women awaiting hearings. Some committed suicide fearing denial of entry. Once approved, Chinese women migrants faced further challenges. Many were coerced into prostitution; over 60% of adult Chinese women in California in 1870 were estimated to be working in the trade. Some women were lured to the U.S. with promises of marriage only to become sex slaves, while others immigrated to reunite with family. Ninety percent of Chinese women who immigrated between 1898 and 1908 did so to join a husband or father. Chinese women migrants, like men, also immigrated for economic opportunities.

== California gold rush, Central Pacific Railroad construction ==
The Chinese arrived in California in large numbers during the California gold rush, with 40,400 recorded arrivals from 1851 to 1860. In the 1860s, the Central Pacific Railroad recruited large labor gangs, many on five-year contracts, to build its portion of the first transcontinental railroad. Chinese laborers proved effective, and thousands more were recruited until the railroad's completion in 1869. Chinese labor provided the massive workforce needed to build most of the Central Pacific's challenging route through the Sierra Nevada mountains and across Nevada. By 1869, the ethnic Chinese population in the U.S. numbered at least 100,000.

== Objections to Chinese immigration, 1882 Chinese Exclusion Act ==
Nativist objections to Chinese immigration primarily stemmed from economic and cultural tensions, alongside ethnic discrimination. Most Chinese laborers immigrated to the United States to send money back to China to support their families. Many also had to repay loans to the Chinese merchants who funded their passage. These financial pressures often compelled them to accept lower wages. Non-Chinese laborers typically required higher wages to support wives and children in the United States and generally had stronger political standing to bargain for higher pay. Consequently, many non-Chinese workers resented Chinese laborers, fearing they would be displaced by cheaper labor. Furthermore, many Chinese settled in their own neighborhoods, called Chinatowns. Tales spread depicting Chinatowns as places where large numbers of Chinese men gathered for prostitution, opium smoking, or gambling. Some advocates of anti-Chinese legislation argued that admitting Chinese immigrants lowered the cultural and moral standards of American society. Others employed overtly racist arguments for limiting immigration from East Asia, expressing concern about the integrity of American racial composition.

From the 1850s through the 1870s, the California state government passed measures targeting Chinese residents, such as requiring special licenses for Chinese businesses or workers and preventing naturalization. Because anti-Chinese discrimination and efforts to halt immigration violated the 1868 Burlingame–Seward Treaty with China, the federal government invalidated much of this state legislation.

The Chinese population in the U.S. rose from 2,716 in 1851 to 63,000 by 1871. In the decade 1861–1870, 64,301 arrivals were recorded, followed by 123,201 in 1871–80 and 61,711 in 1881–1890. 77% were located in California, with the remainder dispersed across the American West, the South, and New England. Most immigrants from Toisan sought a better life to escape starvation and economic hardships.

In 1879, immigration restriction advocates successfully introduced and passed legislation in Congress to limit the number of Chinese arriving to fifteen per ship. Republican President Rutherford B. Hayes vetoed the bill, citing its violation of U.S. treaty agreements with China. Nevertheless, it marked an important victory for exclusion advocates. Democrats, led by supporters in the West, pushed for outright exclusion of Chinese immigrants. While Republicans were largely sympathetic to western concerns, their platform favored free immigration. To appease western states without offending China, President Hayes sought a revision of the Burlingame-Seward Treaty in which China agreed to limit immigration to the United States.

In 1880, the Hayes administration appointed U.S. diplomat James B. Angell to negotiate a new treaty with China. The resulting Angell Treaty allowed the United States to restrict, but not completely prohibit, Chinese immigration. In 1882, Congress passed the Chinese Exclusion Act, which, under the terms of the Angell Treaty, suspended the immigration of Chinese laborers (skilled or unskilled) for 10 years. The Act also mandated that every Chinese person traveling in or out of the country carry a certificate identifying their status as a laborer, scholar, diplomat, or merchant. The 1882 Act was the first in American history to impose broad restrictions on immigration based on nationality.

For American presidents and congressmen addressing Chinese exclusion, the challenge was balancing domestic attitudes and politics, which favored anti-Chinese policies, with maintaining good diplomatic relations with China, where exclusion was seen as an affront and a violation of treaty promises. Ultimately, domestic factors outweighed international concerns. In 1888, Congress passed the Scott Act, making reentry to the United States illegal after a visit to China, even for long-term legal residents. The Chinese government considered this act a direct insult but could not prevent its passage. In 1892, Congress renewed exclusion for ten years in the Geary Act. In 1902, the prohibition was expanded to cover the Hawaii and the Philippines, despite strong objections from the Chinese government and people. Congress later extended the Chinese Exclusion Act indefinitely.

The initial immigrant group was heavily male, potentially as high as 90%, partly due to the nature of the Chinese Exclusion Act, leading many immigrants to intend to earn money and return to China to start a family. The severe gender ratio imbalance caused by the Exclusion Acts resulted in many isolated, predominantly bachelor communities slowly aging in place with very low Chinese birth rates in the U.S. Later, as a result of the 1868 Fourteenth Amendment and the 1898 United States v. Wong Kim Ark Supreme Court decision, ethnic Chinese born in the United States became American citizens.

The Chinese Exclusion Acts remained law until 1943. Coupled with existing complications from the Treaties of Wangxia and Tianjian, the increasingly harsh restrictions on Chinese immigration and the widespread rising discrimination against Chinese living in the United States from the 1870s to the early 1900s placed significant strain on the diplomatic relationship between the United States and China.

== Integration, interracial marriage ==
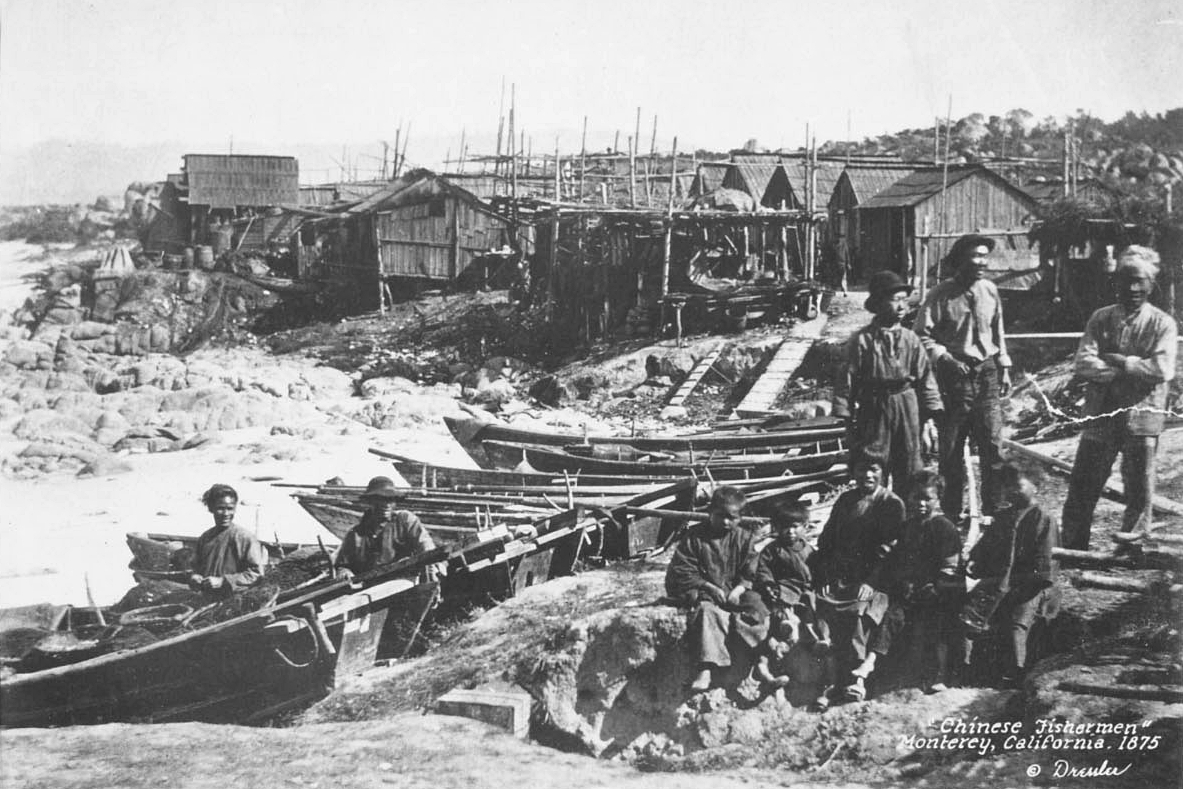
Chinese American fisherman, circa 1917

In the mid-1850s, 70 to 150 Chinese individuals lived in New York City, and 11 of them married Irish women. In 1906, The New York Times reported that 300 Irish American women were married to Chinese men in New York, with many more cohabiting. Based on Liang's research in 1900, among the 120,000 men in over 20 Chinese communities in the United States, he estimated that one out of every twenty Chinese (Cantonese) men was married to a white woman. The 1960 census showed 3,500 Chinese men married to white women and 2,900 Chinese women married to white men. At the beginning of the 20th century in New York, there was a 55% rate of Chinese men engaging in interracial marriage, which was maintained in the 1920s but declined to 20% in the 1930s.

During and after World War II, severe immigration restrictions were eased as the United States allied with China against the Japanese's expansionism. Later reforms in the 1960s, such as the Immigration and Nationality Act of 1965, prioritized family reunification, allowing relatives of U.S. citizens to receive preference in immigration, significantly changing the demographics of Chinese immigration.

== See also ==
- History of Chinese Americans
- Chinese Americans in the California Gold Rush
- Category:Qing dynasty emigrants to the United States
- Category:Coolie trade
- History of immigration to the United States
