= Siyi (disambiguation) =

- Siyi (四邑, 'Four Counties'), is a region in southern Guangdong province, China

Siyi may also refer to:

- Siyi dialect, a branch of Yue Chinese language
- Siyi, or Four Barbarians, a historical term for non-Chinese peoples
- Siyi, or Four arts, the four accomplishments of the ancient Chinese scholar-gentleman

== See also ==
- Sanyi ('Three Counties')
