= Siyi Yue =

Yue Chinese dialect of Guangdong province

Siyi
- Seiyap, Sze Yup
- Native to: Guangdong, China; Sze Yup Chinese communities in Hong Kong, Southeast Asia and the Americas.
- Region: Siyi (Jiangmen)
- Speakers: 3.88 million (2012)
- Language family: Sino-Tibetan: Sinitic; Chinese; Yue; Siyi
- Dialects: Taishan dialect; Xinhui dialect; Siqian dialect (Xinhui); Guzhen dialect; Enping dialect; Kaiping dialect

Language codes
- ISO 639-3: None (mis)
- ISO 639-6: siiy
- Glottolog: siyi1236
- Linguasphere: 77-AAA-mb
- Siyi (lower right), among other Yue and Pinghua groups in Guangxi and Guangdong

Chinese name
- Chinese: 四邑方言
Transcriptions
Standard Mandarin
- Hanyu Pinyin: Sìyì fāngyán
- Bopomofo: ㄙˋ ㄧˋ ㄈㄤ ㄧㄢˊ
Yue: Cantonese
- Jyutping: sei3 jap1 fong1 jin4
other Yue
- Taishanese: ɬi˧ jip˥ foŋ˧ ŋun˨

Alternative Chinese name
- Chinese: 四邑話
Transcriptions
Standard Mandarin
- Hanyu Pinyin: Sìyìhuà
- Bopomofo: ㄙˋ ㄧˋ ㄏㄨㄚˋ
Yue: Cantonese
- Jyutping: sei3 jap1 waa2
other Yue
- Taishanese: ɬi˧ jip˥ va˧˨˥

A speaker of Siyi Yue, specifically Huicheng dialect, recorded in China.

Siyi (Seiyap or Sze Yup in Cantonese; Chinese: 四邑方言; pinyin: Sìyì fāngyán; Jyutping: sei3 jap1 fong1 jin4 meaning "Four Hamlets") is a coastal branch of Yue Chinese spoken mainly in Guangdong province, but is also used in overseas Chinese communities. Within the province, it is mainly spoken in the prefecture-level city of Jiangmen, but pockets exist outside Jiangmen, including the Doumen and Jinwan districts in Zhuhai, Guzhen in Zhongshan and Jun'an in Foshan. Taishanese, which was one of the most important Chinese dialects in Chinese American communities, is considered a representative dialect.

== Etymology ==
The name "Sze Yup" or "Seiyap" (Chinese: 四邑; pinyin: Sìyì; Cantonese Yale: sei yāp; lit. 'Four Counties') refers to the historical four counties of Jiangmen prefecture: Xinhui, Taishan, Enping and Kaiping.

Since a fifth county, Heshan, was added to the prefecture in 1983, this region is referred to as the "Five Counties" (Chinese: 五邑; pinyin: Wǔyì; Cantonese Yale: nǵh yāp) in the province; but for historical reasons, the term "Seiyap" is still used amongst the overseas Chinese communities.

It has also been called Delta Cantonese because all the aforementioned counties are in the Pearl River Delta.

== Geographic distribution ==
The Siyi dialect is mainly distributed along the drainage basin of the Tan river (Chinese: 潭江), as well as part of the region west of the main stream of the Xi River, near to the confluence of the two rivers. Most of the region in which Siyi is spoken is administered by the prefecture-level city of Jiangmen, including the Jiangmen city districts of Jianghai, Pengjiang and Xinhui, as well as the county-level cities of Taishan, Kaiping, Enping and the southeastern part of Heshan, but the dialect is also spoken in parts of Zhuhai, the town of Guzhen in Zhongshan and the town of Jun'an in Foshan. In terms of geographic extremes, Siyi is spoken furthest north in Yayao (雅瑶), Heshan; furthest south in Xiachuan Island, Taishan; furthest east in Hongqi (红旗), Zhuhai; and furthest west in Naji (那吉), Enping. The total geographic area of the region is approximately 9000 square kilometers and the total number of speakers is estimated at 3.9 million in 2010.

== Dialectal variation ==
The table below compares the numbers 1-10 in various dialects of Siyi Yue. Pronunciations are given in IPA.

English	Heshan (Shaping)	Kaiping (Chikan)	Kaiping (Cangcheng)	Kaiping (Shatang)	Taishan (Dajiang)	Taishan (Doushan)	Pengjiang (Northern Hetang)	Pengjiang (Southern Hetang)	Pengjiang (Shuinan)	Pengjiang (Baisha)	Pengjiang (Zilai)	Pengjiang (Shazaiwei)	Pengjiang (Xuding)	Xinhui (Tianhu)	Xinhui (Luokeng)	Xinhui (Huicheng)
one	jɐt^{55}	jit^{55}	jit^{55}	jit^{55}	jit^{55}	ʝit^{55}	jit^{55} or jit^{33}	jit^{55} or jit^{33}	jɐt^{35}	jɐt^{45}	jɐt^{45}	jit^{45}	jɐt^{45}	jit^{45}	jit^{45}	jɜt^{45}
two	ji^{22}	ŋɛi^{32}	ŋei^{32}	ŋei^{32}	ŋei^{32}	ŋi^{11}	ȵi^{22}	ȵi^{22}	ji^{31}	ji^{32}	ji^{32}	ji^{32}	ji^{32}	ŋei^{32}	ŋei^{32}	ŋi^{32}
three	sam^{33}	ɬam^{33}	sam^{33}	sam^{33}	ɬam^{33}	ɬam^{33}	ɬam^{24}	ɬam^{24}	sam^{23}	sam^{23}	sam^{23}	sam^{23}	sam^{23}	sam^{23}	sam^{21}	sɑm^{23}
four	sɐi^{33}	ɬɛi^{33}	sei^{33}	sei^{33}	ɬei^{33}	ɬi^{33}	ɬi33	ɬi33	sei^{23}	sei^{23}	sei^{23}	si^{23}	sei^{23}	sei^{23}	sei^{23}	sei^{45}
five	ŋ^{55}	ŋ^{55}	m̩^{55}	m̩^{55}	m^{55}	m^{55}	ŋ^{55}	ŋ^{55}	m^{35}	m^{45}	m^{45}	m^{45}	m^{45}	m^{45}	m^{45}	m^{45}
six	lʊk^{22}	lək^{32}	lʊk^{32}	lʊk^{32}	lək^{32}	lʊk^{11}	lʊk^{22}	lʊk^{22}	lʊk^{31}	lʊk^{32}	lʊk^{32}	lʊk^{32}	lʊk^{32}	lʊk^{32}	lʊk^{32}	lək^{32}
seven	t^{h}ɐt^{55}	tʰɜt^{55}	ʦʰət^{55}	ʦʰət^{55}	tʰit^{55}	tʰɛt^{55}	tʰit^{55}	tʰit^{55}	tʰɐt^{35}	ʦʰɐt^{45}	ʦʰɐt^{45}	ʦʰɐt^{45}	ʦʰɐt^{45}	ʦʰɜt^{45}	ʦʰɜt^{45}	ʦʰɜt^{45}
eight	pεt^{33}	ʋat^{33}	pat^{33}	ʋat^{33}	pɔt^{33}	pat^{33}	ɓɐt^{33}	wɐt^{33}	pɛt^{35}	pat^{45}	pat^{45}	pɛt^{35}	pat^{45}	ʋat^{23}	pat^{23}	pɑt^{23}
nine	kɐu^{55}	--	kəu^{55}	kəu^{55}	kiu^{55}	kiu^{55}	kiu^{55}	kiu^{55}	kɐu^{35}	kɐu^{45}	kɐu^{45}	kɐu^{45}	kɐu^{45}	kɜu^{45}	kiau^{45}	kɜu^{45}
ten	sɐp^{22}	ɕip^{32}	sip^{32}	sip^{32}	sip^{32}	sip^{11}	sip^{22}	sip^{22}	sɐp^{31}	sɐp^{32}	sɐp^{32}	sɐp^{32}	sɐp^{32}	sip^{32}	sip^{32}	sɜp^{32}
