= Sanyi (disambiguation) =

Sanyi refers to the three districts of Nanhai, Panyu and Shunde surrounding Guangzhou and Foshan in Guangdong, China.

Sanyi may also refer to the following places in mainland China or Taiwan:

- Sanyi, Mengcheng County (三义镇), town in Mengcheng County, Anhui
- Sanyi Township, Pengshui County (三义乡), in Pengshui Miao and Tujia Autonomous County, Chongqing
- Sanyi Township, Fuyu County, Jilin (三义乡), in Fuyu County, Jilin
- Sanyi, Miaoli (三義鄉), township in Miaoli County, Taiwan

== See also ==
- Siyi
- Sándor, a Hungarian name
