= Su Sanniang =

Chinese rebel leader (1830–1854)

- 蘇三娘
- Born: 1830; Guandong Province
- Died: Possibly 1854
- Military career
- Allegiance: Nian Rebels; Taiping Heavenly Kingdom
- Rank: Commander
- Commands: Taiping army
- Conflicts: Taiping Rebellion

Su Sanniang (蘇三娘; 1830–1854), was a Chinese rebel during the Taiping Rebellion. The leader of a band of outlaws, she joined the rebellion with a band of 2000 soldiers.

== Biography ==
Su Sanniang was born around the 1830s in the south Guandong Province, where the Hakka are the majority. Unlike the northern Han, where the farm work was masculine and the women only took care of the housework, the Hakka women also collaborated in the collection of tea, in the cultivation of rice and plowed with water buffaloes, they didn't followed the Confucian codes as strictly and their feet were not bound. According to The Biographical Dictionary of Chinese Women, Su Sanniang learned martial arts and swordplay from her family. She was said to have powerful arms and “the air of a hero”.

Su Sanniang moved with her husband to Guangxi, where he was killed by bandits. The authorities barely paid attention due to him being a simple peasant, so she swore revenge. She managed to gather a hundred young people and toured the region with them until she found and killed the bandits. Persecuted by the authorities, Su Sanniang and her gang dedicated themselves to rob the rich to divide their wealth among the poor. This earned Su the sympathy of the people and more volunteers joined their group.

Su Sanniang and the two thousand men under her command joined the Taiping Rebellion, a devastating civil war. It lasted from 1850 to 1864 and at one point involved over one million soldiers, both men and women. The Rebellion was known for advocating equal rights for women, but also for mandating separation between women and men. When the men's and women's forces were divided, Su Sanniang became the leader of the female battalions, alongside Qiu Ersao, who was one of the commanders of Red Turban Rebels.

The last historical record about her places her in the Siege of Zhenjiang City in 1854. It is unknown if she died there or survived.

== Sources ==
- Lily Xiao Hong Lee, Clara Lau, A.D. Stefanowska: Biographical Dictionary of Chinese Women: v. 1: The Qing Period, 1644–1911
- Kazuko Ono: Chinese Women in a Century of Revolution, 1850–1950
