= Jiangmen Star Park =

Celebrity park in Jiangmen, China

- Traditional Chinese: 江門星光園
- Simplified Chinese: 江门星光园
Transcriptions
Standard Mandarin
- Hanyu Pinyin: Jiāngmén Xīngguāng Yuán
Yue: Cantonese
- Jyutping: Gong¹-mun⁴-sing¹-gwong¹-jyun⁴

Jiangmen Star Park (Chinese: 江门星光园) is a celebrity park opened in November 2010 in Jiangmen, Guangdong, China at an estimated cost of 10 million yuan.

== Theme ==
The theme of the park is based on notable celebrities with specific ancestral roots from the Greater Taishan Region of Taishan, Kaiping, Xinhui & Jiangmen, Enping, Heshan. The list is quite long with about 120 celebrities. The following are some notable people from within a particular district of the same city.

Celebrity Theme Park
District	Celebrities
Pengiang	Andy Lau, Joey Yung
Jianghai	Eric Tsang, Connie Chan Po-chu
Xinhui	Lai Man-Wai, Alan Tam, Gigi Leung, Hacken Lee, Gillian Chung
Toishan	Tony Leung, Donnie Yen, Wong Ka Kui, Danny Chan
Kaiping	Chow Yun-fat, Kenny Kwan
Heshan	Raymond Wong
Enping	Ekin Cheng

Others include: Kenny Bee, Bobby Au-Yeung, Patrick Tam, Jamie Chik. So far Yi Jianlian is the only person not to be from the TV-film-music entertainment industry. He is a basketball player.

== Opening ==
Throughout the year in 2010 many hand prints of celebrities were collected. In the afternoon of November 6, 2010 an official opening ceremony was held at the park with many in attendance including Andy Lau, Tony Leung, Eric Tsang, Maggie Cheung Ho-yee, Xia Yu, Kiki Sheung, Gillian Cheung and many others. A large night celebration concert was held at the Five Counties cultural center (五邑文化广场) and televised by TVB to Hong Kong in an event called "Stars shine over Jiangmen" (群星閃耀江門情). Main performers include Gigi Leung, Jenny Tseng, Wong Ka Keung, Joey Yung, Andy Lau, Gillian Cheung and members from The Voice. Others in attendance include the Chief Executive of Macau Fernando Chui and a crowd of about 15,000 at the square.
