= Xinhui dialect =

Yue Chinese dialect spoken in southern China

- Native to: China, Malaysia
- Region: Sze Yup, the Pearl River Delta; Ipoh, Selangor and Kuala Lumpur, Malaysia
- Language family: Sino-Tibetan: Sinitic; Chinese; Yue; Siyi; Xinhui dialect

Language codes
- ISO 639-3: –

Xinhui dialect
- Traditional Chinese: 新會話
- Simplified Chinese: 新会话
Transcriptions
Standard Mandarin
- Hanyu Pinyin: Xīnhuì huà
Yue: Cantonese
- Yale Romanization: Sānwuih wá
- Jyutping: San1 wui6 waa2

The Xinhui dialect (simplified Chinese: 新会话; traditional Chinese: 新會話; pinyin: Xīnhuì huà; Jyutping: san1 wui6 waa2)，alternatively romanized in Cantonese and local dialect as Sunwuinese, is a Yue Chinese language native to the speakers in and around Xinhui, Jiangmen, Guangdong Province, as well as in overseas communities where Xinhui people live. It is also one of the representative dialects of the Siyi Yue, with the Huicheng accent as the standard pronunciation.

== Sub-dialect ==
The new Huihua can be divided into the Huibei Sub-region, the Huizhong Sub-region, and the Huinan Sub-region.
