= Taishanese =

Dialect of Yue Chinese

- Native to: China, overseas communities particularly in United States and Canada
- Region: Sze Yup, the Pearl River Delta; United States: historic Chinese communities in Chinatown, San Francisco, other parts of the San Francisco Bay Area of California such as in the San Jose and Oakland areas, Chinatown, Boston and nearby Quincy, Massachusetts, and New York City, Seattle, Washington; Canada: Montreal, Toronto and Vancouver
- Ethnicity: Taishanese
- Language family: Sino-Tibetan: Sinitic; Chinese; Yue; Siyi; Taishanese

Language codes
- ISO 639-3: –
- ISO 639-6: tisa
- Glottolog: tois1237
- Linguasphere: 79-AAA-mbc

Taishanese
- Traditional Chinese: 臺山話
- Simplified Chinese: 台山话
Transcriptions
Standard Mandarin
- Hanyu Pinyin: Táishān huà
Yue: Cantonese
- Yale Romanization: Tòihsāan wá
- Jyutping: Toi4 saan1 waa2
other Yue
- Taishanese: Hoi5 san1 wa5

Taishanese (simplified Chinese: 台山话; traditional Chinese: 臺山話; pinyin: Táishān huà; Jyutping: toi4 saan1 waa2), alternatively romanized in Cantonese as Toishanese or Toisanese, in local dialect as Hoisanese or Hoisanwa, is a Yue Chinese language native to Taishan, Guangdong.

Even though they are related, Taishanese has little mutual intelligibility with Cantonese, and is not a dialect of Cantonese but a separate Yue language. Taishanese is also spoken throughout Sze Yup (or Siyi in the pinyin romanization of Standard Mandarin Chinese), located on the western fringe of the Pearl River Delta in Guangdong, China.

In the late 19th century and early 20th century, most of the Chinese immigration to North America originated in Sze Yup (which includes Taishan). Thus, up to the mid-20th century, Taishanese was the dominant variety of the Chinese language spoken in Chinatowns in Canada and the United States. It was formerly the lingua franca of the overseas Chinese residing in the United States.

== Names ==
The earliest linguistic studies refer to the dialect of Llin-nen or Xinning (traditional Chinese: 新寧; simplified Chinese: 新宁). Xinning was renamed Taishan in 1914, and linguistic literature has since generally referred to the local dialect as the Taishan dialect, a term based on the pinyin romanization of Standard Mandarin Chinese pronunciation. Alternative names have also been used. The term Toishan is a convention used by the United States Postal Service, the Defense Language Institute and the 2000 United States census. The terms Toishan, Toisan, and Toisaan are all based on Cantonese pronunciation and are also frequently found in linguistic and non-linguistic literature. Hoisan is a term based on the local pronunciation, although it is not generally used in published literature.

These terms have also been anglicized with the suffix -ese: Taishanese, Toishanese, and Toisanese. Of the previous three terms, Taishanese is most commonly used in academic literature, to about the same extent as the term Taishan dialect. The terms Hoisanese and Hoisan-wa do appear in print literature, although they are used more on the internet.

Another term used is Sìyì (Sze Yup or Seiyap in Cantonese romanization; Chinese: 四邑; lit. 'four counties'). Sìyì or Sze Yup refers to a previous administrative division in the Pearl River Delta consisting of the four counties of Taishan, Kaiping, Enping and Xinhui. In 1983, a fifth county (Heshan) was added to the Jiangmen prefecture; so whereas the term Sìyì has become an anachronism, the older term Sze Yup remains in current use in overseas Chinese communities where it is their ancestral home. The term Wǔyì (Chinese: 五邑), literally "five counties", refers to the modern administrative region, but this term is not used to refer to Taishanese.

== History ==
Taishanese originates in the Taishan region, where it is spoken. Taishanese can also be seen as a group of very closely related, mutually intelligible dialects spoken in the various towns and villages in and around the Siyi region (literally the 'Four Counties' of Toishan, Hoiping, Yanping, Sunwui, transcribed from Standard Cantonese; the names Taishan, Kaiping, Enping and Xinhui, as above, are romanized from Standard Mandarin using Pinyin).

Although this area started undergoing sinicization from the late Han dynasty, Xinhui was decreed as a district during the Northern and Southern dynasties, whilst Enping was established in 622 during the Tang dynasty. Taishan itself was split from Xinhui in 1499, during the Ming dynasty, whilst Kaiping was established in 1649 during the Qing dynasty from territory formerly under Xinhui, Enping, and Xinxing. Thus, as a branch of Yue Chinese, Taishanese is derived from Middle Chinese. Within Siyi, Taishanese proper is closest to the dialect of Kaiping, both phonologically and lexically. It also bears phonological resemblance to the speech of Heshan, a later addition to the region.

A vast number of Taishanese immigrants journeyed worldwide through the Taishan diaspora. The Taishan region was a major source of Chinese immigrants through continental Americas from the late-19th to mid-20th centuries. Taishanese was the predominant dialect spoken by the 19th-century Chinese builders of railroads in North America. Approximately 1.3 million people are estimated to have origins in Taishan. Prior to the signing of the Immigration and Naturalization Act of 1965, which allowed new waves of Chinese immigrants, Taishanese was the dominant dialect spoken in Chinatowns across North America.

As of 2015 Taishanese is still spoken in many Chinatowns throughout North America, including those of San Francisco, Oakland, Los Angeles, New York City, Boston, Vancouver, Toronto, Chicago, and Montreal by older generations of Chinese immigrants and their children, but is today being supplanted by Cantonese and increasingly by Mandarin in both older and newer Chinese communities alike, across the continent.

In Latin America, varieties of Siyi Yue such as Taishanese have historically been spoken in several Chinese immigrant communities, although their present-day vitality varies considerably. In Valencia, Venezuela, where a large proportion of the Chinese community traces its origins to Enping, the heritage language remains in use within the family and across the wider Chinese community, with documentation of its intergenerational use alongside Spanish. São Paulo and Rio de Janeiro also have substantial Taishanese communities, particularly from Haiyan. Large-scale chain migration from the township to Brazil was reported to have started in 1992, in the footsteps of previous generations of Taishanese migrants, continuing into the 2010s. Although Taishanese remains widely attested among Chinese Brazilians, there has been intergenerational shift toward Portuguese, with Mandarin increasingly prominent among newer immigrants and across the community.

In Lima, Peru, a Taishanese community identity survives through organizations such as the Sociedad Tai Shan del Perú, but heritage language retention has declined considerably. In Panama, Chinese immigration beginning in the mid-19th century drew heavily from the Siyi area, and Taishanese remains among the Chinese varieties reported in the country, alongside Cantonese, Hakka and Mandarin.

== Relationship with Cantonese ==
Taishanese is a language of the Yue branch of Chinese, which also includes Cantonese. However, due to ambiguities in the meaning of "Cantonese" in the English language, as it can refer to both the greater Yue dialect group or its prestige standard (Standard Cantonese), "Taishanese" and "Cantonese" are commonly used in mutually exclusive contexts, i.e. Taishanese is treated separately from "Cantonese". Despite the closeness of the two, they are hardly mutually intelligible.

Like other Yue dialects, such as the Goulou dialects, Taishanese pronunciation and vocabulary may sometimes differ greatly from Cantonese. Although Taishan stands only 60 miles (100 km) from the city of Guangzhou, they are separated by numerous rivers, and the dialect of Taishan is among the most linguistically distant Yue dialects from the Guangzhou dialect.Taishanese shares resemblance to Eastern Guangdong's Huizhou dialects, possibly due to both being a hybrid dialect of Yue Cantonese, Hakka, and Hokkien.

Cantonese functions as a lingua franca in Guangdong province, and speakers of other Chinese varieties (such as Chaozhou, Minnan, Hakka) living in Guangdong may also speak Cantonese. On the other hand, Standard Mandarin Chinese is the standard language of the People's Republic of China and the only legally allowed medium for teaching in schools throughout most of the country (except in minority areas), so residents of Taishan speak Mandarin as well. Although the Chinese government has been making great efforts to popularize Mandarin by administrative means, most Taishan residents do not speak Mandarin in their daily lives, but treat it as a second language, with Cantonese being the lingua franca of their region.

== Phonology ==
=== Initial consonants ===
There are 19 to 23 initials consonants (or onsets) in Taishanese, which is shown in the chart below in IPA:

		Labial	Dental/ Alveolar		Palatal		Velar	Glottal
		Labial	plain	sibilant		plain	Velar	Glottal
Nasal		m^{1}	n^{1}				ŋ^{1}	
Stop	prenasal	ᵐb^{1}	ⁿd^{1}				ᵑɡ^{1}	
Stop	plain	p	t	t͡s^{2}	t͡ɕ^{2}		k	ʔ
Stop	aspirated	pʰ	tʰ	t͡sʰ^{2}	t͡ɕʰ^{2}		kʰ	
Fricative	voiceless	f	ɬ	s^{2}	ɕ^{2}			h
Fricative	voiced	v			ʒ^{3}			
Approximant			l			j^{3,4}	w^{5}	

1. The respective nasal onsets (/m/, /n/, and /ŋ/) are allophones of the pre-nasalized voiced stop onsets (/ᵐb/, /ⁿd/, and /ᵑɡ/). The velar nasal (ŋ) sound occurs in both syllable initial and syllable final positions. There is a tendency toward denasalization for initial /ŋ/ as in 耳 /ŋi/ [ŋɡi] 'ear', 飲/饮 /ŋim/ [ŋɡim] 'to drink'，魚 /ŋuy/ [ŋɡui] 'fish' and 月 /ŋut/ [ŋɡut] 'moon'. In words like 牙 /ŋa/ 'tooth' and 我 /ŋoy/ 'I; me', denasalization does not seem to take place. In syllable final position following the rounded vowel [o], /ŋ/ is usually modified by lip-rounding. Examples are: 東 /uŋ/ 'east' and 紅 /huŋ/ 'red'.
2. The palatal sibilants (/t͡ɕ/, /t͡ɕʰ/, and /ɕ/) are allophones of the respective alveolar sibilants (/t͡s/, /t͡sʰ/, and /s/) when the first vowel of the final consonant is high (/i/ and /u/).
3. The palatal approximant (/j/) is an allophone of the voiced fricative sibilant initial (/ʒ/).
4. The palatal approximant (/j/) can be a semivowel of the vowel /i/ when used as a glide.
5. The labial-velar approximant (/w/) can be a semivowel of the vowel /u/ when used as a glide.

=== Vowels ===
There are about seven different vowels in Taishanese:

	Front	Central	Back
Close	/i/^{1}		/u/^{2}
Close-Mid	/e/	/ə/^{3}	
Open-Mid	/ɛ/	/ə/^{3}	/ɔ/
Open	/a/		

1. The closed front vowel (/i/) can be a palatal approximant ([j]) as a semivowel.
2. The closed back vowel (/u/) can be a labial-velar approximant ([w]) as a semivowel.
3. The rounding of the schwa /ə/ is variable.

=== Final consonants ===
The final consonant (or rime) occurs after the initial sound, which consists of a medial, a nucleus, and a coda. There are three medial (or glides) in Taishanese that occur after the initial sound: null or no medial, /i/, or /u/. There are five main vowels after the medial: /a/, /e/, /i/, /u/, and null or no vowel. There are nine main codas at the end of the final: null or no coda, /i/, /u/, /m/, /n/, /ŋ/, /p/, /t/, and /k/.

Nucleus		-a-			-e-	-ɵ~ə-	-i-	-u-	-∅-
Medial		∅-	i-	u-	∅-	∅	∅-	∅-	∅-
Coda	-∅	[a]	[iɛ]	[uɔ]			[i]	[u]	
Coda	-i	[ai]		[uɔi]	[ei]			[ui]	
Coda	-u	[au]	[iau]		[eu]		[iu]		
Coda	-m	[am]	[iam]		[em]		[im]		[m]
Coda	-n	[an]		[uɔn]	[en]		[in]	[un]	
Coda	-ŋ	[aŋ]	[iaŋ]	[ɔŋ]		[ɵŋ] ~ [əŋ]			
Coda	-p	[ap]	[iap]		[ep]		[ip]		
Coda	-t	[at]		[uɔt]	[et]	[ɵt] ~ [ət]	[it]	[ut]	
Coda	-k	[ak]	[iak]	[ɔk]		[ɵk] ~ [ək]			

== Tones ==
Taishanese is tonal. There are five contrastive lexical tones: high, mid, low, mid falling, and low falling. In at least one Taishanese dialect, that of Doushan (斗山), the two falling tones have merged into the low falling tone. There is no tone sandhi.

Tone	Chao number	Tone letter	Example	Changed tone variant	Gene Chin diacritic	DLI diacritic	Counting tone method	Jyutping equivalent
high level (yin shang)	55	˥	hau^{55} or hau˥, 口 (mouth)	-	hēo	heo	1	1
mid level (yin ping)	33	˧	hau^{33} or hau˧, 偷 (to steal)	335 or ˧˥	hëo	hèo	3	3
low level (yang ping)	22 or 11	˨ or ˩	hau^{22} or hau˨, 頭 (head)	225 or ˨˥	hẽo	hēo	0	6
mid falling (yang qu)	31	˧˩	hau^{31} or hau˧˩, 皓 (bright)	325 or ˧˨˥	hèo	hêo	2	Higher 4
low falling (yang shang)	21	˨˩	hau^{21} or hau˨˩, 厚 (thick)	215 or ˨˩˥	hêo	hẹ̄o	5	4

=== Changed tones ===
Taishanese has four changed tones: mid rising, low rising, mid dipping and low dipping. These tones are called changed tones because they are the product of morphological processes (e.g. pluralization of pronouns) on four of the lexical tones. These tones have been analyzed as the addition of a high floating tone to the end of the mid, low, mid falling and low falling tones. The high endpoint of the changed tone often reaches an even higher pitch than the level high tone; this fact has led to the proposal of an expanded number of pitch levels for Taishanese tones. The changed tone can change the meaning of a word, and this distinguishes the changed tones from tone sandhi, which does not change a word's meaning. An example of a changed tone contrast is 刷 /tʃat˧/ (to brush) and 刷 /tʃat˨˩˥/ (a brush).

=== Historical development ===
Taishanese underwent several significant tonal mergers and shifts from the Middle Chinese tonal system. As in many Yue varieties, the historical checked tones remained distinct from the unchecked tones because of their final stop consonants. All the Middle Chinese categories first underwent an 陰陽 (yīn-yáng) split, conditioned by the voicing of the initial consonant. The 陰入 (yīnrù) category subsequently underwent a further tonal split, resulting in three distinct checked-tone categories in Taishanese. As in Standard Cantonese, this secondary split was conditioned by historical vowel length: checked syllables with shorter vowels developed a higher pitch, while those with longer vowels developed a lower pitch. However, not all readings agree across the two varieties; for example, 法 is in the 上陰入 (shàng yīnrù) tone category in Taishanese (IPA: /fat55/), but belongs to the 下陰入 (xià yīnrù) category in Cantonese.

In 19th century accounts of Taishanese, a further 下下入 (xià xiàrù) category, a lower version of 陽入 (yángrù), is described. This seems to be related principally to onomatopoeia, with most characters in this tone category having readings in other categories. In a more recent example, 月 'moon, month' is stated as having two readings, /ᵑgut31/ for most uses of the character and /ᵑgut21/ for the meaning 'a month' or 'this month'. Nonetheless, most descriptions do not treat this as an extra split within the 陽入 (yángrù) tone category.

Common across the Siyi (四邑) dialects, in Taishanese the historical 陰平 (yīnpíng) and 陰去 (yīnqù) categories have merged, resulting in a mid-level 33 tone in Taishan. Historical evidence indicates that it was largely established by the Qing dynasty, with 陰平 apparently shifting toward the existing 陰去 category. For example, the lexemes 衣 'clothing' (historical 陰平 yīnpíng) and 意 'meaning' (historical 陰去 yīnqù) are both pronounced /ʒi33/.

Tone name		Level píng 平	Rising shǎng 上	Departing qù 去	Entering rù 入
Upper/Dark yīn 陰	上 shàng	˧ (33)	˥ (55)	˧ (33)	˥ (5)
Upper/Dark yīn 陰	下 xià	˧ (33)	˥ (55)	˧ (33)	˧ (3)
Lower/Light yáng 陽	上 shàng	˨ or ˩ (22 or 11)	˨˩ (21)	˧˨ or ˧˩ (32 or 31)	˧˨ or ˧˩ (32 or 31)
Lower/Light yáng 陽	下 xià	˨ or ˩ (22 or 11)	˨˩ (21)	˧˨ or ˧˩ (32 or 31)	˨˩ (21) (disputed)

== Writing system ==
The writing system is Chinese. Historically, the common written language of Classical Literary Chinese united and facilitated cross-dialect exchange in dynastic China, as opposed to the spoken dialects which were too different to be mutually intelligible. In the 20th century, standard written Chinese, based on Mandarin, was codified as the new written standard. As Taishanese is primarily used in speech, characters needed specifically for writing Taishanese are not standardized and may vary. Commonly seen alternatives are shown below.

The sound represented by the IPA symbol ⟨ɬ⟩ (the voiceless alveolar lateral fricative) is particularly challenging, as it has no standard romanization. The digraph "lh" used above to represent this sound is used in Totonac, Chickasaw and Choctaw, which are among several written representations in the languages that include the sound. The alternative "hl" is used in Xhosa and Zulu, while "ll" is used in Welsh. Other written forms occur as well. Influenced by the natives of Baiyue, typically present in modern day Tai-Kadai, particularly the Zhuang ethnic group, many Cantonese varieties in Guangxi and western Guangdong retained the ⟨ɬ⟩ sound.

The following chart compares the personal pronouns among Taishanese, Cantonese, and Mandarin. In Taishanese, the plural forms of the pronouns are formed by changing the tone, whereas in Cantonese and Mandarin, a plural marker (地/哋/等 dei6 and 们/們 men, respectively) is added.

	Singular			Plural		
	Taishanese	Standard Cantonese	Mandarin	Taishanese	Standard Cantonese	Mandarin
1st person	我 ngöi [ŋɔɪ˧]	我 ngo5	我 wǒ	哦/偔/呆 ngo̖i [ŋɔɪ˨˩]	我 哋 ngo5 dei6	我们/我們 wǒmen
2nd person	你 nï [nɪ˧]	你 nei5	你 nǐ	偌/逽/聶 nie̖k [nɪɛk˨˩]	你 哋 nei5 dei6	你们/你們 nǐmen
3rd person	佢 küi [kʰuɪ˧]	佢 keoi5	他 tā	㑢/𠳞/佉/劇 kie̖k [kʰɪɛk˨˩]	佢 哋 keoi5 dei6	他们/他們 tāmen

== See also ==
- Varieties of Chinese
- Cantonese culture
