= Yayao, Jiangmen =

Yayao 雅瑶
- Town
- 雅瑶镇
- Location within Guangdong
- Coordinates: 22.703°N 113.013°E
- Country: China
- Province: Guangdong
- Prefecture-level city: Jiangmen
- County-level city: Heshan

Area
  - Total: 82.3 km^{2} (31.8 sq mi)

Population (2020)
  - Total: 34,208
  - Density: 416/km^{2} (1,080/sq mi)
- Time zone: UTC+8 (China Standard)
- Postal code: 529724

Yayao (Chinese: 雅瑶; pinyin: Yǎyáo; Jyutping: ngaa^{5}jiu^{4}) is a town in Guangdong province in Southern China. It is under the jurisdiction of Heshan City.

== Administration ==
Yayao town administers three residential communities and ten rural villages.

== Notable people ==
- Li Tiefu (1869 - 1952), Chinese painter and revolutionary
- Loke Yew CMG (1845 - 1917), Malayan business magnate
