= Heshan =

Heshan may refer to the following places in China:

== County-level ==
- Heshan, Guangdong (鹤山市), county-level city of Jiangmen
- Heshan, Guangxi (合山市), county-level city of Laibin
- Heshan District, Hebi (鹤山区), Henan
- Heshan District, Yiyang (赫山区), Hunan

== Towns ==
- Heshan, Yangdong County (合山镇), Guangdong
- Heshan, Ningyang County (鹤山镇), Shandong
- Heshan, Rizhao (河山镇), in Donggang District, Rizhao, Shandong
- Heshan, Tongxiang (河山镇), Zhejiang

== Subdistricts ==
- Heshan Subdistrict, Yiyang (赫山街道), a subdistrict of Heshan District, Yiyang, Hunan
- Heshan Subdistrict, Xiamen (禾山街道), a subdistrict of Huli District in Xiamen, Fujian
- Heshan Subdistrict, Pujiang (鹤山街道), a subdistrict in Pujiang County, Sichuan

== Village ==
- Heshan, Liuji (合山村), Liuji, Dawu County, Xiaogan, Hubei
