= Qiu Ersao =

Chinese rebel leader (1822–1853)

- 邱二嫂
- Born: 1822; Guixian County, Guangxi province, Qing dynasty
- Died: 1853 (aged 30–31)
- Military career
- Allegiance: Red Turban; Taiping Heavenly Kingdom
- Rank: Commander
- Commands: Taiping army
- Conflicts: Red Turban Rebellion; Taiping Rebellion

Qiu Ersao (Chinese: 邱二嫂; pinyin: Qiū Èrsǎo. 1822 – 1853), was a Chinese rebel and military commander during the Taiping Rebellion. Originally a religious leader within the Tiandihui, she later had 500 female soldiers under her command.

== Biography ==
Born in Qiaoxu, Guixian County, Guangxi Province, her husband was an opium addict, so she was in charge of supporting her family, preparing and selling sweets in the local market. Tired of corruption and abuse by the authorities, in the fall of 1849 she joined the Red Turban Rebellion (1854–1856) and learned martial arts. In 1850 she joined the Taiping Rebellion and, along with Su Sanniang, commanded the rebellion's female troops. Qiu Ersao decorated her sword with red pompoms. As a combatant, she stood out as a speaker. She died in a confrontation with a local militia in the fall of 1853, when she fell from her horse after being struck by enemy fire.
