= Li Tiefu =

Chinese painter and artist

- 李鐵夫
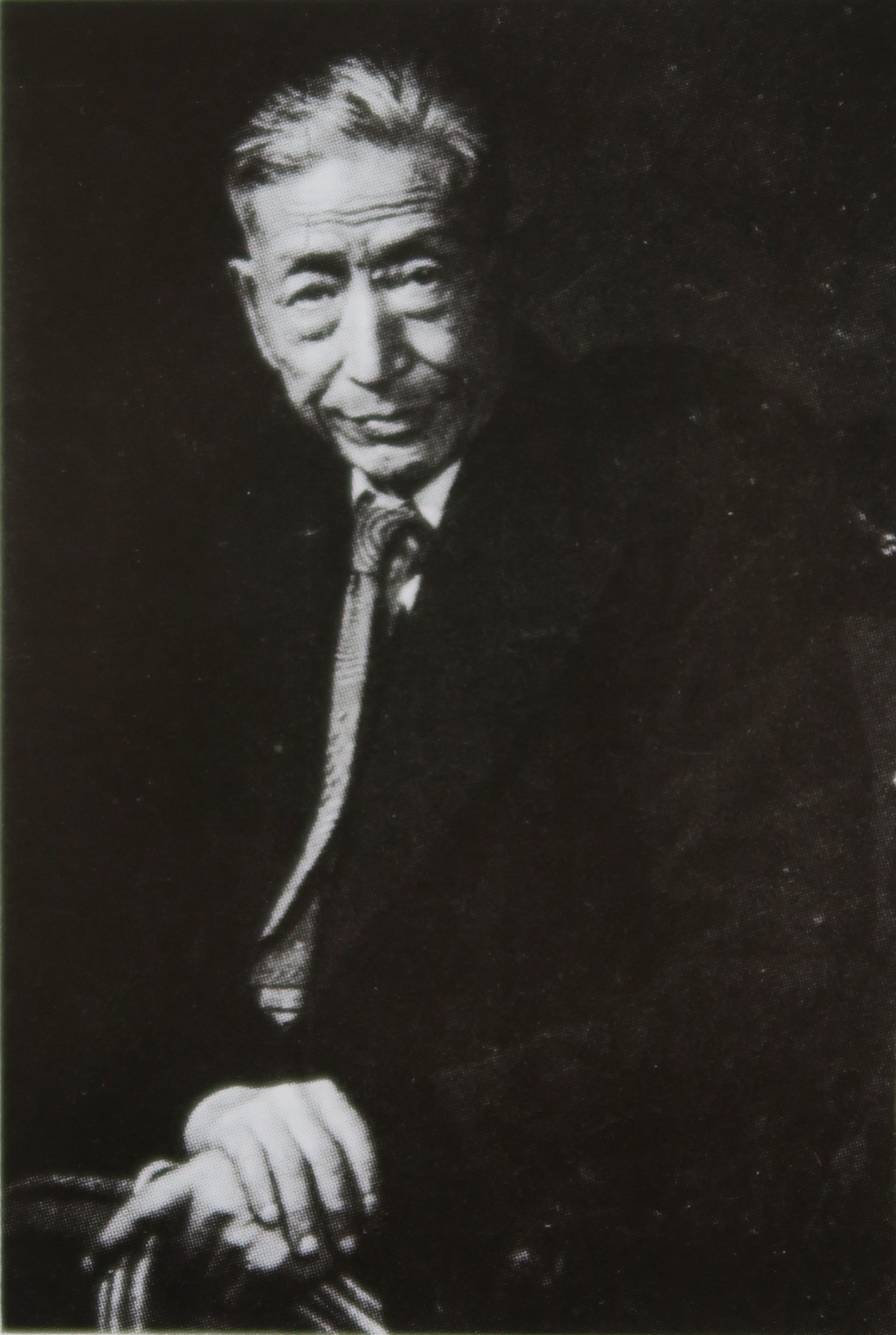
- Born: Li Yutian (李玉田); October 1869; Yayao County, Guangdong, Great Qing
- Died: 16 June 1952 (aged 82)
- Known for: Oil Painting, Sculpture, Calligraphy
- Notable work: Unfinished Portrait of an Old Man; Bullfighter; The Revoluntary Cai Tingrui; The Musician; Fish and Aubergine

Li Tiefu
- Traditional Chinese: 李鐵夫
- Simplified Chinese: 李铁夫
Transcriptions
Standard Mandarin
- Hanyu Pinyin: Lǐ Tiěfū

Li Tiefu (October 1869 – 16 June 1952) was a Chinese painter, sculptor, calligrapher and revolutionary, known for introducing western oil painting to China and for assisting Sun Yat-sen in funding the Xinhai revolution and overthrowing the Qing Dynasty. During his time in New York, he was a member of the National Academy of Design (now known as the National Academy Museum and School). Li Tiefu was hailed as one of the most important Cantonese artists of the 20th century at the Guangdong Art Centennial Exhibition.

== Gallery ==
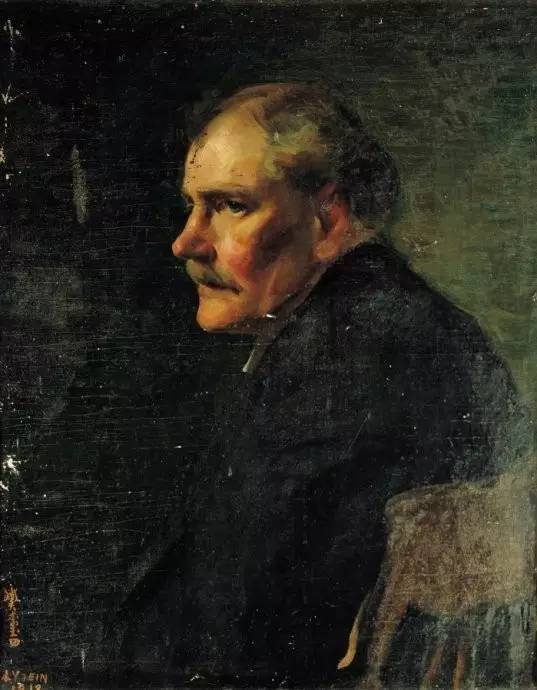
The Musician (1918)

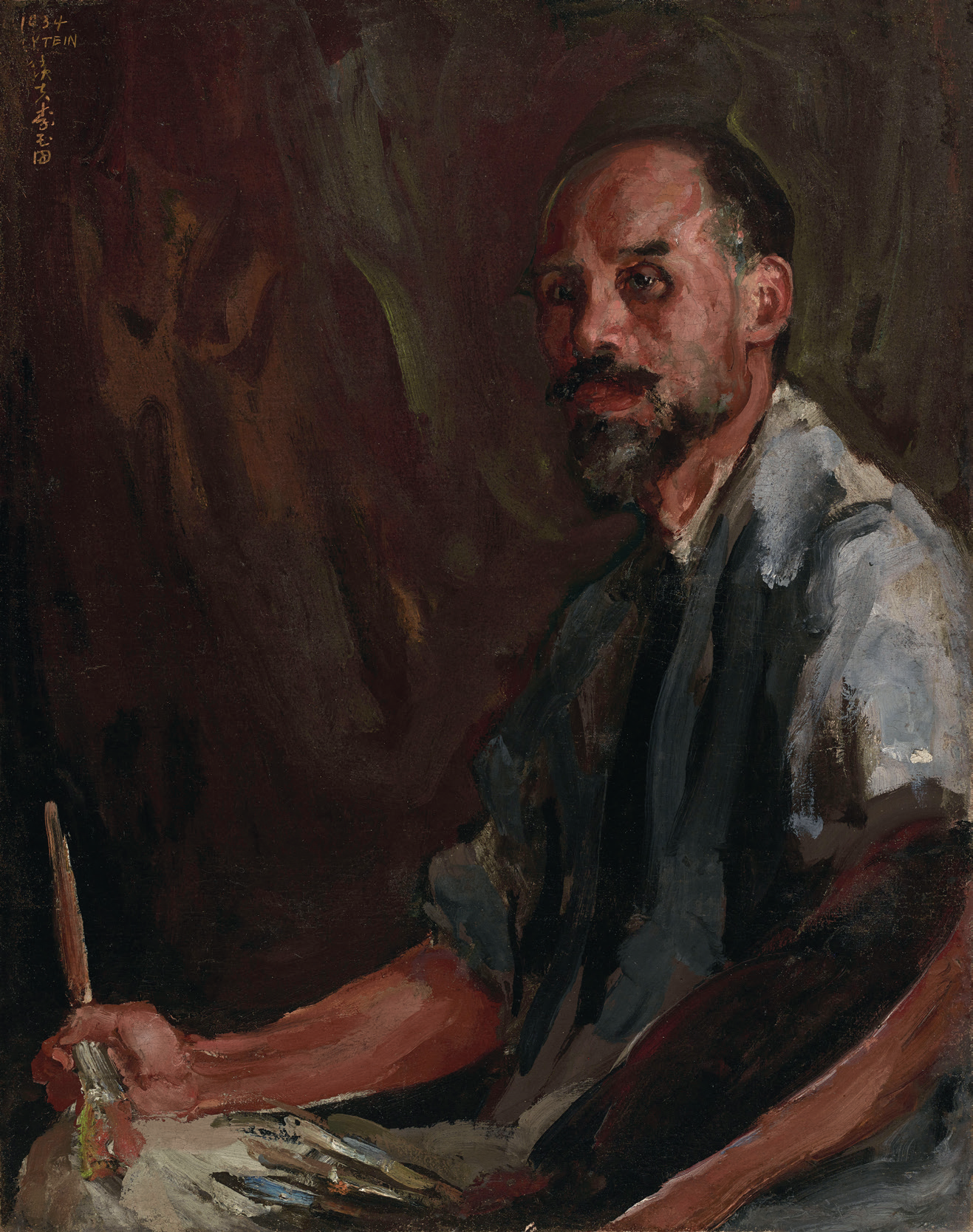
Painter Feng Gangbai (1934)

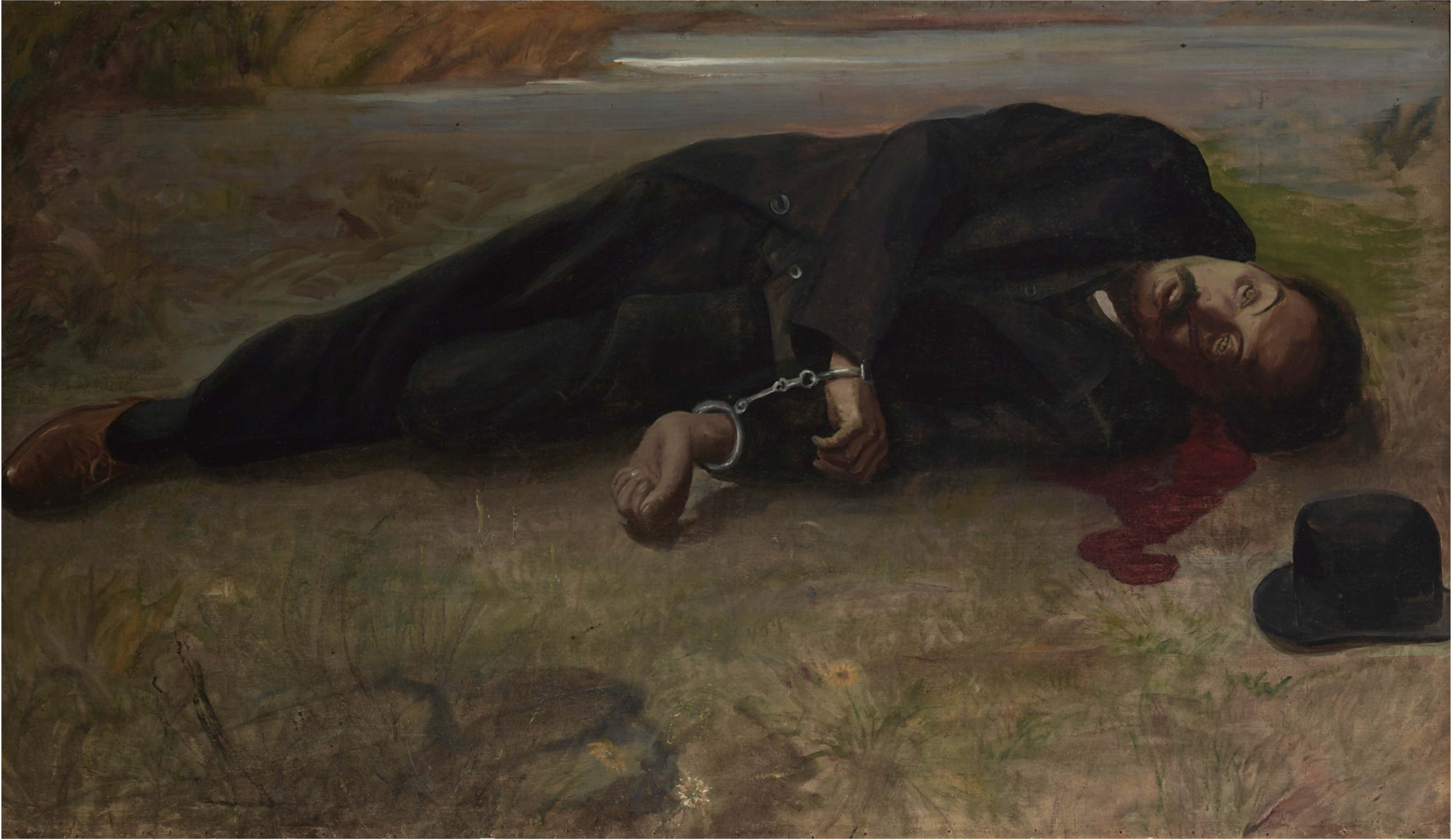
The Revoluntary Cai Tingrui's Sacrifice (1946)

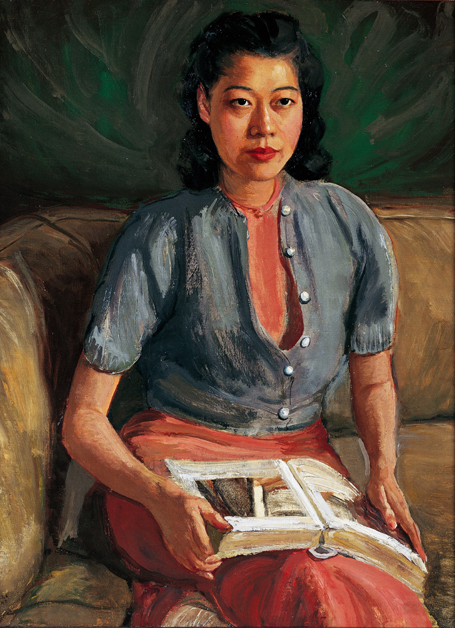
Portrait of Liu Suwei (1942)

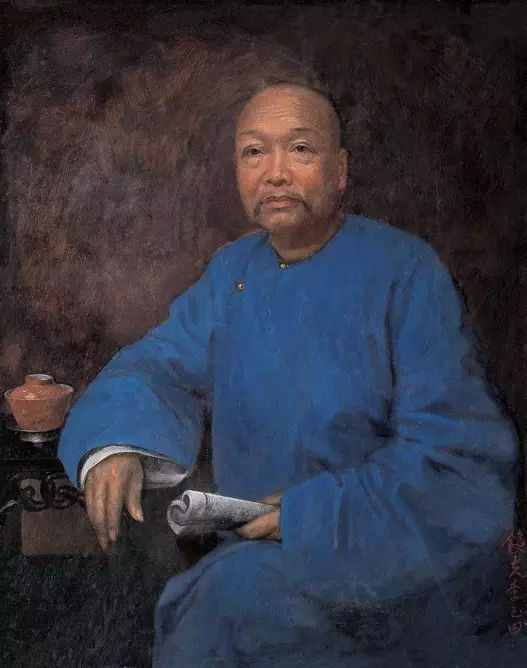
Portrait of Kang Youwei (1904)

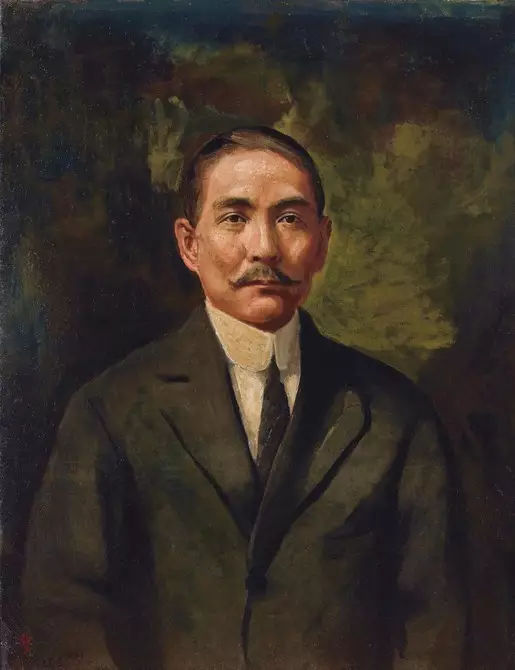
Portrait of Sun Yat-sen (1921)

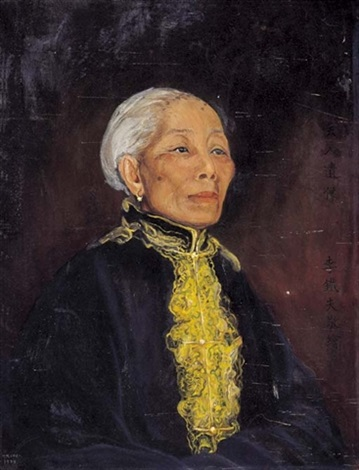
Portrait of Madame Liu (1942)

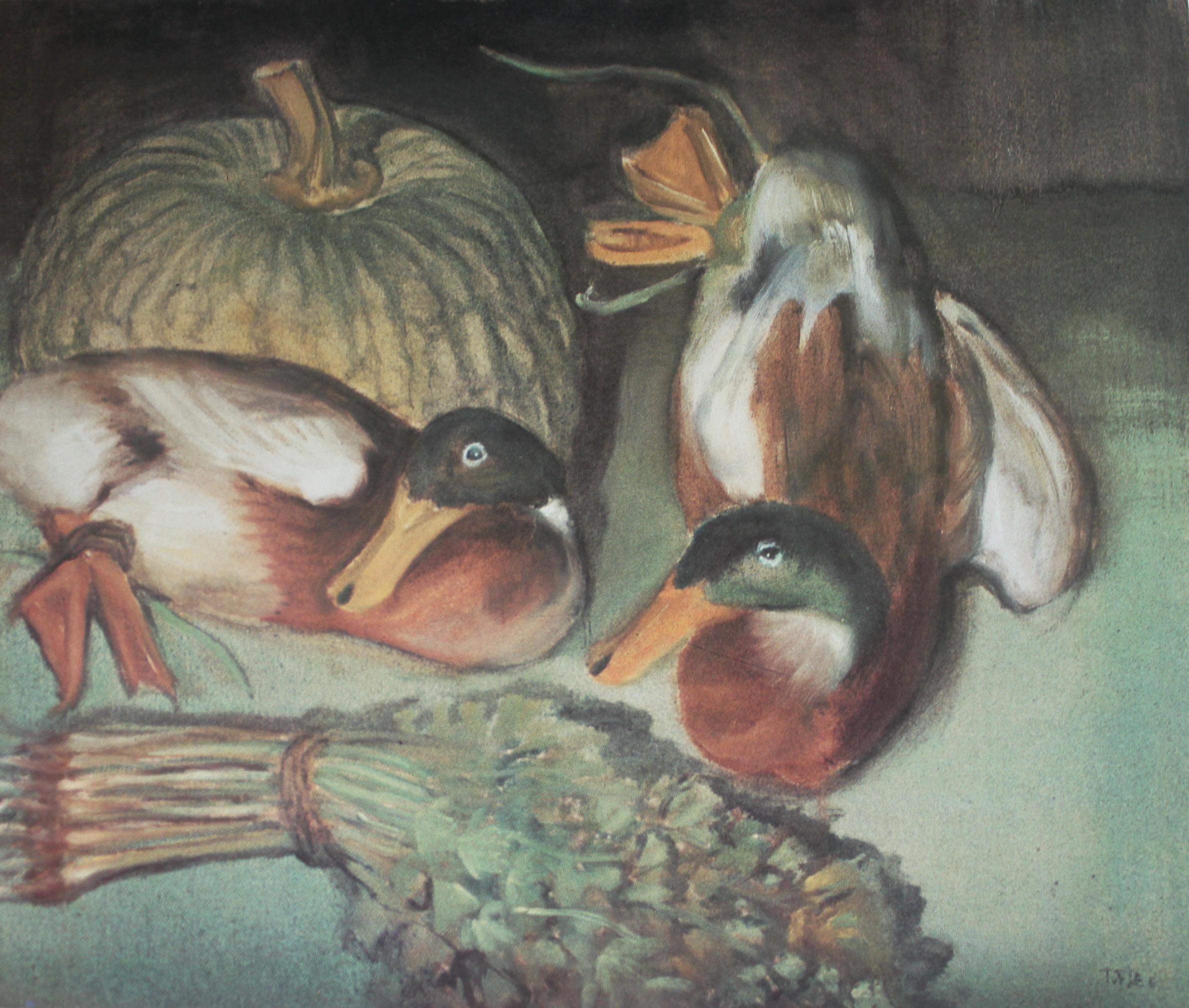
Two Ducks

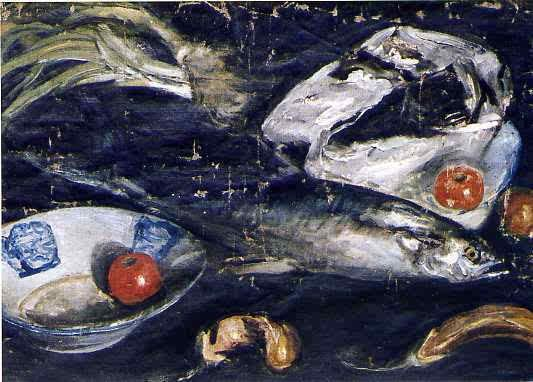
Fish and Aubergine (1940)

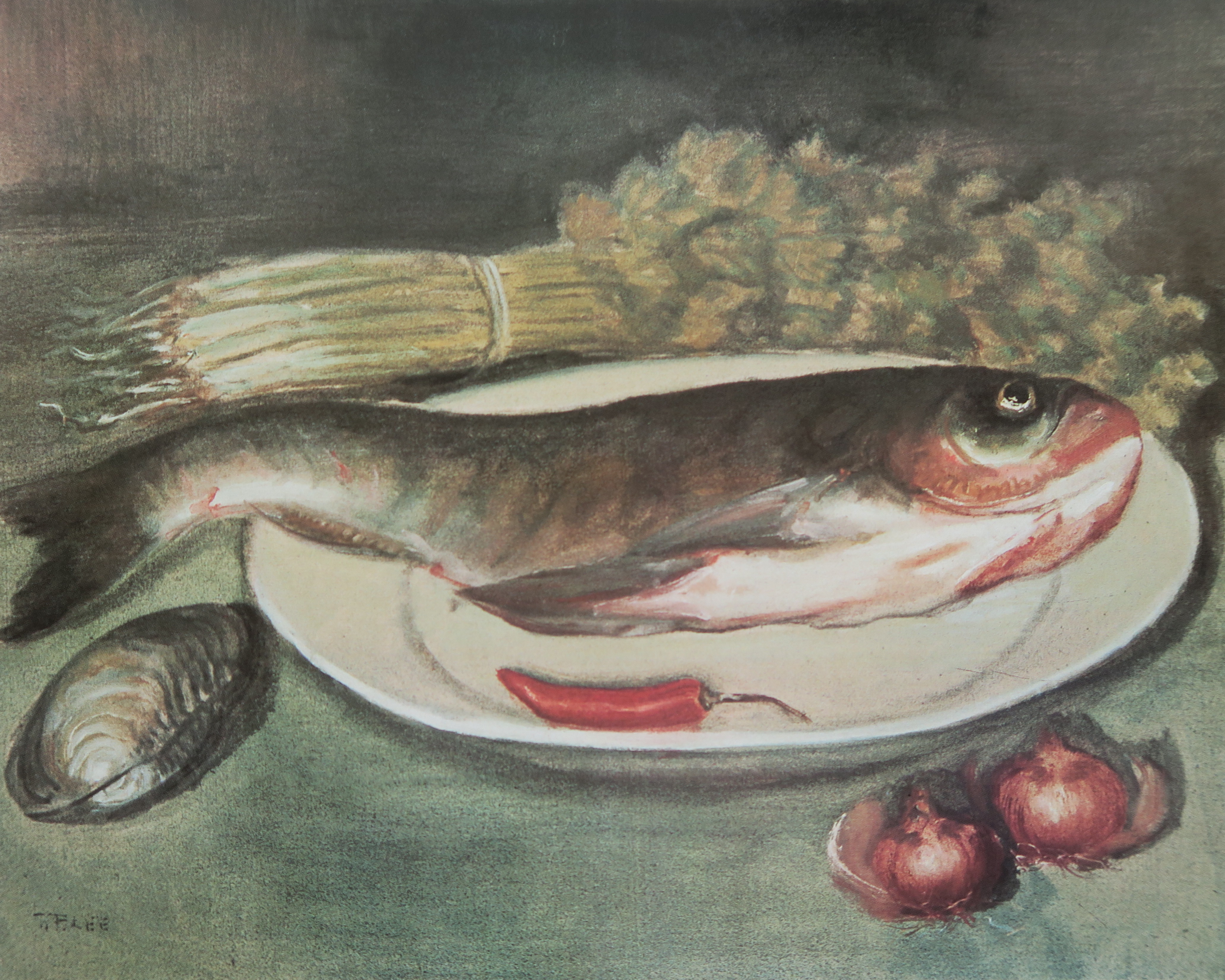
Fish and Celery

Raw Fish and Shrimp

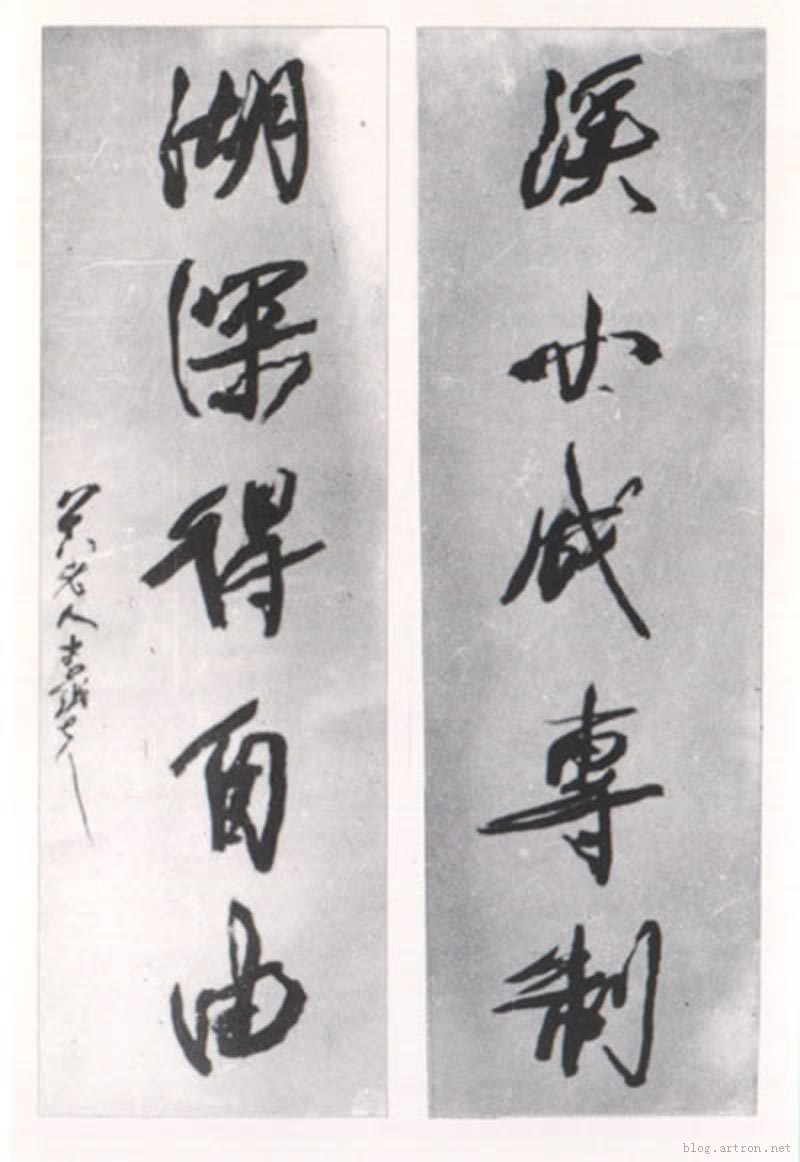
Calligraphy by Li Tiefu
