= Katherine Sui Fun Cheung =

Aviator

Katherine Cheung
- Image of Cheung in 1936
- Born: Katherine Sui Fun Cheung; December 12, 1904; Enping, Guangdong, Qing Empire
- Died: September 2, 2003 (aged 98); Thousand Oaks, California
- Resting place: Forest Lawn Hollywood Hills
- Education: Los Angeles Conservatory of Music
- Known for: first Chinese woman to receive a pilot's license/Chinese-American woman to receive a commercial flying license in the United States
- Aviation career
- Flight license: 30 March 1932

Katherine Sui Fun Cheung (simplified Chinese: 张瑞芬; traditional Chinese: 張瑞芬; pinyin: Zhāng Ruìfēn; Jyutping: Zoeng1 Seoi6fan1; 1904–2003) was a Chinese aviator. She received one of the first private licenses issued to a Chinese woman and was the first Chinese woman to obtain an international flying license. She became an American citizen after obtaining her license.

== Early life ==
Sui Fun Cheung was born on 12 December 1904 in Enping, Guangdong province, China to Tsing Lan Nip (Chinese: 聶清蘭) and Sheun Ping Cheung (Chinese: 張舜炳). Her mother had been a student at the Paxian Bible School in Guangzhou (formerly known as Canton) and her father was a businessman who interacted with the overseas Chinese community in the United States. Her mother took her to Guangzhou when she was a child and she completed her primary education at the Guangzhou True Light Middle School. She attended the Guangzhou City Peidao Women's High School (zh-yue), graduating in 1921 when she passed the Ministry of Education's examination.

Upon her graduation, she obtained a passport and at the age of seventeen moved to the United States to study music at several institutions, including the Los Angeles Conservatory of Music, California State Polytechnic University, Pomona, and the University of Southern California (USC). Her father, who was a produce buyer, came with her and would take her to Dycer Airport in Los Angeles to practice driving a car. Cheung was fascinated with the airplanes and wanted to learn to fly. After three years of studying piano at USC, she quit school and married her father's business partner, George Young, keeping her own name, but Americanizing it to Katherine Cheung. By 1931, she had two daughters, Doris and Dorothy and was determined to take up flying. In a letter from a friend back in China, she was informed that Chinese flying schools would not allow women to enroll, which was not unusual; in the United States at that time only 1% of licensed pilots were women.

== Aviation training ==
In 1931, Cheung enrolled in aviation classes, taking flying lessons with the Chinese Aeronautical Association in Los Angeles with flight instructor Bert Ekstein. On 30 March 1932 she received her private pilot's license and made plans to return within a few weeks to China. She was widely reported as the first Chinese woman to earn a license in the United States, or having earned a commercial license, while other papers acknowledged that she was one of two Chinese women pilots. After attaining her license, she continued to study, often with military pilots to learn aerobatics, aircraft structures, international routing, navigation and other aviation skills.

Almost as soon as she was licensed, Cheung performed at fairs and air shows along the California coast, performing barrel rolls, inverted flying, loops and other aerobatic tricks. Her performances were thrilling to the Chinese American community and they took up a collection to get her a plane to use. Anna May Wong and other ethnic Chinese spent $2,000 to secure a 125-horsepower Fleet biplane for Cheung. She competed in several racing events, like the Los Angeles Women's Championship (1935) and Chatterton Air Race (1936).

In 1935 Cheung joined the Ninety Nines club for women pilots, an association founded by Amelia Earhart. That same year, she obtained her international flight license, allowing her to participate in commercial flying, and it was claimed that she was the first commercial Chinese woman pilot. In 1936, Cheung became a United States citizen, but still harbored dreams of returning to China to work for the Chinese government and teach aviation. She believed that the possibilities for developing air services were boundless and recognized the potential of air service to areas which did not have adequate infrastructure to meet transportation needs.

Following the Japanese invasion of China in 1937, Cheung decided to return to China and open a flying school. She toured Chinese American communities and raised money for the venture, securing $7,000. She purchased a Ryan ST-A, but her cousin was killed while testing the plane. Cheung's father, worried about Katherine's safety, made her promise to give up flying. While she continued for a few years, the loss of her friend Earhart, her cousin, and her father, coupled with her brother's death in China in 1942, finally convinced her to give up flying, as she was then the sole support for her mother.

During World War II, she became a flight instructor in the United States and when the war ended, she bought a flower shop, which she operated until her retirement in 1970. In 1989, Cheung, one of her daughters and a son-in-law returned to China to visit Enping. Their vacation brought much media attention, as she was feted by various associations, the local government, and the aviation industry. Until the 1990s, she lived in Chinatown, before relocating to Thousand Oaks, California, where she would remain until her death. On 4 March 2001, Lan Hua Jun, the Chinese Consul General of Los Angeles, presented Cheung with a medal on behalf of the Chinese government for her contributions as an aviation pioneer. The ceremony was held in conjunction with her induction into the International Women in Aviation's Pioneer Hall of Fame.

== Death and legacy ==
Cheung died at age 98 on 2 September 2003 and was buried at Forest Lawn Memorial Park in Hollywood Hills. She has been recognized with a display at the Aviation Museum in Enping and the Beijing Air Force Aviation Museum in China. Cheung has been recognized by the Smithsonian's National Air and Space Museum as the "First Asian American Aviatrix" and Flight Path Walk of Fame in Los Angeles has honored her with a bronze plaque bearing her name. In addition to other awards and recognition, she was the subject of a 2016 documentary entitled Aviatrix: The Katherine Sui Fun Cheung Story. In 2017, Cheung was honored with a new statue in her home village in Enping, China. She was also featured in a six-minute documentary segment for Chinese TV in 2019. In 2021, students from the University of California Jovrnalism program created a VR 360 video documentary about Cheung, along with launching a dedicated webpage that shares her story in detail. In 2022, the New York based Museum of Chinese in America, added a Cheung collection to their archives. The collection includes donated family scrapbooks and digital assets.

== See also ==
- Ninety-Nines (International Organization of Women Pilots)

== Bibliography ==
- Aldrich, Nancy (September 12, 2013). "Katherine Sui Fun Cheung". 20th Century Aviation Magazine. Lakeland, Florida. Archived from the original on 17 October 2016.
- Chen, Ya-chen (2014). New Modern Chinese Women and Gender Politics: The Centennial of the End of the Qing Dynasty. Taylor & Francis. ISBN 978-1-135-02005-7.
- Driscoll, Marjorie C. (April 1936). "She Will Wing Over China". Popular Aviation. 18. Chicago, Illinois: Ziff-Davis Publishing Company: 249, 284.
- Gibson, Karen Bush (2013). Women Aviators: 26 Stories of Pioneer Flights, Daring Missions, and Record-Setting Journeys. Chicago, Illinois: Chicago Review Press. p. 79. ISBN 978-1-61374-543-4.
- 林(Lin), 天宏 (Tianhong) (7 July 2010). "张瑞芬：闯入美军禁区的中国女人" [Zhang Ruifen: Chinese woman went into the US military restricted area] (in Chinese). Beijing, China: China Youth Daily. Archived from the original on 11 July 2010.
- Ma, Yuxin (2010). Women Journalists and Feminism in China, 1898-1937. Amherst, New York: Cambria Press. ISBN 978-1-60497-660-1.
- Nile, Lauren Joichin (2014). RACE: My Story & Humanity's Bottom Line: More than a Book.......It's an Experience. Bloomington, Indiana: iUniverse. ISBN 978-1-4917-0309-0.
- Rasmussen, Cecilia (April 12, 1998). "'China's Amelia Earhart' Got Her Wings Here". The Los Angeles Times. Los Angeles, California. Archived from the original on 28 August 2016.
- Woo, Elaine (September 7, 2003). "Katherine Cheung, 98; Immigrant Was Nation's First Licensed Asian American Woman Pilot". The Los Angeles Times. Los Angeles, California. Archived from the original on 24 June 2016.
- Zhao, Xiaojian (2002). Remaking Chinese America: Immigration, Family, and Community, 1940-1965. New Brunswick, New Jersey: Rutgers University Press. ISBN 978-0-8135-3011-6.
- "中国航空女英雄—张瑞芬" [China's Aviation heroine—Zhang Ruifen]. epjyw.com (in Chinese). Enping, China: Jun Tang Enping Central Primary School. 2013. Archived from the original on 3 April 2016.
- "Chinese Aviatrix". Oakland, California: The Oakland Tribune. March 31, 1932. p. 35 – via Newspapers.com.
- "通用航空信息(article reproduced from 西西河)" [General Aviation Information (article reproduced from Xixi River)]. Chenwei (in Chinese). Memphis, Tennessee. 16 February 2011. Archived from the original on 5 March 2016.
- "Miss China Goes Aloft". San Bernardino, California: The San Bernardino County Sun. April 12, 1932. p. 6 – via Newspapers.com.
- "Plane presented to Chinese girl". Santa Cruz, California: The Santa Cruz Sentinel. November 8, 1935. p. 4 – via Newspapers.com.
- "She's First Chinese Aviatrix". Santa Cruz, California: The Santa Cruz Evening News. April 2, 1932. p. 1 – via Newspapers.com.
- "Young Miss China Sprouts Wings". Uniontown, Pennsylvania: The Morning Herald. April 8, 1932. p. 12 – via Newspapers.com.
- "张瑞芬" [Zhang Ruifen]. Danganju.Enping.gov.cn (in Chinese). Enping, China: Enping City Hall archives compound. 13 August 2007. Archived from the original on 30 October 2010.
