= Enping financial crisis =

Chinese financial crisis

The Enping financial crisis occurred in Enping, Jiangmen, Guangdong in China. This financial crisis refers to the localized financial risk events in Enping in the 1990s. At the height of the situation, there were two serious bank runs in June 1995 and August 1996, which at one time led to financial paralysis in the entire province of Guangdong.

== Backstories ==
In the early stage of reform and opening up, Guangdong Province, as the frontier of opening up, had once experienced rapid economic development. The State Council introduced many preferential policies for Guangdong's economic development, but this also led to the unorganized development of finance in Guangdong, and a large number of debt crises and financial incidents began to appear. In 1990s, Guangdong Province experienced problems of economic overheating and bubble expansion. The high-speed flow of capital was accompanied by the phenomenon of a large number of loans being repaid by borrowing, meanwhile the incidence of financial crimes had also increased.

Beginning in 1992, mainland China began to be keen on building development zones, investing in real estate, investing in stocks and capital-raising, and, in terms of economic indicators, was keen on raising fixed-asset investment, increasing credit investment, increasing currency issuance and stimulating inflation, while the phenomena of indiscriminate capital-raising, indiscriminate borrowing and indiscriminate establishment of financial institutions appeared in the economic order.

== Fraud ==
Local officials, as well as the bank managers at the local China Construction Bank (CCB) branch, had illegally allocated funds to their own projects. Other banks involved included the other three of the "big four" Chinese banks: the Bank of China, the Industrial and Commercial Bank of China, and the Agricultural Bank of China. The banks lost US$509.5m (CN¥ 3.6 billion (US$509m) and HK$3.68 million (around US$0.5m)) due to the fraud, with the CCB branch alone estimated to have lost US$480m.

== Aftermath ==
Losses incurred by the scandal cost the People's Bank of China (PBOC) RMB 6.8b. As banks pulled out of Enping, residents were denied access to financial services into the early 2010s.
