= Peter T. Poon =

Peter T Poon is a scientist at the Jet Propulsion Laboratory (JPL) of the California Institute of Technology (Caltech), operating for NASA. He had spent 35 plus years in science and space technology. A graduate of Hong Kong University majoring in Physics and Mathematics, in 1965, Poon completed his PhD degree at the University of Southern California. He subsequently also pursued advanced training in the Advanced Project Management Program at Stanford University.

Poon made significant contributions towards mission success in NASA projects including Voyager Interstellar Mission to the outer planets and Cassini-Huygens Mission to Saturn and Titan. He was a Telecommunications manager on the Mars Exploration Rovers Spirit & Opportunity, Mars Odyssey, Mars Global Surveyor, Ulysses Mission to the Sun and joint projects with the French and German Space Operations Center.

In 2009, Poon is recognized by the Hong Kong University as a Distinguished Science Alumnus during the 70th anniversary celebration of Hong Kong U Science Faculty. He is profiled in Marquis Who's Who in America, Marquis Who's Who in the World, Marquis Who's Who in Science and Engineering and Chinese American Who's Who in USA.
