= Punti–Hakka Clan Wars =

Mid-19th century conflict in Guangdong, China

- Date: 1855–1868
- Location: Guangdong and the Pearl River Delta, particularly in Taishan and Sze Yup
- Caused by: Red Turban Rebellion (1854–1856)
- Result: Significant Hakka population moved to Guangxi, as well as emigration to other parts of the world

Parties
Hakka people	Cantonese people (Punti)

Casualties
- Deaths: 500,000–1 million+

The Punti–Hakka Clan Wars were an ethnic conflict between the Hakka and the Cantonese, both Han Chinese subgroups, fought largely in the Guangdong region of China which was then under the Qing Empire. Occurring between 1855 and 1868, the fighting was most intense in the Pearl River Delta, especially in Toi Shan of the Sze Yup counties. The wars resulted in up to one million deaths and the displacement of many more civilians.

Punti–Hakka Clan Wars
- Traditional Chinese: 土客械鬥
- Simplified Chinese: 土客械斗
Transcriptions
Standard Mandarin
- Hanyu Pinyin: Tǔkè Xièdòu
Hakka
- Pha̍k-fa-sṳ: Thú hak hái-teu
Yue: Cantonese
- Jyutping: Tou2 haak3 haai6 dau3

== Background ==
The origin of the ethnic group Punti (Chinese: 本地; Jyutping: bun2 dei6; Pha̍k-fa-sṳ: Pún-thi) literally means "natives" while Hakka (客家; haak3 gaa1; Hak-kâ) literally means "guest family". The Punti are also referred to by the language they speak, Yue Chinese. The origins of the conflict lay in resentment of the Cantonese (Punti is a Cantonese endonym of the Cantonese people) towards the Hakka people, whose dramatic population growth threatened the Cantonese. In response, the Hakka were marginalized and resentful, as they were forced to inhabit the hills and waterways, rather than the fertile plains.

The Cantonese-speaking Punti were protective of their fertile lands and so newcomers were pushed to the outer fringes of the fertile plains, or they settled in more mountainous regions. During the 19th century, the tension between the two groups (the Hakkas had by then been settled for several hundred years) led to a series of skirmishes in the Pearl River Delta, known as the Punti–Hakka Clan Wars; The Punti are better known as the Cantonese people today.

During the Qing conquest of the Ming, Ming loyalists under Koxinga established a rump state and a regional office for the Ming dynasty in Taiwan in the ambitions of eventually retaking China proper. In an attempt to defeat Koxinga and his men without war, the Kangxi Emperor strengthened the sea ban (haijin) in 1661 and issued the order for the Great Clearance of the southeastern coast. Han Chinese, especially the ethnic Tanka, who were living off the coast of Shandong to Guangdong were ordered to destroy their property and to move 30 to 50 li (about 16–31 km or 9.9–19.3 mi) inland upon pain of death to deprive the Taiwan-based anti-Qing loyalists of support or targets to raid. The governors and viceroys of the affected provinces submitted scathing memorials, and the policy was reversed after eight years. In 1669 and 1671, however, strong typhoons destroyed what few settlements existed.

As far fewer Punti returned to the abandoned lands than had been expected, the Qing ruler decided to provide incentives to repopulate these areas. The most visible of those who responded were the Hakka. For some time, the Punti and the Hakka lived together peacefully. As the population of Guangdong soared, life became increasingly difficult, and unrest broke out, such as the Red Turban Rebellion, which was led by the Cantonese who attacked Ho Yun and Fat Shan.

== Clan wars ==
During the Red Turban Rebellion in Guangzhou, the Hakkas had helped the imperial army raid Punti villages to kill the rebels and any real or suspected sympathisers, including villagers who had been forced to pay taxes to the Red Turbans. That precipitated open hostility between the Hakka and the Punti, with the Punti attacking Hakka villages in revenge.

Battles raged in which both sides fortified their villages with walls, destroyed bridges and roads, and raised fighting men. The Cantonese were armed with the help of their relatives in British Hong Kong and the Chinese diaspora who lived abroad. Some captives were sold to Cuba and South America as coolies via Hong Kong and Portuguese Macau, and others were sold to the brothels of Macau. Throughout the war, 500,000 perished from fighting in which thousands of villages were destroyed, but an even greater number perished in epidemics. The Punti significantly outnumbered the Hakka, whose losses were therefore more extensive. The population share of Hakka in the Sze Yup area dropped to 3%, with many relocating to Guangxi.

== Aftermath ==
As a result of the wars and widespread violence, many Chinese civilians chose to emigrate during the 19th century, with significant numbers moving to Southeast Asia and North America.

== See also ==
- Lin Shuangwen rebellion, a 1787 Taiwanese revolt against the Qing
