= Red Turban Rebellion (1854–1856) =

Revolt against Qing rule in Guangdong Province, China (1854-56)

- Illustrations depicting the riots near the Guangzhou Red Scarf Uprising
Date	1854–1856
Location	Guangdong province, China
Result	Qing victory: Rebellion suppressed; Start of Hakka-Punti Clan Wars

Belligerents
Qing dynasty	Red Turban rebels

Commanders and leaders
(Qing dynasty) Ye Mingchen (Qing dynasty) Xu Guangjin	Chen Kai (executed); Li Wenmao

Strength
Over 50,000	~100000

Casualties and losses
1 million people in Guangdong were executed (executed)	

The Red Turban Rebellion of 1854–1856 was a rebellion by members of the Tiandihui (Chinese: 天地會, Heaven and Earth Society) in the Guangdong province of South China.

The initial core of the rebels were Tiandihui secret societies that were involved in both revolutionary activity and organised crime, such as prostitution, piracy, and opium smuggling. Many lodges were formed originally for self-defence in feuds between locals and migrants from neighboring provinces. They were organized into scattered local lodges, each under a lodge-master (堂主) and in October 1854 elected Li Wenmao and Chen Kai as joint alliance-masters (盟主).

In Summer 1854, 50,000 outlaws, proclaiming a restoration of the Ming dynasty, captured Qingyuan. That roused the Tiandihui to revolt in the city of Conghua, forty miles northeast of the provincial capital. The Red Turbans were formed by religious members from Tiandihui, such as Qiu Ersao, who joined the Taiping Heavenly Kingdom with thousands more. In September, forces commanded by Taiping-affiliated Ling Shiba captured Luoding and made it their headquarters. Ling Shiba was connected to the Taiping Rebels, as he was also a member of the Taiping God-Worshipping Society.

Viceroy of Guangdong Xu Guangjin (徐廣縉) sent braves (勇, or irregular militia), to the border to deal with the situation, but most of them defected to the rebels. Provincial Governor Ye Mingchen then formulated a strategy of bribing lodge leaders to defect, which was successful in bringing Ling to heel, and the Emperor promoted him to Viceroy. Ye would later be in charge of purging Guangdong of any anti-government outlaw. Over one million people from Guangdong were sentenced to death and executed.

To fund the further defence of the province against the Taiping rebellion, heavy taxes begun to be levied on the population. That resulted in the people becoming alienated, and flooding of the Pearl River added to their economic woes. The Taiping victory in the capture of Nanjing galvanised the Tiandihui to redouble its revolutionary efforts. A group, allied with the Small Swords Society in neighboring Fujian Province, succeeded in seizing the city of Huizhou. The rebel leader He Liu proceeded to capture the city of Dongguan, which was followed by Chen Kai's capture of the major city of Foshan on 4 July 1854.

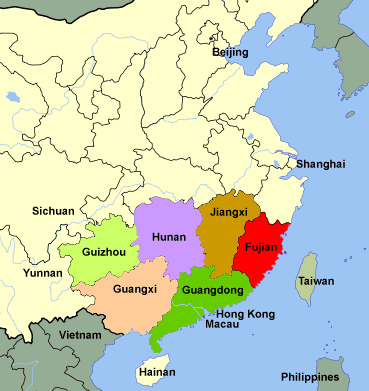
Guangdong province and neighbouring provinces in South China

The Red Turbans did not succeed in taking the city of Guangzhou but fought through much of the country round it for more than a year. Failure to co-ordinate had exhausted the supplies of the rebel alliance, which faltered during the attack on the provincial capital Guangzhou, where the gentry had succeeded in raising a force of militia to defend the city alongside the British Royal Navy, which intervened on the government side.

By 1856, after failing to capture Guangzhou, Red Turban forces, hoping to regroup with the Taiping forces in Nanjing, retreated north, occupied parts of Guangxi province, proclaimed the Dacheng Kingdom, and managed to hold out for nine years. Others fought their way through government-held territory in Hunan province and finally to Jiangxi province, where they coalesced with the Taiping forces of Shi Dakai. Some of them were consolidated as the Flower Flag Force (花旗军) of the Taiping Heavenly Kingdom. Many were crushed en route by the Xiang Army.

== Dacheng phase ==
The rebellion was led by Chen Kai (陳開) and Li Wenmao (李文茂), both of whom were Yue Chinese. They captured several counties and besieged Guangzhou, but the Qing army managed to recover most of the territory. The rebels retreated west to Guangxi and captured Xunzhou (modern-day Guiping) in 1855, renamed it to Xiujing (秀京), and made it their capital.

The Dacheng Kingdom army was joined by the forces of other Yue Chinese rebels such as Huang Dingfeng (黃鼎鳳), Li Wencai (李文彩) and Li Jingui (李錦貴), all of whom had rebelled against the Qing since the 1850s.

Other short-term rebel regimes were established alongside Dacheng, such as the Yanling Kingdom and the Shengping Heavenly Kingdom.

In November 1856, Li Wenmao besieged and captured Liuzhou. In April 1857, Chen Kai captured Wuzhou. They advanced to Yongzhou (now Nanning) and captured the city. In September 1857, the Dacheng Kingdom managed to expand half of Guangxi, an area equal to northern Vietnam, and issued their own currency called Pingjing Shengbao (平靖勝寶).

In 1857, Li Wenmao attacked Guilin. However, the Qing army, commanded by Jiang Yili (蒋益澧) managed to recapture Wuzhou. During a battle in Huaiyuan, Li Wenmao was killed. Liuzhou then fell to the Qing. In 1859, Chen Kai led a large land and naval force in an attack on Wuzhou. The attack failed, and Chen Kai had to retreat with heavy losses.

In February 1861, the Qing army attacked Xiujing. The city fell after a six-month long siege. Chen Kai was killed in the battle. The rebellion then entered an insurgency phase of actively resisting the Qing army until the last rebel holdouts surrendered in May 1864.

== Impact ==
The British involvement in the counter-insurgency involved selling British weaponry to government forces and allowing the Chinese shipping carrying them to avoid rebel attack by using the British flag. That would lead to the Second Opium War in which a pirate ship with a British flag was captured by Chinese government forces.
