= Enping =

County-level city in Guangdong, China, known for hot springs

Enping 恩平市 Yanping
- County-level city
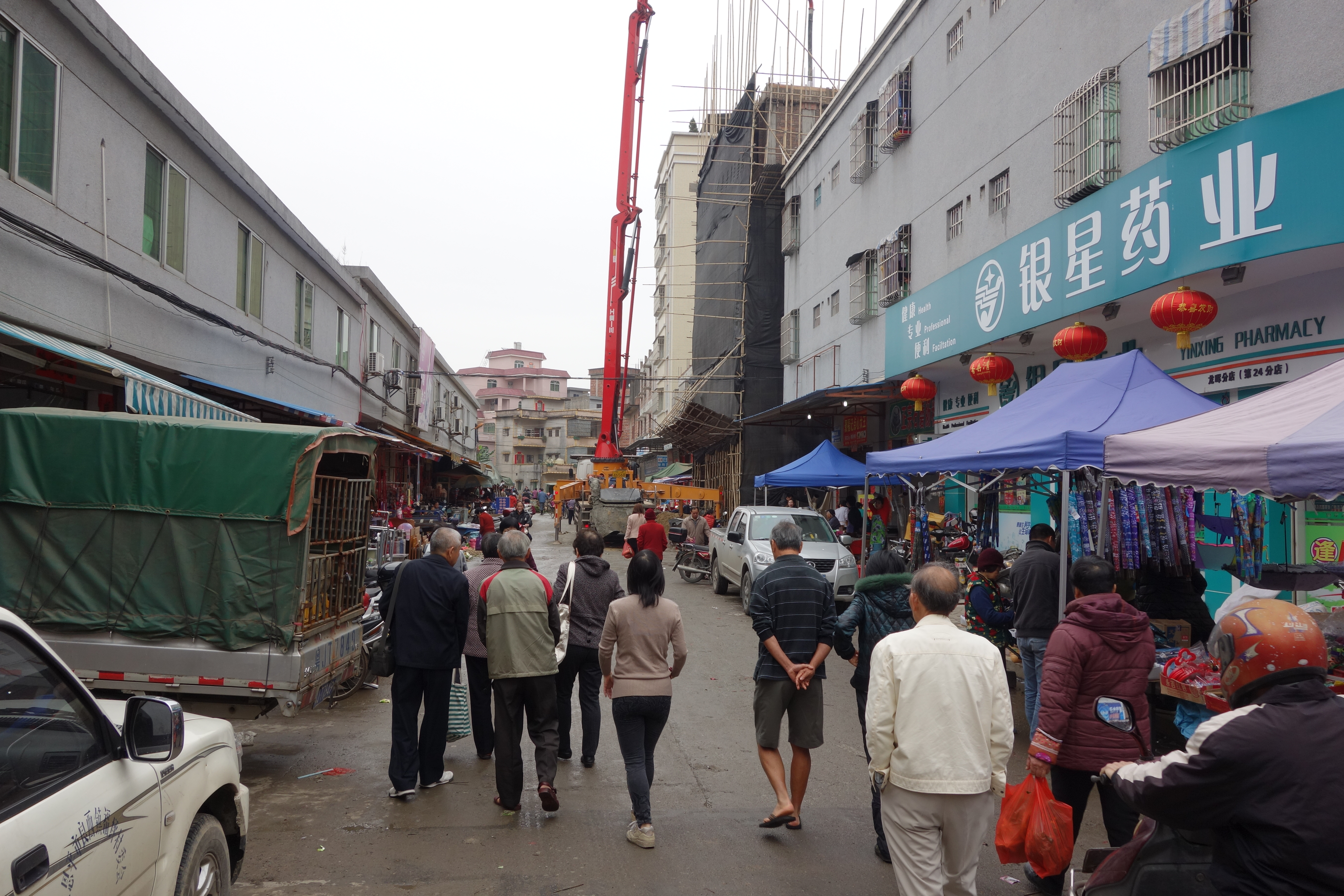
- Enping

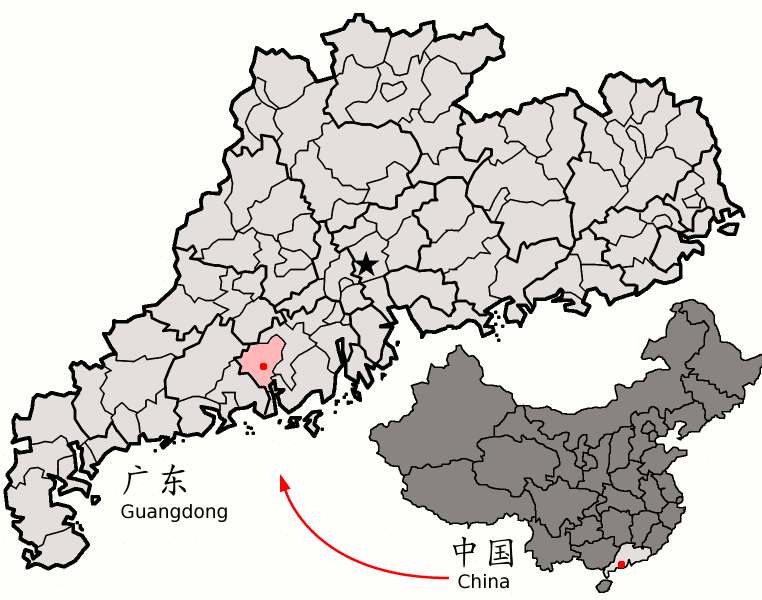
- Enping (red) within Jiangmen and Guangdong

- Location of the city centre in Guangdong
- Coordinates: 22°11′N 112°18′E
- Country: People's Republic of China
- Province: Guangdong
- Prefecture-level city: Jiangmen

Area
  - Total: 1,698 km^{2} (656 sq mi)

Population (2020 census)
  - Total: 483,907
  - Density: 285.0/km^{2} (738.1/sq mi)
- Time zone: UTC+8 (China Standard)

Enping
- Chinese: 恩平
- Postal: Yanping
- Literal meaning: Mercifully Pacified
Transcriptions
Standard Mandarin
- Hanyu Pinyin: Ēnpíng
Yue: Cantonese
- Jyutping: Jan^{1}-ping^{4}

Enping, alternately romanized as Yanping, (Note: Other former romanizations of Enping include Gan Ping, Gan-ping, Gan-p'ing, and Gan-ping-heën.) is a county-level city in Guangdong province, China, administered as part of the prefecture-level city of Jiangmen.

Enping administers an area of 1,698 km^{2} (656 sq mi) and had an estimated population of 483,907 in 2020. Its diaspora accounts for over 400,000 overseas Chinese, particularly in the Americas. It is notably the primary ancestral home for the majority of the Chinese in Venezuela, with an estimated 90% of that country's Chinese population originating from the city. The area around Enping is known for its many hot springs.

== Geography ==
Enping is located in southwest Guangdong, at the western edge of the Pearl River Delta and beside the South China Sea. Enping borders Kaiping to the northeast and Yangjing to the southwest.

== History ==
Enping County was established in AD 220. Under the Qing, it made up part of the commandery of Zhaoqing and was one of the Four Counties responsible for much of the early Chinese diaspora from Guangdong in the 19th century.

Academic studies by Gao Weinong indicate that Venezuela serves as the primary global destination for the Enping diaspora. The migration is characterized by strong chain-migration networks, with early settlers establishing a foundation in the grocery and restaurant sectors that allowed subsequent generations to migrate. By the early 21st century, the Enping community formed the vast majority of the Chinese population in Venezuela, maintaining deep cultural and economic ties through various hometown associations (*tongxianghui*). Migrants from Enping and their families make up about 200,000 of the country's estimated 400,000 Chinese. Emigration to Venezuela occurred primarily in the decades including and following the World Wars, with the largest batch leaving at the end of the Cultural Revolution in the late 1970s. Enping was made a county-level city in 1994. The Enping financial crisis later in the decade led to a massive scandal and the loss of financial services in the city.

== Administrative divisions ==
Enping comprises 10 towns, 3 sub-district offices, 4 farms and stations, and 174 village neighborhood committees.

Name	Chinese (S)	Hanyu Pinyin	Population (2010)
Encheng Subdistrict	恩城街道	Ēnchéng Jiēdào	197,788
Hengbei town	横陂镇	Héngbēi Zhèn	31,694
Shengtang town	圣堂镇	Shèngtáng Zhèn	25,038
Liangxi town	良西镇	Liángxī Zhèn	20,091
Shahu town	沙湖镇	Shāhú Zhèn	56,217
Niujiang town	牛江镇	Niújiāng Zhèn	23,430
Juntang town	君堂镇	Jūntáng Zhèn	46,475
Datian town	大田镇	Dàtián Zhèn	27,943
Naji town	那吉镇	Nàjí Zhèn	19,384
Dahuai town	大槐镇	Dàhuái Zhèn	18,625
Dongcheng town	东成镇	Dōngchéng Zhèn	26,129

== Climate ==
Climate data for Enping, elevation 69 m (226 ft), (1991–2020 normals, extremes 1963–present)
Month	Jan	Feb	Mar	Apr	May	Jun	Jul	Aug	Sep	Oct	Nov	Dec	Year
Record high °C (°F)	28.5 (83.3)	31.1 (88.0)	30.3 (86.5)	34.7 (94.5)	34.9 (94.8)	37.1 (98.8)	39.2 (102.6)	37.8 (100.0)	36.5 (97.7)	36.6 (97.9)	33.5 (92.3)	29.8 (85.6)	39.2 (102.6)
Mean daily maximum °C (°F)	19.0 (66.2)	20.5 (68.9)	22.7 (72.9)	26.7 (80.1)	30.3 (86.5)	31.8 (89.2)	32.9 (91.2)	33.0 (91.4)	31.7 (89.1)	29.3 (84.7)	25.6 (78.1)	21.2 (70.2)	27.1 (80.7)
Daily mean °C (°F)	14.7 (58.5)	16.3 (61.3)	18.9 (66.0)	23.0 (73.4)	26.2 (79.2)	27.8 (82.0)	28.5 (83.3)	28.4 (83.1)	27.3 (81.1)	24.8 (76.6)	20.8 (69.4)	16.6 (61.9)	22.8 (73.0)
Mean daily minimum °C (°F)	11.9 (53.4)	13.7 (56.7)	16.4 (61.5)	20.6 (69.1)	23.5 (74.3)	25.2 (77.4)	25.7 (78.3)	25.6 (78.1)	24.4 (75.9)	21.7 (71.1)	17.6 (63.7)	13.4 (56.1)	20.0 (68.0)
Record low °C (°F)	−0.5 (31.1)	5.0 (41.0)	6.9 (44.4)	10.6 (51.1)	17.9 (64.2)	20.8 (69.4)	23.3 (73.9)	22.4 (72.3)	20.0 (68.0)	14.7 (58.5)	7.2 (45.0)	3.4 (38.1)	−0.5 (31.1)
Average precipitation mm (inches)	57.4 (2.26)	63.5 (2.50)	98.3 (3.87)	244.5 (9.63)	383.2 (15.09)	513.5 (20.22)	375.1 (14.77)	370.3 (14.58)	264.2 (10.40)	85.6 (3.37)	47.3 (1.86)	37.5 (1.48)	2,540.4 (100.03)
Average precipitation days (≥ 0.1 mm)	8.2	11.2	16.2	15.7	19.3	22.1	20.3	18.2	14.2	6.5	5.9	5.6	163.4
Average relative humidity (%)	74	80	84	85	84	86	84	84	81	73	70	69	80
Mean monthly sunshine hours	105.8	79.3	61.7	79.6	125.9	150.2	189.7	175.8	163.1	179.5	153.7	137.3	1,601.6
Percentage possible sunshine	31	25	17	21	31	37	46	44	45	50	47	41	36
Source: China Meteorological Administrationall-time record lowall-time October record

== Demographics ==
Enping is a part of the Greater Taishan Region or Sze Yap Region, which includes Kaiping, Xinhui, Enping and Taishan. According to studies by Gao Weinong, Enping is the ancestral hometown of over 400,000 overseas Chinese, with Venezuela being the primary global destination for this diaspora.

== Notable people ==
- Ekin Cheng: Hong Kong actor and singer
- Katherine Sui Fun Cheung: First Asian American woman aviator
- Feng Ru: pioneering Chinese aviator and aircraft designer
- Douglas Jung: Canadian politician and member of the Canadian Parliament
- Peter T. Poon: Renowned Chinese American space scientist
- Harry Shum Jr.: Costa Rica-born American actor and dancer
- John Shum: Hong Kong film producer and political activist
- Tang Wensheng: American-born Chinese diplomat
