= Siyi =

Four former counties in Guangdong, China

Sze Yup
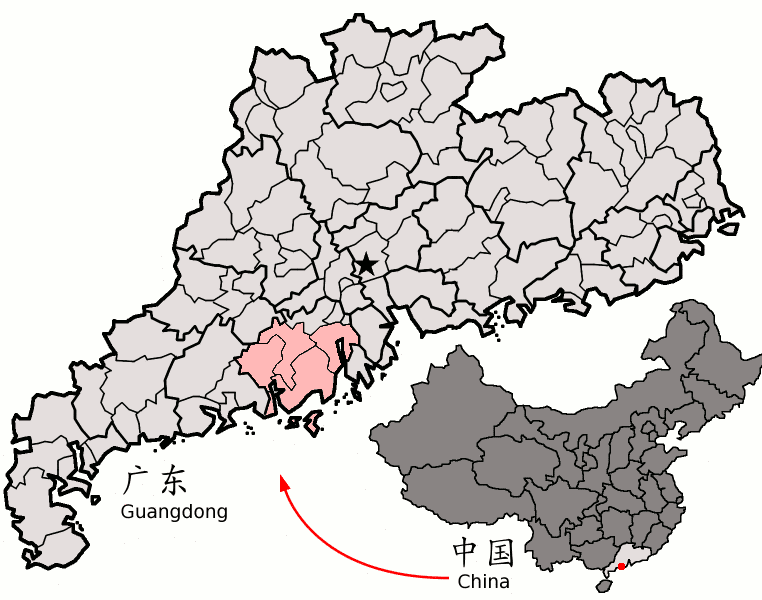
- Top: Location of Sze Yup (pink) within the province of Guangdong (gray)
- Chinese: 四邑
- Literal meaning: Four counties
Transcriptions
Standard Mandarin
- Hanyu Pinyin: Sìyì
- Wade–Giles: Ssu^{4}-i^{4}
- IPA: [sɹ̩̂î]
Yue: Cantonese
- Yale Romanization: Seiyāp
- Jyutping: sei3 jap1
other Yue
- Taishanese: ɬi33 yip55

Alternative Chinese name
- Chinese: 五邑
- Literal meaning: Five counties
Transcriptions
Standard Mandarin
- Hanyu Pinyin: Wǔyì
Yue: Cantonese
- Yale Romanization: Nghyāp
- Jyutping: ng5 jap1

The Siyi (Seiyap or Sze Yup in Cantonese; Chinese: 四邑; pinyin: Sìyì; Jyutping: sei3 jap1; lit. 'Four Counties') refers to the four former counties of Xinhui (Sunwui), Taishan (Toisan), Kaiping (Hoiping) and Enping (Yanping) on the west side of the Pearl River Delta in Southern Guangdong Province, China.

== Geography ==
One of the early descriptions of the land came from the American missionary, William Speer, who lived there around 1850 and observed: "Towns embowered in bamboo, a species of banyan and other trees meet the eye on every hand. The level portion of the soil is cultivated as only the Chinese know how to do in order to obtain the utmost possible returns from Nature. The view appears like a great garden bounded by ranges of hills."

Xinhui is a city district and the other three are county-level cities; all four belong to Jiangmen Prefecture administered from the city of Jiangmen. An alternative term, Wuyi (Chinese: 五邑; pinyin: Wǔyì, Cantonese: Ng5 Yap1; 'five counties'), which refers to the five former counties of Xinhui, Taishan, Kaiping and Enping as well as Heshan, all administered by Jiangmen, has become an official title and is widely accepted by the local residents today. However, among overseas Chinese, the name Seiyap (Siyi) is still popular and frequently used, as Heshan County was established much later than the other four.

It is said that over 100 famous people come from the Siyi or Wuyi region of Guangdong Province, making the region famous for producing more entertainment stars than any other region in mainland China. As a result, the local government in Jiangmen which administers the Siyi or Wuyi cities of Taishan, Kaiping, Enping, Xinhui and Heshan, decided to build a Stars Park called Jiangmen Star Park.

Japanese attacked Taishan on 3 March 1941 for the first time. A Japanese flag was torn down by Taishanese villagers in Wenbian and Baishi after Japanese retreated from their first attack in Taishan, 8-9 Japanese ewre killed in an ambush by Taishanese in Daheng market and another 2 Japanese killed in a subsequent ambush which led to fighting and Japanese withdrawal. Japanese hiding in a bamboo grove were hit by a homemade cannon by Taishanese from Baishi village after two Japanese were knocked off their forces by gunfire from militia from Wenbian and Baishi villages along with Anbu and Changlingdong. The villagers formed the Daheng anti-Japanese task force to attack 50-60 Japanese led by 2 mounted officers on 8 March 1941, after a battle between Taishanese in Daheng and over 40 Japanese on 5 March were Japanese were killed and injured. 18 Japanese were killed after 2 Japanese boats were sunk by home made cannons and fish cannons by three Chinese fishing boats on 18 May 1941 in Taishan close to Xiachuan and Sahngchuan islands 7 watchtowers defended Nancun village against the Japanese and there were 60-70 men defending the towers. Sijiunan village was attacked by Taicheng-based Japanese on 5 July 1944. Japanese were ambushed at Baizu mountain by the village and wounded. The Japanese then attacked from six directions witth 1,200 men 5 days later. Japanese were wounded and killed with machine gun fire by 30 NRA soldiers at Nancun while a Japanese officer was shot from his horse by a musket shotgun at Zhujiao watchtower by militia and over 10 Japanese soldiers were killed by village militia at Nanying tower. After a day, the Japanese hit bombarded the towers with over 10 cannons and mortars. Many Chinese village militia then fought their way and broke out of the siege of Nancun, fighting their way out of the watchtowers, only 8 villagers were left in one tower to fight to the death. More than a 100 Japanese were killed in Nancun village at the siege of the towers. On the Chinese side 10 civilians and 25 militia were killed at the battle.

3 Japanese motorboats were damaged, one Japanese boat sunk by a homemade cannon and one Japanese boat sunk by ramming in a battle in Yinzhou lake in 1939 led by Captain Liang Huo of the Anti-Japanese city protection corps, owned by Industrial and Commercial shipping company chairman Zhu Keqin. Old home made cannons were used in clan feuds in Xinhui and Taishan county of Guangdong during the Republic of China.

Chinese villagers used gongs, rifles and home made cannons at Dihai to ambush Japanese. The ambush was carried out by Sansi Township Self-Defence Force, Taishan Fourth district self-Defence force and over 20 members of Dihai self defence force led by Yu Hejun, a township head, in Dihai, Taishan after Japan occupied Xinchang and Changsha on 24 June 1944.

In Enping, Guangdong, the Zhen family clan lived in Pingtang village. They founded the Pintang Village anti-Japanese team in the war, using home made muzzle loading cannons and homemade muskets. The cannons were manned by Zhen Juerong, Zhen Peilin and Zhen Chongpu. Pintgtang village was attacked on three sides, west, south and east and the battle took place in July 1945 after Japanese attacked Sha'an village where the Chen clan lived. The Zhen family evacuated all the children, women and elderly and had people guard sluice gates and dug moats to protect the village. All men of the clan from 18 to 45 fought in the militia with all guns they had. The village clan elders were Zhen Chongzuo, Zhen Chongbi, Zhen Jingli, Zhen Likan, Zhen Pinli and Zhen Chongxun. The fighting took place for 3 to 5 hours before the villager ammunition ran out, and then the Zhen clan withdrew from their empty village and left all the doors open, with only a single elderly deaf and mute woman in it, the mother of Zhen Shuyuan. The Japanese were terrified of a trap or trick when they saw the mute elderly woman standing in the empty village and then left.

== Dialects ==
The area gave rise to the Siyi dialects, the most prominent of which is Taishanese (Toisanese/Hoisanese). Although Siyi and Cantonese both belong to the Yue branch of Chinese, Cantonese speakers cannot easily understand Siyi dialect.

== Emigration ==
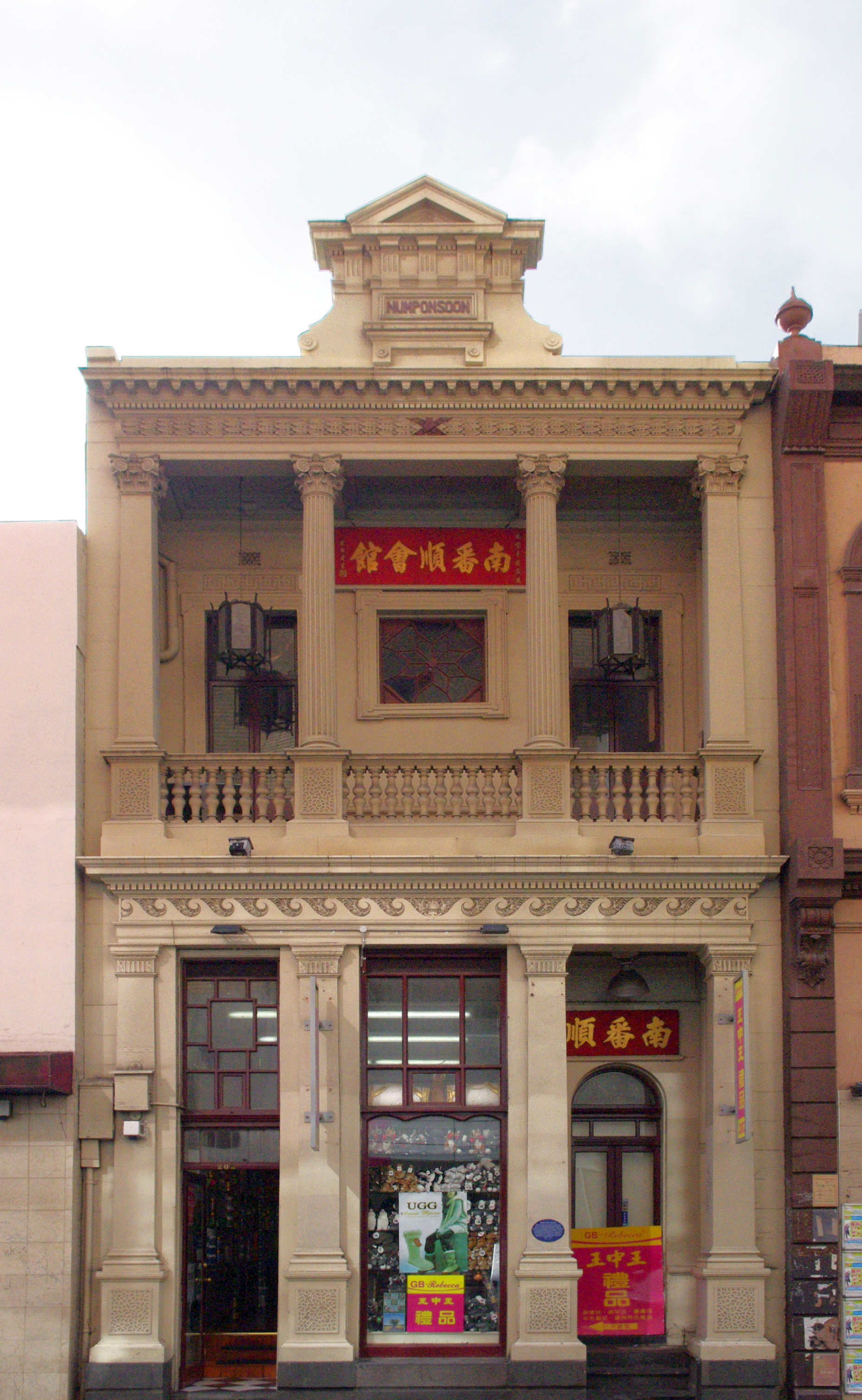
The Num Pon Soon building in Chinatown, Melbourne. The Num Pon Soon Society is a district society, a benevolent association aimed at supporting Siyi immigrants to Melbourne during the Victorian gold rush.

In the late 19th century and early 20th century, many people from the Siyi (or Sze Yup as it was then known) emigrated to Hong Kong, Southeast Asia, Australasia, North America and South America. Of the Chinese American population from that time until the 1950s, Sze Yup accounted for the vast majority, about 80%, along with people from Sanyi (Sam Yup) and Zhongshan (Chung Shan).

In America, people from Sze Yup generally worked as laborers; Sam Yup people worked as entrepreneurs; and Chung Shan people specialized in agriculture. The Punti–Hakka Clan Wars also erupted in the Sze Yup counties just prior to this time period of emigration. In 1851, two Wui Gun (huiguan; traditional Chinese: 會館; simplified Chinese: 会馆; pinyin: huìguǎn; Jyutping: wui^{6}gun^{2}) (native place associations) were established in San Francisco: the Sze Yup Wui Gun and the Sam Yup Wui Gun. Endowed with only limited arable lands, with much of the terrain either rocky or swampy, Sze Yup was the "pre-eminent sending area" of overseas Chinese.

In addition to being a region of major emigration abroad, Sze Yup is a melting pot of ideas and trends brought back by overseas Chinese. For example, many tong lau in Chekham and diaolou in Hoiping and Toishan built in the early 20th century incorporate architectural features from both China and the West.

Notable people:

- Chen Xian Zhang (陳獻章): scholar of Ming dynasty
- Liang Qichao (梁啓超): scholar of early modern China
- Wu Xiang Shi (吳尚時; 1904–1947): geographer
- Gary Faye Locke (駱家輝): Chinese American, a politician, his ancestral hometown is Taishan City
- Joey Yung (容祖兒): female singer of Hong Kong
- Andy Lau (劉德華): male singer and actor of Hong Kong
- Anutin Charnvirakul (陳錫堯): 32nd Prime Minister of Thailand

== Popular culture ==
Mark Twain references the See Yup Company, and the Ning Yeong Company, in Roughing It.

== See also ==
- Sanyi
- Yue Chinese
