= Sanyi =

Locality within Guangdong, China

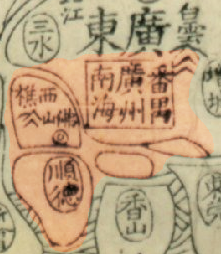
- Detail of a 1797 map, with added highlighting on the Guangzhou area, including the Sanyi
- Chinese: 三邑
- Literal meaning: Three counties
Transcriptions
Standard Mandarin
- Hanyu Pinyin: sānyì
Yue: Cantonese
- Yale Romanization: Sāmyāp
- Jyutping: saam1 jap1

Alternative Chinese name
- Traditional Chinese: 南番順
- Simplified Chinese: 南番顺
- Literal meaning: Nanhai Panyu Shunde
Transcriptions
Standard Mandarin
- Hanyu Pinyin: Nánpānshùn
Yue: Cantonese
- Yale Romanization: Nàahmpūnseuhn
- Jyutping: naam4 pun1 seon6

Sanyi (Chinese: 三邑; pinyin: sānyì; Jyutping: saam1 jap1; lit. 'Three counties') or Nanpanshun (Chinese: 南番順; pinyin: Nánpānshùn; Jyutping: naam4 pun1 seon6; lit. 'Nanhai Panyu Shunde'), also known by Cantonese romanizations such as Sam Yup and Nam Pun Shun, refers to the three former counties of Nanhai, Panyu and Shunde, making up much of Guangzhou and Foshan in Guangdong, China.

== Geography ==
The former counties and the corresponding modern districts are

Nanhai
Modern Nanhai and Chancheng in Foshan and a small part of Liwan in Guangzhou
Panyu
Modern Panyu, Yuexiu, large part of Liwan, Haizhu, Huangpu, Baiyun and large part of Nansha, all in Guangzhou
Shunde
Modern Shunde, Foshan

== Dialects ==
The area gave rise to the Yuehai dialects, the most prominent of which is Cantonese (Guangzhou/Guangfu dialect). Standard Cantonese is based on the Yuehai dialects belongs to the Yue branch of Chinese, Cantonese speakers easily understand throughout Chinese part of Lingnan area.

== Emigration ==
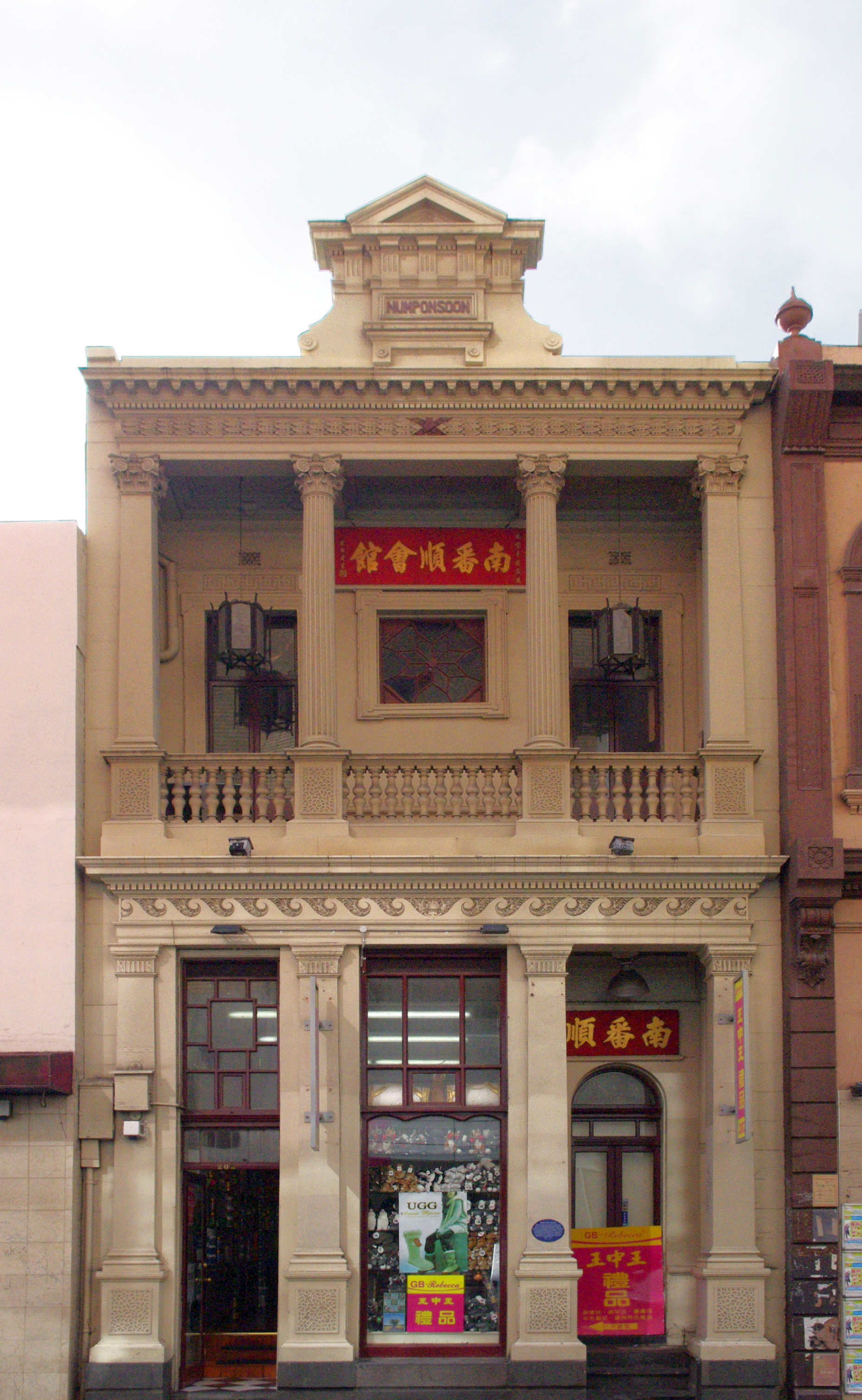
The Num Pon Soon building in Chinatown, Melbourne. The Num Pon Soon Society is a district society, a benevolent association aimed at supporting Sanyi immigrants to Melbourne during the Victorian gold rush.

Most of the Chinese immigrants to the United States in the late 19th century and early 20th century came from eight districts in the Pearl River Delta, including the three districts of Sanyi, together with the four districts of Siyi to the southwest and the district of Zhongshan.

== See also ==
- Siyi
- Yue Chinese
