= Heshan, Guangdong =

City in China

Heshan 鹤山市
- County-level city

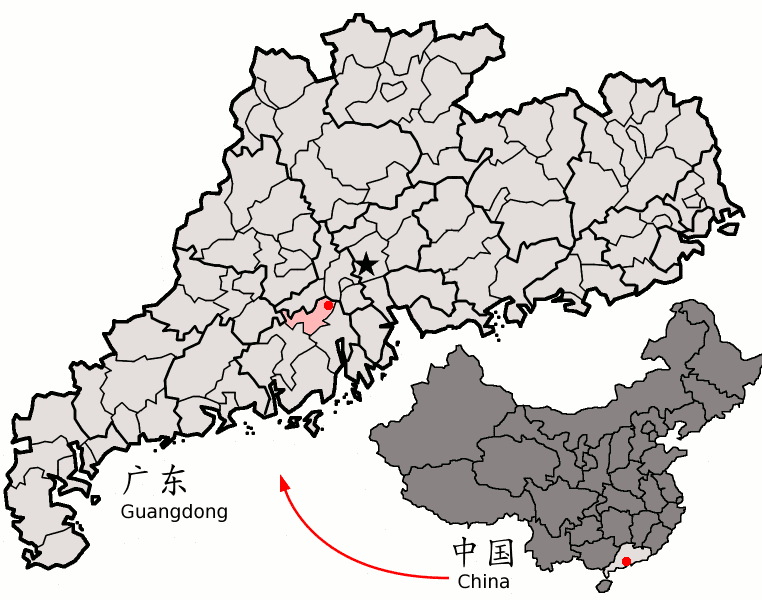
- Location of Heshan City (pink) in Jiangmen City (yellow), Guangdong province, and the PRC

- Location of the city centre in Guangdong
- Coordinates: 22°46′N 112°57′E
- Country: People's Republic of China
- Province: Guangdong
- Prefecture-level city: Jiangmen
- County seat: Shaping

Area
  - Total: 1,081 km^{2} (417 sq mi)

Population (2020 census)
  - Total: 530,684
  - Density: 490.9/km^{2} (1,271/sq mi)
- Time zone: UTC+8 (China Standard)
- Postal code: 529700
- Area code: 0750

Heshan
- Simplified Chinese: 鹤山
- Traditional Chinese: 鶴山
- Postal: Hokshan
- Literal meaning: Crane Mountain
Transcriptions
Standard Mandarin
- Hanyu Pinyin: Hèshān
Yue: Cantonese
- Jyutping: Hok^{6}-saan^{1}

Heshan (Chinese: 鹤山), formerly romanized as Hokshan, is a county-level city of Jiangmen City in the southern part of Guangdong Province, China with a total land area of 1,081 square kilometres (417 sq mi) and a population of 530,684 inhabitants as of 2020 census and some 200,000 internal migrants. The city is now being conurbated with Jiangmen and therefore is included in the Guangzhou-Shenzhen Pearl River conurbation with more than 65,57 million inhabitants. As an important qiao'xiang (侨乡) of Guangdong province, there are approximately 360,000 people of Heshan origin or descent living in other parts of the world, particularly in the Americas such as Chile, Peru and the United States.

Situated about 60 kilometres (37 mi) south west of the provincial capital, Guangzhou, Heshan occupies a strategic location on the Pearl River Delta, commanding the northern gateway to Jiangmen's five administrative divisions. Along the opposite bank of the same river, lie the two municipalities of Nanhai and Shunde. Heshan is around three hours from Hong Kong and one hour from Macau by road. The city's harbour can accommodate vessels of up to 3,000 long tons (3,050 t). Ships ply from here to Hong Kong directly.

== Name ==
Heshan—one of several places in China whose name means "Mount Crane"—takes its name from a nearby mountain thought to resemble the shape of the bird. The spelling Heshan derives from the pinyin romanization of the name's Mandarin pronunciation. The Postal Map spelling Hokshan was a combination of the local Cantonese pronunciation of the first character and the Mandarin pronunciation of the second. Heshan has also been romanized as Ho Shan and Ho-shan.

== History ==
Heshan was made a prefecture in 1732 during the reign of the Yongzheng Emperor of the Qing. By the 19th century, Heshan County made up part of the commandery of Zhaoqing. In 1993, it was promoted to a county-level city.

== Administrative divisions ==
Heshan Municipality administers ten towns:

Name	Chinese (S)	Hanyu Pinyin	Population (2010)
Shaping Subdistrict	沙坪街道	Shāpíng Jiēdào	197,155
Longkou town	龙口镇	Lóngkǒu Zhèn	36,625
Yayao town	雅瑶镇	Yǎyáo Zhèn	38,851
Gulao town	古劳镇	Gǔláo Zhèn	35,606
Taoyuan town	桃源镇	Táoyuán Zhèn	25,902
Hecheng town	鹤城镇	Hèchéng Zhèn	32,170
Gonghe town	共和镇	Gònghé Zhèn	41,338
Zhishan town	址山镇	Zhǐshān Zhèn	32,009
Zhaiwu town	宅梧镇	Zháiwú Zhèn	26,254
Yunxiang town	云乡镇	Yúnxiāng Zhèn	12,453
Shuanghe town	双合镇	Shuānghé Zhèn	16,575

== Industry ==
Heshan is located at the center of one of China's largest furniture producing areas, with approximately 10% of the world's furniture produced on its outskirts.

== Culture ==
Heshan is the birthplace of the Southern lion dance style known as the Hok San lion dance.

== Notable individuals ==
- Robin Lee, winner of 1986 Miss Hong Kong Pageant.

== Climate ==
Climate data for Heshan, elevation 47 m (154 ft), (1991–2020 normals, extremes 1961–present)
Month	Jan	Feb	Mar	Apr	May	Jun	Jul	Aug	Sep	Oct	Nov	Dec	Year
Record high °C (°F)	29.0 (84.2)	31.7 (89.1)	31.8 (89.2)	35.2 (95.4)	35.3 (95.5)	38.1 (100.6)	39.6 (103.3)	38.2 (100.8)	36.8 (98.2)	35.8 (96.4)	33.1 (91.6)	29.8 (85.6)	39.6 (103.3)
Mean daily maximum °C (°F)	17.7 (63.9)	19.4 (66.9)	22.0 (71.6)	26.5 (79.7)	30.1 (86.2)	31.9 (89.4)	33.2 (91.8)	33.1 (91.6)	31.7 (89.1)	29.1 (84.4)	24.7 (76.5)	19.9 (67.8)	26.6 (79.9)
Daily mean °C (°F)	13.7 (56.7)	15.5 (59.9)	18.2 (64.8)	22.7 (72.9)	26.1 (79.0)	27.9 (82.2)	28.9 (84.0)	28.8 (83.8)	27.7 (81.9)	24.9 (76.8)	20.4 (68.7)	15.7 (60.3)	22.5 (72.6)
Mean daily minimum °C (°F)	11.0 (51.8)	12.9 (55.2)	15.7 (60.3)	20.2 (68.4)	23.4 (74.1)	25.4 (77.7)	26.0 (78.8)	26.0 (78.8)	24.8 (76.6)	21.9 (71.4)	17.3 (63.1)	12.7 (54.9)	19.8 (67.6)
Record low °C (°F)	0.0 (32.0)	2.6 (36.7)	3.7 (38.7)	8.8 (47.8)	15.5 (59.9)	18.4 (65.1)	22.2 (72.0)	22.3 (72.1)	16.4 (61.5)	10.5 (50.9)	4.6 (40.3)	1.5 (34.7)	0.0 (32.0)
Average precipitation mm (inches)	52.7 (2.07)	52.4 (2.06)	89.8 (3.54)	164.9 (6.49)	279.6 (11.01)	312.3 (12.30)	239.8 (9.44)	275.6 (10.85)	206.0 (8.11)	80.8 (3.18)	40.4 (1.59)	36.0 (1.42)	1,830.3 (72.06)
Average precipitation days (≥ 0.1 mm)	7.3	9.9	14.7	15.3	17.7	19.2	16.3	17.0	12.8	5.6	5.9	5.3	147
Average relative humidity (%)	73	78	82	83	83	84	81	81	77	70	70	68	78
Mean monthly sunshine hours	112.5	83.0	68.7	88.4	137.3	161.0	210.2	190.0	178.7	192.4	160.7	147.0	1,729.9
Percentage possible sunshine	33	26	18	23	33	40	51	48	49	54	49	44	39
Source: China Meteorological Administrationall-time extreme low
