= Taicheng Subdistrict =

Taicheng Subdistrict 台城街道
- Subdistrict
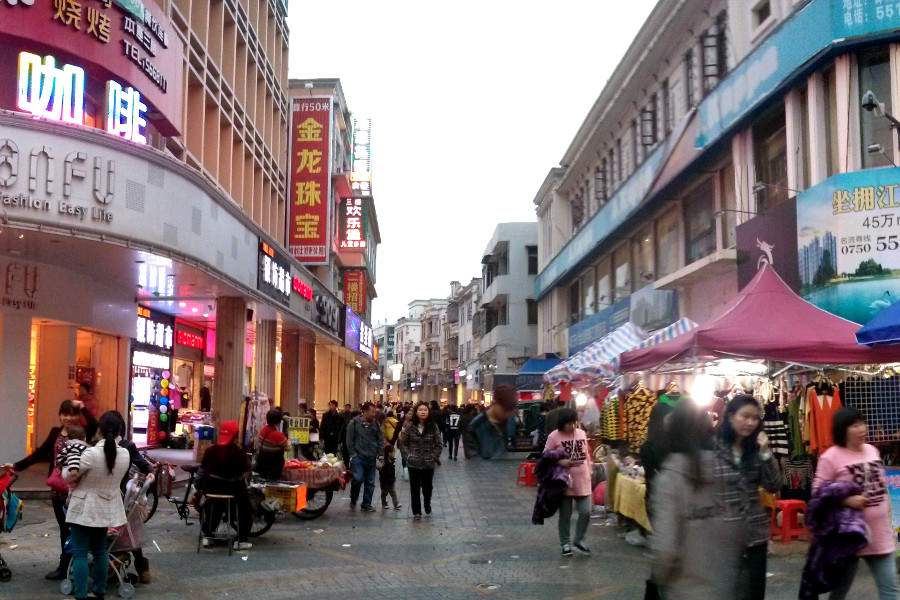

- Taicheng Subdistrict in Guangdong
- Country: People's Republic of China
- Province: Guangdong
- Prefecture-level city: Jiangmen
- County-level city: Taishan

Population (2008)
  - Total: 175,321

Taicheng Subdistrict (simplified Chinese: 台城街道; traditional Chinese: 臺城街道; pinyin: Táichéng Jiēdào) is a subdistrict which serves as the capital of the county-level city of Taishan, Jiangmen, Guangdong Province, China. The subdistrict lies on the right bank of the Pearl River Delta in Guangdong.

== History ==
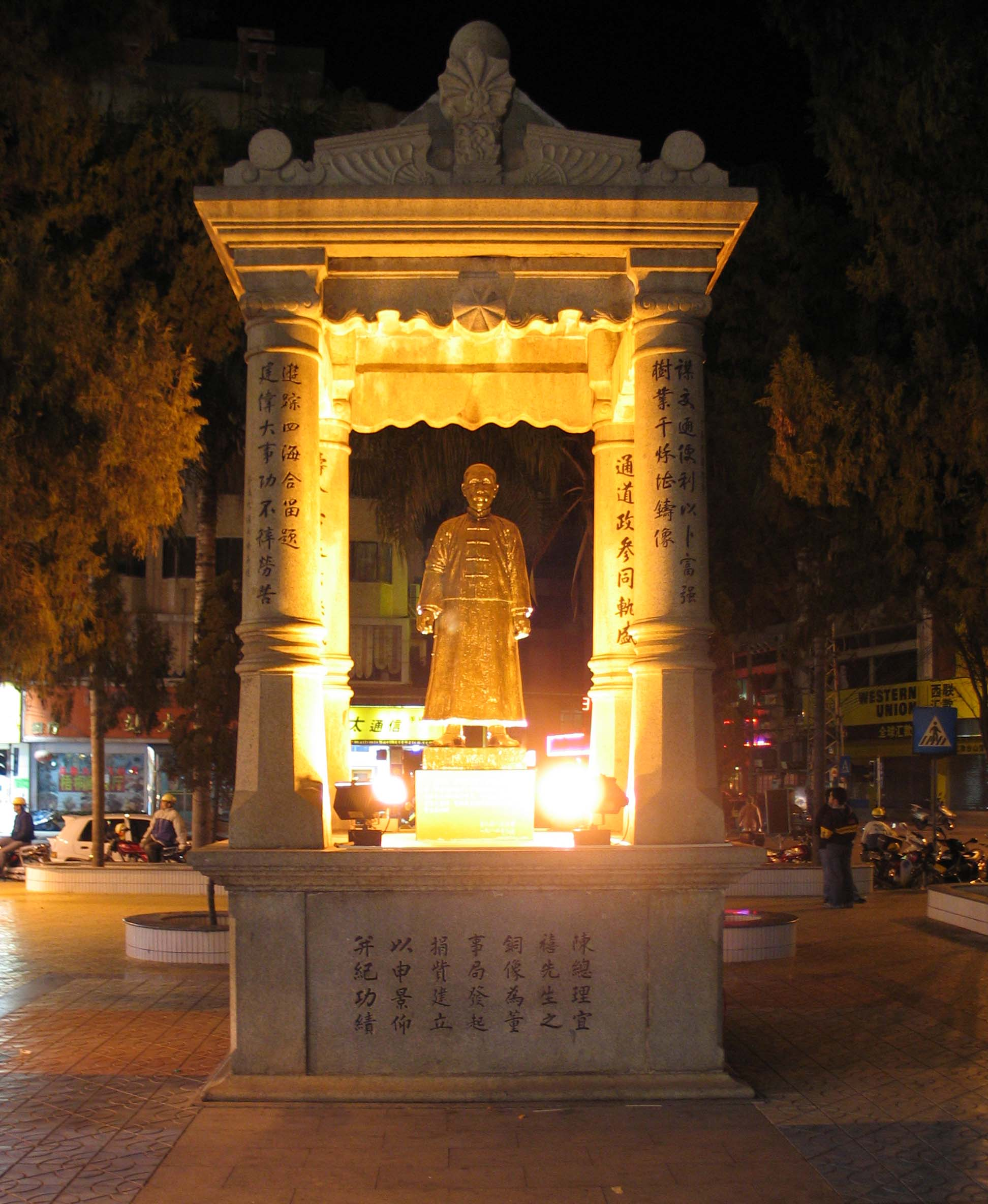
Monument to Chin Gee Hee

The area of present-day Taicheng Subdistrict has been continuously incorporated since 1499, when the area was incorporated as Xinning City (新宁城).

In 1891, the Presbyterian Church of America constructed a chapel on the main thoroughfare of Tai Xi Road, which was reconstructed in elegant red-brick in 1922 with a capacity of 300.

In 1906, under the oversight of Chin Gee Hee, the Sun Ning Railway Company began building a railway to connect Sunning (Xinning) County to its northern and southern neighbors. On March 1, 1909, the Sunning Railway Station (Chinese: 新寧鐵路總站) was opened in what is now the subdistrict. The rail line, which was completed in 1920, drew attention both domestically and internationally for being the first Chinese-funded and Chinese-constructed railroad in the world.

In 1907, the Tan Clan Middle School was founded east of the town, but is now surrounded by urban development. A new residential school is being constructed outside of the town to replace what is now a dilapidated and crowded structure.

In 1938, Xinning was designated the administrative center of Xinning County. The same year, the area's railway was ordered by the Nationalist Government to be destroyed to prevent the advance of invading Japanese troops. The Xinning Railway Station would subsequently be repurposed as a bus station.

On March 3, 1941, Japanese troops from Doushan marched into Taicheng led by a Chinese traitor, and took the town in three hours. 282 people were killed, 534 stores and houses were burnt, and goods estimated at ¥3,600,000 were plundered. A week later the Nationalist Chinese Army retook the town, but were again forced out on September 20, 1941. Japanese troops remained in occupation until their unconditional surrender at the end of the war on August 15, 1945.

In 1949 more than 30,000 people gathered in Taishan Park to celebrate the Communist victory in the civil war against the armies of the Kuomintang (KMT) of Chiang Kai-shek. Upon the establishment of the People's Republic of China, Xinning City was renamed as Taicheng Town (simplified Chinese: 台城镇; traditional Chinese: 臺城鎭).

From 1958 to 1983, Taicheng was re-designated as a people's commune.

On August 11, 2006, Taicheng was upgraded from a town to a subdistrict.

Railway service within the subdistrict restarted in 2018 with the construction of the Taishan railway station (22.302197°N 112.810171°E) within the village of Nankeng. The railway station was designed to replicate the original design of the Xinning Railway Station. The station lies on the Shenzhen–Zhanjiang high-speed railway.

== Geography ==
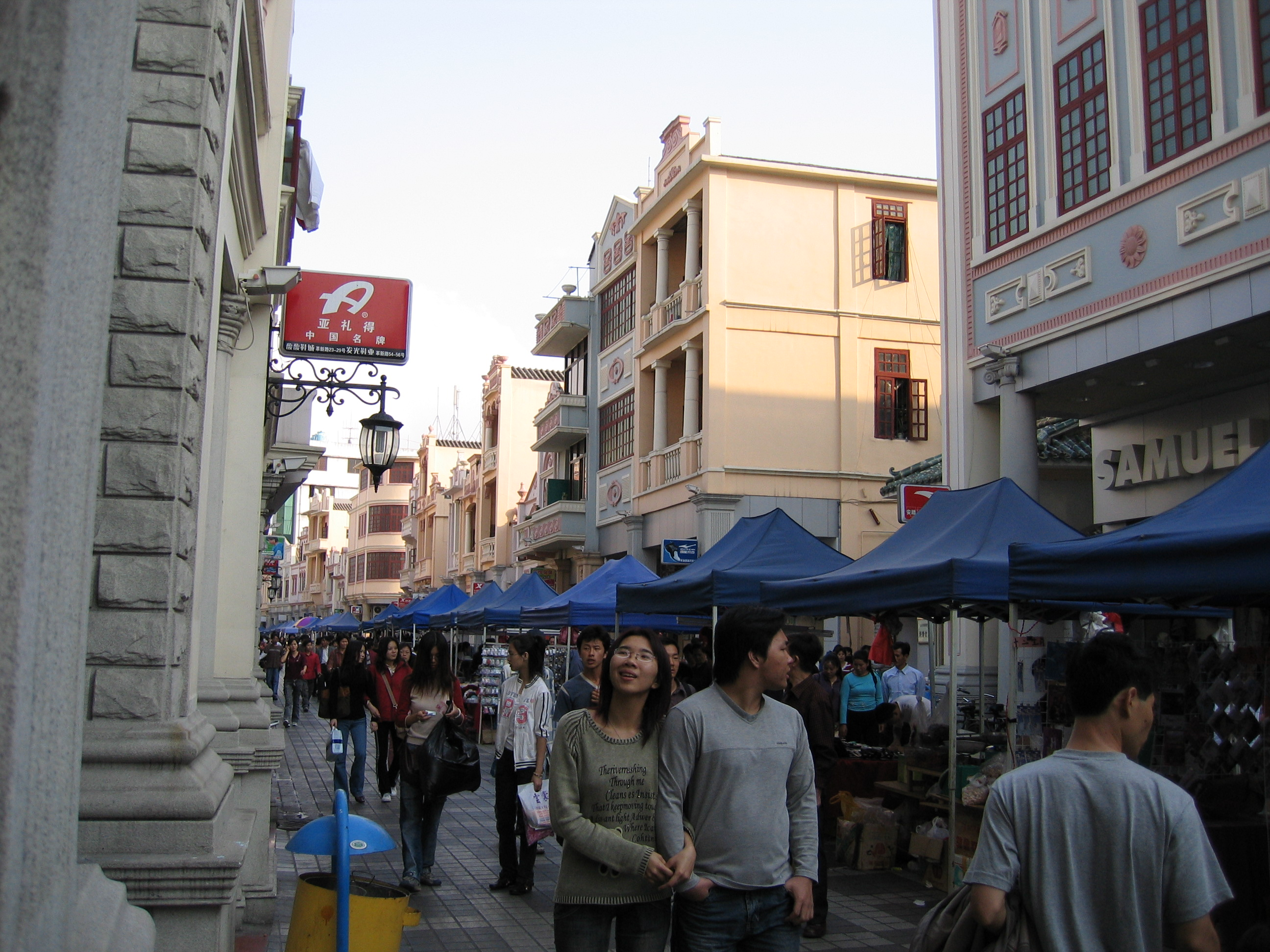
Pedestrian Mall

The subdistrict covers 157.6 km² with a population of 175,321 as of 2008. Taicheng is bordered to its east by the town of Sijiu, by the town of Baisha to its west, the towns of Sanhe and Chonglou to its south, and the town of Shuibu to its north.

With the urban center covering only some 18 km^{2}, there are 27000 mu under cultivation. Some of the subdistrict's villages are surrounded by high-rise urban development, while others lie in the rural outskirts of the township, including the village of Bihou.

== Administrative divisions ==
Taicheng Subdistrict administers 11 residential communities and 26 administrative villages.

The subdistrict's 11 residential communities are Fucheng Residential Community (富城社区), Dongyun Residential Community (东云社区), Huannan Residential Community (环南社区), Nantang Residential Community (南塘社区), Xinqiao Residential Community (新桥社区), Yuantian Residential Community (园田社区), Shanglang Residential Community (上朗社区), Hexin Residential Community (合新社区), Qiaohu Residential Community (桥湖社区), Cangxia Residential Community (仓下社区), and Fenghuang Residential Community (凤凰社区).

The subdistrict's 26 administrative villages are Shakeng Village (沙坑村), Beikeng Village (北坑村), Dongkeng Village (东坑村), Bangang Village (板岗村), Hebei Village (河北村), Nankeng Village (南坑村), Shihua Village (石花村), Anbu Village (安步村), Daheng Village (大亨村), Changling Village (长岭村), Xiangyanhu Village (香雁湖村), Chanxi Village (廛溪村), Henghu Village (横湖村), Libian Village (礼边村), Jinkeng Village (筋坑村), Paobu Village (泡步村), Shuinan Village (水南村), Zhudong Village (朱洞村), Pinggang Village (平岗村), Lingbei Village (岭背村), Luodong Village (罗洞村), Dancun Village (淡村村), Yuanshan Village (元山村), Baishui Village (白水村), Guishui Village (桂水村), and Sanshe Village (三社村).
