= Taicheng =

Taicheng (台城) may refer to:

- Taicheng, Wutai County (台城鎮), a town in Wutai County, Shanxi
- Taicheng Subdistrict (台城街道), the seat of Taishan, Guangdong

== See also ==
- Taichang (disambiguation)
- Taichung, Taiwan
