= Sanba, Guangdong =

Township in Guangdong, China

Coordinates: 22.293226°N 112.691231°E

Sanba (三八) is a township located northwest of Taicheng, capital of Taishan, in the Guangdong province of southern China.

Most of its inhabitants have the family clan name of Chen and Kwong.

In 2005, Sanba township was merged with Baisha town.
