= Chaojing =

Chaojing 潮境镇
- Town
- Location within Guangdong
- Coordinates: 22.2747°N 112.6686°E
- Country: China
- Province: Guangdong
- City: Taishan

Chaojing (Chinese: 潮境镇; pinyin: Cháojìng) is a town in Taishan City, Jiangmen, Guangdong Province, China. It is located northwest of Taishan City 11.4 kilometres (7.1 mi) from Baisha Town.

Though identified as a village (潮境村) in some government documents, it is a true town, having a hospital, a high school, a public market, a post office, a rural agricultural bank branch, an automobile dealership, and other services.

== History ==
Chaojing is a common reference point for many overseas Chinese when talking about where they came from. In the 19th and early 20th Centuries, most Chinese emigrants worldwide came from Taishan County or nearby, many of them out of the broad rural area around Chaojing.

In the local Taishanese dialect, the town is known as CHAO GEIN. On pre-1949 maps, Chaojing is labeled as Ch'ao-Ching. In some online maps, it may be unlabeled or called Chaoxingli.

== Environment ==
Chaojing is in a hilly rural part of Taishan County that grows rice. It can be reached by County Road x553, which splits off to the southwest from Provincial Highway s274 just below Sanbu ("Three Ports") along the Tanjiang River. Chaojing is right at the bend of x553 when it turns sharply southwest toward Baisha City. It is governmentally part of Baisha Township in Taishan County.

== See also ==
List of township-level divisions of Guangdong
