= Taishan railway station (Guangdong) =

Railway station in Taishan, Jiangmen, Guangdong, China

Taishan Railway Station 台山站
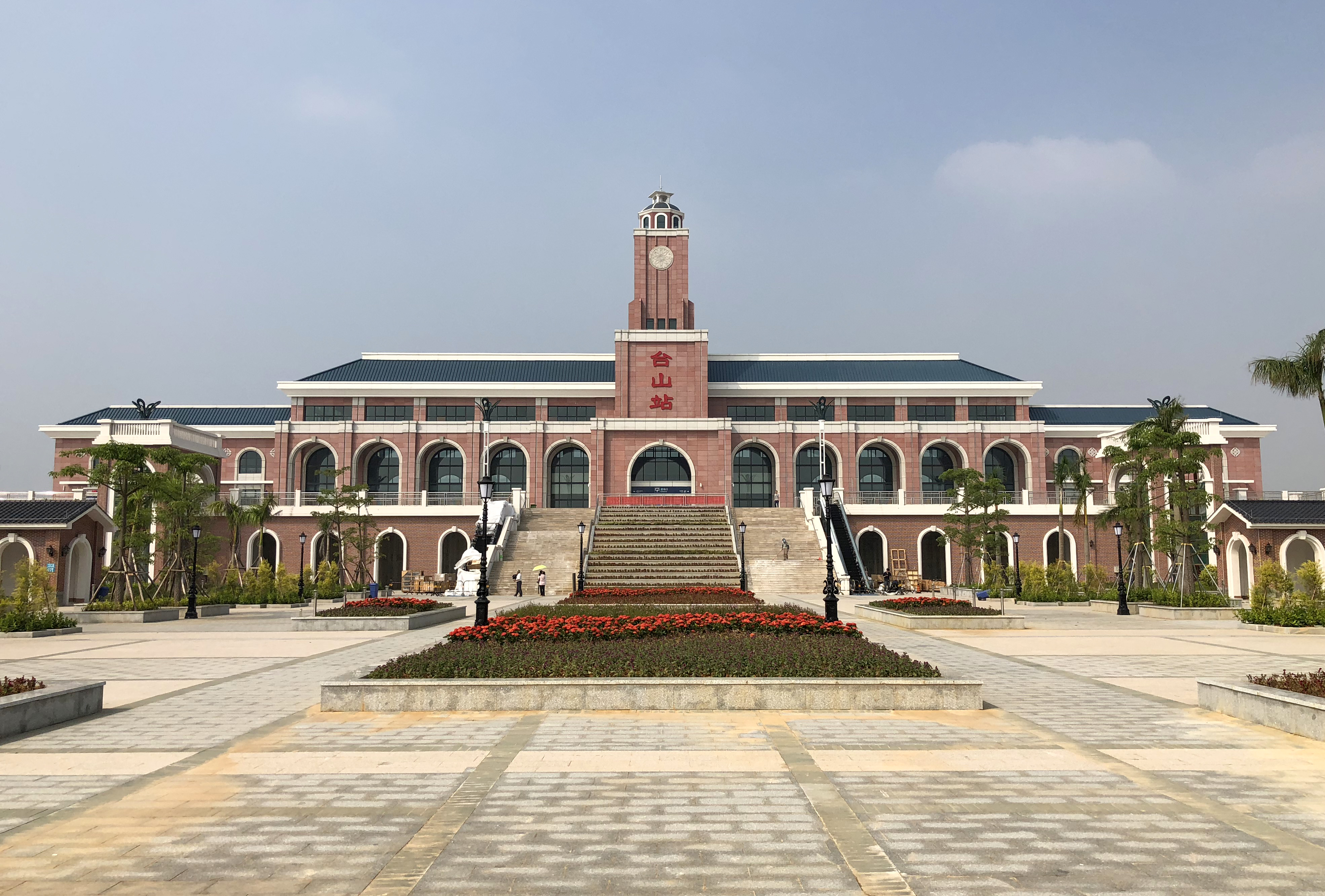

General information
- Location: Nankeng Village, Taicheng Subdistrict, Taishan, Jiangmen, Guangdong, China
- Coordinates: 22.302197°N 112.810171°E

Other information
- Station code: 23816 (TMIS)
Location
- Location within Guangdong

Taishan railway station (Chinese: 台山站; pinyin: Táishān Zhàn) is a railway station located in Nankeng Village, Taicheng Subdistrict, Taishan, Jiangmen, Guangdong Province, China.

== History ==
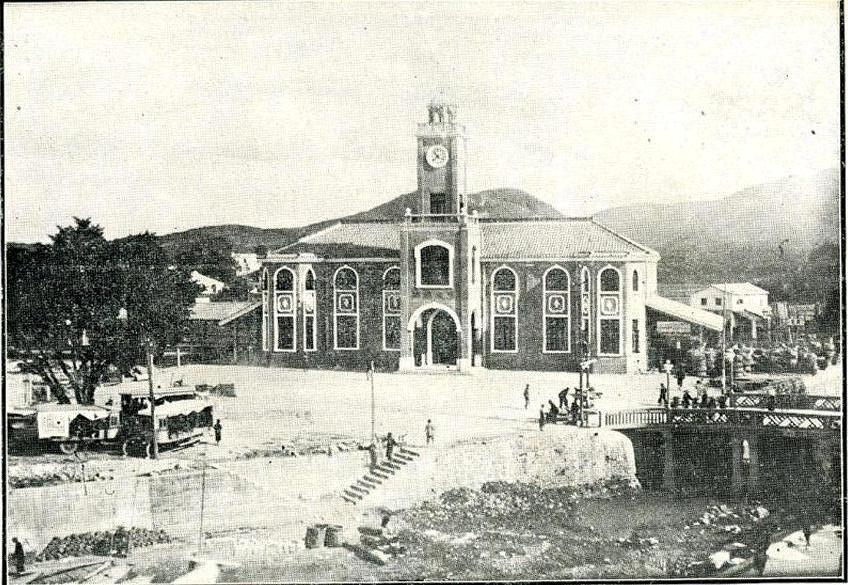
Xinning Railway Station

In 1906, under the oversight of Chin Gee Hee, the Sun Ning Railway Company began building a railway to connect Xinning County to its northern and southern neighbors. On March 1, 1909, the Xinning Railway Station (Chinese: 新宁铁路总站) was opened in what is now the subdistrict. The rail line, which was completed in 1920, drew attention both domestically and internationally for being the first Chinese-funded and Chinese-constructed railroad in the world.

In 1938, the railway was ordered by the Nationalist Government to be destroyed to prevent the advance of invading Japanese troops. The station would subsequently serve as a bus station.

The new Taishan Railway Station was constructed in 2018 within the village of Nankeng, Taicheng Subdistrict. The station lies upon the Shenzhen–Zhanjiang high-speed railway.

== Design ==
=== Station building ===
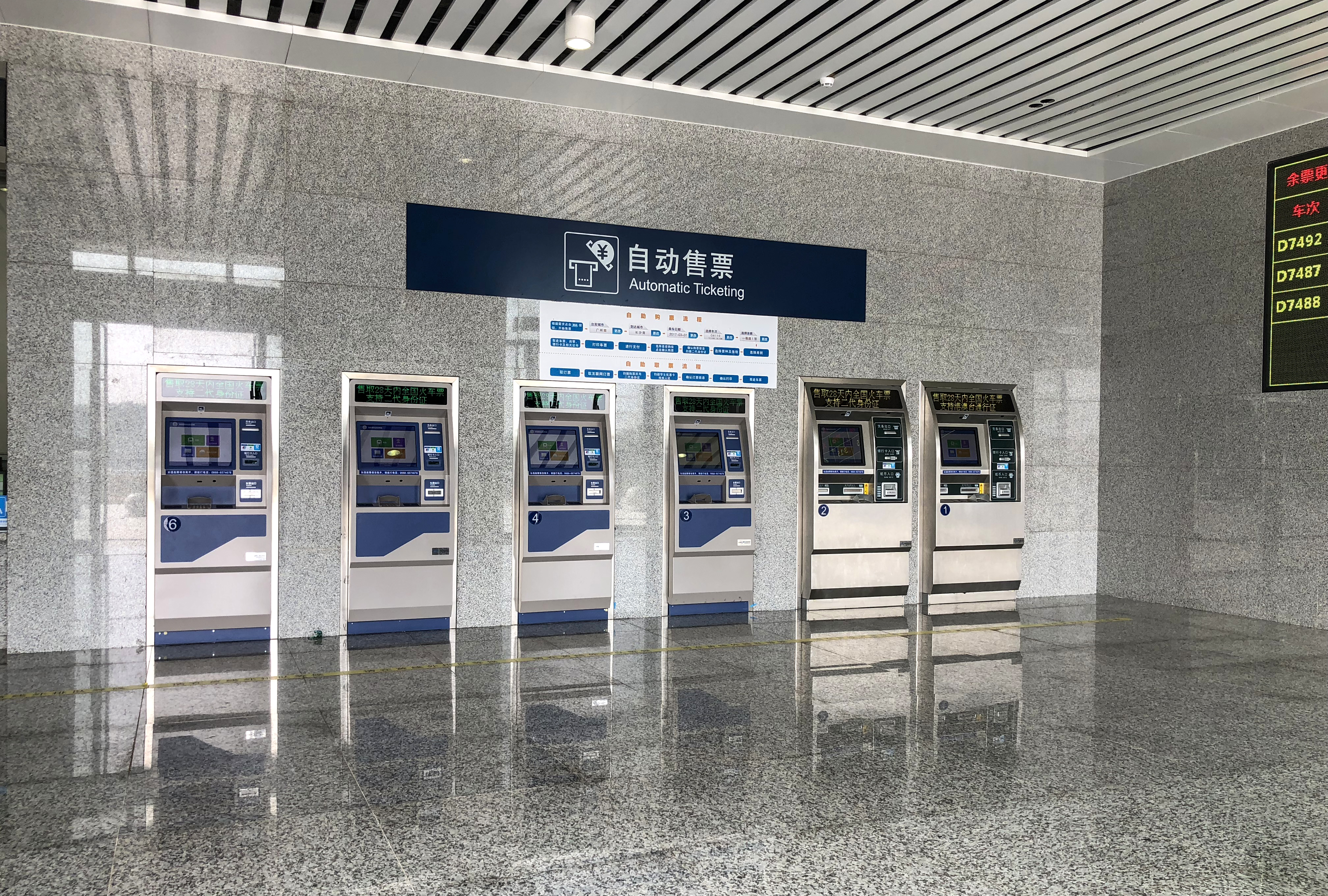
Ticket Vending Machines

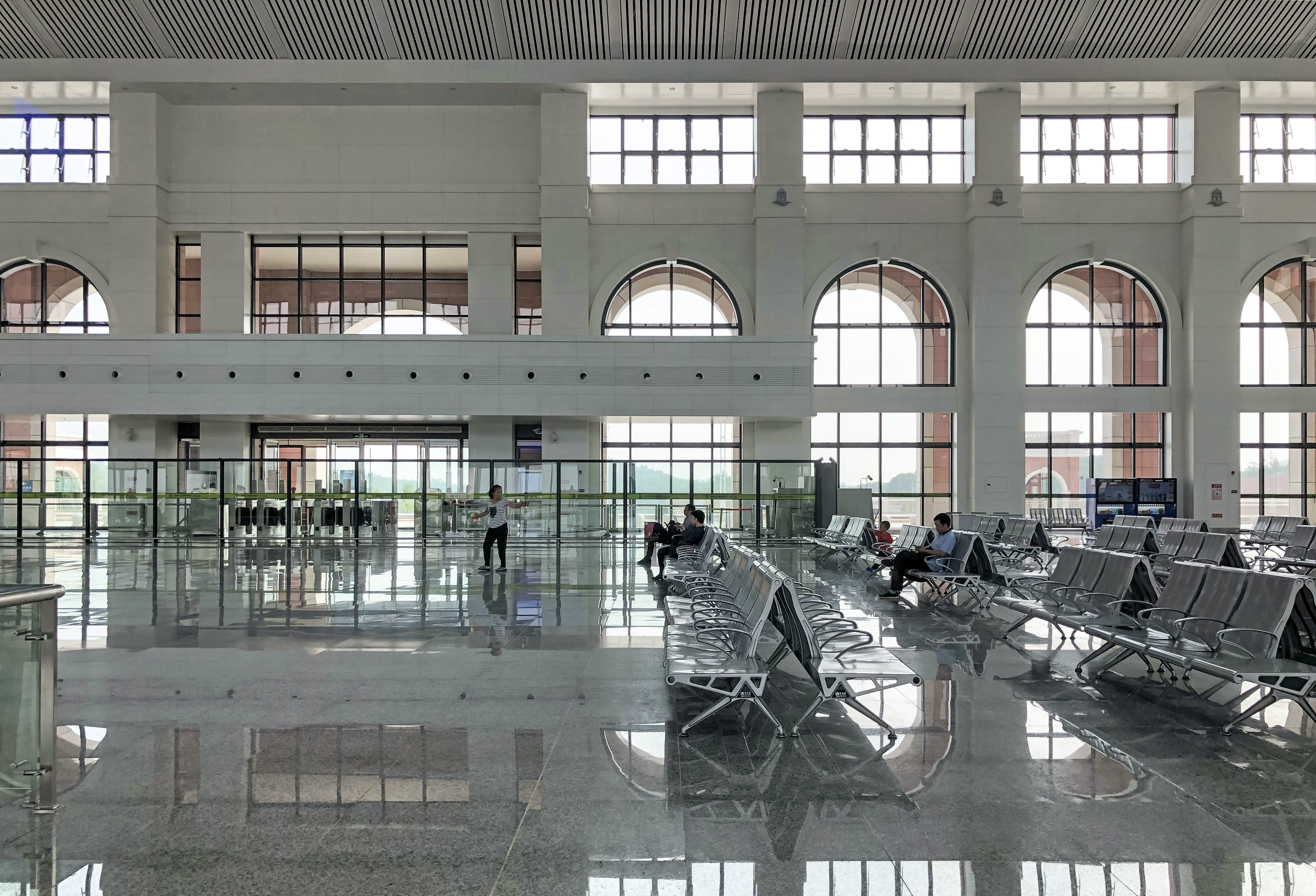
Concourse

The building is approximately 8,000 square meters in size, and the station's platform area is approximately 12,000 square meters.

The railway station was designed to replicate the original design of the Xinning Railway Station, with Western-style brickwork and Chinese-styled roofing.

=== Platforms ===
Taishan Station has 2 platforms with 5 lines in total.

== Transportation links ==
The station is close to a number of expressways, such as the Zhongshan-Kaiping Expressway, the Xinhui-Taishan Expressway, and National Highway 240.
