= Duanfen =

Duanfen 端芬镇
- Town
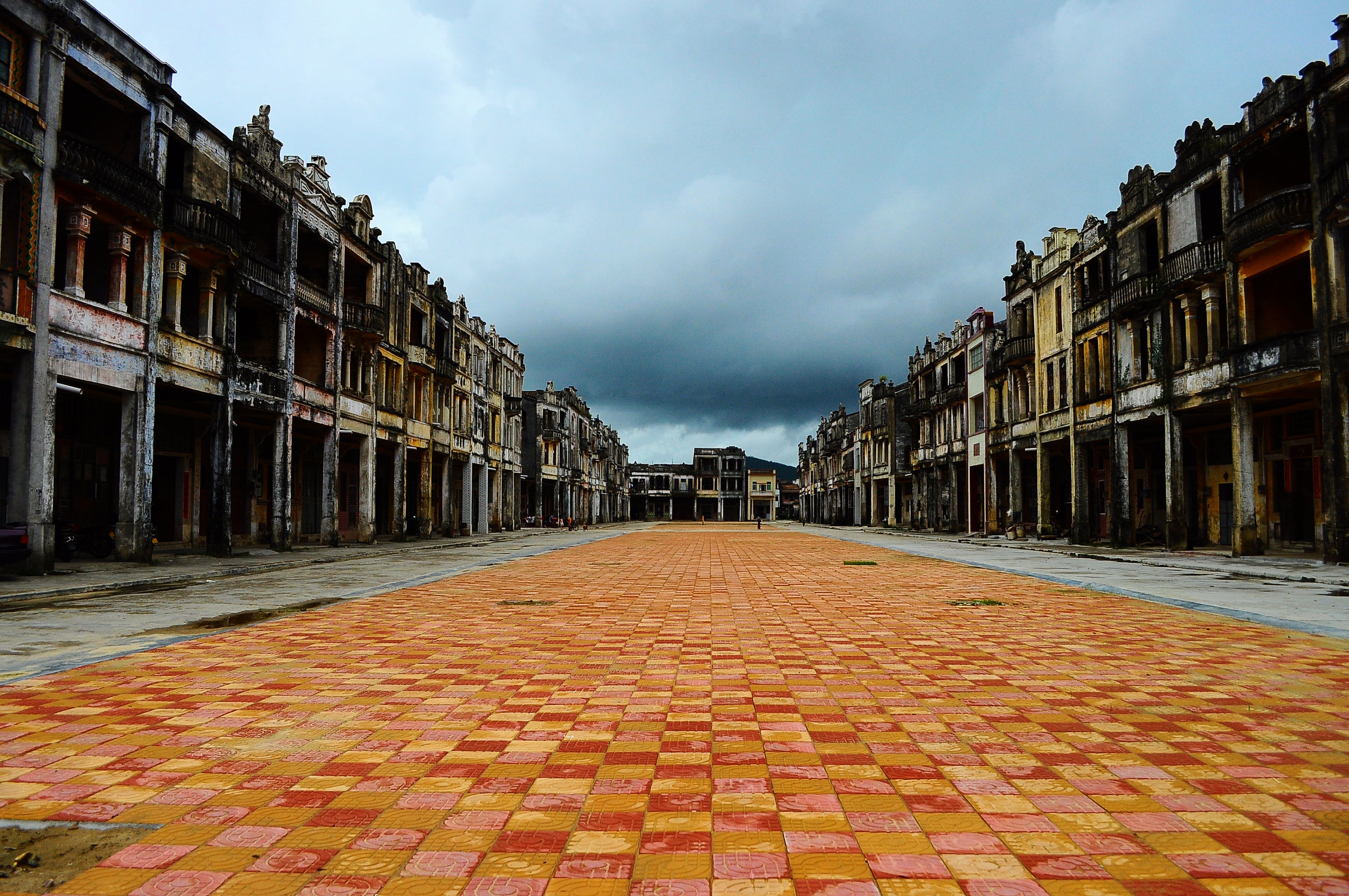
- 1930s architecture of Moy's Grand Courtyard in Duanfen

- Location in Guangdong
- Coordinates: 22°03′33″N 112°45′35″E
- Country: People's Republic of China
- Province: Guangdong
- Prefecture-level city: Jiangmen
- County-level city: Taishan

Area
  - Total: 300 km^{2} (120 sq mi)

Population
  - Total: 60,600
  - Density: 200/km^{2} (520/sq mi)
- Time zone: UTC+8 (China Standard)
- Postal code: 529200
- Area code: 0750

Duanfen (Chinese: 端芬; pinyin: Duānfēn; Jyutping: dyun^{1}fan^{1}) is a town in Taishan, in the southwest of Guangdong province, China. It is located 26 km (16 mi) south of Taicheng Subdistrict.

== History ==
In 1932, returning overseas-Chinese founded a middle school in Duanfen. It was the first in Taishan.

Duanfen experienced an earthquake on May 20, 1936.

== Geography ==
The town covers 300 km^{2} (120 sq mi) with 17 village committees.

== Demographics ==
Duanfen has a population of 60,600, while 118,000 original inhabitants live overseas.

== Economy ==
Much of Duanfen's economy is industrially based, with two industry zones composed of 18 foreign and 12 domestic investors. These industries comprise grain processing, chemical, electronics, and appliance manufacturing, and clothing and accessory production.

Agriculture includes rice, livestock, eels, and bamboo shoots.

There is an architectural tourism industry in Duanfen. Constructed by returning overseas Chinese, heritage western-style arcade buildings and courtyards include Moy's Grand Courtyard (梅家大院), and Wong's Buildings (翁家楼).
