= China Club of Seattle =

American organization

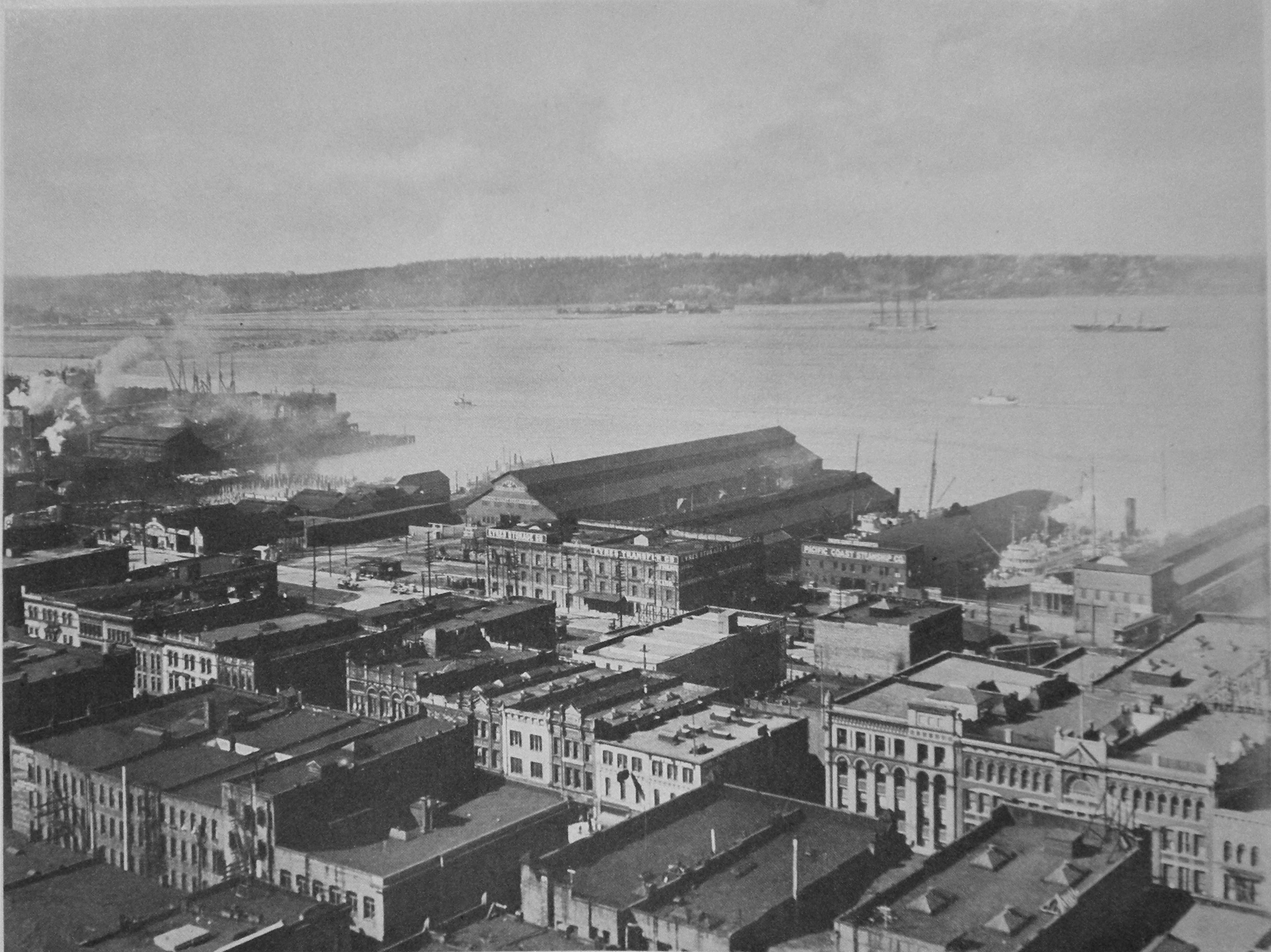
Seattle ocean dock and environs circa 1916

The China Club of Seattle, founded in 1916 by Judge Thomas Burke, was an advocate for American investment in China and the development of Seattle's trade with Asia, as well as a cultural and political organization. The China Club's economic goals included the expansion and renovation of Seattle's port, the development of Chinese infrastructure, and the creation of connections between American businesses and contacts within China. These efforts were ultimately intended to provide American businesses with access to and domination over Chinese markets. Its cultural programs, focused in higher education, were largely connected to its economic programs. The Club's political advocacy originally focused on the creation of legislation regulating and prohibiting the use and sale of opiates. During World War II, it would become involved in anti-Japanese protests, and It became an advocate for support of Taiwan after the Chinese Civil War.

== Background and Formation ==
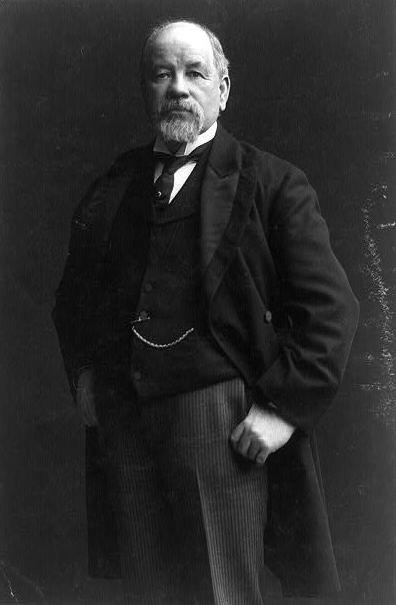
Judge Thomas Burke, c. 1910

The immediate cause for the founding of the China Club of Seattle was a speech delivered by Julean Arnold, an American commercial attaché to Beijing, to members of the Seattle business community in 1916. Arnold and the Club's first President, Thomas Burke, were both part of a movement of the late 19th and early 20th centuries that argued for the economic and cultural importance of developing trade networks between China and the West Coast of the United States and Canada. Two of Burke's former clients, James J. Hill and Chin Gee Hee, had been early advocates for the creation of economic links between China and Seattle. Their approach was to improve infrastructure connecting the American East and Midwest to China through the nexus of ports in the Pacific Northwest with the intention of creating a new market for American produce and manufactured goods in China and was largely adopted by the China Club of Seattle after its founding.

The China Club of Seattle was also influenced by the local economy, which relied on shipping and the export of timber. This made it easier for Seattle to grow through the domestic and international trade expansion advocated by the Club.

The actions of the China Club should also be viewed in relation to the prominence of the Open Door Policy, and the broader rise of liberalism, in U.S. foreign policy. This context is reflected in the Club's advocacy for tariff reduction and its negative view of spheres of influence in China.

== Economic goals and business advocacy ==
=== Infrastructure and Trade ===
To further American trade with China, the China Club employed both domestic lobbying campaigns and international outreach programs. Domestically, the Club focused on improving maritime infrastructure, reducing trade barriers, and increasing trade subsidies. It was most successful in improving Seattle's capacity to ship grain and wheat products into the Asia-Pacific region, something that had been important to the group's predecessors. The China Club also advocated the expansion of the American merchant marine's presence in China and the fostering of a larger and more independent Chinese merchant marine. These two policies were rooted in distinct and somewhat contradictory American fears. Support for increasing the American merchant marine's share of the pacific trade stemmed from fears that, as in Europe during World War I, American businesses could experience trouble trading with belligerents in the event of a war in Asia unless neutral American vessels could be used. Support for a large, independent Chinese merchant marine, which would necessarily have limited the scale of American shippers in the Pacific, grew from fears about spheres of influence and the possibility of European powers excluding the United States from doing business in Chinese markets. That fear, along with liberal concerns for tariff rates and efficiency of transportation, moved the China Club of Seattle to push for the internationalization of Chinese railroads to allow them to pass through the spheres of influence of rival colonial powers.

In addition to its lobbying efforts, the China Club sent several delegations to the Asia Pacific region to facilitate connections between local actors and American investors. At least four of these trips occurred: one to China, Japan, and Korea which was organized in conjunction with the Seattle Chamber of Commerce; another in 1916 to Southeast China with the intention of examining the region's countryside; a third in 1924 to view Chin Gee Hee's new port and railroad in Guangdong; and a fourth in the late 1950s organized with the Grange to create ties between farmers in Washington state and Taiwan.

=== Education and internationalism ===
The China Club of Seattle was responsible for the creation of a number of programs and scholarships for Chinese students to attend universities in Washington. The first scholarships it created were 25 industrial scholarships to the University of Washington. Begun in 1919 and eventually expanded to cover 100 students, the scholarships connected Chinese students with corporations which would provide them with $50 to fund their education in exchange for two years of work for the firm and service as representatives for the firm's interests in China after graduation. The students enrolled in this program were chosen by a committee in Shanghai composed of Julean Arnold, C.C. Nieh, David Yui, and E.S. Cunningham. The China Club was also responsible for the creation of a course on written Chinese and a club for Chinese students called the Péngyou Club, both at the University of Washington. It also pushed the Southern Branch of the University of California System to begin offering similar scholarships.

In concert with these scholarships and more direct efforts to establish connections between American businesses and China, the Club lobbied for modifications to be made to the Chinese Exclusion Act. These changes would have created exemptions for certain classes of immigrants, such as merchants, teachers, and students, allowing them easier ingress to the United States.

== Politics ==
=== Anti-narcotics legislation ===
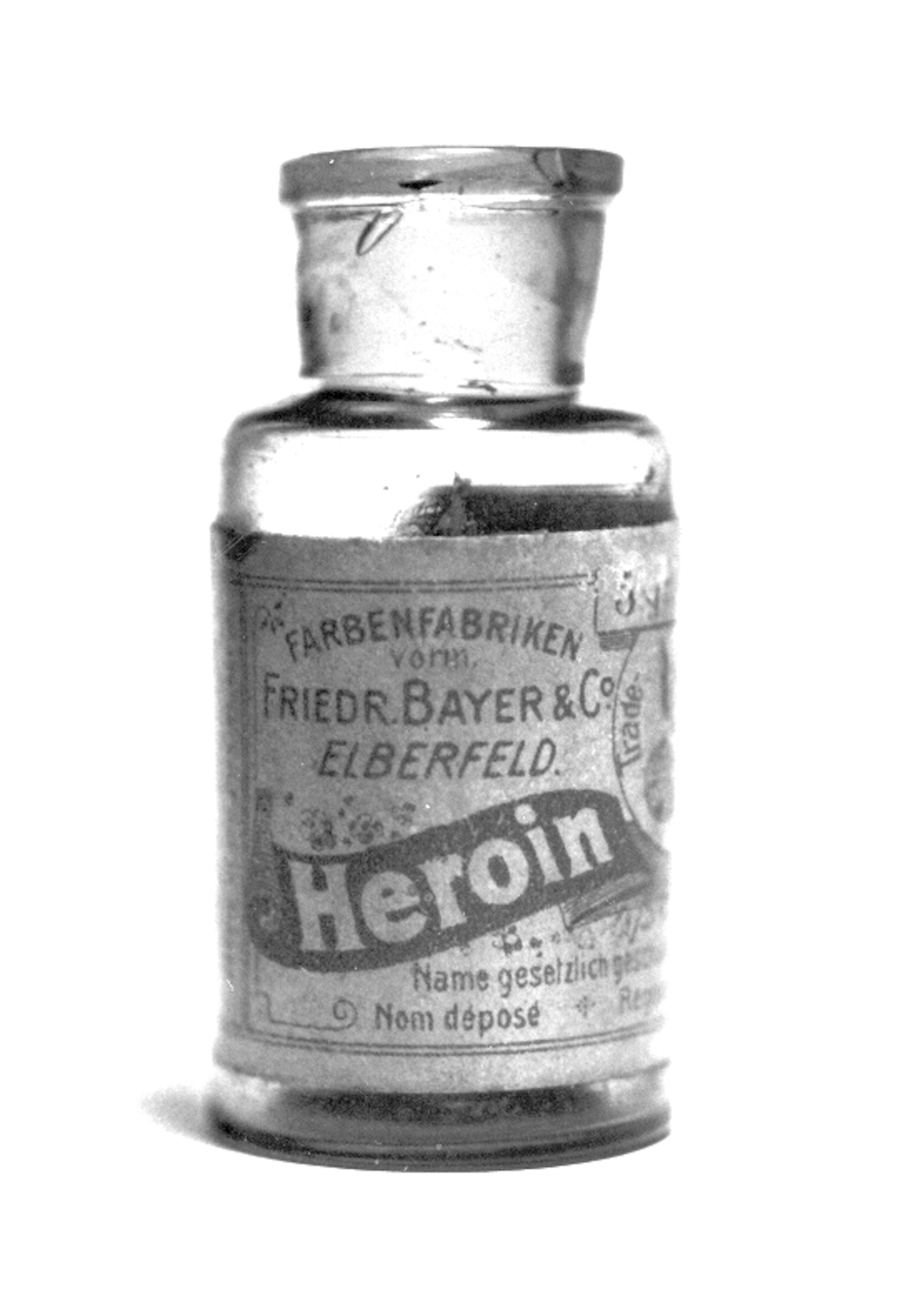
Bayer heroin bottle

Although it originally focused on economic policy, the China Club of Seattle was also involved in early efforts to legislate the use of narcotics, especially opiates, in the United States. In the view of the club and its members, the core of the opium problem was the British Empire, which grew, processed and sold opiates to its colonial populations. As such, the group began its anti-narcotic efforts by pressuring the Treasury Department to add more states to the list of those affected by the Harrison Anti-Narcotic Act, which stipulated that opiates could not be sent from U.S. ports to states without laws regulating their sale. Later, the club would lobby for and help draft laws such as the Jones-Miller Act (1922), which raised the maximum sentence for those convicted under the Harrison Act to 10 years and created the Federal Narcotics Control Board, as well as the Porter Act (1923), which prohibited the sale and manufacture of heroin.

=== International issues ===
Other political interest of the China Club of Seattle have revolved around political and humanitarian issues affecting China. In 1931, the Club became involved in movements protesting the Japanese invasion of Manchuria, especially the sale of American scrap iron to Japan during the conflict. In 1948, the Club nearly dissolved because of the defeat of Republic of China forces in mainland China, but instead shifted its focus to the provision of aid to and the economic development of Taiwan.

== Contemporary China Club ==
Today, the China Club of Seattle is a less active and influential organization. It holds 5 cultural and political events every year, generally holding them at Chinese restaurants in the Seattle area.
