= Chin Chun Hock =

First Chinese man to settle in Seattle, Washington, US

- Born: July 15, 1844; Taishan, Guangdong
- Died: February 13, 1927 (aged 82)
- Occupation: Businessman
- Years active: 1868–1927

Chin Chun Hock (July 15, 1844–February 13, 1927; Chinese: 陳程學; Jyutping: can4 cing4 hok6, also sometimes transcribed as Chin Ching-hock or Chun Ching Hock) was a businessman who was the first known Chinese resident of Seattle.

== Early life and arrival ==
Chin Chun Hock was born on July 15, 1844 in Taishan, Guangdong. In 1860 he immigrated to Seattle via San Francisco, initially working at a cookhouse. That same year, he was the only listed Chinese person on Seattle's census. He worked in Seattle for several years before visiting his family in China. Upon his return to Seattle in 1868, he opened a store named the Wa Chong Company.

== Time in Seattle ==
The Wa Chong Company was primarily an import-export business facilitating trade between the United States and China. In 1873, Chin Gee Hee purchased a portion of the store and became partners with Hock. Hee helped shift the business away from the sale of merchandise and towards labor contracting, with the company actively recruiting Chinese laborers to work in the United States. This shift in focus would eventually result in the end of their partnership, with Hock purchasing Hee's share of the business in 1889.

In 1880, Hock sued the city of Seattle in a dispute over tax warrants. The case was lengthy, eventually being resolved in 1891 with Hock being awarded $24,661.37 (equivalent to $883,699 in 2025). Hock returned to China in 1885 and spent several years working to secure a contract with the Chinese government to construct a railroad network. He returned to Seattle in 1889 and resumed his management of the Wa Chong Company. After the Great Seattle Fire that year, the Wa Chong Company constructed some of the first brick buildings in Seattle. The Wa Chong Company was a hub for the Chinese community in Seattle, moving locations as the Chinese community moved. The company eventually settled in the East Kong Yick Building in 1910, where it would remain until its dissolution in 1953.

Hock left for China on business again in 1893, this time spending three years in the country. Upon his return in 1896, Hock was elected a member of the Seattle Metropolitan Chamber of Commerce.

Over the course of his career, Hock became one of the most prominent landowners in Seattle. While the United States banned foreign citizens from owning property at the time, there was no law against businesses owning land, a loophole Hock used to amass sizable land holdings.

== Return to China and death ==
In 1900, Hock moved back to China and established a residency in Canton. Despite the distance, he remained active in the Wa Chong Company's operations. Hock was involved in the sale of opium and, in 1904, sued the United States Marshals Service for allegedly misweighing opium imports. In 1906, Hock negotiated for the construction of a saw mill in Hong Kong. By 1916, Hock was a full-time resident of Hong Kong, where he remained active in business activities.

Hock visited Seattle several times after returning to China. In 1924 he visited the city and told a Seattle Times reporter that "Seattle looks good to me." He stayed in Seattle until February 1927, when he returned to China to celebrate the Chinese New Year. He died of influenza on February 13, 1927.

== Personal life ==
Hock was married multiple times, with one of his grandchildren reporting that he had "several wives, 11 concubines, 7 sons, and 12 daughters."
