= Bihou =

Bihou 庇厚 Peihou
- Natural Village
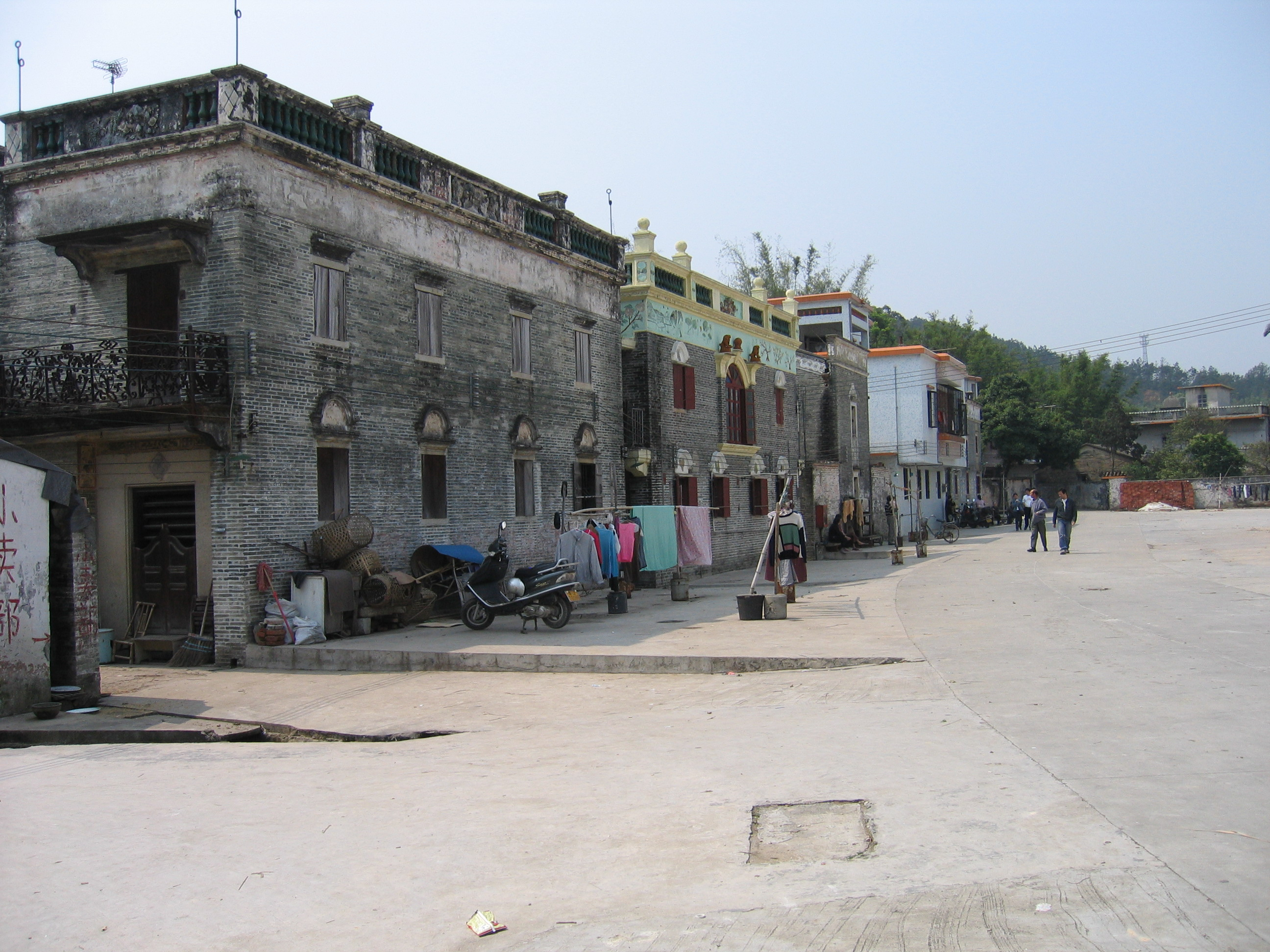
- Bihou Streetscape

- Location within Guangdong
- Coordinates: 22.2489234°N 112.7630542°E
- Country: People's Republic of China
- Province: Guangdong
- Prefecture-level City: Jiangmen
- County-level City: Taishan
- Subdistrict: Taicheng Subdistrict
- Residential Community: Hexin Residential Community

Bihou (Chinese: 庇厚; pinyin: Bìhòu; Jyutping: bei3hau5) or Pei Hou, is a natural village located in Hexin Residential Community (Chinese: 合新社区; pinyin: Héxīn Shèqū) in Taicheng Subdistrict, Taishan, in Guangdong province, southern China. The village is located at latitude 22.2489234°N and longitude 112.7630542°E, 11 metres (36 ft) above sea level, off Guishui Road (桂水路).

Rice, fish, bananas, pawpaw and pig feed are grown around the village.

== History ==
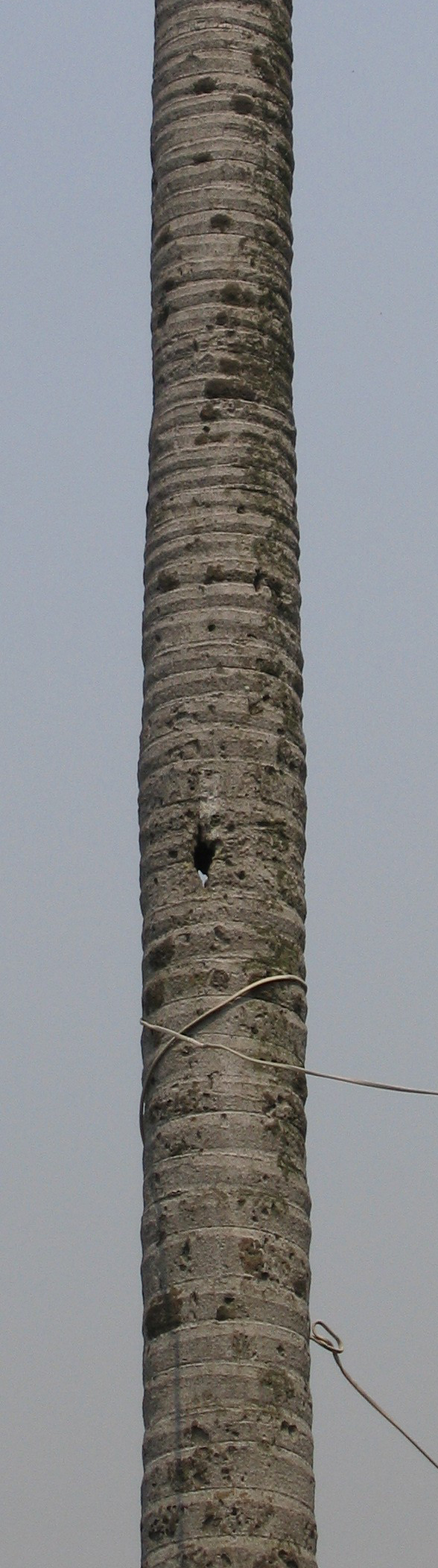
Japanese Bullet Hole

Bihou was founded in the 18th century by Tan Gong Chang (譚公昌), one of the many descendants of the viscounts of the feudal State of Tan (1046BC-684BC) in present-day Shandong Province.

All of its inhabitants are still of one patrilineage with the clan name of Tan (譚), and have family in Taicheng and Yangjiang. Expatriate family members have settled in Australia and the United States.

On March 3, 1941, Japanese troops attacked the village as part of the assault on the neighboring Taicheng Township. Bullet holes are still visible in the fabric of the now-defunct village clan school, and through one of the neighboring palm trees.

== Education ==
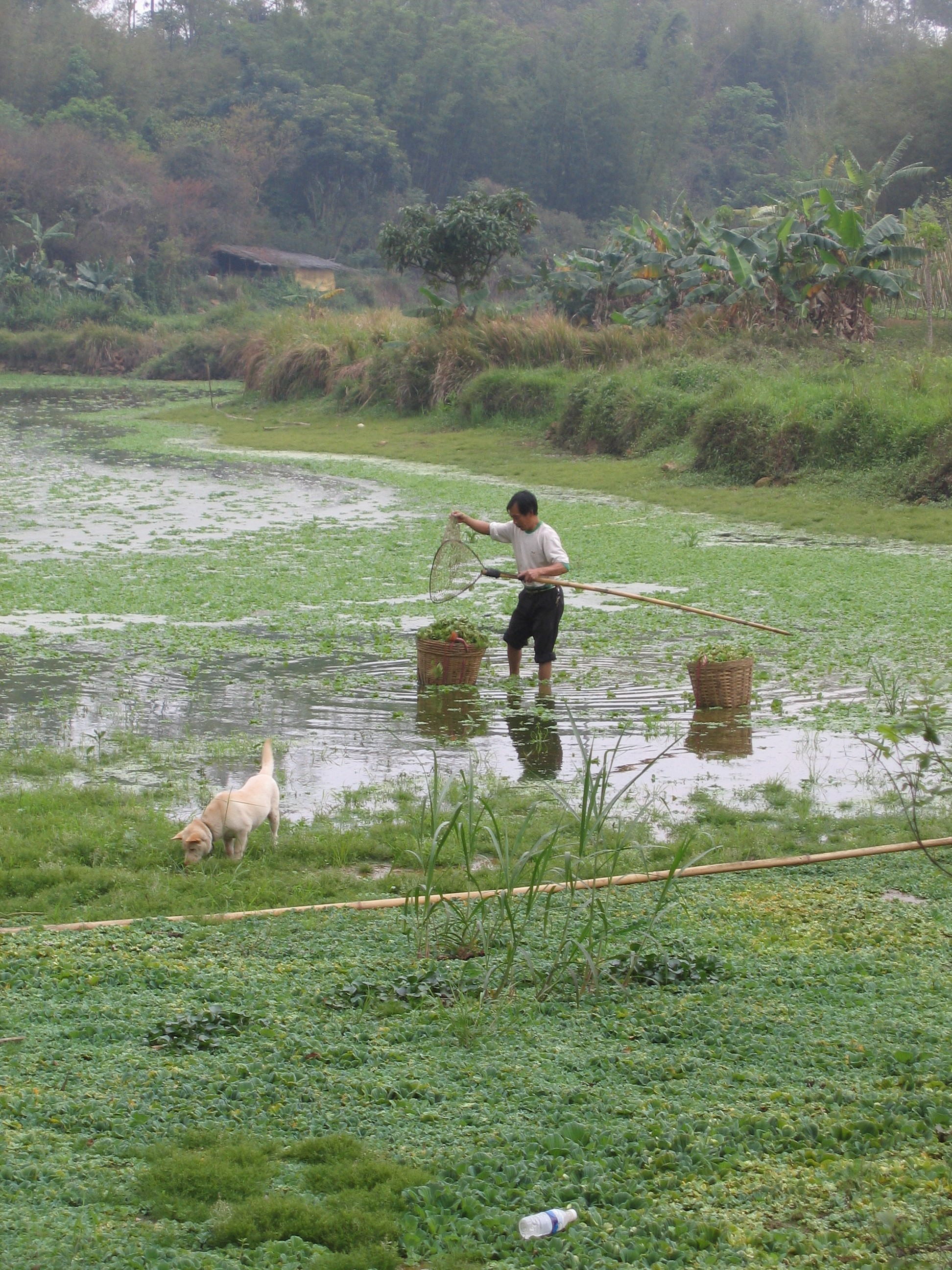
Fish Pond

The children of Bihou and a dozen other villages attend the Chengxi Kaizhi Primary School (城西开智小学).

== Culture ==
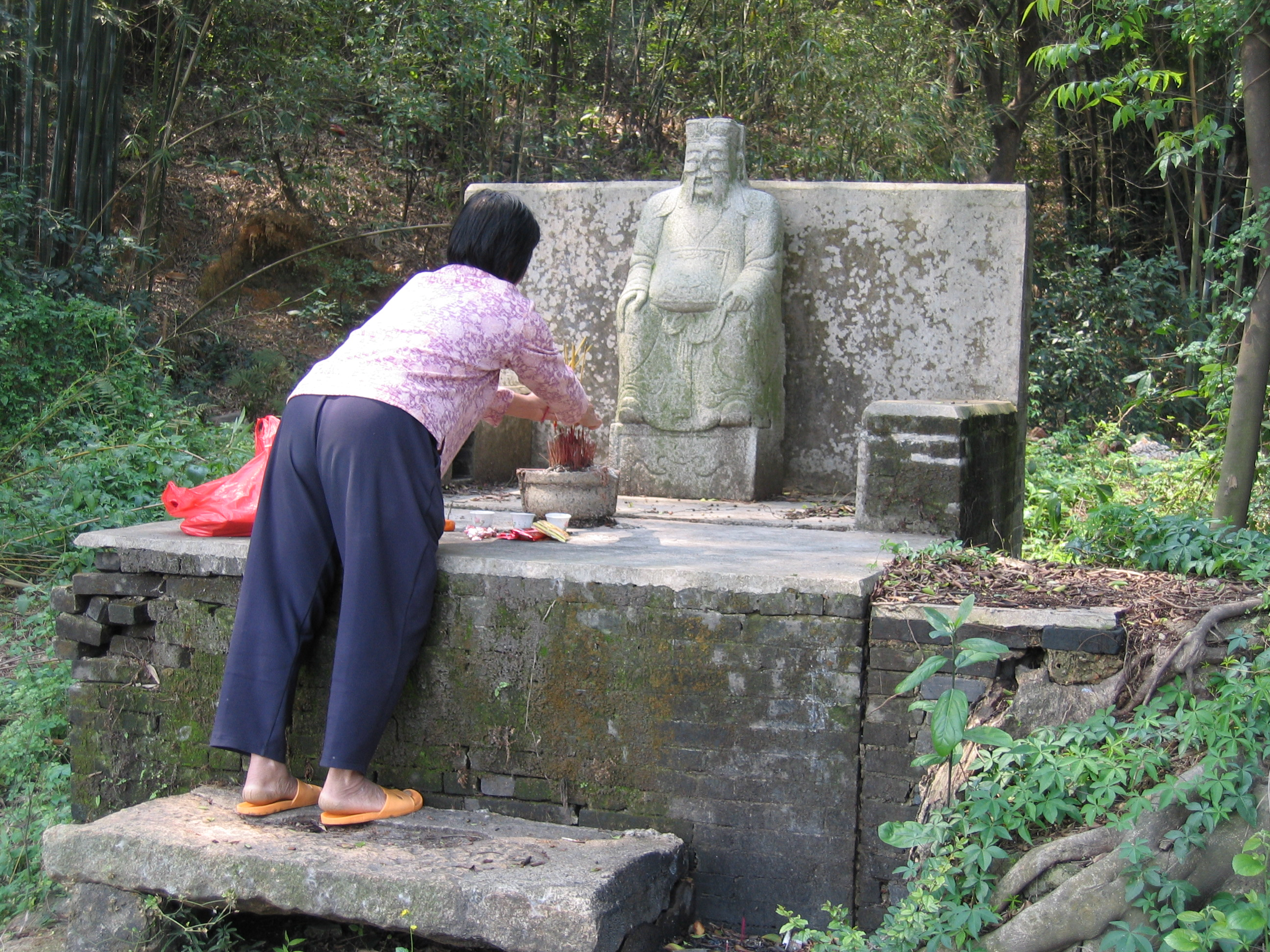
Guardian Altar

The village hosts the Bihou Village Cultural Building (庇厚村文化楼), which was opened some years ago, when it was reported in the local media.

The village hosted a celebration of the Double Ninth Festival, which included a parade, song, and dance, and was largely meant to celebrate the elderly. As part of the festival, the village's married women donned qipaos, performed a lion dance, and partook in a number of other traditions for an audience of the village elders.
