= Taichang (disambiguation) =

Taichang is the chief official in charge of religious rites and rituals in ancient China.

Taichang may also refer to:

- Taichang, Gansu (太昌镇), a town in Ning County, Gansu, China

== Historical eras ==
- Taichang (泰常, 416–423), era name used by Emperor Mingyuan of Northern Wei
- Taichang (太昌, 532), era name used by Emperor Xiaowu of Northern Wei
- Taichang (泰昌, 1620), era name used by the Taichang Emperor (Emperor Guangzong of Ming)
