= Doushan =

Doushan 斗山镇 Towshan
- Town
- Location in Guangdong
- Coordinates: 22°03′35″N 112°49′55″E
- Country: People's Republic of China
- Province: Guangdong
- Prefecture-level city: Jiangmen
- County-level city: Taishan

Population (2019)
  - Total: 52,436
- Time zone: UTC+8 (China Standard)
- Postal code: 529200
- Area code: 0750

Doushan (simplified Chinese: 斗山镇; traditional Chinese: 斗山鎮; pinyin: Dòushān; Jyutping: dau^{2}saan^{1}) is a town of Taishan in southwestern Guangdong province, China. As of 2011, it has 1 residential community (社区) and 18 villages under its administration.

There are approximately 88,000 overseas Chinese from Doushan living in over 90 countries and regions. It is also notable for its eel farming.

== History ==
Doushan was founded as a marketplace for farmers to transport goods down the Doushan River.

== Notable people ==
- Chen Yixi (1844–1929), founder of the Sun Ning Railway Co.
- Huang Xinbo (1916–1980), printmaker
