= Guanghai =

Guanghai 广海镇
- Town
- Location in Guangdong
- Coordinates: 21°57′46″N 112°47′44″E
- Country: People's Republic of China
- Province: Guangdong
- Prefecture-level city: Jiangmen
- County-level city: Taishan

Guanghai
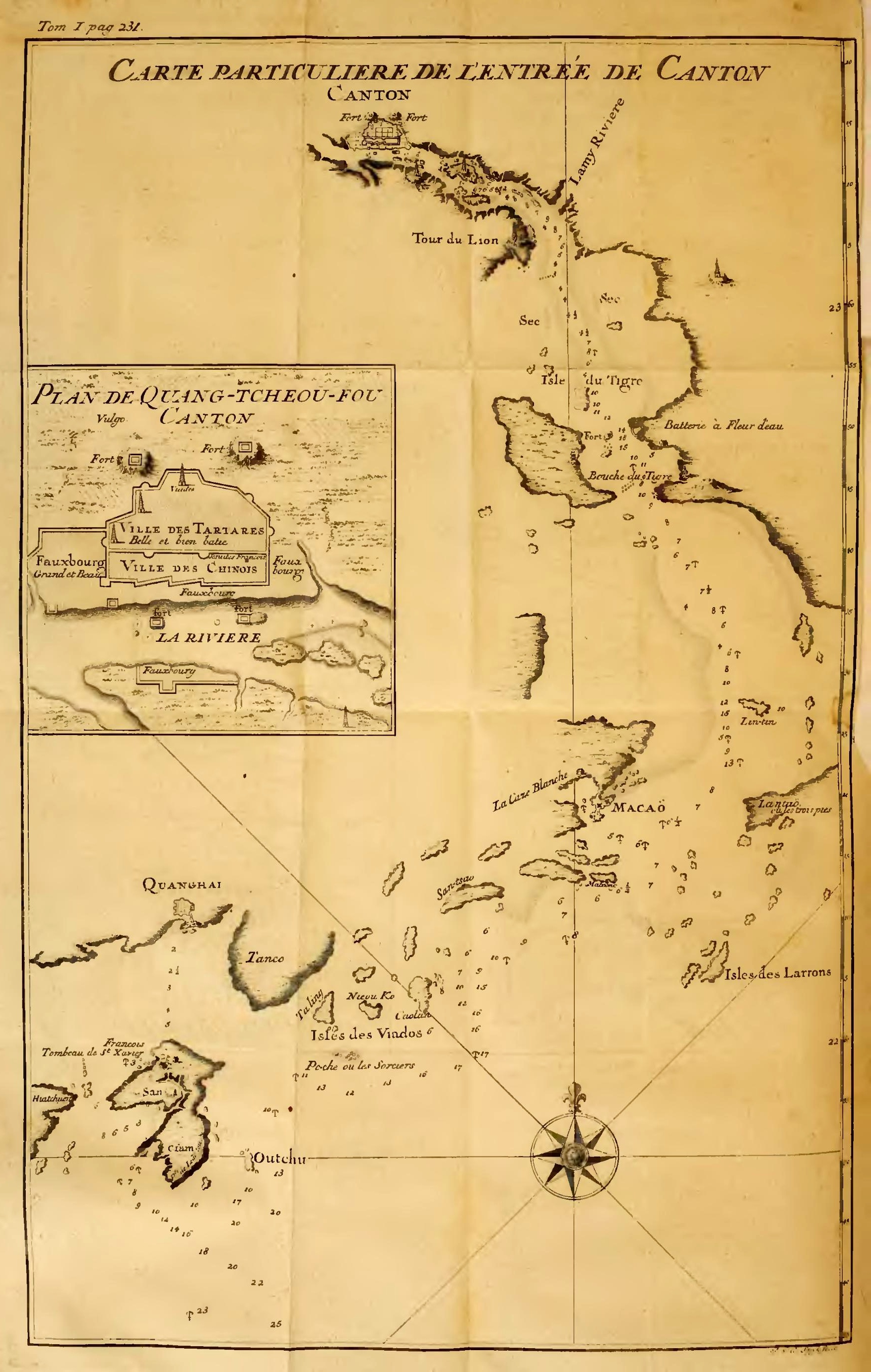
- The map of the Pearl River Delta in Du Halde's 1735 Description of China, noting "Quanghai" as a major settlement
- Traditional Chinese: 廣海
- Simplified Chinese: 广海
- Literal meaning: Expansive Sea
Transcriptions
Standard Mandarin
- Hanyu Pinyin: Guǎnghǎi
- Wade–Giles: Kuang-hai

Guanghai is a town in Taishan City in Guangdong, China.
