= Haiyan, Guangdong =

Coordinates: 21°49′36″N 112°33′08″E

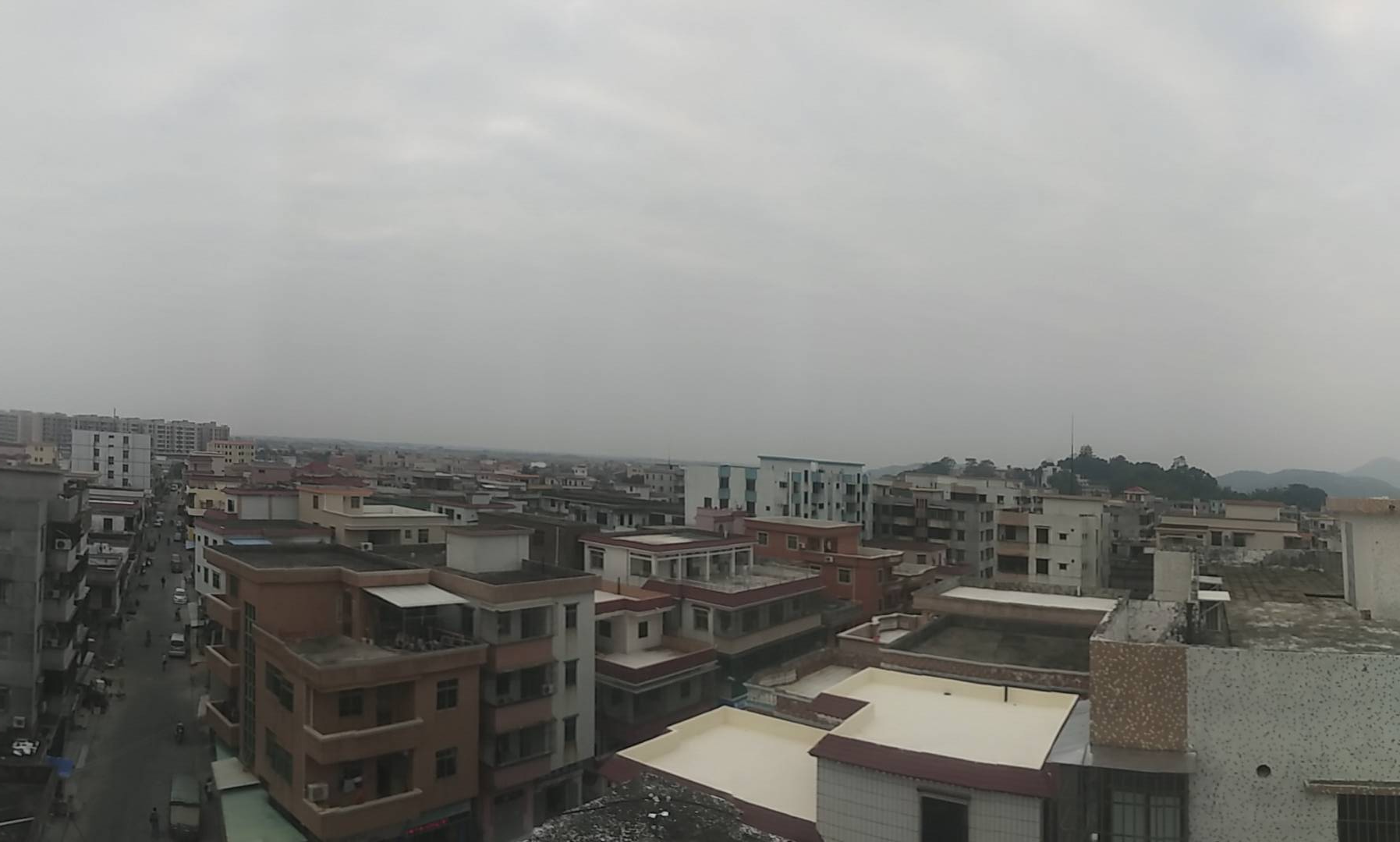

Haiyan (Chinese: 海宴; pinyin: Hǎiyàn) is a town under the jurisdiction of Taishan, in Guangdong Province of southern China.

Haiyan contains an overseas Chinese farm (华侨农场).
