= Sanhe, Taishan =

Sanhe 三合
- Town
- 三合镇
- Location within Guangdong
- Coordinates: 22°11′13″N 112°43′05″E
- Country: China
- Province: Guangdong
- Prefecture-level city: Jiangmen
- County-level city: Taishan

Area
  - Total: 250 km^{2} (97 sq mi)
- Elevation: 44 m (144 ft)

Population (2008)
  - Total: 47,790
  - Density: 190/km^{2} (500/sq mi)
- Time zone: UTC+8 (China Standard)
- Postal code: 529249
- Area code: 0750

Sanhe (Chinese: 三合; pinyin: Sānhé; Jyutping: saam^{1}hap^{6}) is a town in the southwest of Guangdong province in Southern China. It is under the jurisdiction of Taishan City, and as of 2008, had a population of 48000. The town is located around 11 kilometres (6.8 mi) southwest of Taishan. As of 2018, it has one residential community and 9 villages under its administration.
