= Sijiu =

- Town
- 四九镇
- Location within Guangdong
- Coordinates: 22°12′43.1″N 112°51′47.56″E
- Country: China
- Province: Guangdong
- Prefecture-level city: Jiangmen
- County-level city: Taishan

Area
  - Total: 260 km^{2} (100 sq mi)

Population
  - Total: 43,000
  - Density: 170/km^{2} (430/sq mi)
- Time zone: UTC+8 (China Standard)
- Postal code: 529222
- Area code: 0750

Sijiu is a town in the southwest Guangdong Province in Southern China. It is under the administration of Taishan County in Jiangmen Prefecture. As of 2014, the population included about 50,000 "foreigners", mainly from Hong Kong, Macao, and Taiwan. About 50 "foreign" businesses are established here, including 20 Taiwanese enterprises involved in light manufacturing located along what is known locally as the "Taiwanese Merchant Street".

== Name ==
Sijiu is the atonal pinyin romanization of the Standard Mandarin pronunciation Sījiù of the Chinese name 四九, meaning "4-9" or "4th-&-9th", from locals' previous custom of gathering for trade in the town on the 4th and 9th days of the months of the traditional lunisolar calendar. The same name was previously written Ssu-chiu in Wade-Giles romanization and is written as Sei³ Gau² in the Jyutping romanization of its Cantonese pronunciation.
