= Tan (surname) =

Tan (譚/谭)
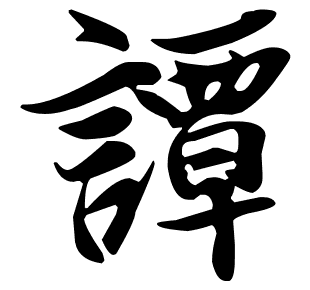
- Pronunciation: Tan (Hokkien Chinese and Mandarin Chinese); Tan (Japanese); Dam (Korean); Đàm (Vietnamese); Tam (Cantonese Chinese and Hakka Chinese); Tham (Hokkien Chinese and Teochew Chinese); Ham, Hom, Hum, Tom, Thom (Toisanese Chinese)
- Language: Chinese

Origin
- Region of origin: China, Indonesia, Malaysia, Singapore, Vietnam

Tan
- Traditional Chinese: 譚
- Simplified Chinese: 谭
Transcriptions

Tan is a common Chinese surname 譚. It is the 56th most commonly borne surname in China.

== Origin ==
Two origins have been suggested for the Tan surname:

- The surname came from the ancient State of Tan which was located in the western part of what is now Shandong Province. During the Spring and Autumn period, this state was conquered by the neighbouring State of Qi. The court changed their surname to Tan in remembrance of their defeated homeland, and later prospered in Hunan Province.
- The surname came from the less common surname 談, another with the same pronunciation in Mandarin Chinese and Cantonese Chinese. In order to avoid the revenge of their enemies, the clan leaders changed it to 譚.

A study by geneticist Yuan Yida has found that people with either of the two Tan surnames are especially concentrated in Hunan Province which would tend to support these accounts. This does not mean that they are the most common surnames in that province.

== Romanisation and pronunciation ==
Tan is the Chinese character's Hanyu Pinyin romanisation in Mandarin Chinese. It is pronounced and romanised differently in different languages and dialects.

- In Cantonese Chinese, it is romanised as Taam4 in Jyutping and Tàahm in Cantonese Yale. It is romanised as Tam in Hong Kong and Macau.
- In Toisanese Chinese, it may be romanised as Thom, Hom, Ham or Hum.
- In Hokkien Chinese, Teochew Chinese and Hainanese Chinese, it is romanised as Thâm in POJ.
- In Malaysia, Indonesia and Singapore (Overseas Chinese communities), it is sometimes romanised as Tham.
- In Filipino (Tagalog) and other Philippine languages (Overseas Chinese communities), it is romanised as Tam.

== Prominent people ==
=== Tam ===
- Adrian Tam, (譚家昇), American politician representing Waikiki and Ala Moana
- Alan Tam, (譚詠麟), Hong Kong singer and actor
- Jeremy Tam Man Ho (譚文豪, born 1975), Hong Kong politician
- Tam Kung, (譚公), Chinese folk hero who was reputed to be able to forecast the weather
- Patrick Tam Kar Ming (譚家明, born 1948), Hong Kong film director and editor
- Patrick Tam Yiu Man (譚耀文, born 1969), Hong Kong actor and singer
- Roman Tam (譚百先, stage name 羅文, 1945–2002), Hong Kong singer
- Theresa Tam (born 1965 in Hong Kong), Chief Public Health Officer of Canada
- Vivienne Tam (譚燕玉, born 1957), Hong Kong fashion designer
- Tam Yiu-chung (譚耀宗, born 1949), Hong Kong politician

=== Tham ===
- Avvir Tham Pac Lun (谭柏伦, born 2004), Singaporean diver who became the first Singaporean man in 60 years to win a SEA Games diving gold medal (2025) and competed for Singapore at the 2022 Asian Games.

=== Tan ===
- Alyssa Sheena Tan (born 1992), Filipino accountant, lawyer and politician
- Amy Tan (譚恩美, born 1952), American writer
- Esther Tan (born 1975), Singaporean adventure racing athlete
- Juan José Tan (born 1944), Peruvian football manager
- Lewis Tan (born 1987), English actor
- Meryem Tan (born 1999), Turkish wheelchair basketball player
- Tan Dun (譚盾, born 1957), Chinese composer and pianist
- Tan Jing (谭晶, born 1977), Chinese singer, philanthropist and congresswoman
- Karen Tan Puay Kiow (born 1962), Singaporean army officer
- Joseph Tan (born 1963), Filipino civil engineer and politician
- Melinda Tan, British academic
- Mely G. Tan (1930–2024), Indonesian sociologist
- Milagrosa Tan (1958–2019), Filipina politician
- Reynolds Michael Tan (born 1988), Filipino politician
- Shaun Tan (born 1974), Australian author and illustrator
- Sharee Ann Tan (born 1982), Filipino politician
- Stephen James Tan (born 1983), Filipino politician
- Tan Sitong (譚嗣同, 1865–1898), Chinese politician
- Tan Songyun (谭松韵, born 1990), Chinese actress
- Tan Sui Hoon (born 1963), Malaysian badminton player
- Tony Tan Caktiong (born 1953), Filipino businessman and investor
- Tan Yankai (譚延闓, 1880–1930) Chinese politician and Premier of the Republic of China.
- Yuanyuan Tan (譚元元, born 1977), Chinese ballet dancer; Principal Dancer at the San Francisco Ballet
- Tan Yuanchun (譚元春, 1586–1637), Chinese scholar
- Tan Zhenlin (譚震林, 1902–1983), Chinese politician
- Tan Zhonglin (譚鍾麟, 1822–1905) Qing dynasty scholar-official. Governor and viceroy of Shaanxi and Gansu Provinces.
- Tan Zhongyi (谭中怡, born 1991), Chinese chess grandmaster
- Kirsten Danielle Tan Delavin (born 1999), Filipino former actress and model

=== Tom ===
- Kiana Tom, (born 1965), American television host
- Lauren Tom, (born 1961), American actress

=== Hom ===
- Tom Hom (born 1927), American politician
- Ken Hom (born 1949), American chef
- Sharon Hom (born 1951), Hong Kong-born American human rights law professor
- Alice Y. Hom (born 1967), American LGBTQ community activist

== Clan villages ==
- Bihou

== See also ==
- List of common Chinese surnames
- Chinese surname
- Chinese given name
- Generation name
- Chinese kin
- Chinese compound surname
- Vietnamese name
