= Chonglou =

- Town

Chinese transcription(s)
- Interactive map of Chonglou
- Country: China
- Province: Guangdong
- Prefecture: Jiangmen
- Time zone: UTC+8 (China Standard Time)

Chonglou (Chinese: 冲蒌镇) is a township-level division of Taishan City, Jiangmen, Guangdong, China.

== See also ==
- List of township-level divisions of Guangdong
