= Taichang, Gansu =

Taichang 太昌镇
- Town
- Location in Gansu
- Coordinates: 35°24′1″N 107°46′26″E
- Country: People's Republic of China
- Province: Gansu
- Prefecture-level city: Qingyang
- County: Ning County
- Time zone: UTC+8 (China Standard)

Taichang (Chinese: 太昌; pinyin: Tàichāng) is a town under the administration of Ning County, Gansu, China. As of 2020, it administers the following nine villages:

- Liupu Village (刘堡村)
- Qingniu Village (青牛村)
- Goujia Village (苟家村)
- Xiaojia Village (肖家村)
- Shenming Village (申明村)
- Lianhe Village (联合村)
- Dongfeng Village (东风村)
- Yangju Village (杨咀村)
- Xiaopanhe Village (小盘河村)
