= Sun Ning Railway Company =

Railway in China

Sun Ning Railway
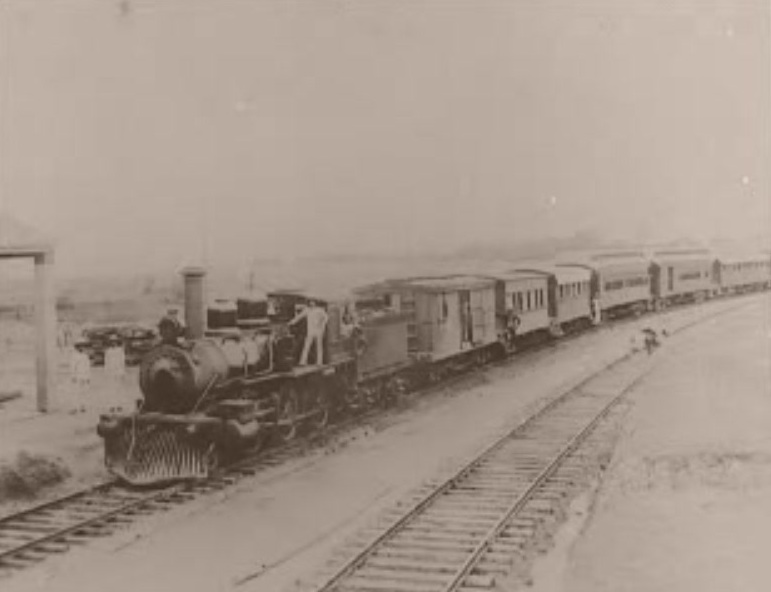

Overview
- Headquarters: Guangzhou
- Locale: South China
- Dates of operation: 1906; 120 years ago – 1938; 88 years ago

Technical
- Track gauge: 1,435 mm

Sun Ning Railway Company
- Traditional Chinese: 新寧鐵路
- Simplified Chinese: 新宁铁路
Transcriptions
Standard Mandarin
- Hanyu Pinyin: Xīnníng Tiělù
- Wade–Giles: Hsin-ning Tʻieh-lu
Yue: Cantonese
- Jyutping: San^{1}-ning^{4} Tit^{8}-lou^{6}

The Sun Ning Railway Company, also known as the Sunning Railway Co. or the Xinning Railway Co., was a standard-gauge railway in the Pearl River Delta in Guangdong Province founded in 1906 by Chin Gee Hee (陳宜禧, Chen Yixi) and Yu Shek (余灼, Yu Zhuo). It was South China's second railway and one of only three railways in pre-1949 China built solely with private Chinese capital. It was destroyed during the Second World War to prevent its use by the Japanese.

== Fundraising ==
In order to fund the railway, Chin raised $2.75 million, mainly from overseas Chinese; some sources say that further investment came from James J. Hill, but others say that at a time when railway development in China was dominated by European nations, he "vowed not to sell shares to foreigners, to borrow money from them, or to use their engineers". Chin's partner Yu Zhuo raised further funds in China and from overseas Chinese in Southeast Asia. Its benefits to Guangdong's economy were cut short when it was seized by local warlords in 1926; it was finally destroyed during the Second Sino-Japanese War in 1938.

While raising funds and building the railway, Chin encountered numerous obstacles: a magistrate tried to usurp credit for organizing the company; there were many difficulties over obtaining a right of way due to clan feuds and superstitions (geomancy); and gentry-officials repeatedly attempted extortion. Chin bought an official title to become legally one of the gentry himself, which somewhat eased the process. Still, the construction was confronted by over a hundred riots staged by local landlord forces, resulting in thirty-nine otherwise unnecessary turns, which made construction more expensive and affected speed and safety.

== Construction ==
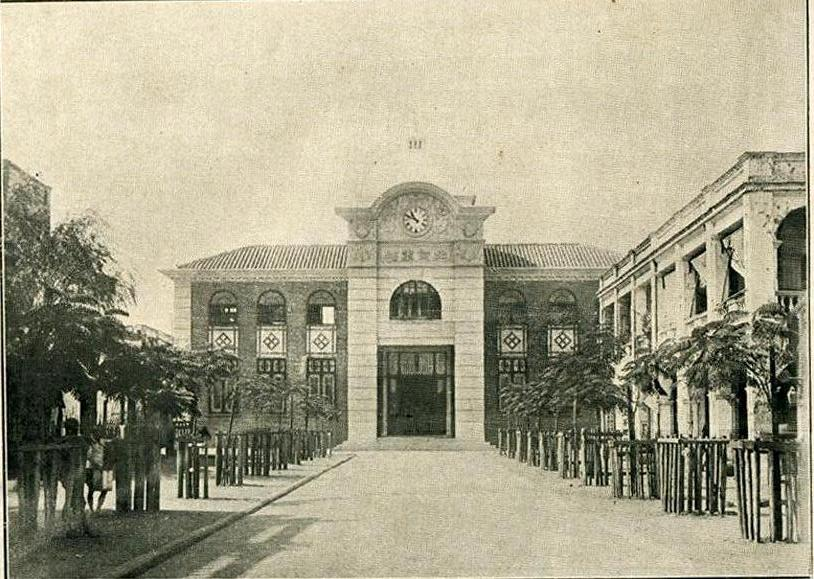
Beijie Railway Station, 1930

The company was officially chartered in 1906. The first section—15 miles from Kung Yick (公益, Gongyi) at the northern tip of the Taishan district to Taishan—opened in January 1908. In 1909, it reached Doushan and the 54-mile railway was officially open for business. By 1913, it reached another 26 miles to Jiangmen; a further 21-mile branch line from Taishan to Baisha opened in 1920. Altogether, construction costs totaled about 9.7 million yuan or US$4.8 million.

Rolling stock was purchased mainly from the United States, although three tank locomotives came from Germany. Trains typically had six or seven cars, carrying both passengers (in three classes) and freight. At its height in the 1920s, it carried three million passengers and approximately a hundred thousand tons of cargo annually, with 80% of income coming from passengers. In this same era, freight was heavily weighted toward imports: the import/export ratio was about thirty to one, in an economy heavily based on remittances from abroad.

By 1922 there was a machine shop in Kung Yick City. Chin Gee Hee claimed that it "could manufacture everything except the locomotive".

Unfulfilled 1924 plans by Chin would have extended the railway in one direction 40 miles from Doushan to the Tonggu Commercial Port and in the other to Foshan, through which would have reached Guangzhou and the domestic mainland. Chin also wanted to continue west through Yangjiang and the west of Guangdong and to the Leizhou peninsula, forming a traffic network throughout the southwest of Guangdong. Several similar proposals met similar fates: the well-connected Yuehan Railway Company had a near-monopoly on railway construction in Guangdong, some of the gentry wished to create their own railways, and while the Sun Ning finally obtained the required formal positions, by the time it got those permissions it was in financial trouble. Furthermore, the Qing government prevented them from borrowing from abroad, despite the fact that the government itself was taking foreign loans at the time. Consequently, the railway never connected to any major port or any other key city of the Chinese economy.

From 1927 to 1929, the government overtly took over the railroad, but it proved to be beyond their ability to operate it, and they returned it to civilian control. The railroad was destroyed in the Second Sino-Japanese War, dismantled in December 1938 to deny its use by the Japanese military, who nonetheless occupied Taishan. 23,782 rails were shipped to Guangxi in 1942 to build the Qianguei Railway; all other assets, which were worth over three million yuan, were carried off by the Japanese.

Lucie Cheng and Liu Yuzun write that, while the railway did not play major economic or strategic role in the history of Chinese transportation, "its entire life reflects the interlocking but conflicting pressures of Western imperialism, bureaucratic capitalism and feudalism which characterized early twentieth century China... Moreover [it] reflects the role of emigrant capital and nationalism on the development of enterprises in the emigrant motherland," reflecting especially the investment by overseas Chinese in a geographic area (Taishan) which had been the homeland for so many of them.

== See also ==
- Railway Protection Movement
- Chao Chow and Swatow Railway, another Chinese financed railway
