= Chin Gee Hee =

Chinese businessman (1844–1929)

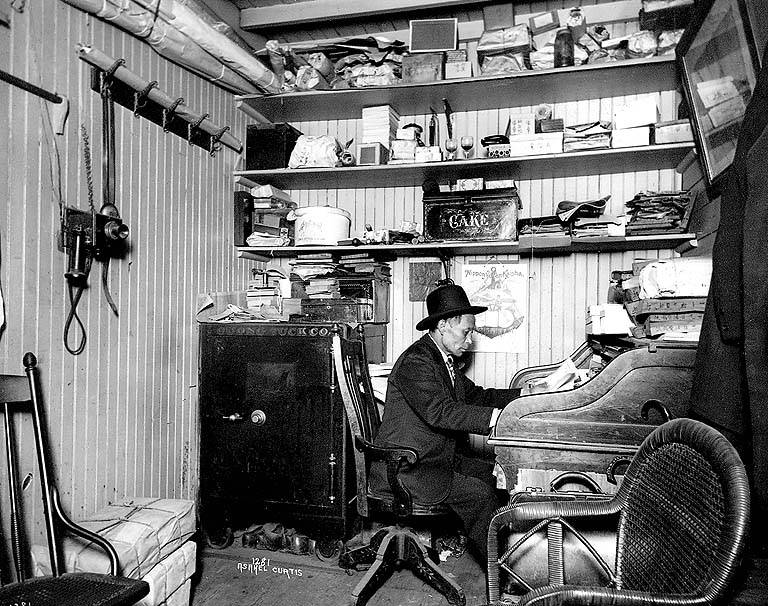
- Chin Gee Hee in his office in Seattle circa 1904
- Traditional Chinese: 陳宜禧
- Simplified Chinese: 陈宜禧
Transcriptions
Standard Mandarin
- Hanyu Pinyin: Chén Yíxǐ
Yue: Cantonese
- Jyutping: can4 ji4 hei1

Chin Gee Hee (June 22, 1844 – 1929), also rendered Cheun Gee Yee, courtesy name Cheung Ting (暢庭), was a Chinese merchant, labor contractor, and railway entrepreneur, who made his fortune in Seattle, Washington before returning to his native village in Guangdong province, where he continued his successes.

== Life ==
Born the son of a maker of soy sauce crocks in a village in what is now the city of Taishan, (Note: Sources variously refer to the village as "Look Tun", "Langmei village, Doushan town", or "Long-mei" (Chinese: 朗美; Jyutping: long5 mei5) "of Luk-choon" (Chinese: 六村; Jyutping: luk6 cyun1; possibly meaning "Sixth Village")],. There is more information in post #59 at the blog page.) Chin came to the attention of an old man (Note: Willard Jue gives the man's name as Hung-bok 宏伯 (pinyin: Hongbo)) because of his calm after some other boys smashed crocks that he was carrying to market. The man brought him along on his passage to America, where Chin worked in a placer mine before making his way to Port Gamble, Washington, where he worked in a lumber mill.

While still in North Kitsap, he learned a reasonable amount of English, and made friends with several Suquamish, including the family of Chief Seattle. He also met and befriended Henry Yesler, owner of a mill in the young city of Seattle, who convinced him to move there.

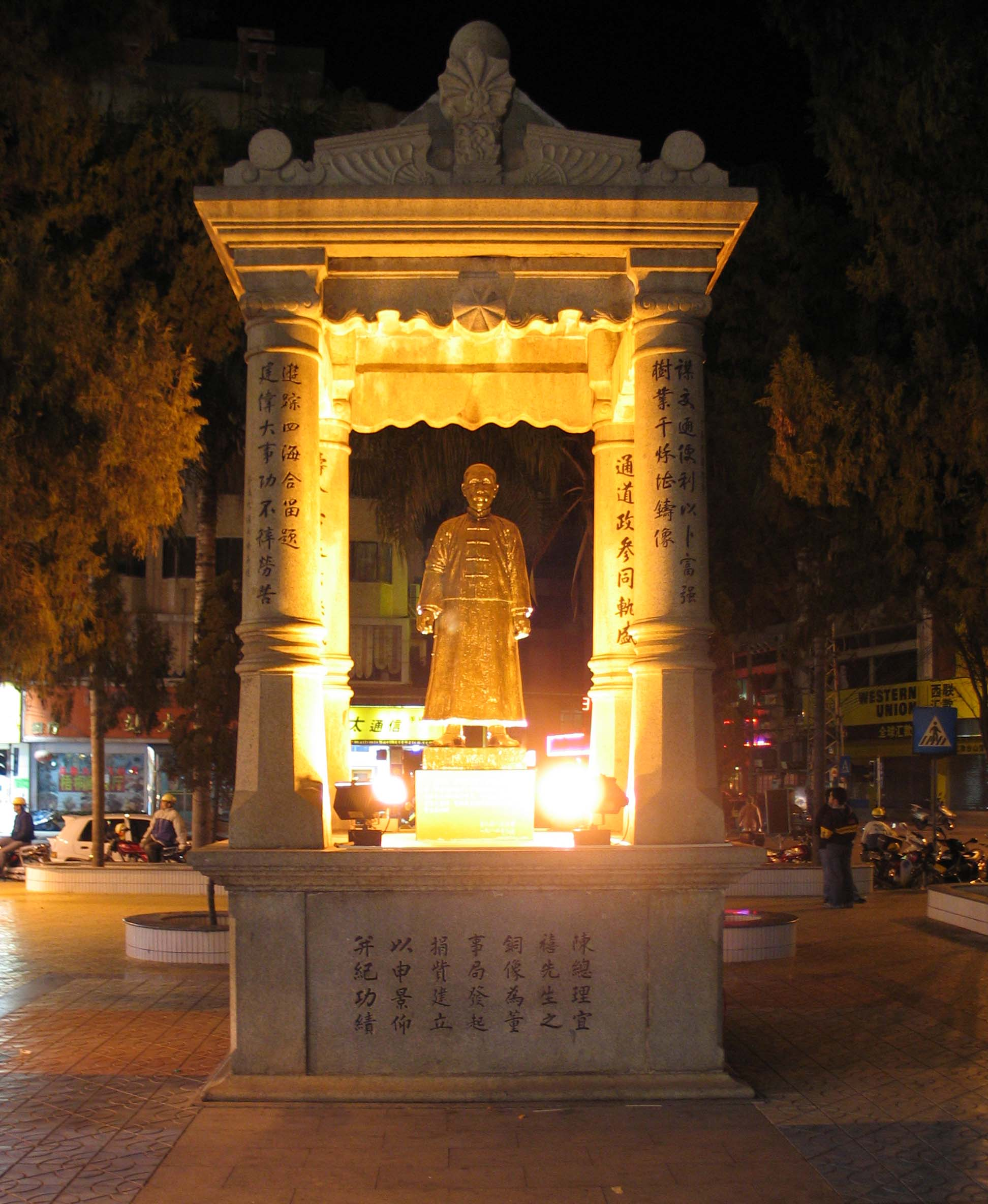
Monument to Chin Gee Hee in Taishan City, Guangdong

In 1873, he arrived in Seattle, a settlement that was about 20 years old at the time. After meeting Chin Chun Hock (Chinese: 陳程學; Jyutping: can4 cing4 hok6), who was from the same village in Taishan, he became a junior partner in the Wa Chong company (Chinese: 華昌; Jyutping: waa4 coeng1, "Chinese Prosperity"), the city's leading Chinese enterprise of the time. The Wa Chong company imported or manufactured goods including sugar, tea, rice, cigars, opium (legal at the time), and fireworks.

At the time, there were few Chinese women in America. While still in North Kitsap, Chin imported a wife from China. Their son Chin Lem (Chinese: 陳霖; Jyutping: can4 lam4), later known as Tew Dong (Chinese: 秋宗; Jyutping: cau1 zung1), born 1875 in Seattle, was the first known Chinese child born in Washington Territory (now Washington State).

At the Wa Chong company, he acquired labor contracts from coal mines, railroads, farming, and the Puget Sound mosquito fleet. As one of the major labor suppliers for Northern Pacific Railway in the Puget Sound district, Chin also helped with payroll and discipline of the Chinese labor. He also placed Chinese house-boys and cooks. His partnership with Chin Ching-hock was somewhat uneasy: Chin Ching-hock was more interested in imports and exports than in the labor contracting that became Chin Gee Hee's specialty.

Chin Gee Hee was a central figure in the efforts at political and diplomatic defense against the anti-Chinese riots of November 1885. During the crisis, he represented the community and exchanged telegrams with Chinese consul general Ow-yang Ming (Chinese: 歐陽明; pinyin: Ōuyáng Míng) in San Francisco, California. He kept careful records of damages to Chinese businesses, and, partly as a result, Seattle's Chinese community fared far better than that of neighboring Tacoma, ultimately remaining in the city and collecting $700,000 in damages through a favorable ruling by judge Thomas Burke.

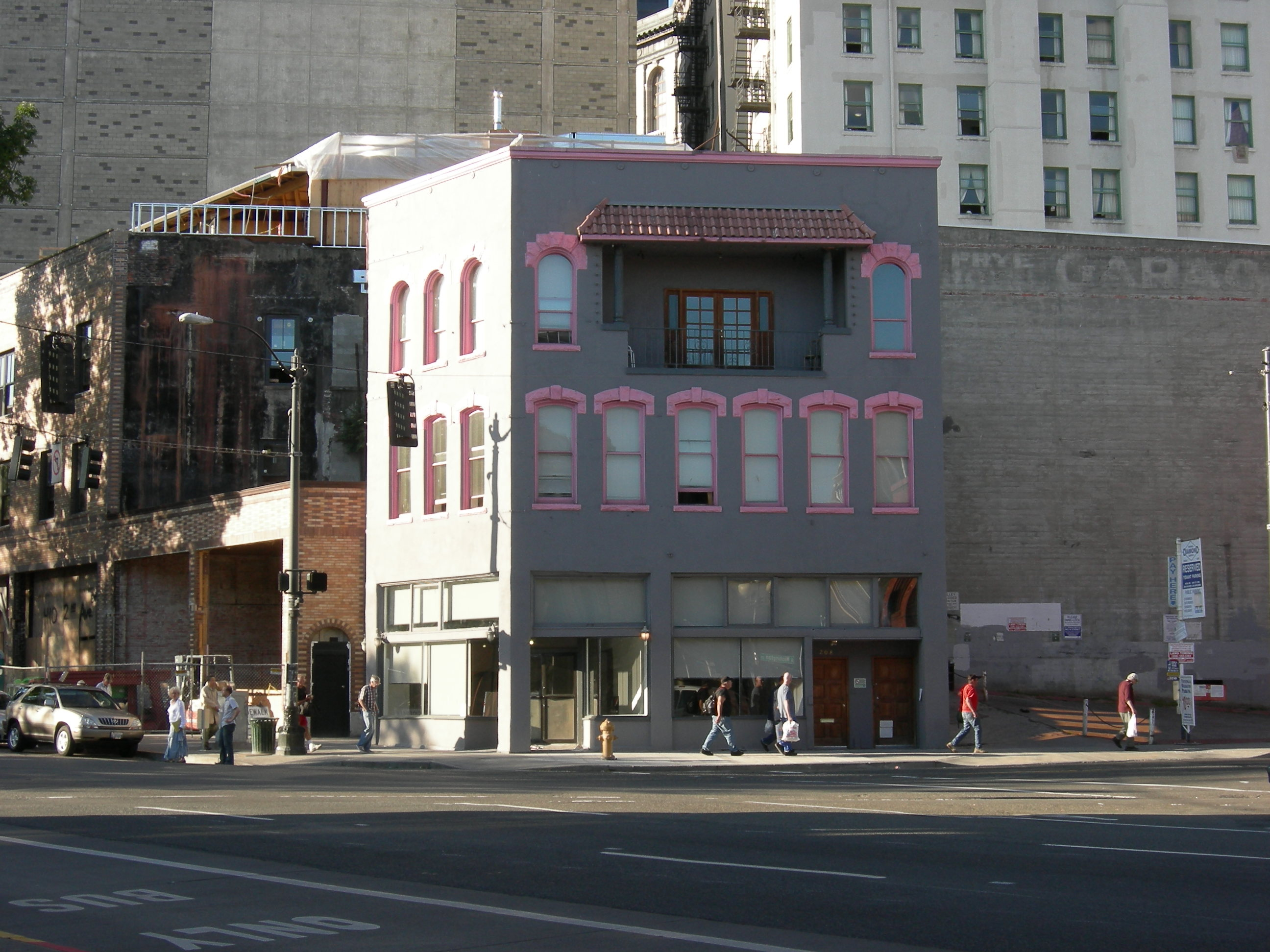
The Canton Building (photographed 2007)

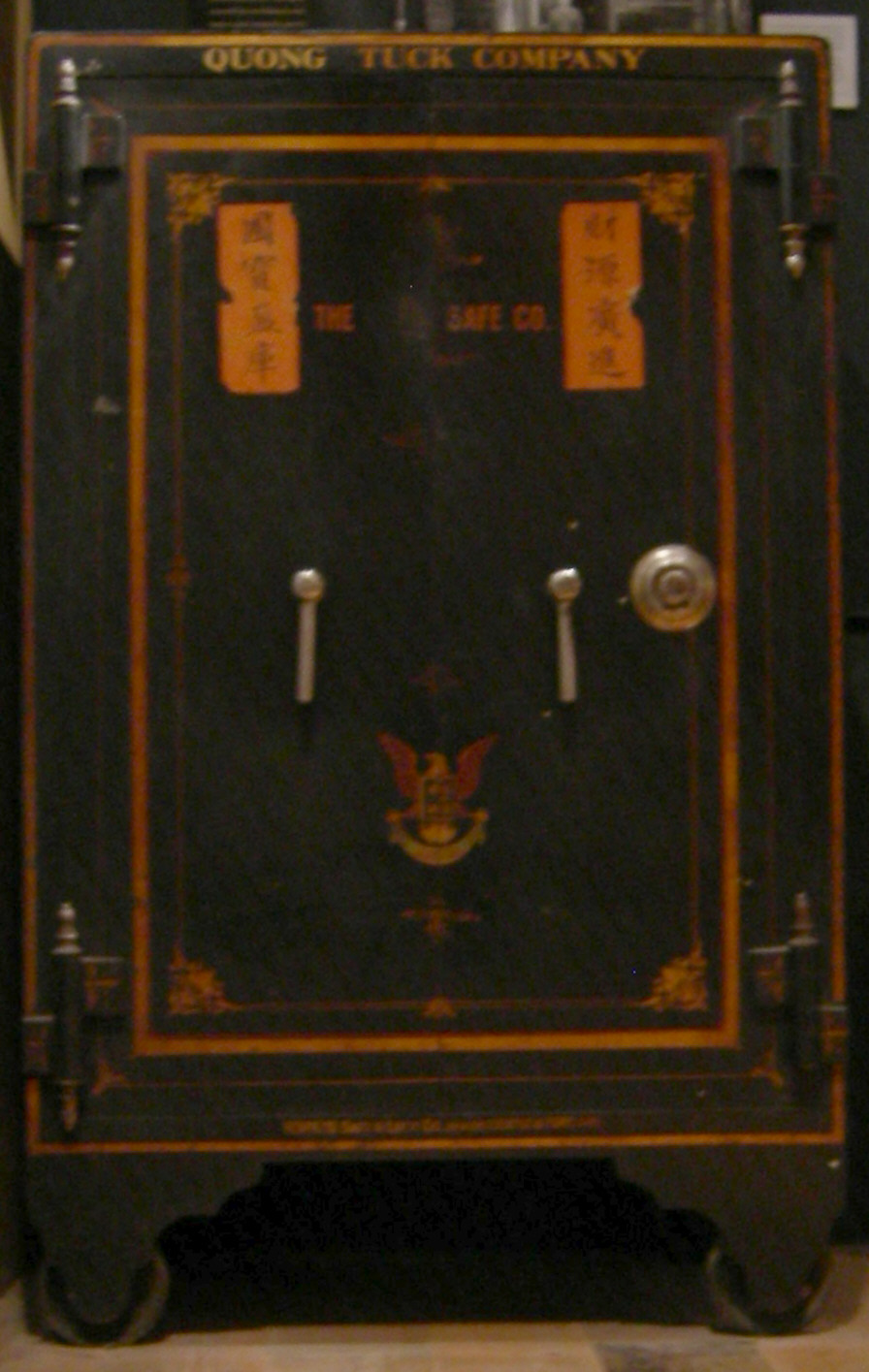
Quong Tuck Company safe. The Chinese writing on the safe says "May national treasure fill the coffer" (Chinese: 國寶盈庫) and "May numerous sources of wealth come in." (Chinese: 財源廣進)

In 1888, he set up independently as a labor contractor, with his Quong Tuck Company (also known as Quong Tuck Lung Company) or Quon Tuck Company supplying construction workers to railways (the Great Northern Railway, the Seattle and Walla Walla Railroad and Transportation Company) and to Seattle's regrading projects. He provided work crews (and was involved entrepreneurially) in rail lines along what are now Alaskan Way (along the Seattle waterfront) and a cable car perpendicular to the waterfront along Yesler Way as far as 14th Avenue. He also provided Chinese masons to help build the Burke Building, a full city block at Second Avenue and Marion Street. (Note: Torn down in 1971 to build what is now Seattle's Henry M. Jackson Federal Building; one arch of the Burke Building remains as a memorial).) His own building at Second and Washington, the Canton Building (also known as the Chin Gee Hee Building), 208-210 S. Washington Street, was among the first brick buildings raised after the Great Seattle Fire of June 6, 1889. It was shared with the Bow Tai Wo Company. (As of 2007, the building is still standing, though much altered; in particular, a 1928 re-routing of Second Avenue S. removed a corner of the building.)

He passed his Seattle business on to his son, Chin Lem, and son-in-law Woo Quon-bing (Chinese: 胡冠炳; Jyutping: wu4 gun3 bing2) and returned in 1904 or 1905 to China, where he was the entrepreneur behind South China's first railway and founded a seaport, while continuing also to have business associations with Seattle. He returned frequently to the U.S. and, in particular, to Seattle, where he retained close ties, and which he last visited in 1922.

His railway was known as the Sun Ning Railway Company. He raised $2.75 million, mainly from overseas Chinese; Chin's partner Yu Shek (Chinese: 余灼; Jyutping: jyu4 coek3) or Yu Chuek raised further funds in China and from overseas Chinese in Southeast Asia. The Sun Ning was the Pearl River Delta's first major railway. Its benefits to Guangdong's economy were cut short when it was seized by local warlords in 1926; it was finally destroyed during the Second Sino-Japanese War in 1938.

While in China, Chin also served as a connection for the Seattle China Club. Members of the China Club, which advocated for increased trade between China and Seattle, were invited to attend the opening of Chin's port in Guangdong.
