= Taishan, Guangdong =

Taishan 台山市
- County-level city
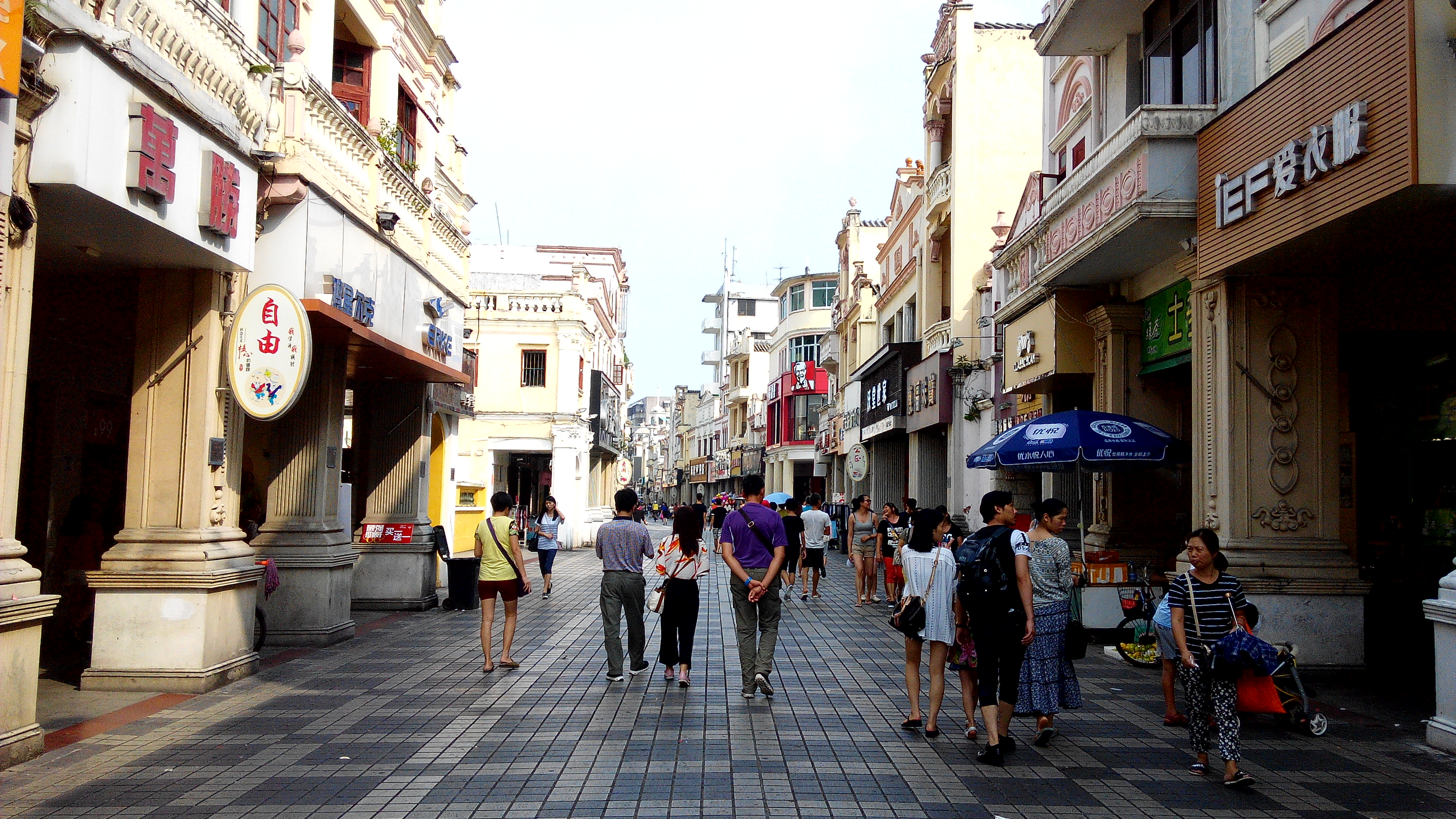
- Taicheng Subdistrict

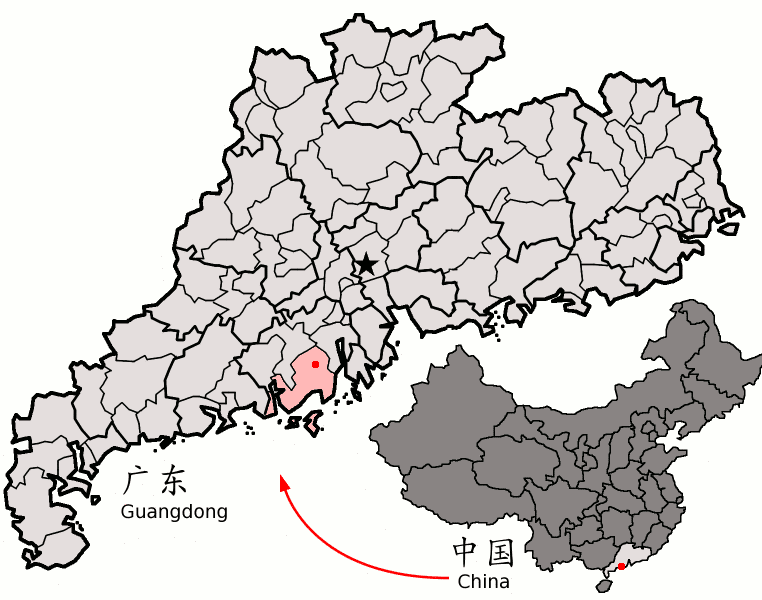
- Location of Taishan City (pink) within Jiangmen City (yellow) and Guangdong

- Location of the administrative center in Guangdong Province
- Coordinates: 22°15′07″N 112°47′38″E
- Country: China
- Province: Guangdong
- Prefecture-level city: Jiangmen

Area
  - County-level city: 3,286.3 km^{2} (1,268.8 sq mi)
  - Urban: 156.8 km^{2} (60.5 sq mi)

Population (2020 census)
  - County-level city: 907,044
  - Density: 276.01/km^{2} (714.86/sq mi)
  - Urban: 194,500
- Demonym: Taishanese
- Time zone: UTC+8 (China Standard)
- Postal code: 529200–529267
- Area code: 750

Taishan, Guangdong
- Simplified Chinese: 台山
- Traditional Chinese: 臺山
- Postal: Toisan
Transcriptions
Standard Mandarin
- Hanyu Pinyin: Táishān
- Wade–Giles: Tai2-shan1
- IPA: [tʰǎɪ.ʂán]
Yue: Cantonese
- Yale Romanization: Tòisāan
- Jyutping: Toi4 saan1
- IPA: [tʰɔ̭ːisáːn]
other Yue
- Taishanese: Hoi5 san1

Former names

Xinning
- Traditional Chinese: 新寧
- Simplified Chinese: 新宁
- Postal: Sunning
Transcriptions
Standard Mandarin
- Hanyu Pinyin: Xīnníng
Yue: Cantonese
- Yale Romanization: Sānnìng
- Jyutping: San1 ning4
other Yue
- Taishanese: Lhen1 nen5

Taishan (Chinese: 台山; pinyin: Táishān), or Toi San (Jyutping: Toi4saan1), is a county-level city in the southwest of Guangdong province, China. It is administered as part of the prefecture-level city of Jiangmen. During the 2020 census, there were 907,354 inhabitants (941,095 in 2010), but only 433,266 were considered urban. As one of the most renowned qiaoxiangs, Taishan calls itself the "First Home of the Overseas Chinese". An estimated half a million Chinese Americans are of Taishanese descent.

It was named Xinning (新寧) until 1914, which was romanised as "Sunning".

== Geography ==
Taishan is in the Pearl River Delta, in southwestern Jiangmen Prefecture. It has 95 islands and islets, including Shangchuan Island, Guangdong's largest island now that Hainan is a separate province. Taishan is one of Guangdong's "Four Counties" (Sze Yup), which excluded Heshan and is now part of the Greater Taishan Region.

=== Climate ===
Climate data for Taishan, elevation 33 m (108 ft), (1991–2020 normals, extremes 1957–present)
| Month | Jan | Feb | Mar | Apr | May | Jun | Jul | Aug | Sep | Oct | Nov | Dec | Year |
|---|---|---|---|---|---|---|---|---|---|---|---|---|---|
| Record high °C (°F) | 28.2 (82.8) | 29.4 (84.9) | 32.0 (89.6) | 33.4 (92.1) | 35.2 (95.4) | 37.2 (99.0) | 38.3 (100.9) | 37.3 (99.1) | 36.2 (97.2) | 35.5 (95.9) | 32.5 (90.5) | 29.3 (84.7) | 38.3 (100.9) |
| Mean daily maximum °C (°F) | 18.8 (65.8) | 20.2 (68.4) | 22.8 (73.0) | 26.7 (80.1) | 30.0 (86.0) | 31.7 (89.1) | 32.5 (90.5) | 32.4 (90.3) | 31.3 (88.3) | 28.7 (83.7) | 24.9 (76.8) | 20.4 (68.7) | 26.7 (80.1) |
| Daily mean °C (°F) | 14.5 (58.1) | 16.0 (60.8) | 18.9 (66.0) | 22.9 (73.2) | 26.3 (79.3) | 28.0 (82.4) | 28.6 (83.5) | 28.3 (82.9) | 27.3 (81.1) | 24.7 (76.5) | 20.6 (69.1) | 16.1 (61.0) | 22.7 (72.8) |
| Mean daily minimum °C (°F) | 11.6 (52.9) | 13.3 (55.9) | 16.3 (61.3) | 20.5 (68.9) | 23.7 (74.7) | 25.5 (77.9) | 25.9 (78.6) | 25.6 (78.1) | 24.6 (76.3) | 21.7 (71.1) | 17.6 (63.7) | 13.1 (55.6) | 20.0 (67.9) |
| Record low °C (°F) | 2.7 (36.9) | −0.1 (31.8) | 3.2 (37.8) | 8.6 (47.5) | 14.1 (57.4) | 18.2 (64.8) | 21.6 (70.9) | 21.9 (71.4) | 16.5 (61.7) | 11.1 (52.0) | 5.0 (41.0) | 2.0 (35.6) | −0.1 (31.8) |
| Average precipitation mm (inches) | 41.3 (1.63) | 41.5 (1.63) | 68.3 (2.69) | 170.5 (6.71) | 292.2 (11.50) | 381.6 (15.02) | 299.3 (11.78) | 331.9 (13.07) | 228.4 (8.99) | 68.2 (2.69) | 34.3 (1.35) | 32.9 (1.30) | 1,990.4 (78.36) |
| Average precipitation days (≥ 0.1 mm) | 6.2 | 8.5 | 11.4 | 13.1 | 16.0 | 18.9 | 17.3 | 17.4 | 13.7 | 6.0 | 5.0 | 5.0 | 138.5 |
| Average relative humidity (%) | 73 | 78 | 82 | 83 | 83 | 84 | 82 | 83 | 80 | 73 | 71 | 67 | 78 |
| Mean monthly sunshine hours | 125.8 | 97.1 | 85.7 | 108.2 | 159.7 | 177.4 | 220.3 | 192.9 | 178.7 | 196.2 | 169.1 | 155.7 | 1,866.8 |
| Percentage possible sunshine | 37 | 30 | 23 | 28 | 39 | 44 | 54 | 49 | 49 | 55 | 51 | 47 | 42 |
Source: China Meteorological Administrationall-time record lowall-time October record

== History ==
During the Ming dynasty, the area of present-day Taishan was carved out of Xinhui County on 12 February 1499 as "Xinning County". By the 19th century, Xinning was already a source of migrant and emigrant workers, but a series of subsequent natural and political disasters in the area exacerbated the situation. Aside from the disruption of the Sea Ban regulations (Haijin) themselves, their revocation led to an influx of northern settlers who began long-running feuds with the returning locals; this erupted into full-scale war in the 1850s and '60s. The 1842 Treaty of Nanking that ended the First Opium War opened China to greater foreign trade just before the California Gold Rush made the prospect of emigration to the United States appealing. Many also served as contract workers abroad, as in Hawaii, Peru and Cuba and—most famously—for the Central Pacific half of America's Transcontinental Railroad, where the Chinese made up 80% of the company's workforce as they laid track over the mountains and deserts of the west. By 1870, there were 63,000 Chinese in the U.S., almost all in California.

Chin Gee Hee's Sun Ning Railway Company connected Sun Ning (Xinning) with its hinterland in 1908 and reached Jiangmen (Kongmoon) in 1913. It was notable as one of only three railways financed, built, owned, and run by the Chinese themselves before the 1949 Communist victory in the Chinese Civil War.

In 1914, the new Republican government renamed the area Taishan County to avoid confusion with other places named Xinning. (Foreign sources now frequently confuse it with Mount Tai in Shandong.) During the Second World War, the Sun Ning Railway was destroyed to prevent its use by the Japanese. Japanese soldiers entered Taicheng, the county seat, in March 1941 and killed nearly 280 people. One quarter of the "Flying Tigers", a joint American and Chinese group of airmen who fought the Japanese before the U.S. entered the Second World War, hailed from Taishan.

Taishan was promoted to county-level city status on 17 April 1992, reflecting its increasing level of urbanization.

== Administration ==
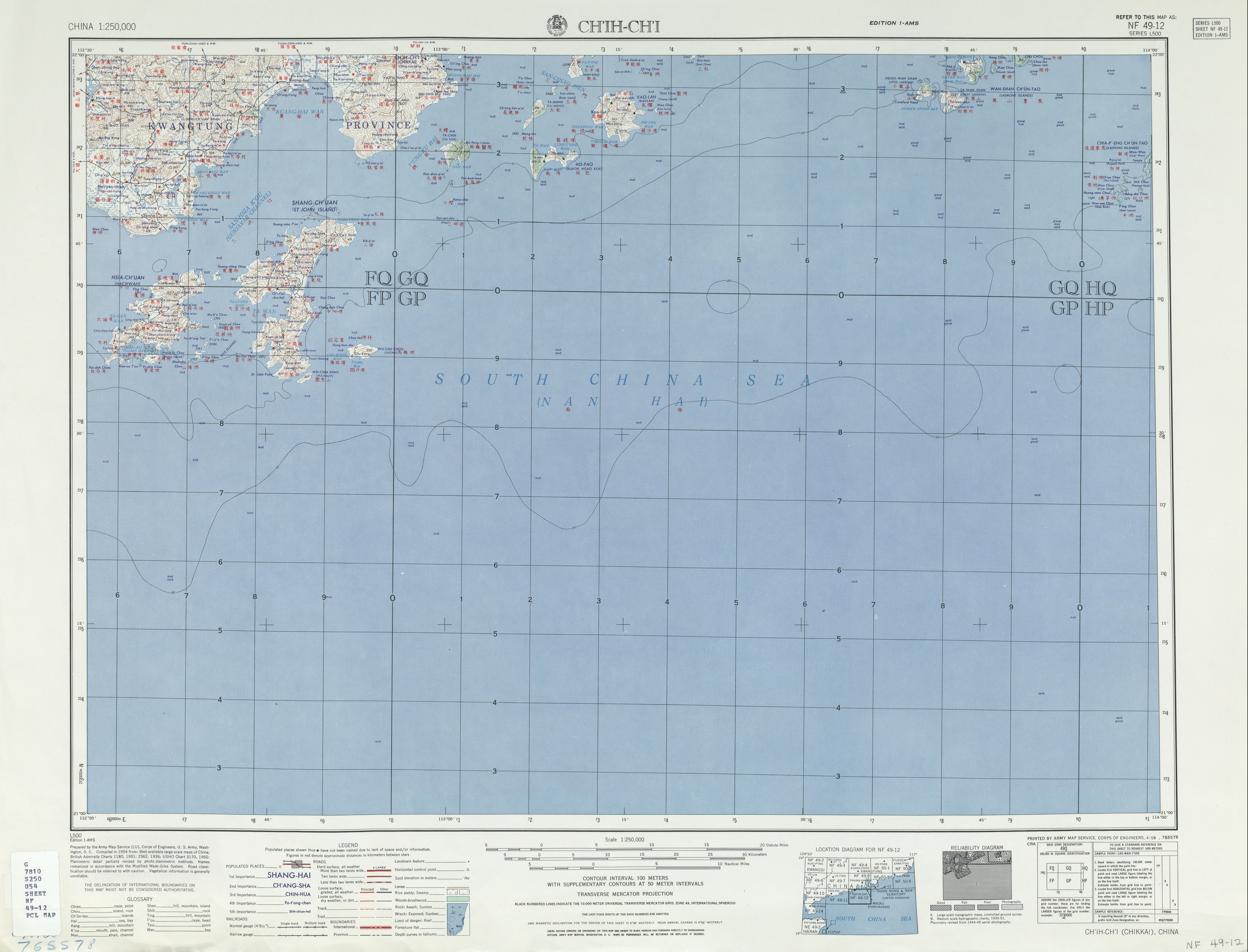
Chixi (labeled CH'IH-CH'I (CHIKKAI) 赤溪) (1954)

Taishan administers one subdistrict and 16 towns, which in turn are subdivided into 313 administrative villages (村委會), and residential communities (社區委會). The city has 3,655 natural villages, but they do not function as administrative divisions (自然村).

Taishan's township-level divisions are:

| Name | Chinese (S) | Hanyu Pinyin | Population (2010) |
|---|---|---|---|
| Taicheng Subdistrict | 臺城街道 | Táichéng Jiēdào | 246,844 |
| Dajiang town | 大江鎮 | Dàjiāng Zhèn | 46,674 |
| Shuibu town | 水步鎮 | Shuǐbù Zhèn | 42,578 |
| Sijiu town | 四九鎮 | Sìjiǔ Zhèn | 37,402 |
| Baisha town | 白沙鎮 | Báishā Zhèn | 52,462 |
| Sanhe town | 三合鎮 | Sānhé Zhèn | 36,215 |
| Chonglou town | 衝蔞鎮 | Chōnglóu Zhèn | 32,483 |
| Doushan town | 鬥山鎮 | Dòushān Zhèn | 48,229 |
| Duhu town | 都斛鎮 | Dōuhú Zhèn | 42,657 |
| Chixi town (Chihkai; Chihchi) | 赤溪鎮 | Chìxī Zhèn | 34,450 |
| Duanfen town | 端芬鎮 | Duānfēn Zhèn | 45,729 |
| Guanghai town | 廣海鎮 | Guǎnghǎi Zhèn | 43,465 |
| Haiyan town | 海宴鎮 | Hǎiyàn Zhèn | 73,212 |
| Wencun town | 汶村鎮 | Wèncūn Zhèn | 49,565 |
| Shenjing town | 深井鎮 | Shēnjǐng Zhèn | 52,767 |
| Beidou town | 北陡鎮 | Běidǒu Zhèn | 28,091 |
| Chuandao town | 川島鎮 | Chuāndǎo Zhèn | 28,272 |

Some of the city's natural villages include Annanjiangchao (安南江潮), Bihou (庇厚), Jilong, and Guanbuli (官步里).

== Demographics ==
Historical population
| Year | Pop. | ±% |
|---|---|---|
| 1502 | 23,281 | — |
| 1657 | 13,635 | −41.4% |
| 1838 | 196,162 | +1338.7% |
| 1931 | 984,491 | +401.9% |
| 1948 | 765,342 | −22.3% |
| 2000 | 948,716 | +24.0% |
| 2010 | 941,095 | −0.8% |
| 2020 | 907,744 | −3.5% |
Population size may be affected by changes to administrative divisions.

Counting the total Greater Taishan Region or Sze Yap Region, which includes Kaiping, Xinhui, Enping and Taishan, there are about 8 to 9 million Taishanese people worldwide. According to American historian Him Mark Lai, approximately 430,000 or 70% of Chinese Americans in the 1980s were Taishanese according to 1988 data. About 500,000 Chinese Americans claim Taishanese origins today.

While Taishan itself has a population of about 1 million, there are around 1.3 million Taishanese people overseas, distributed in 91 countries and regions. It is estimated that, up to the mid- to late-20th century, over 75% of all overseas Chinese in North America claimed origin in Taishan, so Taishan has been called the "Home of Overseas Chinese".

=== Language ===
Taishan's main dialect is Taishanese (台山话; 臺山話).Most Taishanese today use Mandarin in school or formal occasions, but Taishanese is the lingua franca.Schools require their students to speak Mandarin in the classroom, and teachers are required to lecture in Mandarin.

Taishanese is a language of the Yue Chinese, a large group that includes, but is broader than, the Cantonese spoken in Hong Kong and Guangzhou. Cantonese and Taishanese are thus related but distinct. Cantonese is also widely known in Taishan, as it serves as Guangdong Province's lingua franca.

Before the 1980s, Taishanese was the predominant Chinese language spoken throughout North America's Chinatowns.

== Economy ==
In 2018, Taishan's GDP reached 43.25 billion Yuan, government revenue was 2.92 billion Yuan, fixed-asset investment was 27.33 billion Yuan, retail sales totaled 25.52 billion Yuan, and foreign trade totaled 13.76 billion Yuan.

=== Power generation ===
Taishan is home to two major power plants: the Guohua Taishan Power Station and the Taishan Nuclear Power Plant.

== Culture ==
=== Sports ===
Taishan is nicknamed the "hometown of volleyball", after the game was introduced to the city in 1915 by Lingnan University student Wu Xiumin (伍秀民). Many prominent Chinese volleyball players have hailed from Taishan. In recent years, local governments in the city have invested in the area's volleyball programs, and the city hosted a number of Volleyball Women's Nations League matches in 2018. 9-man is a form of volleyball from Taishan brought to American Chinatowns by Taishanese immigrants.

=== Music and Entertainment ===
Parts of the movie Let the Bullets Fly were filmed in Taishan in 2010.

=== Globalization ===
Due to mass emigration abroad, Taishan developed an "import culture," where those that returned brought aspects of overseas culture with them. As a result, Western-style household goods such as flush toilets, cast-iron bathtubs, and architectural styles, dressing in suits, and incorporating English words into Taishanese all became a part of daily life.

== Education ==
Education enjoys significant support from Overseas Chinese professionals and businessmen. Many secondary schools were built and financed by Chinese living in China's Special Administrative Regions, as well as various foreign countries, such as the United States, Canada, and Brazil. To honor their benefactors, these schools often bear either their names or the names of said donor's parents.

The Peng Quan School (鹏权中学; 鵬權中學) is a prime example, which was constructed during 1999–2001 and is now integrated into Taishan's public school system. It is situated on the west side of Taicheng and was built by a Hong Kong businessman.

There are many middle schools and high schools in Taishan but no academic universities. Students must study rigorously in order to be accepted at universities located in other cities.

Taishan schools include:

University:

- Taishan Panshi Television University (台山磐石电视大学; 臺山磐石電視大學)

Secondary schools (including combined junior-senior high schools and senior high schools):

- Taishan No. 1 High School (台山第一中学; 臺山第壹中學)
- Taishan Overseas Chinese Middle School (台山市华侨中学; 臺山市華僑中學)
- Taishan Peiying Vocational Technical School (台山市培英职业技术学校; 臺山市培英職業技術學校)
- Taishan Taishi Senior High School (台山市台师高级中学; 臺山市臺師高級中學)
- Taishan City Peng Quan School (台山市鹏权中学; 臺山市鵬權中學)
- Taishan Litan Gengkai Memorial Middle School (台山市李谭更开纪念中学; 臺山市李譚更開紀念中學)
- Taishan Peizheng School (台山培正中学; 臺山培正中學)
- Taishan Renyuan Middle School (台山市任远中学; 臺山市任遠中學)
- Taishan Guang Hai School (台山广海中学; 臺山廣海中學)
- Taishan Shuibu Middle School (台山市水步中学; 臺山市水步中學)
- Taishan Lishufen Memorial Middle School (台山市李树芬纪念中学; 臺山市李樹芬紀念中學)
- Taishan Chonglou Middle School (台山冲蒌中学; 臺山沖蔞中學)
- Taishan Xueye Junior Middle School (台山市学业初级中学; 臺山市學業初級中學)
- Taishan Xinning Middle School (台山市新宁中学; 臺山市新寧中學)
- Taishan Yizhong Dajiang Experimental Middle School (台山一中大江实验中学; 臺山壹中大江實驗中學)
- Taishan Najin Middle School (台山市那金中学; 臺山市那金中學)
- Taishan Ningyang Middle School (台山宁阳中学; 臺山寧陽中學)

== Transportation ==
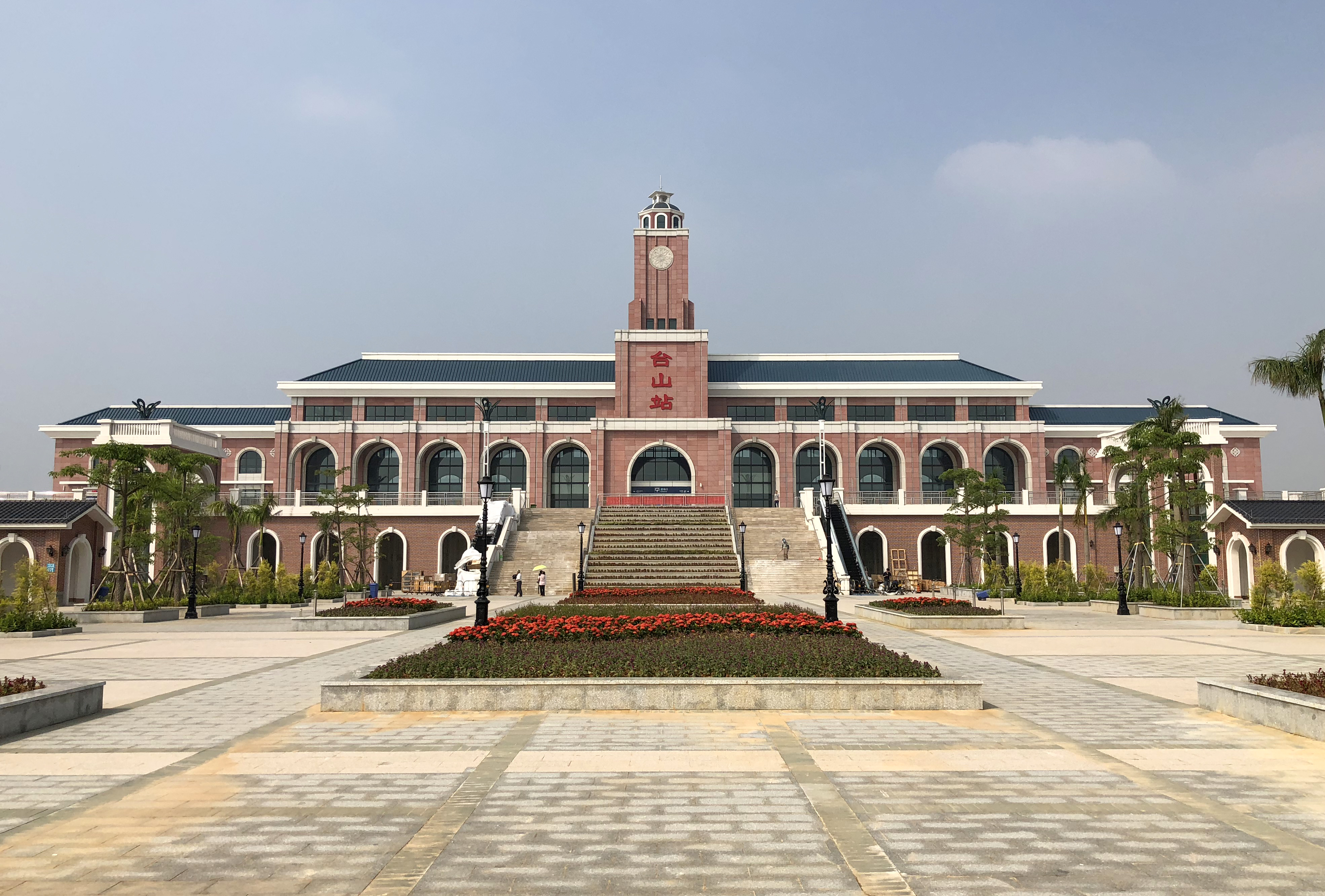
Taishan railway station, which is built to resemble the former Ningcheng Station of the Sunning Railway

Taishan is accessible by bus with a long-distance bus station in Taicheng, and through a port at GongYi on the Tan River which flows into the Pearl River Delta. The ferry service between GongYi and Hong Kong has been discontinued.

=== Ferry ===
Ferry services connect the island of Shangchuan with the mainland, sailing between the Sanzhou Harbor (三洲港) on Shangchuan, and Shanzui Harbor (山咀港) in the town of Chuandao. There are also daily ferry services between Sanzhou Harbor and the nearby island of Xiachuan.

=== Rail ===
In 2018, Taishan railway station opened in Taicheng Subdistrict, connecting the city via rail. The station, located 7 kilometers (4.3 mi) north of the city center, is a stop on the Shenzhen–Zhanjiang high-speed railway, and has a couple dozen trains a day running to Guangzhou South railway station.
