= Baisha, Taishan =

Baisha 白沙镇
- Town
- Location in Guangdong
- Coordinates: 22°14′45″N 112°35′41″E
- Country: People's Republic of China
- Province: Guangdong
- Prefecture-level city: Jiangmen
- County-level city: Taishan

Area
  - Total: 238 km^{2} (92 sq mi)

Population
  - Total: 140,000
  - Density: 590/km^{2} (1,500/sq mi)
- Time zone: UTC+8 (China Standard)

Baisha (Chinese: 白沙; pinyin: Báishā; Jyutping: baak^{6}saa^{1}; lit. 'white sand'; Taishanese: Bak-sa) is a town of Taishan, Guangdong province. As of 2018, it has two residential communities and 18 villages under its administration. As of 2024, Baisha has a population of 90,410 residing in an area of 238 km^{2} (92 sq mi).

== History ==
Baisha town was the ancestral home of many of the first Chinese Canadians. Their descendants live all over Canada, and used to predominate before the 1980s in the Chinatowns of Victoria, Vancouver, Calgary, Banff and Edmonton, and US West Coast cities such as San Francisco and Seattle.

== Economy ==
Baisha Town is one of the few regions in northern Guangdong province where illegal rare earth mines were operating. Baisha Town is rich in rare earth minerals such as dysprosium.

== Dialect ==
The Baisha variant of Taishanese is fading amongst the descendants of Canadian-Chinese, as Cantonese and Mandarin become more dominant. Based on observations of Chinese-Canadian elders living in Edmonton between 1980 and 2005, it would seem that the Taishan language spoken in Baisha in the mid-20th century differed somewhat from that spoken in Taicheng (Hoiseng in the Hoisan language, 台城), the county seat of Taishan (Hoisan, 台山县). Indeed, the pronunciation was more or less the same as that of people living across the river in the next county, Kaiping (Hoiping in the Toisanese language, 开平). One notable difference can be seen in the shift of certain vowel sounds, as follows:

English	Taishanese		Cantonese			Mandarin		
English	Baisha	Taishan	Cantonese IPA	Jyutping	Traditional Chinese characters	Mandarin IPA	Pinyin	Simplified Chinese characters
blood	het	hut	hyːt˧	hyut^{3}	血	ɕjɛ˨˩˦	xuě	血
moon	nget	ngut	jyːt˨	jyut^{6}	月	ɥɛ˥˩	yùe	月
snow	hlet	hlut	syːt˧	syut^{3}	雪	ɕɥɛ˨˩˦	xǔe	雪

Besides the differences in some vowel sounds, the consonant [b] of Mandarin is usually realized as [v], and [p] as [h].

English	Taishanese		Cantonese			Mandarin		
English	Baisha	Taishan	Cantonese IPA	Jyutping	Traditional Chinese characters	Mandarin IPA	Pinyin	Simplified Chinese characters
(stomach) full	vow	bow	paːu̯˧˥	baau^{2}	飽	pɑʊ˨˩˦	bǎo	饱
eight	vatt	batt	paːt˧	baat^{3}	八	pa˥	bā	八
quilt	hi	pi	pʰei̯˩˧	pei^{5}	被	peɪ˥˩tsɨ	bèizi	被子
wife	law hu	law pu	lou̯˩˧ pʰɔː˨˩ or lou̯˩˧ pʰɔː˩	lou^{5} po^{4}	老婆	lɑʊ˨˩pʰo˧˥	lǎopó	老婆
