= Bolelli =

Bolelli is an Italian surname. Notable people with the surname include:

- Simone Bolelli (born 1985), Italian tennis player
- Franco Bolelli (1950–2020), Italian philosopher
- Daniele Bolelli (born 1974), Italian writer and martial artist, son of Franco Bolelli
