= Taishanese people =

Ethnic subdivision of Han Chinese

Taishanese People
台山人 Hoi San Ngin
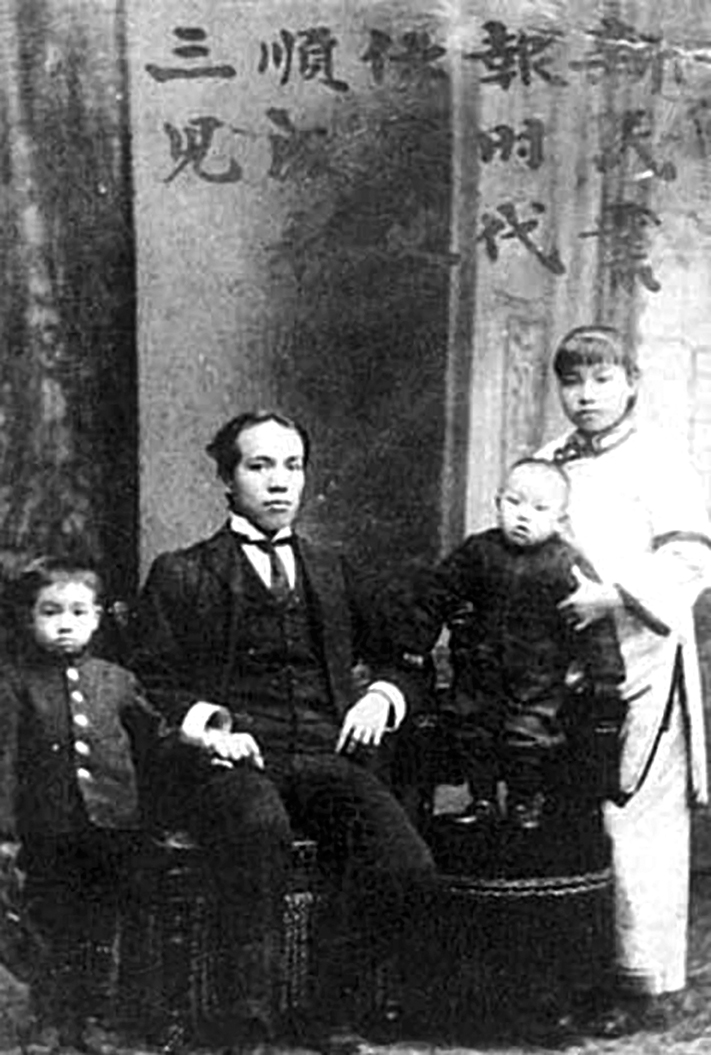
- Photo of Liang Qichao and his family in 1905, Liang is one of the most famous people of Taishan ancestry

Total population
- c. 8–9 million

Regions with significant populations
- China (Guangdong, Macau, Hong Kong) North America (Canada and United States)

Languages
- Taishanese and Cantonese (parent tongues), English, Standard Chinese

Religion
- Predominantly Chinese folk religions (including Confucianism, Taoism, ancestral worship etc) and Mahayana Buddhism; Minority: Christianity

Related ethnic groups
- Cantonese people, other Han Chinese

The Taishanese people (Chinese: 台山人, Taishanese: Hoi San Ngin), Sze Yup people (Chinese: 四邑人, Taishanese: Hlei Yip Ngin), or Toisanese, are a Yue-speaking Han Chinese ethnographic subgroup coming from the region of Sze Yup (四邑), which consisted of the four county-level cities of Taishan, Kaiping, Xinhui and Enping. Heshan has since been added to this historic region and the prefecture-level city of Jiangmen administers all five of these county-level cities, which are sometimes informally called Ng Yap. The ancestors of Taishanese people are said to have arrived from central China under a thousand years ago and migrated into Guangdong during the Tang Dynasty. Taishanese, as a dialect of Yue Chinese, has linguistically preserved many characteristics of Middle Chinese.

The Taishanese are part of the Yue Chinese family and have an identity that distinguishes themselves from the dominant Cantonese people. Among the Han Chinese, Taishanese are a source for many famous international Chinese celebrities and have produced the largest numbers of Chinese actors and singers of any region in mainland China. Despite their small population, Taishanese people have also produced a number of famous academics and historical figures. Sze Yup or Jiangmen is considered the home of Chinese Academicians, a title gifted by the world's largest research institution, the Chinese Academy of Sciences. The total of academicians is 31 people, a city with over 20 is considered extremely rare in China.

Among Asian Americans, Taishanese are influential in politics and were the first Americans of Asian descent to be elected as governors (for example Gary Locke), mayors and congressmen. The Taishanese were the first Chinese people to settle in America and the Taishanese language was the original lingua franca of Chinatowns. Taishanese as the lingua franca was later replaced with Cantonese after being overwhelmed by immigration from Guangzhou and its satellite cities when the Chinese Exclusion Act was fully repealed under the Immigration and Nationality Act of 1965. Taishanese American laundrymen and shopkeepers were a primary source of funding that helped launch Dr. Sun Yat-sen's revolutionary activities while he was in exile and raising money from overseas countrymen.

== Language and identity ==
Taishanese is a Yue Chinese language that is distinguished from Standard Cantonese but non-specialists often use "Cantonese" in a broader sense for the entire Yue subgroup of Chinese rather than specifically the language of Guangzhou. Cantonese speakers often find Taishanese difficult to understand and have an average intelligibility of only 30%. This is also true for other Yue Chinese variants such as the Goulou dialects.

Unlike most varieties of Chinese, Cantonese has de facto official status in Hong Kong and Macau and has an independent tradition of the written vernacular. Taishanese, who make up one-third of the population of Hong Kong, may identify themselves with Cantonese instead of Taishanese. Since Hong Kong culture is heavily Cantonese-influenced and is a Cantonese-speaking society, Taishanese and other Han Chinese who are Hong Kong-born and raised, assimilate into the Cantonese identity of Hong Kong. Many Hong Kong activists are of Taishanese ancestry such as the late Szeto Wah who was a politician of the pan-democracy camp and sang democratic Cantonese songs with other activists to promote democracy in China.

== Culture ==
Kaiping Diaolou and Villages
UNESCO World Heritage Site
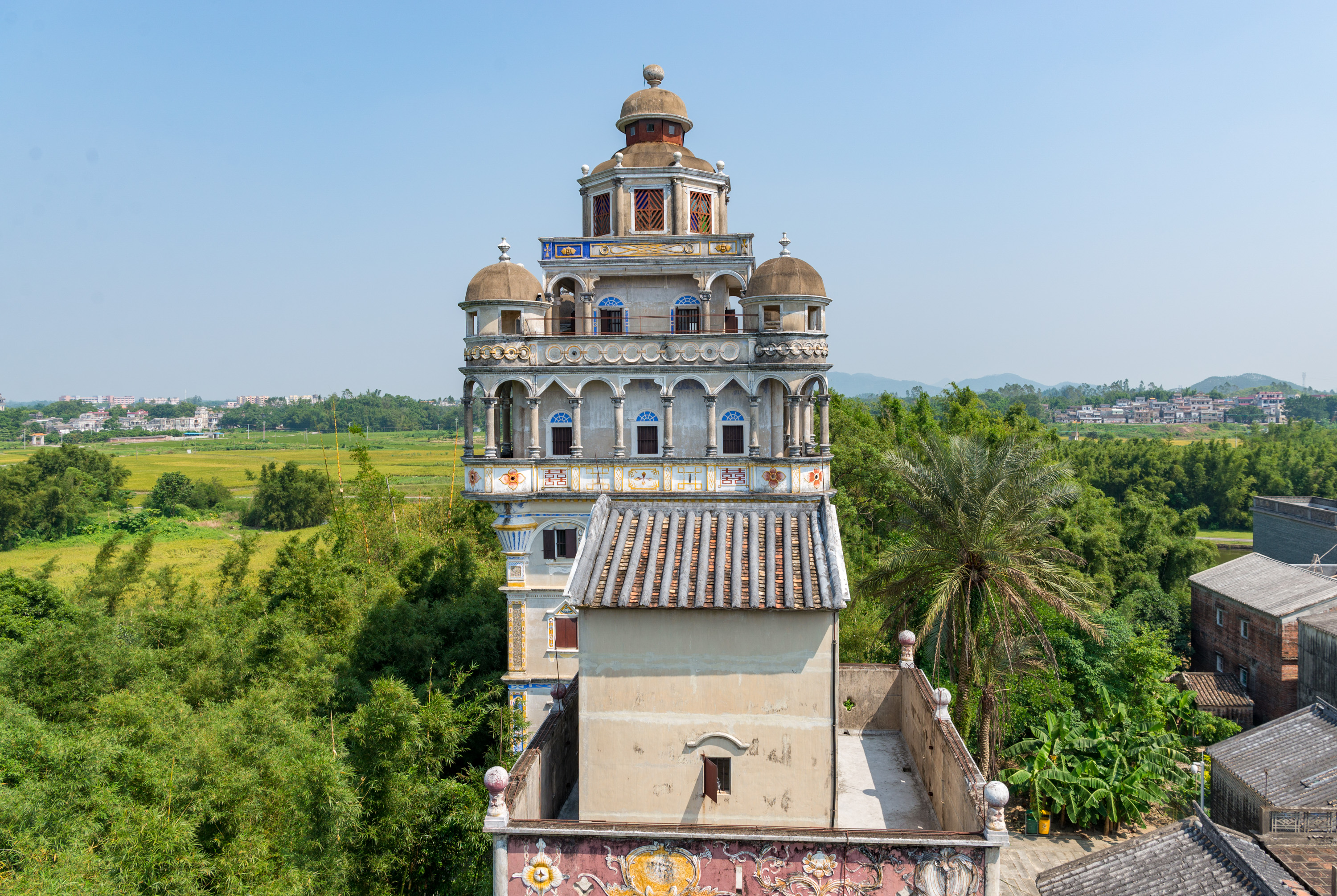
- Ruishi Diaolou (瑞石樓) in Jinjiangli village

- Location within Guangdong Location within China
- Location: Kaiping, Guangdong, China
- Includes: 1. Yinglong Lou (at Sanmenli Village); 2. Zili Village and the Fang Clan Watch Tower; 3. Majianlong Village Cluster; 4. Jingjiangli Village
- Criteria: Cultural: (ii), (iii), (iv)
- Reference: 1112
- Inscription: 2007 (31st Session)
- Area: 372 ha (920 acres)
- Buffer zone: 2,738 ha (6,770 acres)
- Coordinates: 22°17′8″N 112°33′57″E

Culturally, Taishanese people are similar to other Yue Chinese peoples. Today, many Sze Yup people have become successful in many areas such as the entertainment industry, business and politics. Hong Kongers of Sze Yup ancestry include: Andy Lau, Beyond (band), Danny Chan, Kenny Kwan, Joey Yung, Ronnie Chan, John Tsang, Andrew Li and many others. The Father of Hong Kong Cinema, Lai Man-Wai also has ancestry from the Sze Yup region of province. As a result, Sze Yup people have dominated in the entertainment industry and play most major roles in the music and movie sectors. In many films, Taishanese can be heard, especially in many of Karl Maka's films such as Merry Christmas and Aces Go Places.

It is said that over a hundred famous people come from the Sze Yup region of Guangdong Province, making the region famous for producing more stars than any other city/region in mainland China. As a result, the local government in Jiangmen which administers the Sze Yup or Ng Yap cities of Taishan, Kaiping, Enping, Xinhui, and Heshan, decided to build a Stars Park called Jiangmen star park (江门星光园).

Taishan county is famous for being the Birthplace of China's volleyball, that was brought to Taishan by Overseas Chinese and the city won many provincial and national championships. Taishanese are well known for their love for Volleyball and being China's champions. Premier Zhou En-Lai once stated, "Taishan is Half of the Country's (China) System."

=== Architecture ===
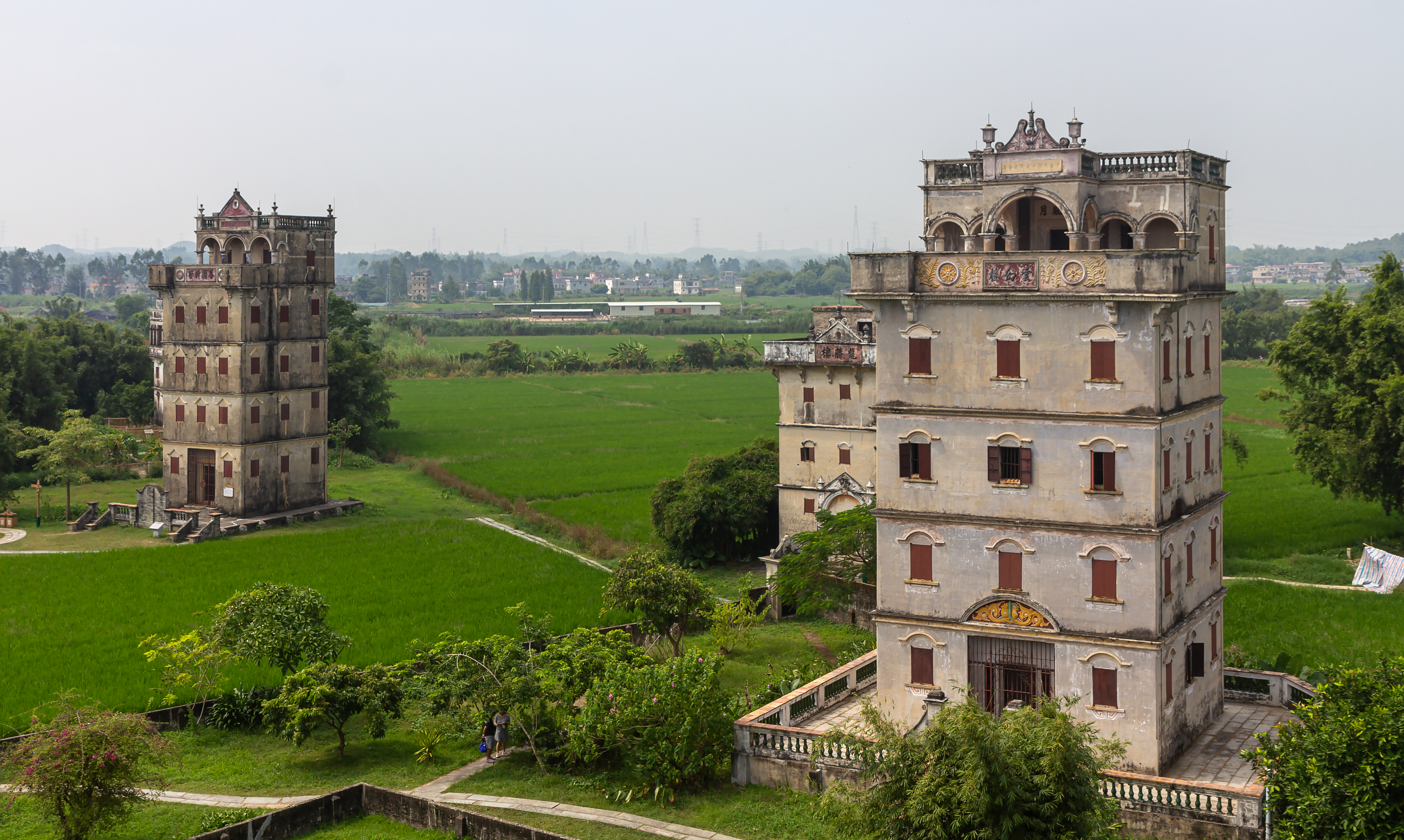
Zili Village of Kaiping Diaolou

In 2007, UNESCO named the Kaiping Diaolou and Villages (开平碉楼与村落) in China as a World Heritage Site. UNESCO wrote, "...the Diaolou … display a complex and flamboyant fusion of Eastern and Western structural and decorative forms. They reflect the significant role of émigré Kaiping people in the development of several countries in South Asia, Australasia, and North America, during the late 19th and early 20th centuries, and the close links between overseas Kaiping and their ancestral homes. The property inscribed here consists of four groups of Diaolou, totaling some 1,800 tower houses in their village settings." Today, approximately 1,833 diaolou remain standing in Kaiping and approximately 500 in Taishan. Although the diaolou served mainly as protection against forays by bandits, a few of them also served as living quarters. Kaiping has traditionally been a region of major emigration abroad and a melting pot of ideas and trends brought back from Overseas Chinese. As a result, many diaolou incorporate architectural features from China and from the West. Tong Laus which are mixed-used buildings where the ground floor is reserved for commercial use and the top floors for residential are also prominent in the region, as are traditional Lingnan architecture aesthetics which are commonly found throughout Guangdong Province.

== Economy and business ==
Besides dominating the entertainment industry, they dominant Hong Kong's Business Industry, founding companies such as the Bank of East Asia (東亞銀行), Lee Kum Kee (李錦記), Hang Lung Properties, Maxim's Catering (美心), Li & Fung (利豐), Beijing Air Catering Ltd, Hysan Development (希慎興業) and many others. The first richest man in Asia was Lui Che-woo.

Famous overseas Taishanese businessmen includes Loke Yew, the richest man of Malaysia in his time and who made significant impact in the growth of Kuala Lumpur and was one of founder fathers of Victoria institution. Jack Yan who founded his company Lucire, is a magazine publisher in New Zealand and he also owns a software firm that created over 100 typeface designs himself for the firm and inspired other local typeface designers such as Kris Sowersby to pursue careers in that industry. Norman Kwong who is the lieutenant governor of Alberta, is also president and manager of Calgary Stampeders a Canadian football league.

== Academics ==
Sze Yup or Jiangmen is considered the home of Chinese Academician town: The total of academicians, the highest academic title in China given by the Chinese Academy of Sciences, is 31 people. Some of the more well-known academics are:

- Wu Lien-teh – First Han Chinese and Malaysian Chinese to be nominated for a Nobel prize in physiology or Medicine
- Chu Ching-wu – Selected as the Best Researcher in the U.S. by U.S. News & World Report in 1990.
- Nancy Ip – member of the Chinese Academy of Sciences and the World Academy of Sciences.
- Vivian Wing-Wah Yam – 2011 L'Oréal-UNESCO for Women in Science awardee
- Huan Yong – China's modern plant taxonomy founder
- Chen Haozhu – won the national, military science and technology progress award
- Albert Chan (professor) – a Hong Kong professor of chemistry and traditional Chinese medicine
- Liang Sili – Chinese Engineer. Chief Designer of inertial guidance platforms for Chinese ballistic missiles
- Cai Ruixian – Received the Chinese Academy of Science and Technology Progress Award, Chinese Academy of Natural Science Award
- Li Shaozhen – improve cataract surgery quality in the introduction of technology and innovation

== Overseas ==
Because the history of going abroad is long and there are many people sojourning widely in various districts, Taishan is called the "No.1 Homeland of Overseas Chinese". The Taishanese diaspora is distributed in 91 countries and regions of the five continents including US, Canada, Hong Kong, Colombia, Cuba, Mexico, Malaysia, Singapore, and Australia.

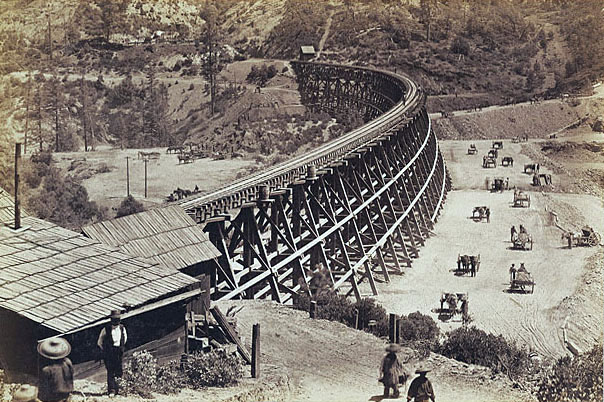
Trestle, c. 1869: Carleton Watkins

Taishanese have had a large influence in the course of Asian-American history, as they were the first Asian Americans to be elected as Governors, Mayors and U.S congressmen in the continental United States. The first international celebrity of Asian descent and America's first ace in World War II. They also represented the largest Asian community in America and made a significant contribution in building the First transcontinental railroad of United States. The Central Pacific Railroad (CPRR) is the former name of the railroad network built between California and Utah that formed part of the "First Transcontinental Railroad" in North America. About 12,000 such emigrant workers were employed as laborers by the Central Pacific Railroad representing 90 percent of the entire work force. J. O. Wilder, a Central Pacific-Southern Pacific employee, commented that “The Chinese were as steady, hard-working a set of men as could be found. With the exception of a few whites at the west end of Tunnel No. 6, the laboring force was entirely composed of Chinamen with white foremen. A single Irish foreman with a gang of 30 to 40 Chinese men generally constituted the force at work at each end of a tunnel; of these, 12 to 15 worked on the heading and the rest on the bottom removing material. When a gang was small or the men needed elsewhere, the bottoms were worked with fewer men or stopped so as to keep the headings going.” The laborers usually worked three shifts of 8 hours each per day, while the foremen worked in two shifts of 12 hours each, managing the laborers.

The Sun Ning Railway (AKA Sunning Railway and Xinning Railway) 新寧鐵路 (Pinyin: Xinning Tielu) was a standard-gauge railway in the Pearl River Delta in Guangdong Province founded in 1906 by a man of Taishanese origin Chin Gee Hee 陳宜禧 (Pinyin: Chen Yixi) and Yu Shek 余灼 (Pinyin: Yu Zhuo). It was South China's second railway and one of only three railways in pre-1949 China built solely with private Chinese capital.

== Notable Taishanese people ==
- Lai Man-Wai (Xinhui, Guangdong) – father of Hong Kong cinema
- Feng Ru (Enping, Guangdong) – father of Chinese aviation
- Liang Sicheng (Xinhui, Guangdong) – father of modern Chinese architecture
- Hu Die (Heshan, Guangdong) – empress of Chinese cinema
- Chen Yunchang (Taishan, Guangdong) – Shanghainese actress and the "3rd Empress of Chinese Film" (连获三届"中国电影皇后") who starred some popular movies including "Mulan Joins the Army" in 1939.
- Lee Ya-Ching (Enping, Guangdong) – China's first lady of flight
- Dai AiLian (Xinhui, Guangdong) – mother of Chinese dance ("中国舞蹈之母").
- Lily Leung (Xinhui, Guangdong) – Hong Kong's first TV Actress
- Lau Kar-leung (Xinhui, Guangdong), China – Hong Kong–based Chinese actor, filmmaker, choreographer and martial artist.
- Shawn Yue (Taishan, Guangdong) – Hong Kong actor, singer and former model
- Joey Yung (Xinhui, Guangdong) – Cantopop singer and actress from Hong Kong
- Andy Lau (Xinhui, Guangdong) – Hong Kong Cantopop singer, film actor and producer; one of the Four Heavenly Kings of Cantopop (四大天王)
- Tony Leung Chiu-Wai (Taishan, Guangdong) – Hong Kong film and television actor
- Danny Chan (Taishan, Guangdong) – Hong Kong actor, singer and songwriter; his hometown is Sijiu, Taishan.
- Hung Sin-nui (Kaiping, Guangdong) – Cantonese opera master and movie actress in China and Hong Kong
- Kenny Kwan (Kaiping, Guangdong) – Hong Kong actor and singer; former member of Hong Kong boy band Boy'z
- Gillian Chung (Xinhui, Guangdong) – Hong Kong actress and singer; a member of Hong Kong music group Twins
- Beyond (band) (Taishan, Guangdong) – Hong Kong rock band; all of its band members have Taishanese ancestry.
- Karl Maka (Taishan, Guangdong) – Hong Kong producer, director, actor and presenter; his hometown is Chonglou, Taishan.
- Donnie Yen (Taishan, Guangdong) – Hong Kong martial artist, actor, film director, action choreographer and film producer
- Alfred Cheung (Kaiping, Guangdong) – Chinese actor, director, writer and producer
- Raymond Wong (film presenter) (Heshan, Guangdong) – Hong Kong actor, film director, producer, screenwriter and presenter
- Ekin Cheng (Enping, Guangdong) – Hong Kong actor and Cantopop singer
- Kenny Bee (Xinhui, Guangdong) – Hong Kong singer, musician and actor; a member of the Hong Kong English pop and Cantopop band The Wynners
- Alan Tam (Xinhui, Guangdong) – Hong Kong Cantopop and English pop singer and actor
- Kenny Ho (Enping, Guangdong) – Hong Kong and Taiwanese actor
- Hacken Lee (Xinhui, Guangdong) – Hong Kong–based Cantopop singer and lyricist, actor, Master of Ceremonies and football sportscaster
- Tiffany Lam (Xinhui, Guangdong) – former Hong Kong TVB actress; winner of the 2002 Miss Hong Kong pageant and runner-up at the 2003 Miss Chinese International pageant.
- Justin Lo (Kaiping, Guangdong) – American singer-songwriter, actor and record producer working in Hong Kong.
- George Lam (Xinhui, Guangdong) – Hong Kong–based Cantopop singer and actor
- Gigi Lai (Xinhui, Guangdong) – Hong Kong actress and singer.
- Bobby Au-Yeung (Xinhui, Guangdong) – Hong Kong actor
- Adam Cheng (Taishan, Guangdong) – Hong Kong TVB actor and Cantopop singer; husband of Lydia Shum (肥肥)
- Joyce Cheng (Taishan, Guangdong) – Hong Kong musician, writer, actor and performer. She is the daughter of famous Hong Kong comedian Lydia Shum and veteran actor Adam Cheng.
- Chapman To (Taishan, Guangdong) – Hong Kong actor
- Jaime Chik (Kaiping, Guangdong) – Hong Kong TVB actress.
- William So (Xinhui, Guangdong) – Hong Kong Cantopop singer
- Stephanie Cheng (Enping, Guangdong) – Hong Kong Cantopop singer
- Edmond Leung (Taishan, Guangdong) – Hong Kong singer-songwriter, record producer, actor, TV host
- Wong He (Taishan, Guangdong) – Hong Kong actor, model and former policeman
- Myolie Wu (Taishan, Guangdong) – Hong Kong actress and singer
- Ti Lung (Xinhui, Guangdong) – Hong Kong actor known for his roles in martial arts and gangster movies
- Maggie Cheung Ho-yee (Taishan, Guangdong) – Hong Kong actress
- Bosco Wong (Jiangmen, Guangdong) – Hong Kong actor under TVB management and singer under East Asia Music.
- Gigi Leung (Xinhui, Guangdong) – Hong Kong singer and actress
- Moses Chan (Taishan, Guangdong) – Hong Kong actor
- Michelle Yim (Xinhui, Guangdong) – Hong Kong actress
- Deep Ng (Xinhui, Guangdong) – Hong Kong actor, singer and songwriter
- Christine Ng (Taishan, Guangdong) – Hong Kong actress
- Flora Chan (Taishan, Guangdong) – Hong Kong actress
- Pakho Chau (Kaiping, Guangdong) – Hong Kong singer
- David Li (Heshan, Guangdong) – chairman and chief executive of the Bank of East Asia (東亞銀行); his grandfather founded the Bank
- Ronnie Chan (Taishan, Guangdong) – Hong Kong billionaire
- Victor Fung (Heshan, Guangdong) – group chairman of the Li & Fung (利豐) group of companies; his grandfather founded the company
- Lee Hysan (Xinhui, Guangdong) – land developer and entrepreneur in Hong Kong who founded the modern-day Hysan Development Company Limited (希慎興業)
- Dr. James Tak Wu (Taishan, Guangdong) – founder of Maxim's Catering (美心)
- Annie Wu Suk-ching (Taishan, Guangdong) – Hong Kong–based Chinese businesswoman and activist who founded Beijing Air Catering Ltd, the first joint venture company in the People's Republic of China; she is the daughter of Dr. James Tak Wu.

=== Artists ===
- Alan Chin – San Francisco Bay Area contemporary artist
- Tyrus Wong – painter, muralist, ceramicist, lithographer, designer and kite maker
- James Hong – former president of the Association of Asian/Pacific American Artists (AAPAA)

=== Actors ===
- Brandon Soo Hoo – Chinese American actor
- Hayden Szeto – Chinese Canadian actor

=== Business ===
- Kwong Sue Duk – merchant in Australia, respected and influential amongst the Chinese and European communities
- Wong Ah Fook – builder of many famous Johor heritage buildings in Malaysia
- Chin Gee Hee – labor contractor and railway entrepreneur who contributed railway workers for the American railway project.
- Jack Yan – founder of Lucire, a fashion magazine publisher in New Zealand.
- Robert H. Lee – Vancouver-based businessman, investor and philanthropist
- Loke Wan Tho – founder of Cathay Organisation in Singapore and Malaysia
- Thomas Tam – Hong Kong-born Canadian businessman
- Qiu Liben – Chinese intellectual
- Milton Wong – Canadian banker and philanthropist
- Lui Che Woo - Hong Kong businessman
- Yip Hon – Macanese tycoon
- Yip Sang – Canadian businessman
- Sir Lee Quo-wei – Hong Kong businessman

=== Athletes ===
- Norman Kwong – Lieutenant-Governor of Alberta and professional football player, president of the Calgary Stampeders.
- Wan Chi-keung – Hong Kong footballer and actor
- Yi Jianlian – Chinese basketball player
- Tam Kong-pak – Hong Kong-based Chinese footballer
- He Jianbin – Chinese swimmer
- Yu Zhuocheng – Chinese diver
- Guan Weizhen – Chinese badminton player
- Chen Xiaomin – Chinese retired weightlifter
- Richard Tom – Chinese American weightlifter and Olympic medalist.
- Kim Ng – Major League Baseball executive
- Tan Sixin – gymnast

=== Education ===
- Wu Lien-teh – First Han Chinese and Malaysian Chinese to be nominated for a Nobel Prize in physiology/medicine
- Chu Ching-wu – Chinese-American researcher
- Li Enliang – Chinese civil engineer and educator.
- Chin Siu Dek – (AKA Jimmy H. Woo) – martial artist of Sanba and a Grandmaster of Kung Fu San Soo.
- William Poy Lee – San Francisco author who wrote The Eighth Promise.
- Ken Hom – Chinese American chef, author and television show presenter.
- Betty Kwan Chinn – winner of the 2008 Minerva Award.
- Wing-tsit Chan – scholar of Chinese philosophy and religion, active in the United States.
- Maxine Hong Kingston – Chinese American author known for writing The Woman Warrior and other books in the genre of Chinese American literature. Her parents were from Xinhui, Guangdong.
- Liu Junxian – Mathematician, director of China Mathematical Society.

=== Historical ===
- Liang Qichao – scholar, journalist, philosopher and reformist and was called Mind of Modern China
- Kang Youwei – prominent politician and Leader Gongche Shangshu movement who influenced Guangxu Emperor and Chinese politicians
- Tang Shaoyi – first prime minister of the Republic of China
- Wu Tingfang – first ethnic Chinese barrister, diplomat and politician who served as Minister of Foreign Affairs
- Loke Yew the richest man of Malaysia in his time and made significant impact in the growth of Kuala Lumpur, and was one of founder fathers of Victoria institution.
- Anna May Wong – the first Asian and Chinese American to become international movie star and the first Asian-American to be minted in U.S. Currency.
- Chen Yunchang – a very famous Shanghainese actress. She starred some popular movies including Mulan Joins the Army. She is the 3rd "Chinese Film Queen"; while the 1st is Hu Die who is also of Sze Yup origin.
- Gary Locke – the first person of Chinese American/Asian descent to become a governor within the continental United States. He was also the first known person of Chinese heritage to serve as the Commerce Secretary of the US.
- James Wong Howe – master cinematographer of Hollywood.
- Arthur Chin – America's first ace in World War II.
- Raymond Kwok Chow (A.K.A. Shrimp Boy) – San Francisco Chinatown mobster, Dragon Head of the San Francisco Chapter Chinese Freemasons
- Judy Chu She is the first Chinese American woman ever elected to the U.S. Congress. Chu was reelected in the 2010 United States midterm elections, defeating Republican challenger Edward "Ed" Schmerling.
- Michael Woo He served as the first Asian American on the Los Angeles City Council from 1985 to 1993. Woo chaired the Citywide Planning commission, until 1993 when he became the first Asian American to run for the mayor of a major city.
- Szeto Wah – He is the first Chinese and first person from Asia to have received a Homo Homini Award. He is regarded as one of the most influential Hong Kong politicians of pan-democracy movement and is respected by many pro-democracy citizens from China and Hong Kong.
- Alexander Yee – calculated World Record digits of Pi.
- Chen Baisha – One of China most famous Confucian scholars, poets, and calligraphers, during the Ming Dynasty
- Chan Heung – Is one of the martial arts legend of China and founder of the Choy Li Fut that became one of China's most popular fighting system.
- Jeong Yim – He is Chan Heung best student, and is recognized as an important contributor to the expansion of Choy Li Fut. His life is filled with heroism, myths, stories and legends and was a significant influential character in the novels of anti-Qing organizations.
- Kwan Tak-hing – Is In total he made over 130 films. No one else in cinema history has portrayed the same person as many times he did.
- Chin Siu Dek (Jimmy H. Woo) – the man responsible for bringing Kung Fu San Soo

=== Politicians ===
- Fernando Chui The chief executive of Macau
- Fernando Cheung – a HK politician the vice-chairman of the Labour Party, was also a physician and head of an Asian rights organization in San Francisco.
- Wu Chaoshu – became Foreign Affairs Minister and served as Minister to the United States from 1928 to 1931,
- Wen Tsung-yao – Deputy president of Tibet, and a Politician and diplomat of Qing.
- Mei Quong Tart – A prominent businessman, activist and philanthropist who had a significant impact against anti-Chinese sentiment in Australia
- John Tsang – Financial Secretary of Hong Kong.
- Evan Low – the youngest Asian American mayor in the United States.
- Leland Yee – California State Senator. In 2004 Yee became the first Asian American to be appointed Speaker pro Tempore.
- Margaret Chin – New York City-based American politician. A Democrat, she was elected to the New York City Council (First elected to this position) on November 3, 2009, to represent District 1 in Lower Manhattan.
- Bill Lann Lee – United States Assistant Attorney General for Civil Rights, Clinton Administration.
- Chaovarat Chanweerakul – Acting prime minister of Thailand and cabinet minister
- Julius Chan – former Prime Minister of Papua New Guinea of An Nan Jiang Chao village in Doushan.
- Matt Fong (A.K.A. Matt Kwong) (1953–2011) – former Treasurer of the State of California.
- Wong Kim Ark – defendant in United States v. Wong Kim Ark, 169 U.S. 649 (1898).
- Fernando Cheung a HK politician the vice-chairman of the Labour Party, was also a physician and head of an Asian rights organization in San Francisco.
- Patrick Yu – Hong Kong lawyer and Crown Counsel, and founder of its first law school.
- Inky Mark – is a Canadian politician and a former member of the Canadian House of Commons and is also a member of the Conservative Party of Canada.
- Yu Hung-Chun – Political figure who served as premier of the Republic of China on Taiwan between 1954 and 1958.
- Wu Shih-wen – was the Minister of National Defense of the Republic of China in 2000–2002.
- Art Lee – Lee was elected to the Canadian House of Commons as a candidate of the Liberal Party of Canada to represent the electoral district of Vancouver East. From 1984 to 1987, he served as the leader of the British Columbia Liberal Party.
- Liang Xiang – representative in the fifth, sixth, and seventh National People's Congresses.
- Delbert E. Wong – was the first Chinese American judge in the continental United States.
- Delbert Gee – is a retired Superior Court Judge in Alameda County for the State of California in the United States of America. His father was Taishanese and his mother was Shanghainese.
- Adrienne Clarkson is Chinese of Irish and Portuguese descent – Born to a Taishanese father and Hakka mother, she is the Honourable as a former Governor General of Canada,

=== Others ===
- Jessica Soho – Filipino journalist and news presenter who is a granddaughter of a Chinese immigrant from Kaiping, Taishan, Guangdong, China.

== See also ==
- Taishanese
