= Yau (surname) =

Yau is a surname. It is a romanisation of multiple surnames in Cantonese speaking regions (including Hong Kong) based on different varieties of Chinese, as well as a surname in other cultures.

In the Hausa language and Northern Nigeria, Niger and Ghana culture, the name "Yau" or its variant forms "Ya'u" and Arma Ya'u is a common male name and surname and it is a derivative of the Arabic name Zakariya the father of John the Baptist (Yahya), often used as a shortened form. It's a popular name among the Hausa people and other communities in Northern Nigeria, often used as a first name for boys. The name is pronounced as "YAH-oo".

Among respondents to the 2000 United States census, Yau was the 394th-most common surname among Asian Pacific Americans, and 10,881th-most common overall, with 2,686 bearers (93.9% of whom identified as Asian/Pacific Islander).

== Cantonese romanisation of 丘 ==
- Shing-Tung Yau (丘成桐; born 1949), Chinese-born American mathematician
- Stephen Shing-Toung Yau (丘成栋; born 1952), Hong Kong-born American mathematician, brother of Shing-Tung Yau
- Algernon Yau (丘應樺; born 1959), Hong Kong businessperson and politician
- Alan Yau (丘德威; born 1962), Hong Kong-born British restaurateur
- Yau Kin Wai (丘健威; born 1973), Hong Kong football defender

== Cantonese romanisation of 邱 ==
- Yau Leung (邱良; 1941–1997), Hong Kong street photographer
- Yau Lop Poon (邱立本; born 1950), Hong Kong journalist
- Edward Yau (邱騰華; born 1960), Hong Kong government official
- Herman Yau (邱禮濤; born 1961), Hong Kong film director
- Chingmy Yau (邱淑貞; born 1968), Hong Kong actress
- Benny Yau (邱穟恆; born 1980), Hong Kong-born Canadian television presenter
- Yung Yau (邱勇), Hong Kong housing studies professor
- Stanley Yau (邱士縉), member of Hong Kong boy band Mirror
- Tiger Yau (邱傲然), member of Hong Kong boy band Mirror

== Cantonese romanisation of 尤 ==
- Yau Lit (尢列; 1864–1936), Chinese revolutionary
- Carrie Yau (尤曾家麗; born 1955), Hong Kong government official

== Cantonese romanisation of 游 ==
- King-Wai Yau (游景威; born 1948), Chinese-born American neuroscientist
- Patrick Yau (游達志; born 1964), Hong Kong film director
- Yau Nai-hoi (游乃海; born 1968), Hong Kong screenwriter
- Yau Kam Leung (游錦良; born 1985), Hong Kong football defender
- Neo Yau (游學修; born 1990), Hong Kong actor
- Yau Wai-ching (游蕙禎; born 1991), Hong Kong politician

== Mandarin romanisation of 姚 ==
Yau is the spelling in Gwoyeu Romatzyh (a less common-system of transcribing Mandarin Chinese) of the surname spelled Yào in the more widespread pinyin system.

- Horng-Tzer Yau (姚鴻澤; born 1959), Taiwanese-born American mathematician
- John Yau (born 1950), American poet of Chinese descent

== Hausa and other African ==
People with a Hausa surname Yau or Ya'u or Arma Ya'u:

- Sahabi Alhaji Yaú (born 1956), Nigerian politician
- Yau Usman Idris born in Kauru, Local Government Area of Kaduna State., Nigerian Nuclear Scientist
- Ya'u Umar GwajoGwajo, Nigerian politician
- Hon. Justice Ya'u Ibrahim Dakwang, Nigerian politician
- Arma Ya’u Hamisu Bichi, Nigerian academician and scientist
- Abdulsalam Ya'u Gitai, Nigerian academician and scientist
- Yau Usman Dachia, Nigerian politician
- Zakari Ya’u Galadima Zakariyau Galadima, Nigerian politician
- Garba Ya’u, Nigerian politician
- Justice Aisha Ya’u, Public servant and lawyer
- Sule Ya’u, Nigerian academician and scientist
- Ya'u Shu'aibu Haruna, Nigerian academician and scientist

== Other ==
People with a non-Chinese surname Yau, or whose names as written in Chinese characters are not available:

- Yairo Yau (born 1989), Panamanian footballer
- Stephen Sik-Sang Yau, American computer scientist
- David Yau Yau, South Sudanese government administrator and former insurrectionist leader
