= Bell Church (temple) =

Chinese temple in Benguet, Philippines

- 钟零善坛
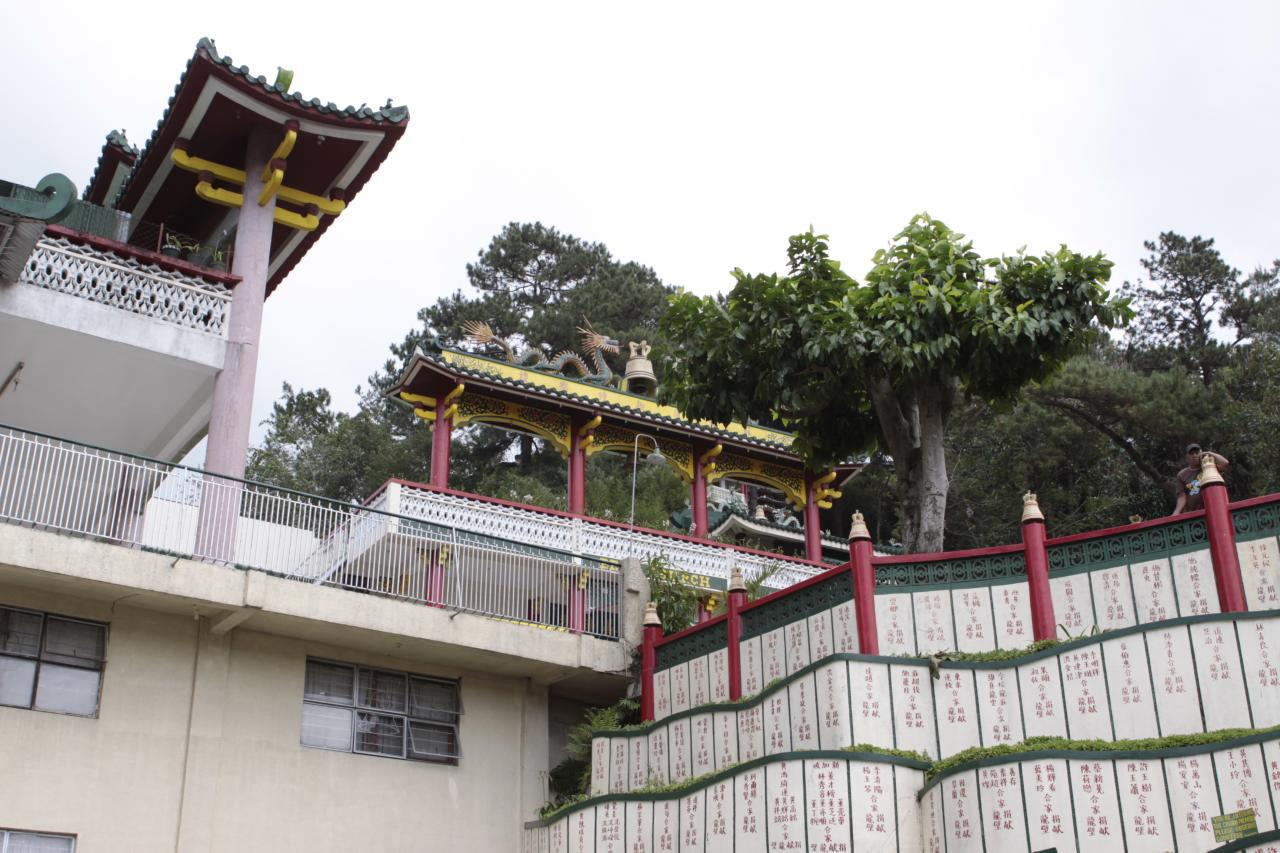
- The Bell Church, 2009

Religion
- Affiliation: Bell Church
- Province: Benguet
- Region: Cordillera Administrative Region
- Patron: 5 patron saints

Location
- Municipality: La Trinidad
- Country: Philippines
- Interactive map of Bell Church
- Coordinates: 16°25′53.1″N 120°35′54.5″E

Architecture
- Style: Chinese temple architecture
- Founder: Ng Pee with other members

The Bell Church (simplified Chinese: 钟零善坛 / 趣善钟坛 / 菲律滨趣钟总坛 / 济公坛; traditional Chinese: 鐘零善壇 / 趣善鐘壇 / 菲律濱趣鐘總壇 / 濟公壇) is a Chinese temple of the Chinese Filipino indigenous religious syncretistic organization of the same name in La Trinidad, Benguet, Philippines.

It is an important religious and cultural site for the local Chinese Filipino community and one of the tourist sites of both La Trinidad and the neighboring city of Baguio featuring in local films in the 1970s until the 1990s.

== History ==
The Bell Church was founded on August 4, 1960 in Benguet, when the area was still part of Mountain Province, by Taishanese Cantonese Chinese immigrants from Taishan, Canton (now Guangdong), China led by Ng Pee.

In 1954, he first preached in a dining hall of a restaurant but eventually transferred the place of worship to his residence along the Kilometer 6 mark in La Trinidad, due to increasing number of devotees. Then known as the "Chinese Buddhist Temple", the temple's membership is composed of primarily ethnic Chinese farmers. Membership continued to grow that the temple had to be moved again to its present site along the Kilometer 3 mark in the 1960s and has since then become known as the "Bell Church". With support from the local Chinese community, the house in the current site was converted to a temple.

== Site ==
The Chinese temple is situated in Barangay Balili of La Trinidad, Benguet near the border of the city of Baguio. It was previously located in the Ng family's residence in within the same town. It currently sits on a 10,000 square meters (110,000 sq ft) property and its hilly landscape according to the Ng clan reminds the Chinese devotees of their hometowns in Hong Kong and Mainland China.

== Architecture and design ==
The current site of the Bell Church was chosen due to "good Feng Shui". According to the Ng clan, the design of the Bell Church, both the interior and exterior, was made in accordance to the "guidance of saints" and was later improved upon through the same. An arch ornated with colorful images of dragons and Chinese inscriptions is situated at the entrance of the temple. The site's pagodas features images of saints and the Buddha. A bust of the founder, Ng Pee is hosted within the temple grounds. Two octagon ponds with lotuses are installed in front of the main temple structure. The octagon motif known as the Bagua in Chinese culture represents the concept of rebirth and immortality, and the lotus flowers signifies purity and beauty. The landscaping was done by the Chinese.

== Significance ==
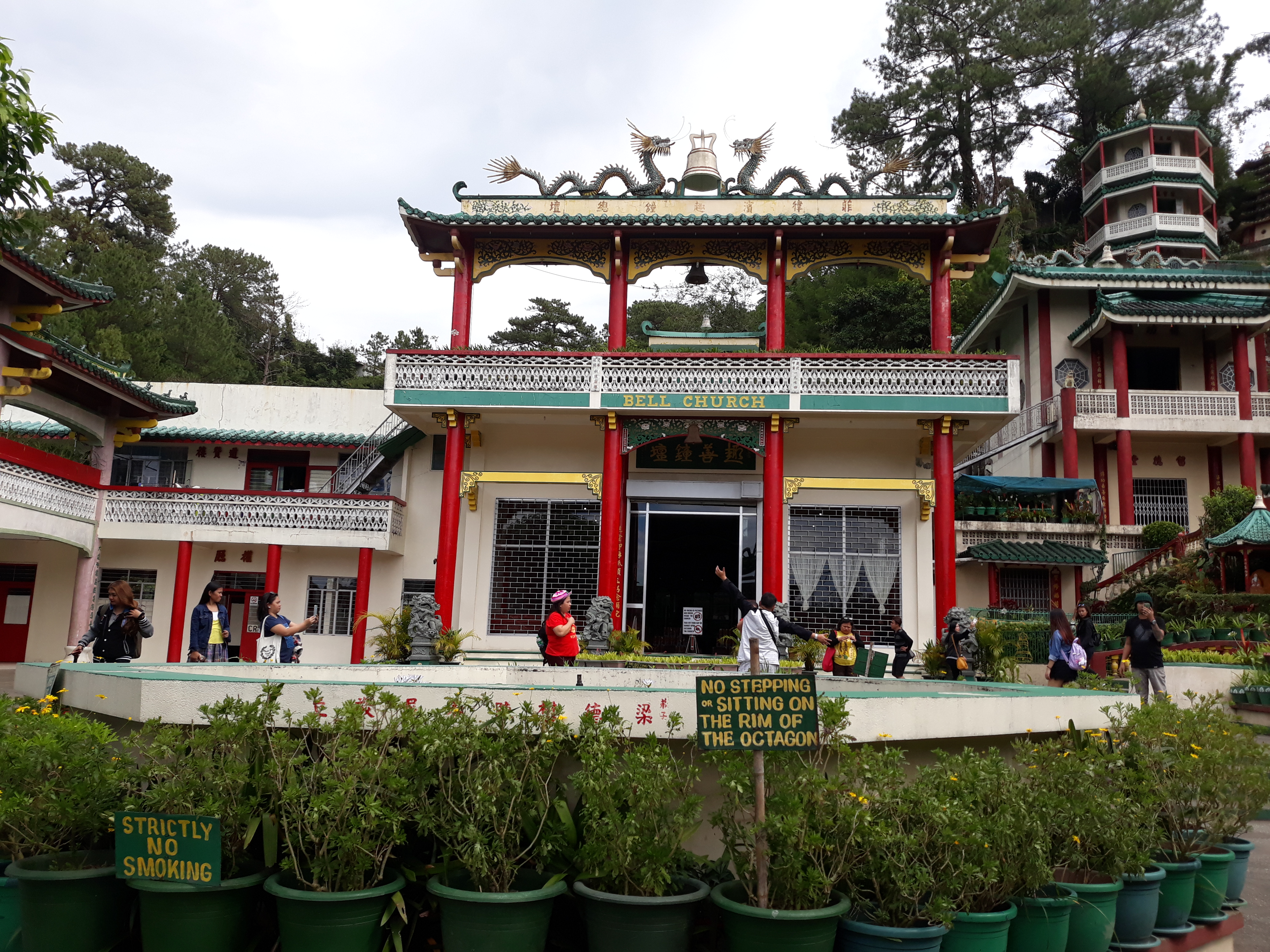
The Bell Church

=== Religious and spiritual ===
As of 2014, Manuel Quirino serves as the President of the Bell Church and Reverend Elias Ng as the temple's spiritual medium. Ng is believed to be able to read the words of the temple's saints through spreading some sort of powder on a glass. Devotees are able to ask Ng questions from the saints and Ng relays the answer given by the saints. The spirit of the dead are prayed by family members on the temple's octagonal prayer temple so that they could go to heaven. The Hungry Ghost Festival (known as Poh Toh in Hokkien Chinese: 普渡; Pe̍h-ōe-jī: phó͘-tō͘) is also observed by devotees in the temple. The bell of the Bell Church is primarily used for spiritual purposes.

The 1997 book The Ethnic Chinese in Baguio and the Cordillera Philippines, asserts the presence of native Filipino devotees. The book also states that the Bell Church's devotees use the temple as an oracle to query answers regarding their concerns regarding business, marriage, and other personal queries.

The Bell Church's five patron saints represents five major religions; Taoism, Confucianism, Islam, Christianity, and Buddhism.

=== Other cultural significance ===
In the past the bell of the Bell Church was used to warn the local community regarding calamities. It has also been promoted as a tourist site by both the local government of La Trinidad and neighboring Baguio. It was recognized in 1970 by then-Tourism Minister Jose Aspiras as a "major tourist destination". The temple has also served as the filming locations for feature films from the 1970s to the 1990s. Many of these films were local kung fu films and some were romantic films. It has also served as a venue for cultural festivals by the Chinese-Filipino community and also hosts a gymnasium where instructors give lessons on dragon and lion dancing, and martial arts.
