= The Stranger (1995 film) =

- Official VHS cover
- Directed by: Fritz Kiersch
- Written by: Gregory Poirier
- Produced by: Donald P. Borchers; Gregory Poirier
- Starring: Kathy Long; Andrew Divoff; Eric Pierpoint; Robin Lynn Heath; Ash Adams; Ginger Lynn Allen; Hunter von Leer
- Cinematography: Christopher Walling
- Edited by: Tony Mizgalski
- Music by: Kevin Kiner
- Distributed by: Columbia TriStar Home Entertainment
- Release date: March 1995 (U.S.)
- Running time: 98 minutes
- Country: United States
- Language: English

The Stranger is a 1995 American martial arts action thriller film directed by Fritz Kiersch and starring former professional kickboxing champion Kathy Long. The plot of the film is based on the premise of the Clint Eastwood classic film High Plains Drifter (1973), transposed onto an outlaw biker club subculture. The film was released directly to home video in 1995.

== Plot ==
For years, the tiny desert town of Lakeview, Arizona has been ruled by a vicious outlaw biker gang led by a man known as Angel. The residents have been terrified into submission, and the local Sheriff Gordon Cole hasn't been the same since the gang raped and murdered his fiancée Bridget for trying to bring evidence of their crimes to the FBI. Tormented by grief and alcoholism, he no longer has the will to stand against them.

One day, a mysterious young woman dressed in black leather rides into town on a motorcycle and promptly starts killing members of Angel's gang. When Cole attempts to question her about the murders, he notices her striking resemblance to his fiancée and is instantly attracted to her, much to the chagrin of local shopkeeper Sally Womack, who has wanted Cole for herself ever since Bridget's demise.

Fearing retaliation from Angel (who is currently out of town) for the deaths of his men, Sally implores Cole to arrest the woman, but he refuses to take any action against her. Undeterred, Sally enlists the help of Cole's corrupt Deputy Steve Stowe and the Mayor of Lakeview to capture her, but their plan ultimately backfires resulting in Stowe's death. Meanwhile, the woman – a skilled hand-to-hand combatant – continues to eliminate the bikers one by one as she awaits Angel's return.

During her time in Lakeview, the woman gets acquainted with several of the townspeople, most notably Bridget's younger sister Gordet, who has been living as a vagrant ever since witnessing her sister's brutal death. After hearing her story, the woman takes the heavily traumatized girl under her wing and tries to help her reclaim her life.

Eventually, Cole becomes romantically involved with the woman but is unable to learn anything about her origin. She is undoubtedly the mirror image of his fiancée Bridget, but if the two are related, the woman gives no indication. However, when the subject of Angel is brought up, she angrily admonishes Cole for his inaction, causing him to storm off in a rage. When he tries to confess his love to her, she cryptically responds that he's "in love with a ghost".

With Angel's return imminent, the residents of Lakeview begin a full-scale evacuation. Although Sally tries to convince Cole to leave with her, he chooses to stay behind and help the woman defend the town. With Gordet acting as a lookout, Cole and the woman are able to work together to dispatch the few remaining members of Angel's gang. Finally, the woman meets Angel face to face on the street, where they fight to the death. Victorious, the woman bids farewell to Cole and Gordet and rides off into the sunset, leaving both of them and the audience to speculate about her identity.

== Cast ==
- Kathy Long as "The Stranger"
- Andrew Divoff as Angel
- Eric Pierpoint as Sheriff Gordon Cole
- Robin Lynn Heath as Gordet
- Ash Adams as Deputy Steve Stowe
- Ginger Lynn Allen as Sally Womack
- Hunter von Leer as Mayor Carl Perkins
- Sandra Lee Williams as Darlene
- Paul Hampton as Buck
- Francis X. McCarthy as Havel
- Sandra Kinder as Franny
- David Anthony Marshall as "Harvard"
- Danny Trejo as "Hawk"
- Nils Allen Stewart as "Jonesy"
- Faith Minton as Kyra
- Randy Vasquez as Marcus
- Jeff Cadiente as Yeadley
- Andre Rosey Brown as Tony Brown
- Chris Pedersen as Junior Katz
- Robert Winley as Garrett Katz
- Billy Maddox as Eliot Katz

== Production ==
=== Filming ===
The Stranger was filmed in 1994 at Goldfield and Coaldale, Nevada.

== Bibliography ==
- Phillips, Gene (January 18, 2023). "The Stranger (1995)".
