= Lena Åkesson =

Swedish boxer (born 1967)

Personal information
- Nationality: Sweden
- Born: Lena Åkesson; August 10, 1967 (age 59) Stockholm, Sweden
- Height: 5 ft 8 in (173 cm)
- Weight: Lightweight

Boxing career
- Reach: 68 in (170 cm)

Boxing record
- Total fights: 15
- Wins: 14
- Win by KO: 8
- Losses: 1
- Draws: 0
- No contests: 0

Lena Åkesson (born August 10, 1967, in Stockholm, Sweden) is a former world-class female professional boxer whose career took place in the late 1990s. Trained by Luis Lagerman and Angelo Dundee, Åkesson racked up a pro record of 14–1 with 8 KOs, her only loss coming in a 10-round decision to Melissa Del Valle for the WIBF title, in a bout that resulted in a controversial split decision in Del Valle's favor.

== Professional boxing record ==
17 fights	15 wins	2 losses
By knockout	8	0
By decision	7	2

No.	Result	Record	Opponent	Type	Round, time	Date	Location	Notes
15	Win	14–1	(United States) Gwen Smith	PTS	6	1999-12-04	(United States) Augusta, Georgia, USA	
14	Loss	13–1	(United States) Melissa Del Valle	UD	10	1999-08-14	(United States) Loews Hotel, Miami Beach, Florida, USA	For Women's IBF Super featherweight title.
13	Win	13–0	(Hungary) Szilvia Porteleki	TKO	3 (4)	1999-06-26	Hala Ludowa, Wrocław, Poland	
12	Win	12–0	(United States) Beverly Szymanski	UD	6	1999-04-29	(United States) Bossier City, Louisiana, USA	
11	Win	11–0	(United States) Kelley Jones	TKO	1 (4), 1:59	1999-04-09	(United States) Jaycees Community Center, Waldorf, Maryland, USA	
10	Win	10–0	(United States) Carla Witherspoon	TKO	3 (4)	1998-12-12	(United States) The Ritz, Raleigh, North Carolina, USA	
9	Win	9–0	(United States) Alicia Sparks	TKO	1 (4), 0:54	1998-07-09	(United States) Grand Casino Avoyelles, Marksville, Louisiana, USA	
8	Win	8–0	(United States) Kathy Long	UD	4	1998-03-31	(United States) Casino Magic, Bay St. Louis, Mississippi, USA	
7	Win	7–0	(United Kingdom) Julie Cross	UD	4	1998-03-03	(United States) Coliseum, Corpus Christi, Texas, USA	
6	Win	6–0	(United States) Theresa Sweeney	KO	2 (4)	1997-12-08	(United States) Mobile, Alabama, USA	
5	Win	5–0	(United States) Patty Adams	TKO	1 (4), 0:40	1997-09-27	(United States) Steve Shepherd Boxing Gym, Riviera Beach, Florida, USA	
4	Win	4–0	(United States) Colleen Hodges	TKO	1 (4), 1:50	1997-07-05	(United States) Steve Shepherd Boxing Gym, Riviera Beach, Florida, USA	
3	Win	3–0	(United States) Rolanda Andrews	PTS	4	1997-04-25	(United States) Miami, Florida, USA	
2	Win	2–0	(United States) Cora Webber	PTS	4	1997-04-19	(United States) Community Center, Palm Bay, Florida, USA	
1	Win	1–0	(United States) Maria Hernandez	TKO	1 (4), 0:36	1997-03-22	(United States) Mahi Temple Shrine Auditorium, Miami, Florida, USA	Professional debut.

== See also ==
- List of female boxers
