= Kathy Long =

American martial artist

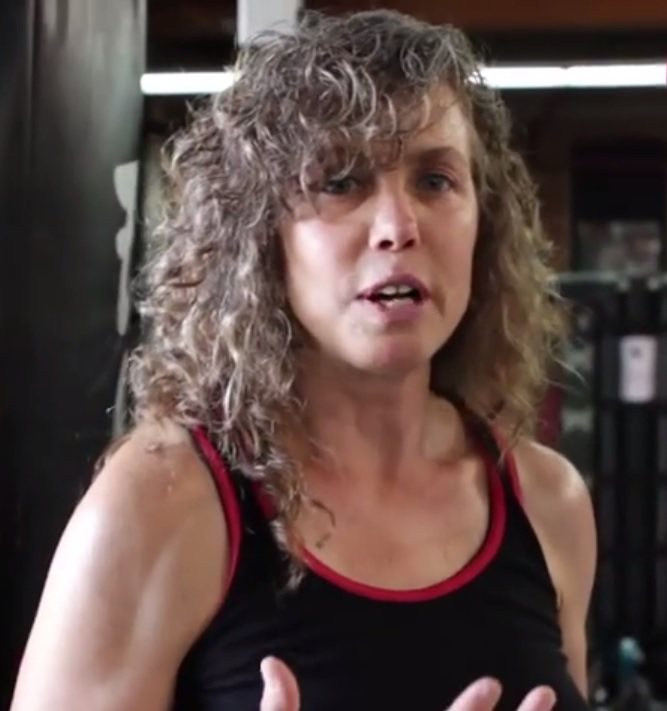
- Long in 2012
- Born: April 21, 1964 (age 62); St. Louis, Missouri, U.S.
- Other names: The Punisher, Queen of Mean, Princess of Pain
- Height: 5 ft 5 in (1.65 m)
- Style: Kickboxing, Boxing, Kung Fu San Soo
- Fighting out of: Los Angeles, California
- Team: Millennia MMA
- Rank: 10th Dan Black Belt in Kung Fu; 1st Dan Black Belt in Aikido

Professional boxing record
- Total: 3
- Wins: 2
- Losses: 1

Kickboxing record
- Total: 19
- Wins: 18
- Losses: 1

Mixed martial arts record
- Total: 2
- Wins: 2
- By decision: 2
- Losses: 0

Other information
- Boxing record from BoxRec
- Mixed martial arts record from Sherdog

Kathy Long (born April 21, 1964) is an American kickboxer, mixed martial artist, and actress. She has held various kickboxing championships, including two KICK World Kickboxing titles and the WKA and ISKA world titles.

Kathy (Kat) Long now teaches classes and private lessons in Seattle, Washington, as well as seminars internationally.

== Early life ==
Long was born in St. Louis, Missouri, and was raised in Sunny Mead, California. Later, she moved to Bakersfield where she trained in martial arts under Eric Nolan, who was her manager and trainer throughout her kickboxing career.

== Career ==
=== Martial arts ===
Long is a practitioner of the martial arts. She began her training in the Japanese art of Aikido, eventually earning a black belt in the system. Long would go on to earn a black belt in Chinese Kung Fu San Soo, eventually reaching the level of master in the style. She would train in Brazilian Jiu-Jitsu with the Machado family, as well as in Jeet Kune Do, Tae Kwon Do, Kali, and Wing Chun Kung Fu.

In the 1990s, Long was inducted into several sports halls of fame. These would include the Bob Elias' Sports Hall of Fame, Inside Kung Fu Hall of Fame ("Female of the Year"), and the Black Belt Magazine Black Belt Hall of Fame (1991 "Women of the Year"). She has appeared on the cover of 35 magazines. Between 1994 and 1998, Long authored a monthly column in Black Belt Magazine.

Long currently teaches at Seattle Integrated Martial Arts.

=== Kickboxing ===
Long became a professional kickboxer, and one of the top female fighters in the sport's history. She compiled an 18–1–1 record, winning five world titles in the process, and earning several nicknames including the "Queen of Mean", "Princess of Pain", and "The Punisher".

Some of her ring career highlights include wins over Ramona Gatto, Bonnie Canino, Japanese stars Yoshikai Wakana and Kyoko "Kamikaze" Miyazaki, French champion Dani Rocard, Canadian champion Nora Daigle and two wins over Denise Taylor. Her only loss as a professional kickboxer came in a Muay Thai match with Britain's Lisa Howarth at Pickett's Lock near London in February 1990. Long also fought North American bantamweight champion Pixie Elmore to a draw. Long also had an exhibition match with Lisa Smith.

=== Boxing ===
Kathy had a brief three-fight career in professional boxing between March and June 1998. She took two four-round decisions over Sandra Yard and lost a four-round decision to Lena Akesson retiring from boxing with a career record of two wins and one defeat - all four-rounders, all by decisions.

=== Mixed Martial Arts ===
Long provided commentary at the first Ultimate Fighting Championship event. On August 15, 2009, almost 16 years after she provided commentary for the very first Ultimate Fighting Championship, Long made her MMA debut defeating fighter Avery Vilche by decision at "Call to Arms" promotions Called Out event in Ontario, California.

In preparation for her debut Long trained with Betiss Mansouri and Romie Aram at Millennia MMA, Gokor Chivichyan and Gene LeBell at the Hayastan Academy, Ahmad Reese and Lisa Twight of Gym Jones, Javier Vazquez at Universal Martial Arts Center, and with Muay Thai and strength conditioning coach Maria Morales.

On August 22, 2015, after a six-year hiatus from MMA, Long returned to MMA competition at age 51. She fought under the Ascension Muay Thai and Kickboxing promotion in Tijuana, Mexico against Mexican fighter Mixia Medina and won the fight by decision. She is now (2-0).

=== Acting ===
Long has appeared in numerous movies, and was Michelle Pfeiffer's stunt double in Batman Returns.

== Personal life ==
Kathy Long currently lives in Seattle, Washington.

== Titles and honors ==
=== Hall of Fames ===
- Black Belt Hall of Fame (1991 Woman of the Year)
- Black Belt Hall of Fame (1992 Full Contact Fighter of the Year)
- Inside Kung Fu Hall of Fame (1992 Female of the Year)
- Bob Ellas Kern County Sports Hall of Fame (1996)

=== Titles ===
- 2x KICK World Kickboxing Champion
- 1x WKA World Kickboxing Champion
- 1x ISKA World Kickboxing Champion
- 1x WMAC World Kickboxing Champion

== Kickboxing record ==
Kickboxing and Muay Thai record (incomplete)
Kickboxing record 18 wins (6 KOs), 1 losses, 1 draws
Date	Result	Opponent	Event	Location	Method	Round	Time	Record
1992-03-16	Win	(Japan) Kyoko Miyasaki		Las Vegas, Nevada, USA	Decision (unanimous)	5	3:00	18-1-1
1991-08-24	Win	(Canada) Nora Daigle			Decision (Unanimous)	8	2:00	16-1-1
Won the WMAC World title.
1991-05-25	Win	(United States) Ramona Gatto		Laughlin, Nevada, USA	Points			
1990-08-06	Win	(United States) Denise Taylor		Lake Tahoe, Nevada, USA	Decision (Unanimous)	12	2:00	13-1-1
Won the KICK World Bantamweight title.
1990-02-03	Loss	(United Kingdom) Lisa Howarth	Muay Thai event	London, England	Points	3	3:00	12-1-1
1990-00-00	Win	(United States) Bonnie Canino		Las Vegas, Nevada, USA	Points	12	2:00	
Won the WKA Featherweight World title.
1989-00-00	Win	(France) Danielle Roccard			Points	9	2:00	
1989-00-00	Win	(United States) Denise Taylor		USA	Decision (Unanimous)	6	2:00	9-0-1
1989-09-13	Draw	(United States) Pixie Elmore		USA	Draw	7	2:00	8-0-1
Won the USA Kickboxing Bantamweight title.
Legend: Win Loss Draw/No contest Notes

== Mixed martial arts record ==
Professional record breakdown
2 matches	2 wins	0 losses
By decision	2	0

Res.	Record	Opponent	Method	Event	Date	Round	Time	Location	Notes
Win	2–0	(Mexico) Mixia Medina	Decision (unanimous)	Ascension Muay Thai and Kickboxing	August 22, 2015	3	3:00	Tijuana, Baja California, Mexico	
Win	1–0	(United States) Avery Vilche	Decision (unanimous)	Called Out MMA 1	August 15, 2009	3	3:00	Ontario, California, United States	

== Professional boxing record ==
3 fights	2 wins	1 loss
By decision	2	1

No.	Result	Record	Opponent	Type	Round, time	Date	Location	Notes
3	Win	2–1	(United States) Sandra Yard	SD	4	26 June 1998	(United States) Bally's Las Vegas, Paradise, Nevada, US	
2	Loss	1–1	(Sweden) Lena Åkesson	UD	4	31 March 1998	(United States) Casino Magic, Bay St. Louis, Mississippi, US	
1	Win	1–0	(United States) Sandra Yard	UD	4	10 March 1998	(United States) National Guard Armory, Pikesville, Maryland, US	

== Filmography ==
=== Films ===
- 2012 Santa's Summer House as Sadie
- 2012 Art of Submission as Herself
- 2011 River of Darkness as Amy Williams
- 2009 End Game as News Reporter
- 1997 Romy and Michele's High School Reunion as Kick Boxing Instructor
- 1995 Under the Gun as Lisa Krause
- 1995 The Stranger as "The Stranger"
- 1994 Natural Born Killers as Female deputy kicking Mickey (uncredited)
- 1993 Knights as Nea
- 1992 Rage and Honor as Fros-T

=== Television ===
Year	Title	Role	Notes	Ref.
1993	Street Justice	Lisa J. Hansen	Episode: "Desperate"	
1995	Walker, Texas Ranger	Officer Jane Cousins	Episode: "Deep Cover"	
2017	Martial Arts: Mind and Body	-	-	

=== Miscellaneous crews ===
Year	Title	Notes
1985	Summer's End	(Short) (production assistant)
1992	Batman Returns	(stunt double: Michelle Pfeiffer - uncredited) / (stunts)
1994	Natural Born Killers	(stunts - uncredited)
2015	Relentless Justice	(fight coordinator)
