= Daniele Bolelli =

Italian academic

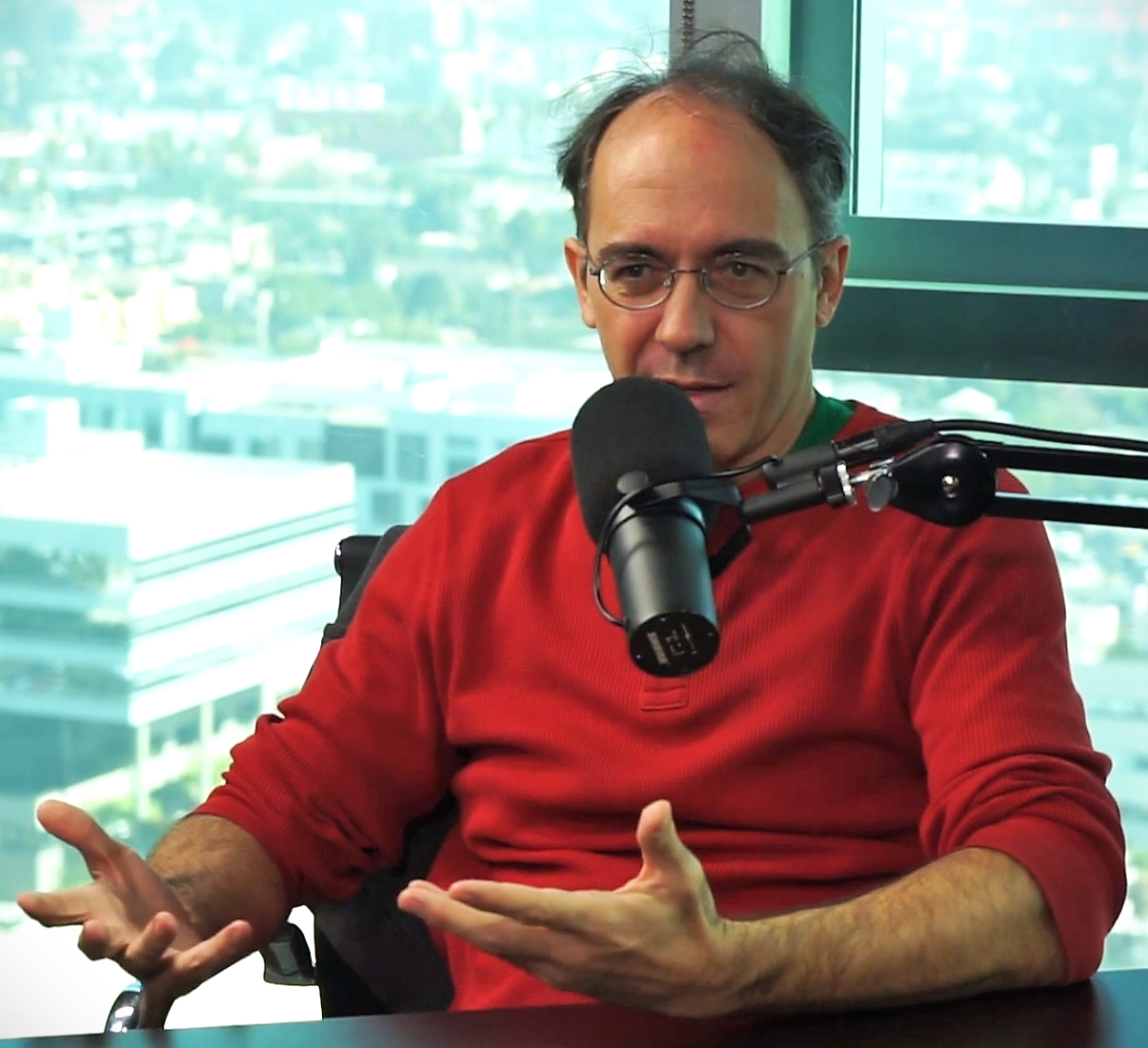
- Bolelli on The Art of Charm in 2019
- Born: January 11, 1974 (age 52); Milan, Italy
- Education: UCLA (B.A., Anthropology; M.A., American Indian Studies) CSULB (M.A., history) Cardiff University (unfinished doctorate, history)
- Occupations: Lecturer, writer, podcaster
- Children: 1
- Parent(s): Father: Franco Bolelli, Mother: Gloria Mattioni
- Website: danielebolelli.com

Daniele Bolelli (born January 11, 1974) is an Italian writer, university lecturer, martial artist, and podcaster based in Southern California. He is the author of several books on philosophy, and martial arts, including On the Warrior's Path. Known for his writing since the 1990s in Italy and the early 2000s in the United States, Bolelli rose to greater public prominence in the 2010s, beginning with his appearances on popular podcasts such as The Joe Rogan Experience. He went on to create his own podcasts, and has hosted The Drunken Taoist since 2012 and History on Fire since 2015.

Bolelli holds M.As in American Indian Studies and history from UCLA and California State University, Long Beach, and did postdoctoral research in history at Cardiff University. As a professor, he has taught a wide variety of courses in the arts, humanities, and social sciences on topics including Native American history and culture, Taoist philosophy, and Ancient Rome. He teaches at CSULB and Santa Monica College.

== Personal life ==
Bolelli was born in Milan, Italy, in a family of writers. His father, Franco Bolelli, was an Italian philosopher. His mother, Gloria Mattioni, is the author of four books and a freelance journalist. After high school, Bolelli moved to Los Angeles, where he began attending Santa Monica College. He later graduated from UCLA with a B.A. in Anthropology, and continued his graduate work at UCLA (in American Indian Studies), CSULB (History) and Cardiff University (History). He currently lives in the Los Angeles area. In 2011, Bolelli's wife, Elizabeth Han, died from a brain tumor a little over a year after giving birth to their daughter, Isabella.

== Writing ==
When he was 20 years old, Bolelli co-authored his first book Mitologie Felici, which was published in Italy. He later co-authored two more books in Italy Starship, and Frontiere. His first solo book, La Tenera Arte del Guerriero, was published when Bolelli was 22 years old. This work, which is a philosophical exploration of the martial arts, became popular in Italy even outside the confines of martial arts circles and it has been used as a textbook in several universities in the United States, Canada and Italy. Bolelli later translated it into English and added three additional chapters; the end result was published in the United States in 2003 under the title On the Warrior's Path. Two new chapters were later added for a second edition published in 2008. A Russian edition of On the Warrior's Path was published in 2011, and an updated Italian edition was released in 2013.

He next wrote a book on comparative religions, which was published in Italy in 2011 under the title iGod: Istruzioni per l'Uso di una Religione Fai da Te, and in the United States in 2013 as Create Your Own Religion: a how-to book without instructions.

Bolelli's third book, 50 Things You're Not Supposed To Know: Religion, was published in the United States in December 2011.

Bolelli's fourth book, Not Afraid: On Fear, Heartbreak, Raising a Baby Girl, and Cage Fighting was published in 2015. It's an autobiographical tale on the theme of facing fear which discusses Bolelli's experiences in martial arts, the death of his wife, and his raising his daughter as a single parent.

He says that the most influential thinkers to have affected his world view include Tom Robbins, Friedrich Nietzsche, Ikkyu Sojun, Thomas Paine, Henry David Thoreau, Lao Tzu, and Heraclitus.

== Teaching career ==
Bolelli teaches courses at CSULB and Santa Monica College. Unlike most scholars who tend to specialize in one particular field of knowledge, Bolelli describes himself as taking a "renaissance man approach." This has led him to lecture for diverse departments including History, Social Sciences, American Indian Studies, Asian American Studies, and World Arts and Cultures. The range of subjects he teaches include American Indian history and philosophy, history of the United States, world religions, history of ancient Rome, history and philosophy of martial arts, the ethnic experience in the United States, world history, and several courses on the relationship between cinema and history.

== Martial arts ==
Bolelli has trained in several styles of martial arts including kung fu san soo, taijiquan, baguazhang, xingyiquan, shuai jiao, submission wrestling, Brazilian jiujitsu, boxing, and judo. He holds black belts in Judo, Brazilian Jiujitsu, and an eight degree black belt in kung fu san soo – a style that he has taught for several years at UCLA's John Wooden Center. Bolelli also coached and fought professionally in mixed martial arts (MMA). His MMA role models are Genki Sudo, Evan Tanner, Rumina Sato and Kazushi Sakuraba. He also coaches and manages female MMA fighter Sovannahry Em. And teaches Brazilian jiu-jitsu and judo at Ojai Valley Martial Arts in Oak View, California. He is the author of two instructional videos for BJJ Fanatics called "Prison Rules: The Not-So Gentle Art of Jiu-Jitsu" and "Top Half Guard vs Bottom Half Guard"

== Media and podcasting ==
Bolelli is the host of two popular podcasts: The Drunken Taoist and History on Fire.

Bolelli began hosting The Drunken Taoist in October 2012 after appearing on popular podcasts including Adam Carolla's, Joe Rogan's, Duncan Trussell's and Skepticality, the official podcast of the Skeptic Society. His foray into podcasting followed his appearance in Spike TV's I Am Bruce Lee documentary and a Jan. 24, 2012 interview about his book 50 Things You’re Not Supposed to Know: Religion, published in Wired magazine. A little over a month after its debut, The Drunken Taoist was ranked number 1 in the world in the Philosophy section of iTunes. Bolelli explained the naming of the podcast in his interview with Taoism Network: Taoism forms the philosophical roots of his worldview. The 'drunken' part links to a type of consciousness that emphasises on instinct, a celebratory and egalitarian attitude, and his hero Ikkyu Sojun . In 2014, Bolelli released a sixteen-part lecture series about Taoist philosophy. He has continued to appear on various popular podcasts, including Mike Vallely's The Mike V Show.

Bolelli began hosting History On Fire in 2015, which was included in iTunes' list for 'Best of 2015' podcasts in the "Recent Debut" category. History on Fire was inspired by Dan Carlin's Hardcore History, and Carlin later appeared as a guest on the show. Topics of podcasts have included Oglala Lakota leader Crazy Horse, U.S. President Theodore Roosevelt, the Italian artist Caravaggio, and the early 20th Century American boxer Jack Johnson.
