= Bell Church =

- 钟教

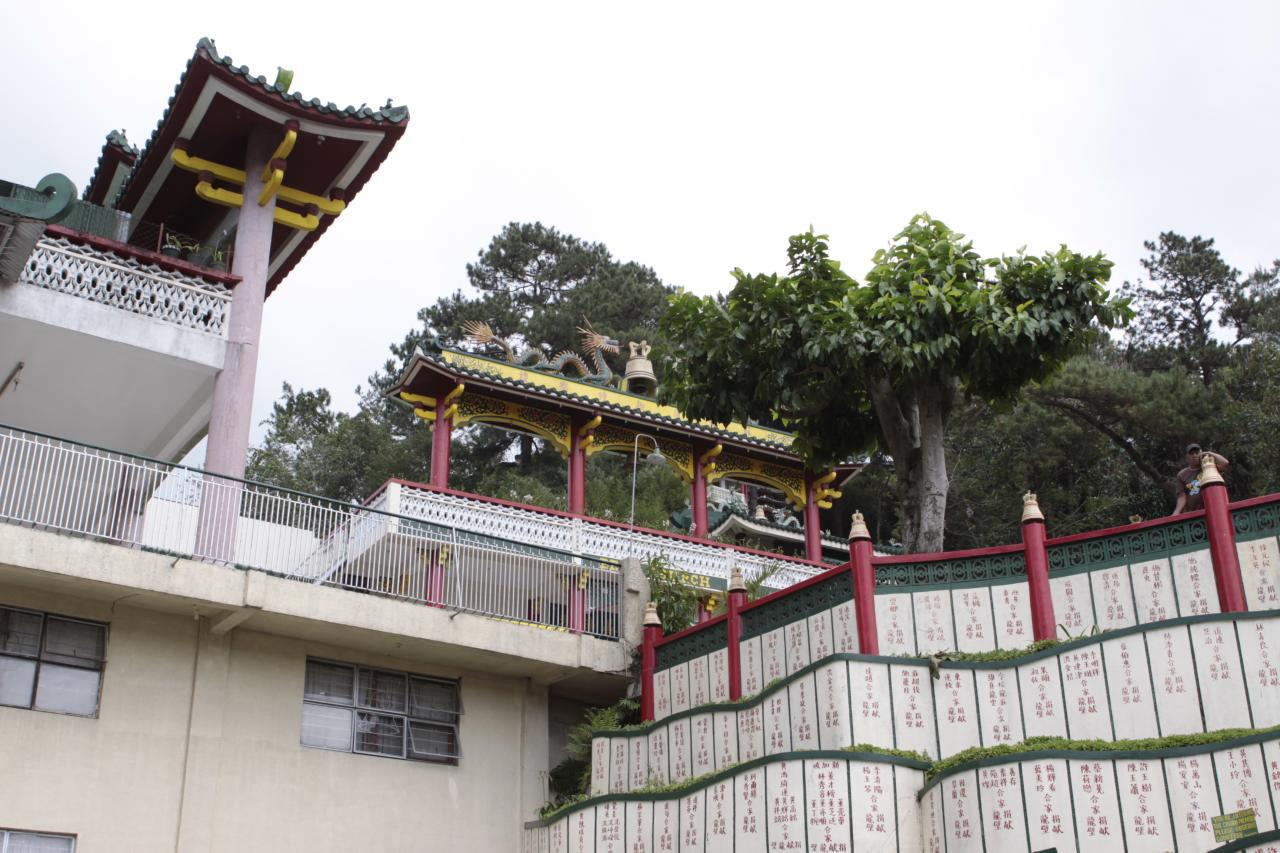
- Entrance to the La Trinidad temple.
- Formation: August 4, 1960; 66 years ago
- Founder: Ng Pee with other members
- Founded at: La Trinidad, Mountain Province, Philippines
- Purpose: Chinese cultural and spiritual organization
- Headquarters: Bell Church, La Trinidad, Benguet, Philippines
- Formerly called: Chinese Buddhist Temple

The Bell Church (simplified Chinese: 钟教; traditional Chinese: 鍾教; pinyin: Zhōngjiào; lit. 'Bell Religion') is a Chinese Filipino indigenous religious syncretistic organization based in La Trinidad, Benguet, Philippines. It was led Elias Ng, the Spiritual Leader and Head Administrator of the Bell Church.

== History ==
The Bell Church was founded on August 4, 1960, in Mountain Province (now Benguet) by a Chinese immigrants from Canton, China (now Guangzhou) led by Ng Pee. They were devotees of the Buddhist monk Ji Gong.

In 1954, he first preached in a dining hall of a restaurant but eventually transferred the place of worship to his residence along the Kilometer 6 mark in La Trinidad, due to increasing number of devotees. Then known as the "Chinese Buddhist Temple", the temple's membership is composed of primarily ethnic Chinese farmers. Membership continued to grow and the temple had to be moved again to its present site along the Kilometer 3 mark in the 1960s and has since then become known as the "Bell Church". With support from the local Chinese community, the house in the current site was converted to a temple.

== Belief ==
The Bell Church considers itself as a religion with ecumenical and interfaith in orientation.

=== Patron saints ===
The Bell Church has five patron saints which represents the religions of Taoism, Buddhism, Christianity, Islam, and Confucianism. Its members pray to these saints. According to the group the patron saints are an acknowledgement that the Bell Church temples are open to prayers made by anyone. These faiths are major religions in China.

=== Philosophy and practice ===
The philosophy of the group revolves around the bell which it says represents unity. The group believes that religions are "only differences in beliefs" and advocates people regardless of religion to live in harmony by disregarding these differences.

One of the basic principles of the Bell Church is the law of karma and members and devotees are urged to "live morally upright, always help others in need, attend Mass, practice other virtues" which is said to bring good karma.

== Chapters ==
The Bell Church organization designated its temple in Benguet as its headquarters. It later established other temples or chapters in other parts of the Philippines and abroad. They maintain chapters in Cagayan de Oro, Dagupan, La Loma (Quezon City), Manila, Dumaguete, Davao City, Cotabato City, and Zamboanga City. They also have a chapter in Hong Kong and San Francisco, United States. These chapters are all referred as "Bell Church".
