= Carrie Yau =

Hong Kong government official

This is a Hong Kong name; Tsang is the maiden name and Yau is the married name.

Carrie Yau Tsang Kar-lai GBS JP (Chinese: 尤曾家麗; née Tsang; born 4 June 1955) is a former Hong Kong government official.

She was graduated from the University of Hong Kong and Somerville College, Oxford and joined the Hong Kong government as an Administrative Officer in 1977. She worked in major policies including security, building and lands, education and manpower, transport, health and food safety in bureaux and departments such as the former Environment Branch, the former Finance Branch, the former New Territories Administration, the former Civil Service Branch, the former City and New Territories Administration, the former Building and Lands Department, the former Security Branch, the former Education and Manpower Branch, the former Transport Branch and the former Chief Secretary's Office.

From 1995 to 1997, she was Deputy Secretary for Security. In 1997 she was appointed Director of Administration and in 2000. She was Permanent Secretary for Health, Welfare and Food from 2002 to 2007, Permanent Secretary for Home Affairs from 2007 to 2010. She handled crisis management issues relating to Vietnamese boat people, SARS, avian flu; and coordination of international events like 2000 ITU Telecom Asia and 2008 Olympic Equestrian Events. In April 2010, Yau retired from the civil service after almost 33 years of service. In 2013, she was appointed Executive Director of the Vocational Training Council.
