= Hunter von Leer =

American actor (1944– )

- Born: Paul Hunter von Leer; April 3, 1944 (age 82); Terre Haute, Indiana, U.S.
- Occupation: Actor
- Years active: 1971–2003

Hunter von Leer (born in Terre Haute, Indiana; April 3, 1944) is an American former actor who has appeared in films, television series, and television movies. Von Leer is a 1968 graduate of Indiana State University. After graduation, von Leer moved to California, teaching high school there for a year while he tried to break into acting as a stunt man.

His last film or television credit was the 2003 TV movie Book of Days. Von Leer's acting career ended due to unspecified medical issues. After leaving acting, he moved back to Indiana and became a cattle farmer in Lawrence County.

Von Leer is married to wife Fariba who "has a large insurance agency in California."

== Filmography ==
=== Film ===
Year	Title	Role	Notes
1971	Thief		TV movie
1972	Trapped Beneath the Sea		
1972	Unholy Rollers	Larry	
1973	A Brand New Life		TV movie
1973	Cahill U.S. Marshal	Deputy Sheriff Jim Kane	
1973	The Stone Killer	Graham	
1973	Executive Action	Rifleman - Team B	
1975	Framed	Dewey	
1975	The Kansas City Massacre		
1975	Promise Him Anything		TV movie
1975	Sky Heist		TV movie
1976	The Missouri Breaks	Sandy Chase	
1976	Midway	'Strawberry 9' Navigator	Uncredited
1976	Richie Brockelman: The Missing 24 Hours		TV movie
1977	Black Sunday	T.V. Cameraman	
1977	Deadly Game		TV movie
1977	The Girl in the Empty Grave		TV movie
1977	High Anxiety	Policeman at Airport #2	
1977	Panic in Echo Park		TV movie
1978	Loose Change		
1978	Mean Dog Blues	Guard at Conjugal Barracks	
1979	Steel	Surfer	
1981	History of the World: Part I	Lt. Bob - The Roman Empire	
1981	Halloween II	Deputy Gary Hunt	
1981	The Violation of Sarah McDavid		TV Movie
1982	The Day the Bubble Burst		TV Movie
1983	Making of a Male Model		TV movie
1986	The Return of Mickey Spillane's Mike Hammer		TV movie
1987	Talkings Walls	James	
1988	Big Business	Petey	
1989	Under the Boardwalk	Midos	
1992	Into the Sun	Lt. Col. Reynolds	
1992	Trancers III	Sen. McCoy	Direct-to-video
1995	The Stranger	Mayor Carl Perkins	
2002	The Round and Round	M.B.	
2002	Cockfight		
2003	Book of Days		TV movie

=== Television ===
Year	Title	Role	Notes
1971	Night Gallery		
1972	Cade's County		
1973–1974	Cannon		
1974–1975	Kolchak: The Night Stalker		
1974–1976	McCloud		
1977	General Hospital	Larry Baker	minor character
1977	The Hardy Boys/Nancy Drew Mysteries		
1977–1978	The Rockford Files		
1978	Charlie's Angels		
1979	Dukes of Hazzard		
1979	240-Robert		
1980	The Stockard Channing Show		
1982	CHiPs		
1983	Hotel		
1983	Seven Brides for Seven Brothers		
1984	Magnum, P.I.		
1984	Trapper John, M.D.		
1984	The Master		
1986–1987	Dallas	B. D. Calhoun	minor recurring character
1988	Houston Knights		
1989	Guns of Paradise		
1991	Quantum Leap		
1992	In the Heat of the Night		
1999	The West Wing		
