= San Soo =

Chinese-American martial art

San Soo 散手
- Also known as: San Soo, Tsoi Li Ho Fut Hung
- Focus: Hybrid martial arts
- Country of origin: China (Republican Era), United States
- Creator: Jimmy H. Woo
- Famous practitioners: Benjamin Brandt, Kathy Long, Gerald Okamura, Ralph Johnson, Daniele Bolelli
- Ancestor arts: Hung Gar, Li Gar, Fut Gar

Kung Fu San Soo (功夫散手) is a Chinese-American martial art. It is based on techniques from all over China, both Northern and Southern Chinese martial arts systems.

== Etymology ==
The specific or proper name of this art is Tsoi Li Ho Fut Hung (蔡李何佛雄) and/or 5 Family Fist (五家拳). The name "Kung Fu San Soo" itself was chosen by the style’s creator, Jimmy H. Woo, to simplify the pronunciation and meaning for American students, rather than using the complete names of the 5 families.

San Soo (散手) can mean both "unbounded hand" or "free hand". It bears a similar name with Chinese martial art Sanda (also called Sanshou), which is a different style from San Soo.

== History ==
Kung Fu San Soo has heritage to the martial arts devised by the monks of the Kwan Yin Temple. These techniques were developed by the monks to defend themselves from the bandits while on pilgrimage. The style began truly forming itself from the 5 Family Fist (五家拳), commonly practiced in the Taishan region of the Guangdong province.

In China, many centuries ago, there were three original families that contributed information from their systems in order to create this art. They built a monastery and developed a combined defense system. These families are Tsoi, Li, and Ho. Fut was the philosophical or religious base and originally made reference to Buddha. The Hung family was added later in order to increase power, physical conditioning and dynamics.

Style founder Jimmy Woo had learned the techniques, that he would use to create San Soo, from his great-uncle, Chin Sue-Hung. Jimmy Woo, who learnt the style and illegally emigrated to United States in 1937, would establish his first San Soo school in 1962, at Chinatown, Los Angeles, California.

== Foundation and techniques ==
Kung Fu San Soo originated for use in military combat and uses techniques designed to swiftly disable an attacker. Due to the fact, San Soo is a practical martial art for self-defense and the techniques are intended for real fight scenarios, there are no competitions or tournaments for San Soo Kung Fu. While San Soo was not created or taught as a tournament sport, practitioners commonly incorporate forms of limited sparring.

Kung Fu San Soo has no patterns (kata, taolu etc.), making it adaptable style. Its been founded on the knowledge of physics, with there being an emphasis on leverage, power and speed. When fighting, the practitioner is to assume the mentality that they must either incapacitate the opponent within three strikes or to end the fight in less than 10 seconds.

Kung Fu San Soo does not attempt to emulate the motions of animals with elaborate forms. His words were, "We fight like men, not animals."

The basic premise of San Soo is there are no rules in a fight, so the style is techniques oriented to remove a threat as quickly as possible through seizing the initiative and keeping the opponent off balance. Like many martial arts, San Soo can be used by smaller or weaker persons against larger or stronger assailants by utilizing technique and knowledge of reaction to make up for a lack of strength.

Techniques in San Soo are made up of Chin Na leverages, throwing, choking, joint-locking, strangling, strikes, and quick takedowns. Targets include the eyes, nose, throat, base of the skull, neck, liver, spleen, kidneys, testicles, and knees, and for this reason, most San Soo practitioners do not engage in full contact competition/sport fighting. Techniques are commonly practiced in unrehearsed 'freestyle workout' sessions with carefully controlled contact. San Soo practitioners claim this method of training builds an automatic and flexible response in much the same way we learn language a few words at a time until we have full and versatile vocabularies. Training methods, historic interpretations, and modifications exist from school to school among the modern descendants of San Soo.

San Soo also incorporates training with the use of many traditional Chinese weapons. These include the staff (5', 7' and 9'), broadsword, hooking or ripping swords, baat cham do (butterfly swords), three-section staff, taijijian (tai chi sword), knife, spear, kwon do, chas and chain. The baton, although not a traditional Chinese weapon, was a weapon that Jimmy Woo specialized in and incorporated into the art.

== Notable practitioners ==
=== Jimmy H. Woo (founder of American Kung Fu San Soo) ===
Kung Fu San Soo was brought to United States by Chin Siu Dek. (Note: Chan Siu Duk, or Chen Shou Jue (陳壽爵, Chen2 Shou4 Jue2), depending on the dialect.) Kung Fu San Soo tradition holds that Chin Siu Dek lived and grew up just across the river from this school in the village of Sanba. Chin learned Five Family Style / Tsoi Li Ho Fut Hung primarily from his Great-Uncle, Chan Siu Hung at the Hung Sing Goon school in Taishan, Guangdong Province, China. The Hung Sing Goon school would end up being destroyed by communist partisans during the Cultural Revolution.

Chin would enter United States under the Chinese Exclusion Act, and leaving China on the eve of the Japanese Occupation, Chin Siu Dek took the name, "Jimmy Haw Woo" as a lifetime pseudonym.

According to sources, he was born around 1910–14. Jimmy H. Woo died in Southern California on February 14, 1991.

=== Kathy Long ===
Kathy Long is 5-time World Champion Kickboxer and holds an 8th degree black belt/sash in Kung Fu San Soo.

=== Gerald Okamura ===
Gerald Okamura is a Hollywood Actor and Stuntman.

=== Ralph Johnson ===
Ralph Johnson is the drummer for Earth, Wind & Fire.

=== Daniele Bolelli ===
Daniele Bolelli is author of multiple books and creator of the History on Fire podcast. He holds an 8th Degree Black Belt in Kung Fu San Soo.

== See also ==
- Jeet Kune Do
- Choy Li Fut
- Vovinam
- Nanquan (martial art)
- Kajukenbo
