= Yung Yau =

Yung Yau (邱勇) is currently the Associate Dean of the School of Graduate Studies and Professor of the School of Graduate Studies and Department of Sociology and Social Policy, Lingnan University. Before joining Lingnan University, he was the Associate Professor of Housing Studies in the Department of Public Policy, City University of Hong Kong.

He obtained his bachelor degree in surveying and PhD degree from the Department of Real Estate and Construction, the University of Hong Kong. His PhD supervisors were Prof. Daniel Chi-wing Ho and Prof. Kwong-wing Chau. His PhD research is about assessment of building safety performance of private multi-storey residential buildings in Hong Kong.

Yau has won the following awards:

- American Society of Civil Engineers 2016 Outstanding Reviewer Award;
- Emerald 2016 Literati Award;
- American Society of Civil Engineers 2015 Outstanding Reviewer Award;
- American Society of Civil Engineers 2014 Outstanding Reviewer Award;
- Best Conference Paper Award in the Pacific Rim Real Estate Society Conference 2013;
- Li Ka Shing Prize 2007; and
- Hong Kong Institute of Architects Annual Awards 2006 (Architectural Research).
