= Thomas Tam =

Hong Kong-born Canadian businessman

- Born: Hong Kong, China
- Occupation: Businessperson
- Known for: Former CEO of the Asian-Canadian immigration services organization

Thomas Tam is a Hong Kong-born Canadian businessman. He is a former CEO of the Asian-Canadian immigration services organization S.U.C.C.E.S.S. (United Chinese Community Enrichment Services Society). He was replaced by Queenie Choo in 2012.

== Career ==
He was born in Hong Kong and immigrated to Vancouver, Canada in 1992. Before immigrating to Canada, he was a lecturer at Hong Kong Baptist University, working in the Department of Social Work and was a social worker working with the Stewards' Social Services in Hong Kong. He held the position as CEO of the Asian-Canadian immigration services organization S.U.C.C.E.S.S. and was replaced by Queenie Choo in 2012. He succeeded Tung Chan in 2010. He has been with this organization since 1992. Taking the helm of the organization, the organization had over 77 employees and grew it to over 400.

He resigned from the organization in June 2012 after spending two decades there.

Thomas Tam was appointed to the Vancouver Police Board on Jan. 16, 2014. The Vancouver Police Board is the employer and governing body of the Vancouver Police Department. It provides civilian governance and oversight of policing. Under British Columbia’s Police Act, the Board consists of the Mayor as Chair; one person appointed by the municipal council; and up to seven people appointed by the Lieutenant Governor in Council.
