= Yau Lop Poon =

L. P. Yau (Yau Lop Poon邱立本, aka Qiu liben, born in Hong Kong in 1950) is a veteran journalist, who worked in Taiwan, the United States and Hong Kong for the last 40 years, and was selected by the netizens in China as one of the Top 100 Public Intellectuals in 2006 and 2008. Yau was awarded the Distinguished Journalist in Hong Kong by the Xinyun Journalism Award in 2010 in Taiwan. And he also got the SOPA's Best News Commentary Award in 2011.

He is currently the editor-in-chief of Yazhou Zhoukan (亞洲周刊, Asia Weekly), headquartered in Hong Kong. It is a newsmagazine founded by Time-Warner in 1987, and later sold to the Mingpao Group, that aims to the Chinese community around the world. He joined the magazine in 1990 as the senior writer and was assigned as Chief Editor since 1993. He led the weekly to build a Greater China audience, calling for a universal style of written Chinese that bridged the language gap between mainland China, Taiwan, and the Southeast Asia. The weekly received a number of journalism honors, including the SOPA awards. Between 1995 and 1997, he worked for 15 months as the Editor-in-Chief for the Mingpao Monthly (明報月刊), making him the Chief Editor for two mainstream magazines at the same time.

== Career ==
Raised in Hong Kong, Yau studied in St. Thomas Primary School, Bishop Hall Jubilee School and Lee Kau Yan Memorial School—all are Anglican missionary schools in Hong Kong. He went to study in the National Chengchi University (國立政治大學) in Taipei in 1967 and majored in economics. In 1971, he worked as the executive editor in The Intellectual (大學雜誌), the magazine that called for political reform, putting an end of the authoritarian rule in Taiwan. The magazine was organized by a group of reform-minded professors who was perceived as the allies of the rising power of Chiang Jin-kuo (蔣經國), the son and heir apparent of Chiang Kai-shek (蔣介石). Yau was under the leadership of the chief editor Yang Kuo-hsu (楊國樞), the then psychology professor of the National Taiwan University.

Yau also co-found a cinema magazine, The Sight and Sound (影響雜誌), in Taiwan. He was the one that wrote the "Editor's Word" in the first issue. He joined the China Times (中國時報) in 1972 as an editor-translator for the international news. He was one of the members in the team that translated the text of the US-North Vietnam Peace Accords in 1973, from English into Chinese.

He went to the United States to further his study in 1973. He also worked as reporter and editor in a number of Chinese-language newspapers in New York and California. He got a master's degree in liberal studies, majoring in economics, from the New School for Social Research in New York in 1978. He worked as a researcher in the University of California, Berkeley, in 1979, focusing on the history of Chinese Americans.

He was the editor in the China Times (U.S edition) in 1980 and later became the editorial writer and deputy chief editor in the Centre Daily News. He also did a one-year stint as a high school teacher in the Norman Thomas High School in Manhattan, New York City, shortly before he came back to Hong Kong to work in the Yazhou Zhoukan (Asia Weekly) in the Summer of 1990.

Yau was a part-time professor of journalism in the University of Hong Kong, teaching news coverage and news commentary. He serves as mentor in HKU for a number of projects for both undergraduates and graduate students.

== Books ==
Yau has published a few Chinese books since 2008, including:

- Yau L.P. (2008), Notebook on the Journalistic Passion (Jiqing Xinwen Biji,激情新聞筆記), Hong Kong: Cosmos
- Yau L.P. (2008), Literature in a Hurry (Congmang De Wenxue,匆忙的文學), Taipei:Ink Publishing
- Yau L.P. (2008), Tomorrow Declines Yellow Flower (Mingri Buzai Huanghua,明日不再黃花), Hong Kong:Cosmos
- Yau L.P. (2010), The World Explorer (Wenzi Maoxian Jia,文字冒險家), Hong Kong:Cosmos
- Yau L.P. (2011), As My Tongue Remembers (Shetou De Jiyi,舌頭的記憶), Taipei:Er Yu Wen Hua
- Yau L.P. (2011), The Rising Youth Power (Jueqi De Qingchun Quanli,崛起的青春權力), Hong Kong:Cosmos
