= Franco Bolelli =

Italian philosopher (1950–2020)

Franco Bolelli (July 8, 1950 – October 5, 2020) was an Italian philosopher. His philosophical influences included Nietzsche and Taoism.

== Biography ==
He was born and lived in Milan. A philosopher and essayist, he was the author of numerous books, including "Con gli occhi della tigre" (With the Eyes of the Tiger) (for a vital, epic, erotic, sentimental philosophy), "Per tutti i per sempre" (For All Forever) (Amazon, 2019), "+Donna +Uomo" (Tlon, 2017), and "Tutta la verità sull'Amore" (The Whole Truth about Love) (Sperling&Kupfer, 2015), all three written with Manuela Mantegazza. He also wrote "Si fa così" (This is How it's Done) (Turin, Add, 2013), "Giocate!" (Play!) (Turin, Add, 2012), and "Viva Tutto!" (Live Everything!) together with Lorenzo Cherubini, also known as Jovanotti (Turin, Add, 2010). He designed and staged dozens of events and festivals, including "Il Festival dell'Amore" (The Festival of Love), "Frontiere" (Borders), "Living Simplicity," and "Mi030" with Stefano Boeri.

In 2020, he wrote the introduction to the book "Covid-19 L'inizio di una nuova era" (Covid-19: The Beginning of a New Era) by Fausto D'Agostino and Mario Pappagallo.

He was an editor for Gong, wrote for the first historic edition of Alfabeta, founded Musica 80, and curated the catalogs of Brian Eno's installations in Milan.

He was a part-time lecturer at the Polytechnic University of Milan.

=== Personal life ===
He was married to Manuela Mantegazza and was the father of one child.

== Books ==
- Tutta la Verita' sull'Amore, with Manuela Mantegazza (Sperling & Kupfer, 2015)
- Si Fa Così (ADD, 2013)
- Giocate! (ADD, 2012)
- Viva Tutto! with Lorenzo Jovanotti Cherubini (ADD, 2010)
- Cartesio non balla, Garzanti, 2007, ISBN 978-88-11-74068-1
- Con il cuore e con le palle, Garzanti, 2005, ISBN 88-11-74052-5
- Più mondi, BCD editore, 2002, ISBN 88-8490-133-2
- Live Castelvecchi, 1997, ISBN 88-8210-043-X
- Vota te stesso, Castelvecchi, 1996, ISBN 88-86232-57-8
- Come Ibra, Kobe, Bruce Lee, Bolelli, F. ISBN 978-88-6783-189-0
