= Feilai Temple =

Feilai Temple (simplified Chinese: 飞来寺; traditional Chinese: 飛來寺; pinyin: Feīlaísì) may refer to:

- Feilai Temple (Qingyuan), built during the Liang dynasty (502–587 CE) in Qingyuan, Guangdong, China.
- Feilai Temple (Deqin County), built during the Ming dynasty (1368–1662 CE) in Deqin County, Yunnan, China.
