= Observation deck =

Elevated sightseeing platform

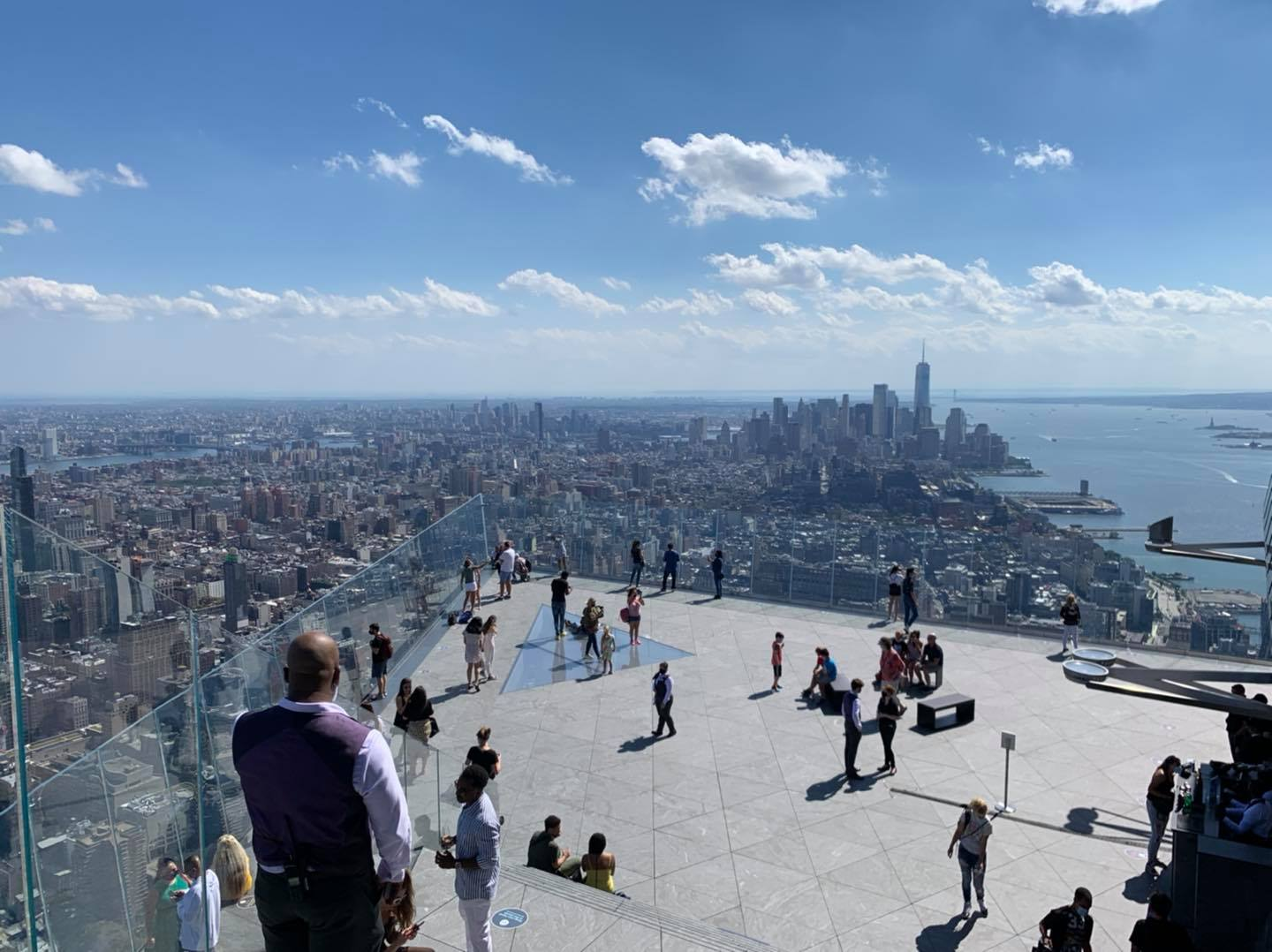
The Edge at 30 Hudson Yards in Midtown Manhattan, containing optically transparent flooring, looking toward Lower Manhattan, opened in 2020

An observation deck, observation platform, or viewing platform is an elevated sightseeing platform usually situated upon a tall architectural structure, such as a skyscraper or observation tower. Observation decks are sometimes enclosed from weather, and a few may include coin-operated telescopes for viewing distant features.

== List of public observation decks ==
List of public observation decks
Rank	Name	Completion Year	Type	City	Deck height (m)	Total height (m)	Notes
1	Burj Khalifa	2010	Skyscraper	(United Arab Emirates) Dubai	585	829.8	Floors 152-154 (opened 2019). Additional decks on floor 148 (555m, opened 2014, which was the world's highest observation deck at its opening) and floors 124-125 (452m).
2	Shanghai Tower	2015	Skyscraper	(China) Shanghai	562	632	121st floor; decks are also on 118th and 119th floors.
3	Ping An Finance Centre	2017	Skyscraper	(China) Shenzhen	562	599.1	115th floor (opened on February 10, 2018).
4	Merdeka 118	2022	Skyscraper	(Malaysia) Kuala Lumpur	510	678.9	
5	Canton Tower	2010	Steel tower	(China) Guangzhou	488	604	
6	Lotte World Tower	2017	Skyscraper	(South Korea) Seoul	486	555	
6	Abraj Al Bait	2011	Skyscraper	(Saudi Arabia) Mecca	486	601	
8	Shanghai World Financial Center	2008	Skyscraper	(China) Shanghai	474	492.3	100th floor, decks also on levels 94 & 97. Deck permanently closed in 2023.
9	Tokyo Skytree	2012	Steel tower	(Japan) Tokyo	451.2	634	Three additional observation decks at 340m, 345m, and 350m.
10	Taipei 101	2004	Skyscraper	(Taiwan) Taipei	449.2	508.2	The 101st floor indoor/outdoor rooftop observation deck opened to the public on June 14, 2019. Two additional observation decks, outdoor on the 91st-floor and indoor on the 89th floor at 383.2 metres (1,257 ft)..
11	CN Tower	1976	Concrete tower	(Canada) Toronto	446.7	553.3	Two additional observation decks at 342 m (outdoor) & 346 m (indoor).
12	Willis Tower	1974	Skyscraper	(United States) Chicago	412.7	527.3	103rd floor; it is the highest observation deck (skydeck) and highest skywalk (skydeck glass balconies) in the United States
13	Sky100, International Commerce Centre	2011	Skyscraper	(China) Hong Kong	393	484	100th floor; 360-degree indoor observation deck.
14	One World Trade Center	2014	Skyscraper	(United States) New York City	386.6	541.3	Observation deck on the 100th, 101st and 102nd floors.
15	Landmark 81	2019	Skyscraper	(Vietnam) Ho Chi Minh City	382	461	Observation decks on 79th, 80th and 81st floors.
16	Autograph Tower	2025	Skyscraper	(Indonesia) Jakarta	382.9	382.9	Observation deck on 99th floor, it has the world’s highest outdoor pool and the highest skydeck in Southern Hemisphere.
17	Petronas Towers	1998	Skyscraper	(Malaysia) Kuala Lumpur	370	451.9	Observation deck on 86th floor of tower 2; in addition there is the skybridge between the two towers on 41st and 42nd floors at 170 m.
18	Empire State Building	1931	Skyscraper	(United States) New York City	369	448.7	102nd floor; additional 86th floor deck (320 m).
19	Iconic Tower	2023	Skyscraper	(Egypt) New Administrative Capital	360	394	Observations on 74th, 75th and 76th floors.
20	Lakhta Center	2021	Skyscraper	(Russia) Saint Petersburg	357	462	Observations on 84th, 85th 86th and 87th floors.
21	Ciel Tower	2025	Skyscraper	(United Arab Emirates) Dubai	355	377	Observation deck on 82rd floors, 76th floor (315 m)
22	Oriental Pearl Tower	1994	Concrete tower	(China) Shanghai	351	467.9	15 observation levels, the highest one being outdoors
23	The Strat	1996	Concrete Tower	(United States) Paradise	350	350.2	Tallest observation tower in the U.S.
24	Tuntex Sky Tower	1997	Skyscraper	(Taiwan) Kaohsiung	341	347.5	74th floor.
25	Jin Mao Tower	1998	Skyscraper	(China) Shanghai	340.1	420.5	88th floor.
25	30 Hudson Yards	2020	Skyscraper	(United States) New York City	340	387	Observation decks on 100th and 101st floors.
25	Ostankino Tower	1967	Concrete tower	(Russia) Moscow	340	540.1	Indoor deck is at 337 m.
27	John Hancock Center	1969	Skyscraper	(United States) Chicago	313.8	343.5	94th floor.
28	Milad Tower	2007	Concrete tower	(Iran) Tehran	312	435	Top level.
29	China World Trade Center Tower III	2010	Skyscraper	(China) Beijing	311.8	330	81st floor.
30	One Vanderbilt	2021	Skyscraper	(United States) New York City	310	427	Observations on 62nd and 63rd floors.
31	Shun Hing Square	1996	Skyscraper	(China) Shenzhen	298.1	384	
32	US Bank Tower	1989	Skyscraper	(United States) Los Angeles	297	310	69th (indoor and outdoor observation) and 70th floors (skyslide and events) CLOSED.
33	Kingdom Centre	2002	Skyscraper	(Saudi Arabia) Riyadh	290	302	41st floor.
34	Abeno Harukas	2014	Skyscraper	(Japan) Osaka	288	300	58th–60th floor (top floor).
35	Zifeng Tower	2010	Skyscraper	(China) Nanjing	287	450	
36	Eureka Tower	2007	Skyscraper	(Australia) Melbourne	285	297.3	Skydeck 88 is at a height of 285 m.
37	King Power MahaNakhon	2018	Skyscraper	(Thailand) Bangkok	281.6	314	Observation deck on 74th, 76th, and 78th floors.
37	Etihad Towers (Tower 2)	2011	Skyscraper	(United Arab Emirates) Abu Dhabi	281.6	305.3	Observation deck at 300 is located on 75th floor.
39	Eiffel Tower	1889	Wrought iron lattice tower	(France) Paris	276.1	330	3rd floor.
40	Menara Kuala Lumpur	1996	Concrete tower	(Malaysia) Kuala Lumpur	276	421	
41	Columbia Center	1985	Skyscraper	(United States) Seattle	275	284	73rd floor.
42	Yokohama Landmark	1993	Skyscraper	(Japan) Yokohama	273	296	69th floor.
43	One Liberty Place	1987	Skyscraper	(United States) Philadelphia	269	288	57th floor.
44	Bank of America Plaza (Dallas)	1985	Skyscraper	(United States) Dallas	268.4	281	71st floor; additional on 70th floor at 264.6 metres (868 ft).
45	JPMorgan Chase Tower	1982	Skyscraper	(United States) Houston	268.2	305.4	60th floor.
46	Sydney Tower	1981	Steel Tower	(Australia) Sydney	268	309	Main indoor observation deck; outdoor skywalk attraction on roof is located at 279 meters.
47	Gran Torre Santiago	2013	Skyscraper	(Chile) Santiago	261	300	Observation deck named Sky Costanera is located on floors 61 and 62.
48	GE Building	1933	Skyscraper	(United States) New York City	259.1	259.1	70th floor ("Top of the Rock").
49	Tianjin Tower	1991	Concrete tower	(China) Tianjin	257	415.2	
50	40 Wall Street	1929	Skyscraper	(United States) New York City	255	283	
51	22 Bishopsgate	2020	Skyscraper	(United Kingdom) London	254	278	Tallest free observation deck in Europe on the 58th floor.
52	Osaka Prefectural Government Sakishima Building	1995	Skyscraper	(Japan) Osaka	252	256	
53	Etihad Towers (Tower 1)	2011	Skyscraper	(United Arab Emirates) Abu Dhabi	251.2	277.6	
54	63 Building	1985	Skyscraper	(South Korea) Seoul	249	250	60th floor.
55	Midland Square	2007	Skyscraper	(Japan) Nagoya	247	247	47th floor.
56	Lotus Tower	2019	Concrete tower	(Sri Lanka) Colombo	245	356	
57	The Shard	2013	Skyscraper	(United Kingdom) London	244.8	306	72nd floor.
58	Central Radio & TV Tower	1992	Concrete tower	(China) Beijing	238	405	
59	Sunshine 60	1978	Skyscraper	(Japan) Tokyo	237.6	239.8	
60	Federation Tower (Tower West)	2008	Skyscraper	(Russia) Moscow	235	252	62nd floor.
61	TK Elevator Test Tower	2017	Concrete tower	(Germany) Rottweil	232	246	30th floor (indoor and outdoor).
62	Q1	2005	Skyscraper	(Australia) Gold Coast	230	323	77th floor (SkyPoint), with the function hall on the 78th.
62	West Pearl Tower	2006	Concrete tower	(China) Chengdu	230	339	
62	Varso Tower	2023	Skyscraper	(Poland) Warsaw	230	310	50th and 53rd floor.
65	Shibuya Scramble Square	2019	Skyscraper	(Japan) Tokyo	229.7	229.7	"SHIBUYA SKY" roof-deck on the top of the building.
66	Roppongi Hills Mori Tower	2003	Skyscraper	(Japan) Tokyo	229.3	238	52nd floor (indoor) and 54th floor (roof-deck).
67	Taipei Nan Shan Plaza	2018	Skyscraper	(Taiwan) Taipei	228.5	272	46th floor (indoor).
68	Europaturm	1979	Concrete tower	(Germany) Frankfurt	227	337.5	Since 1999, the Europaturm has been closed to the public.
69	Tokyo Tower	1958	Steel truss tower	(Japan) Tokyo	223.5	332.6	6th floor.
70	Macau Tower	2001	Concrete tower	(China) Macau	223	338	
71	Sky Tower	1997	Concrete tower	(New Zealand) Auckland	220	328	Skydeck observation deck on 60th floor.
72	Tour Montparnasse	1972	Skyscraper	(France) Paris	209	209	
73	Fernsehturm Berlin	1969	Concrete tower	(Germany) Berlin	207	368	
74	Tokyo Metropolitan Government Building	1990	Skyscraper	(Japan) Tokyo	202	243.4	
75	Main Tower	1999	Skyscraper	(Germany) Frankfurt	200	240	
75	Sky Tower	2012	Skyscraper	(Poland) Wrocław	200	212	Indoor observation deck located on 49th Floor.
75	Marina Bay Sands	2010	Skyscraper	Singapore	200	200	
75	Alto das Nações	2026	Skyscraper	(Brazil) São Paulo	200	219	
79	Olympiaturm	1968	Concrete tower	(Germany) Munich	192	291	
80	Mohammed VI Tower	2023	Skyscraper	(Morocco) Salé	190	250	Observation deck on 54th and 55th floor.
81	Vysotsky	2011	Skyscraper	(Russia) Yekaterinburg	186	188.3	Observation deck was opened on 3 May 2012.
82	Bitexco Financial Tower	2010	Skyscraper	(Vietnam) Ho Chi Minh City	181	262.5	47th floor.
83	Tower of the Americas	1968	Concrete tower	(United States) San Antonio	176	229	
84	Rheinturm	1979	Concrete tower	(Germany) Düsseldorf	170	240.5	
84	Umeda Sky Building	1993	Skyscraper	(Japan) Osaka	170	173	
84	Tallinn TV Tower	1980	Tower	(Estonia) Tallinn	170	314	
88	Donauturm	1964	Concrete tower	(Austria) Vienna	169.4	252	
89	Torre Latinoamericana	1956	Skyscraper	Mexico City	166	188	
90	N Seoul Tower	1975	Steel tower	(South Korea) Seoul	168.3	236.7	Tower sits atop Namsan Mountain.
91	Vilnius TV Tower	1980	Tower	(Lithuania) Vilnius	165	326.5	
92	Azabudai Hills Mori JP Tower	2024	Skyscraper	(Japan) Tokyo	160	325	Observation deck on 33th and 34th floor.
93	Space Needle	1962	Steel tower	(United States) Seattle	158.5	184.4	
94	Edifício Itália	1966	Skyscraper	(Brazil) São Paulo	158	165	41th floor
95	Calgary Tower	1968	Concrete tower	(Canada) Calgary	157.5	190.8	
96	Fernsehturm Stuttgart	1956	Concrete tower	(Germany) Stuttgart	153	216.6	
97	Çamlıca Tower	2020	Concrete tower	(Turkey) Istanbul	153	369	
98	Edifício Altino Arantes	1947	Skyscraper	(Brazil) São Paulo	145	161	26th floor
99	Avala Tower	2009	Concrete tower	(Serbia) Belgrade	135	204.5	
100	Mirante do Vale	1967	Skyscraper	(Brazil) São Paulo	133	170	42th floor
101	Fukuoka Tower	1989	Tower	(Japan) Fukuoka	123	234	
102	Kuwait viewing sphere	1979	Concrete tower	Kuwait City	120	187	(1990 Liberation Tower of ~300 m is not open to public).
103	Edifício Acaiaca	1947	Skyscraper	(Brazil) Belo Horizonte	119	119	
104	Edifício Copan	1966	Skyscraper	(Brazil) São Paulo	115	115	32th floor
105	Palace of Culture and Science	1955	Multi-function	(Poland) Warsaw	114	237	Observation deck on 30th floor.
106	Spinnaker Tower	2005	Tower	(United Kingdom) Portsmouth	110	170	
107	Millennium Center 2 office tower restaurant	2016	Skyscraper	(Bulgaria) Sofia	105	108	
107	Edifício Martinelli	1929	Skyscraper	(Brazil) São Paulo	105	105	26th floor
109	Kyoto Tower	1964	Tower	(Japan) Kyoto	100	131	
110	Nagoya TV Tower	1954	Tower	(Japan) Nagoya	100	180	
111	Tashkent Tower	1985	Tower	(Uzbekistan) Tashkent	97	375	
112	Snezhanka Tower, Pamporovo, Bulgaria	1978	Concrete tower	(Bulgaria) Pamporovo	93	156	
113	Kobe Port Tower	1963	Tower	(Japan) Kobe	90.8	108	
114	Statue of Liberty	1886	Statue	(United States) New York City	91	93	
115	Sapporo TV Tower	1957	Tower	(Japan) Sapporo	90	147.2	
116	Tsūtenkaku	1956	Tower	(Japan) Osaka	87.5	108	
117	City-Hochhaus Leipzig	1972	Skyscraper	(Germany) Leipzig	84	142.5	31st floor.
118	Nebraska State Capitol	1930	Skyscraper	(United States) Lincoln	75	120	14th floor.
119	Sesc Avenida Paulista	1970	Skyscraper	(Brazil) São Paulo	70	70	17th floor
120	Arc de Triomphe	1836	Monument	(France) Paris	50	50	Rooftop terrace.

== List of highest observation decks by type ==
Type	Name and Location	Constructed	Height	Notes
Observation Skywalk over vertical cliff free drop	Tianmen Mountain Glass Skywalk, China	2016	1,430 m (4,690 ft)	
Observation deck inside a spire	Merdeka 118, Kuala Lumpur, Malaysia	2023	566 m (1,857 ft)	
Enclosed observation deck on high-rise building	Shanghai Tower, Shanghai and Ping An Finance Centre, Shenzhen, China	2015 and 2017	562 m (1,844 ft)	
Outdoor observation deck on high-rise building	Burj Khalifa, Dubai, UAE	2014	555.7 m (1,823 ft)	
Skywalk over (artificial) waterfall free drop	Sky Corridor Waterfall Walkway, Huangteng Gorge, Guangdong, China	2018	500 m (1,640 ft)	
Observation deck on tower	Canton Tower, Guangzhou, China	2011	488 m (1,601 ft)	
Skywalk over high-rise building	Skydeck (The Ledge) observation deck glass balconies, Willis Tower, Chicago, United States	2009	412.4 m (1,353 ft)	
Outdoor pool	Autograph Tower, Jakarta, Indonesia	2025	382.9 m (1,256 ft)	
Skywalk over bridge	Zhangjiajie Glass Bridge, Zhangjiajie, China	2016	300 m (984 ft)	
Skywalk over glacier	Glacier Skywalk, Jasper National Park, Alberta, Canada	2014	280 m (919 ft)	

== Under construction ==
- 2030 (est) Burj Azizi, Dubai, United Arab Emirates. 649 m, Level 130
- 2029 (est) North Bund Centre, Shanghai, China. 394.5 m, Level 84
- 2028 (est) Jeddah Tower, Jeddah, Saudi Arabia. 634 m, Level 157
- 2027 (est) Goldin Finance 117, Tianjin, China. 578.1 m, Level 116
- 2023 (est.) Merdeka 118, Kuala Lumpur, Malaysia. 517.7 m, Level 117 (Spire observation level at 566 m)
- 2030 (est.) Senna Tower, Balneário Camboriú, Brazil. 505 m, Level 140
- 2026 (est) Torre Rise, Monterrey, Mexico. 354 m, Level 93 and 365 m, Level 96
- 2028 (est.) Torch Tower, Tokyo, Japan. 352 m, Level 55
- 2027 (est) Taipei Twin Towers, Taipei, Taiwan. 347 m, Level 73

Approved

- 2025 (est.) Signature Tower Jakarta, Jakarta, Indonesia. 515.8 m, Level 111
- 2030 (est.) Millennium Tower, Frankfurt, Germany. 280 m, Level 67

== Destroyed ==
- 2 World Trade Center, Top of the World observation deck, outdoor observation deck on top of building, 1,362 feet (415 m), World Trade Center (1973–2001), New York, United States - Destroyed during the September 11 attacks

== Gallery ==
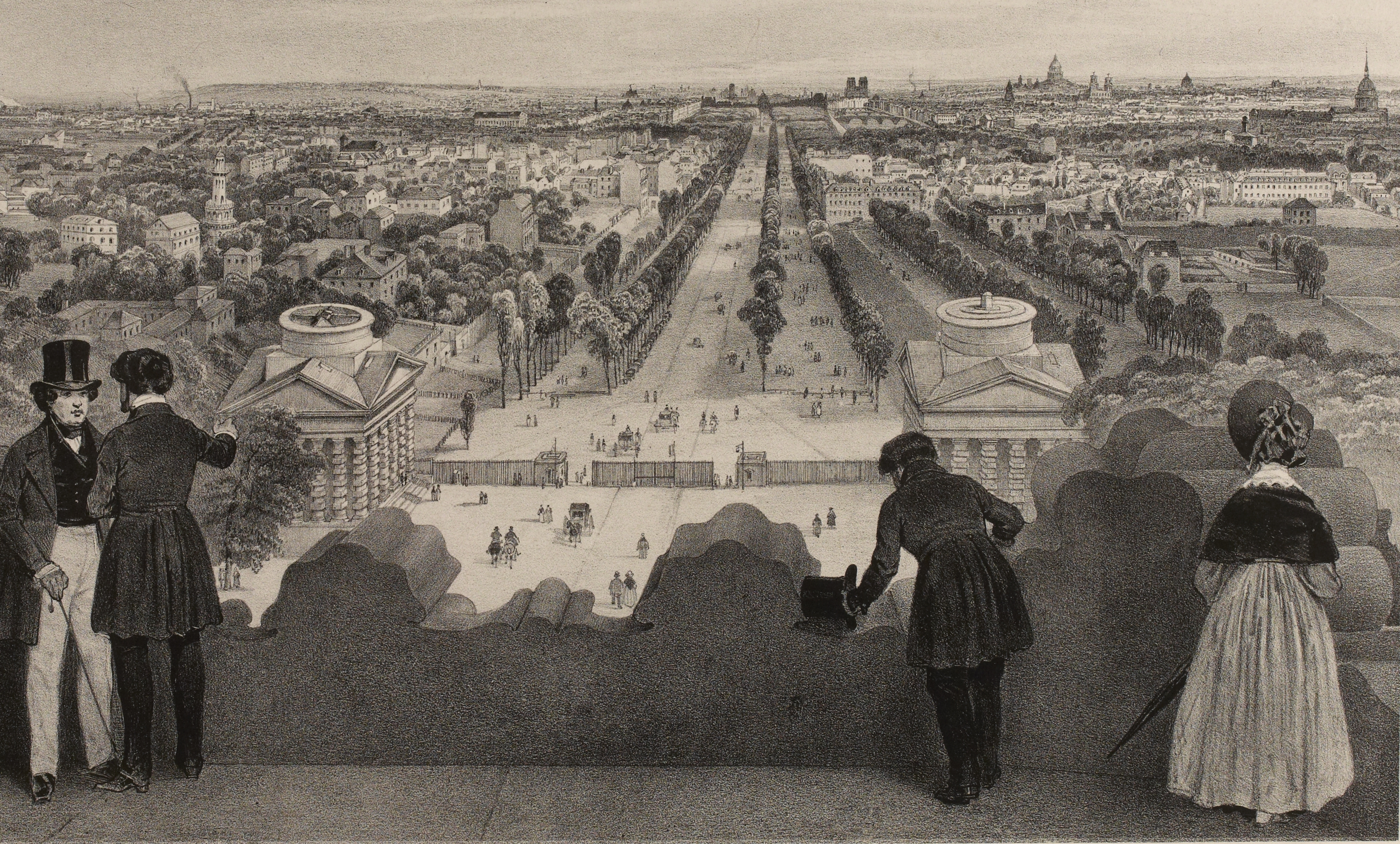
General view of Paris from the rooftop terrace of the Arc de Triomphe, c. 1840.

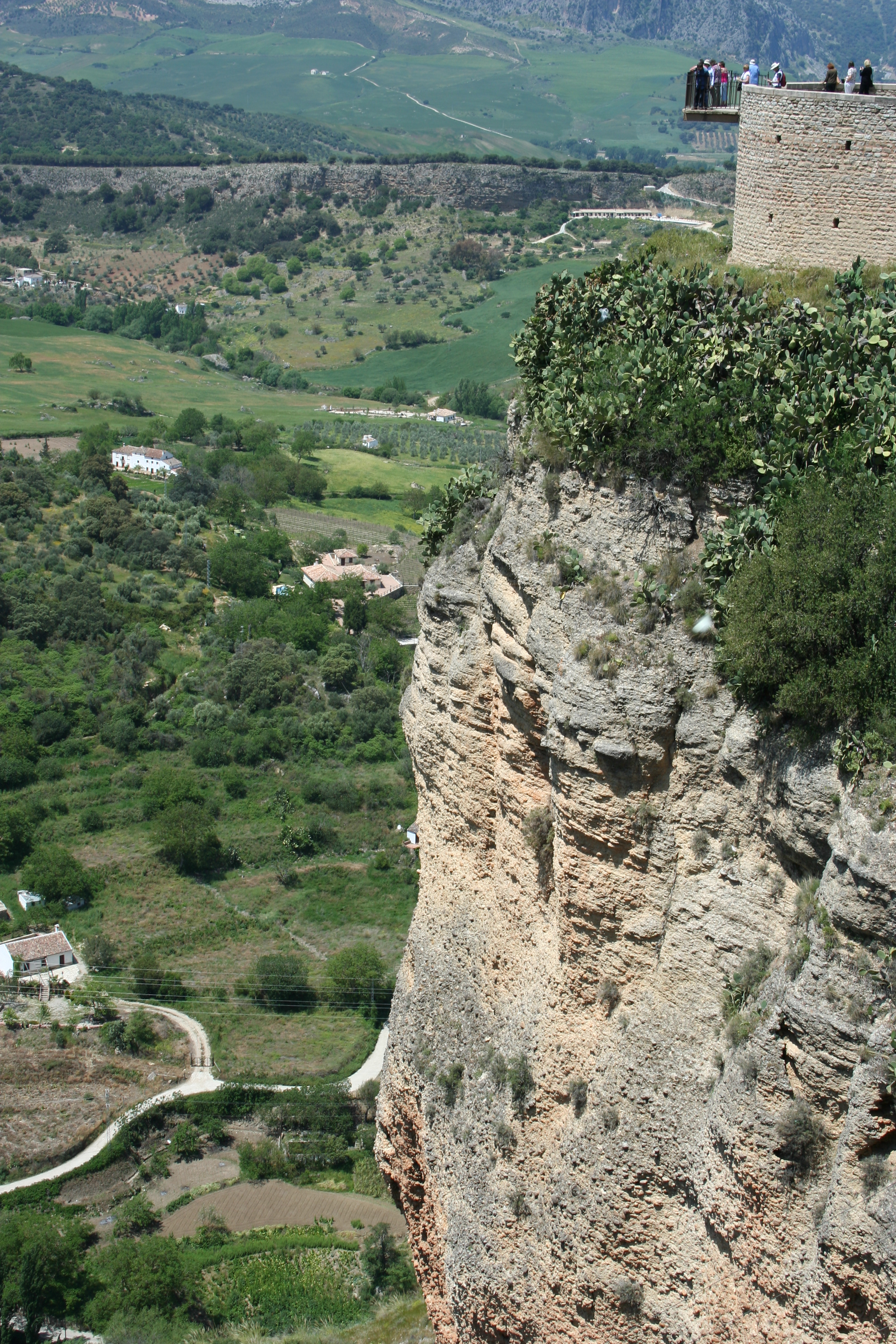
The 10 m observation deck of Ronda, Spain, overlooks the Depression of Ronda plain over 100 m below.

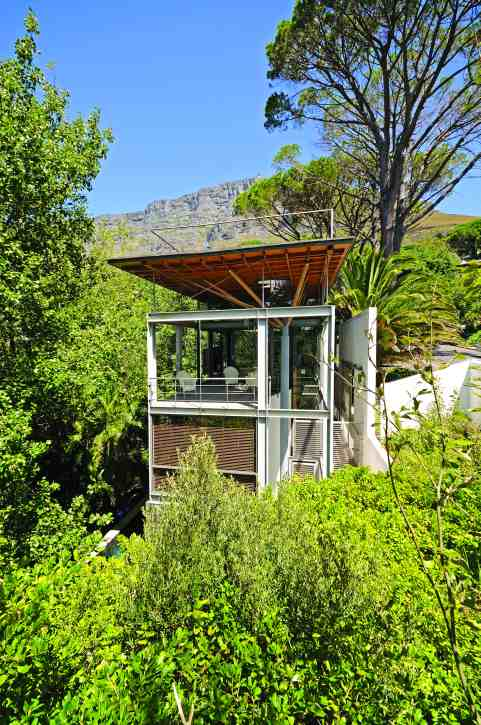
A multi-level tree house in Cape Town, South Africa, with an observation deck on top.

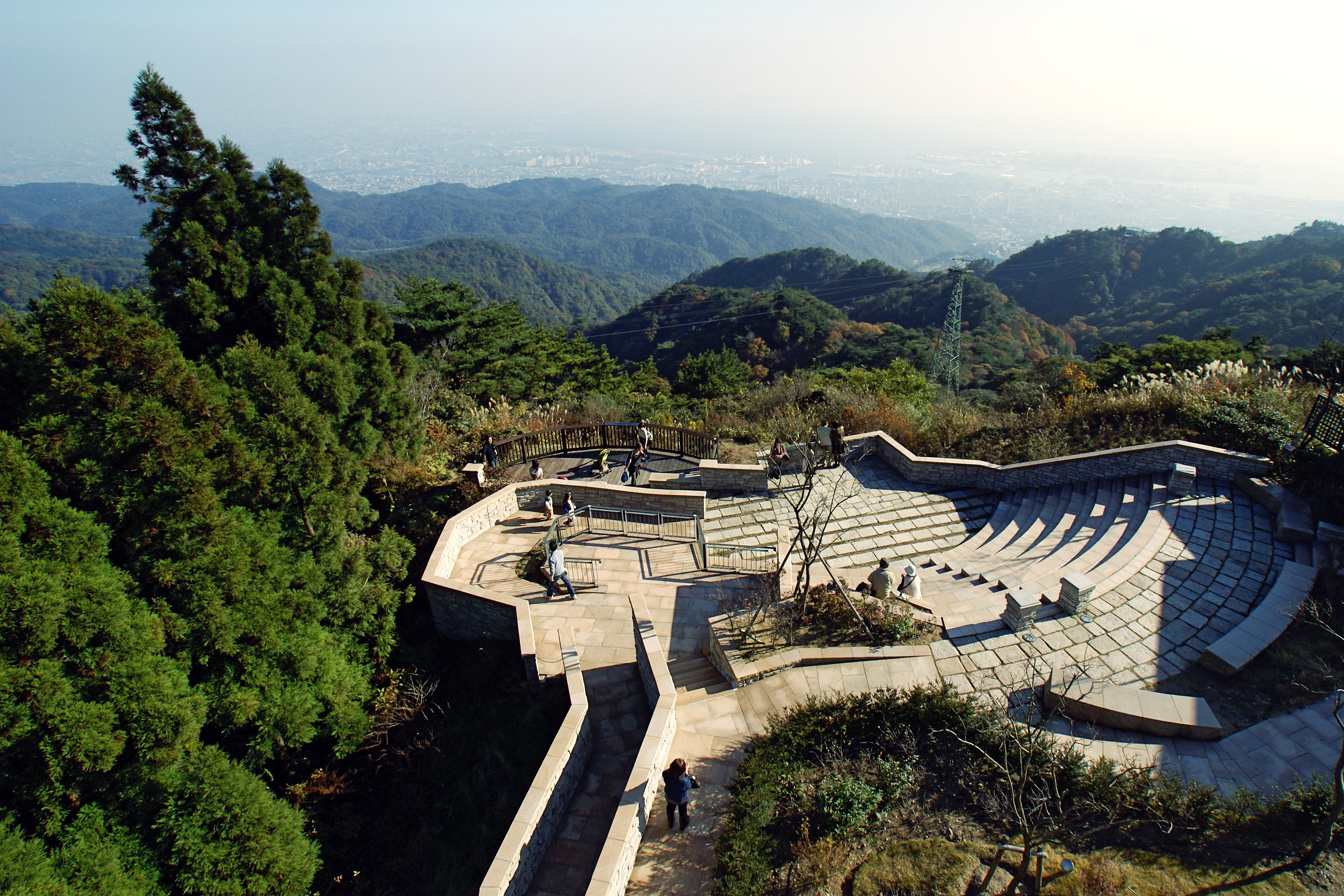
An observation deck place in Rokko Garden Terrace, Mount Rokkō, Kobe, Japan.

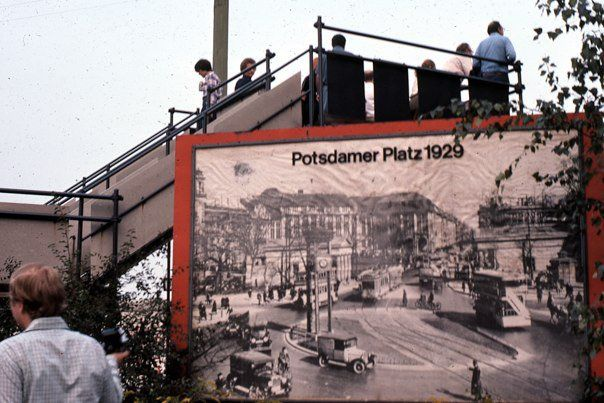
An observation deck in West Berlin with a view of Potsdamer Platz on the other side of the Berlin Wall, 1977. At the bottom of the steps a placard shows what the square looked like in 1929.

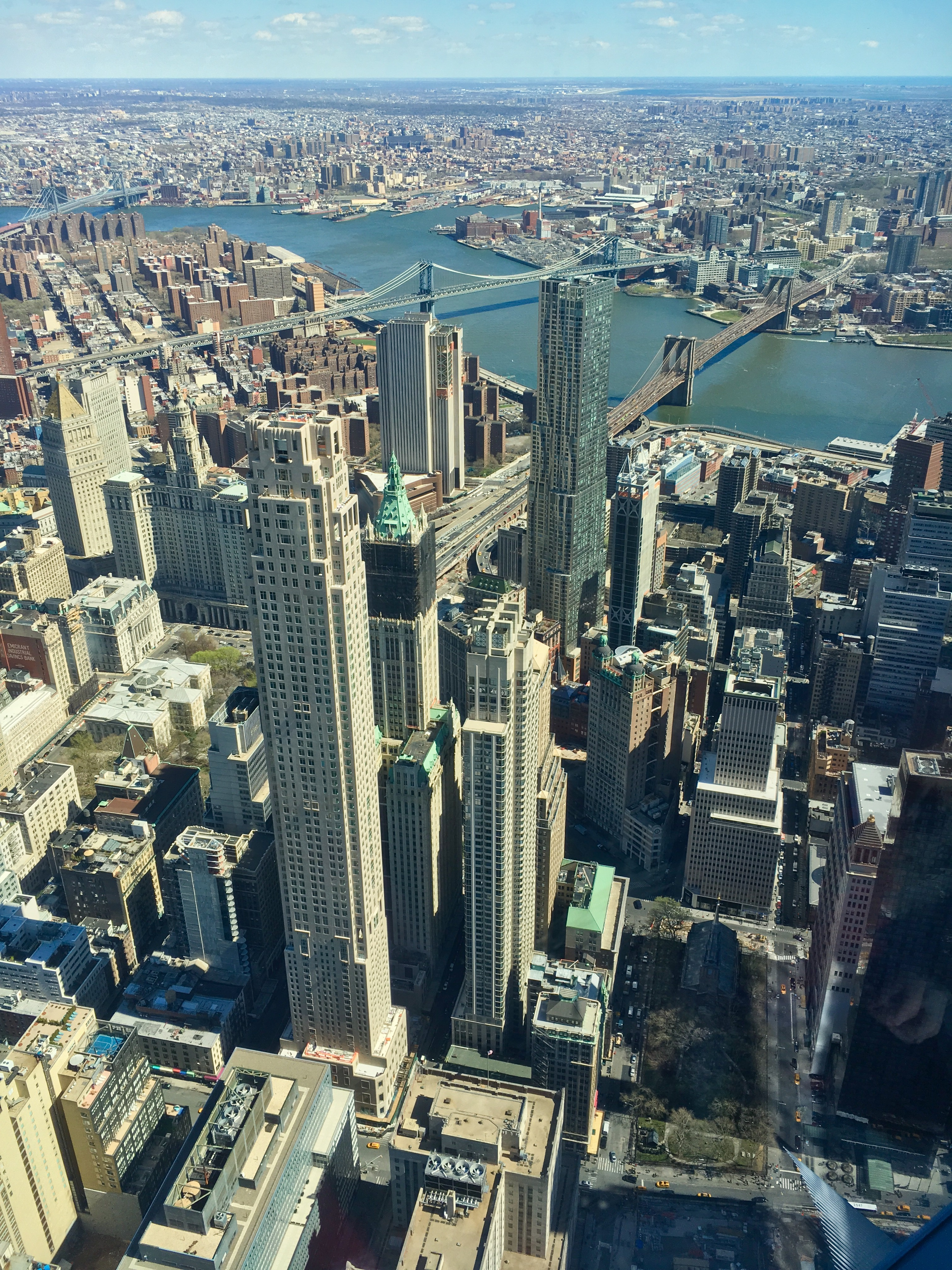
Brooklyn Bridge as viewed from the One World Observatory in New York City.

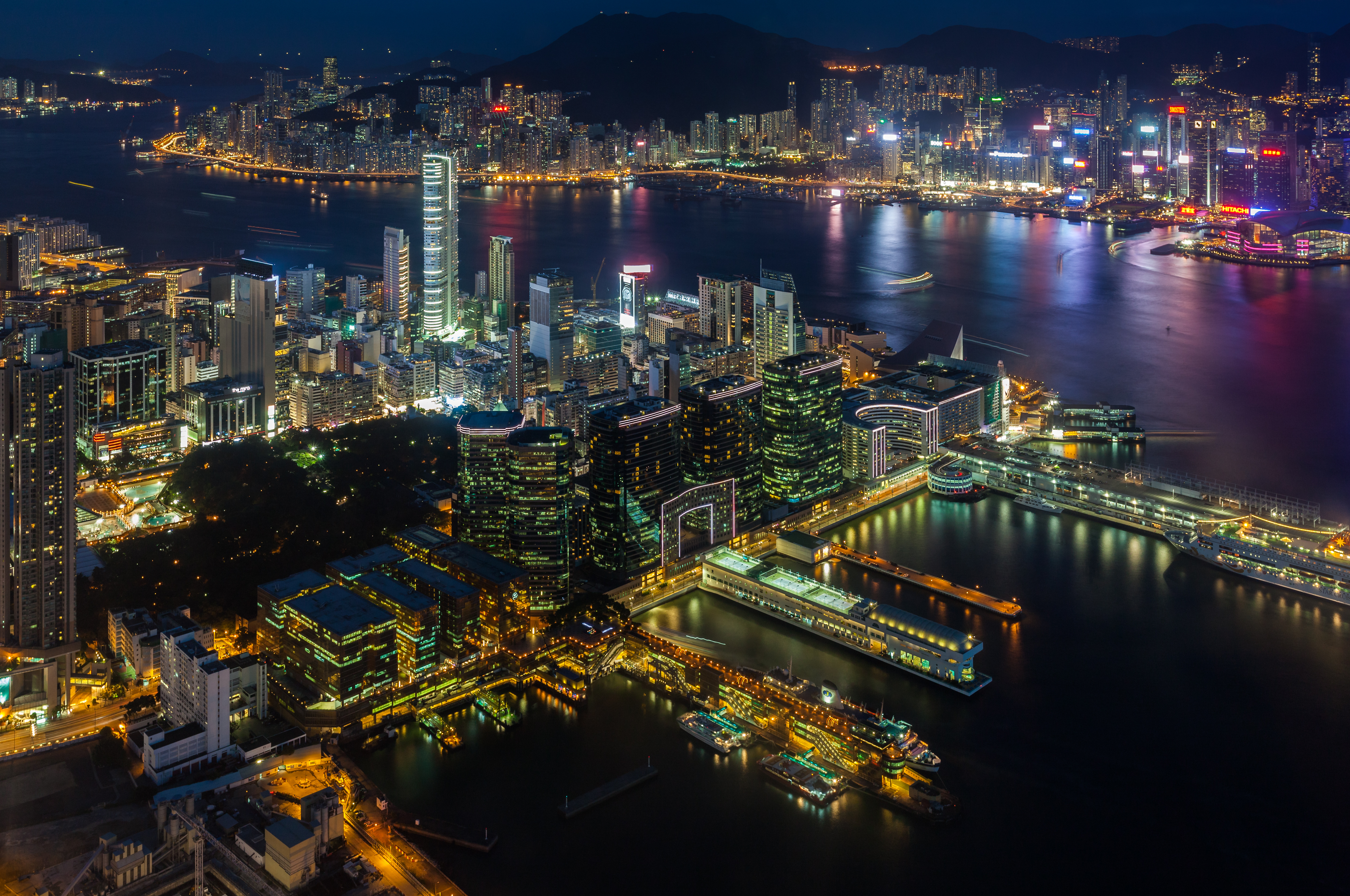
Night View of the Victoria Harbour, Hong Kong from sky100.

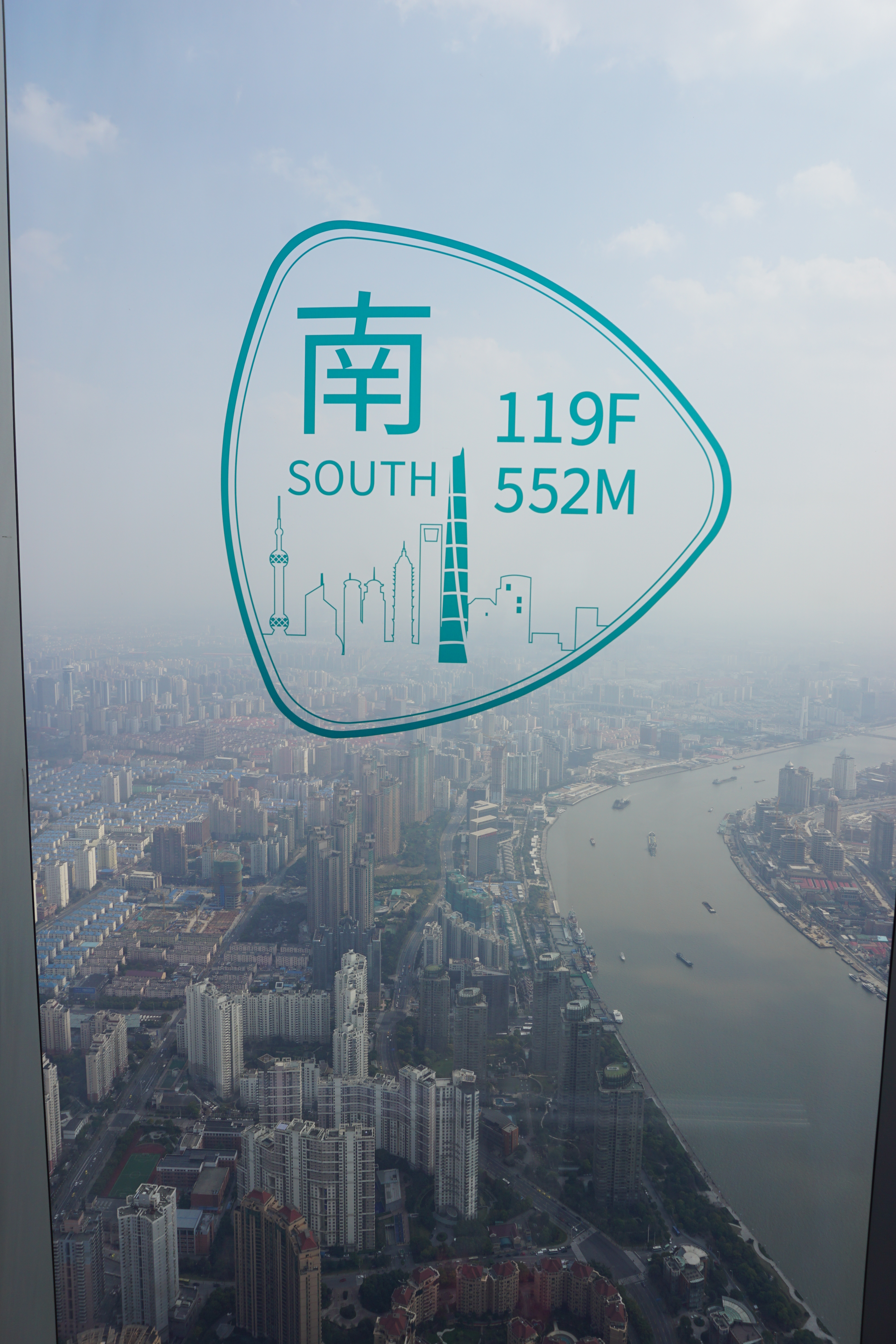
View from the Shanghai Tower observation deck.

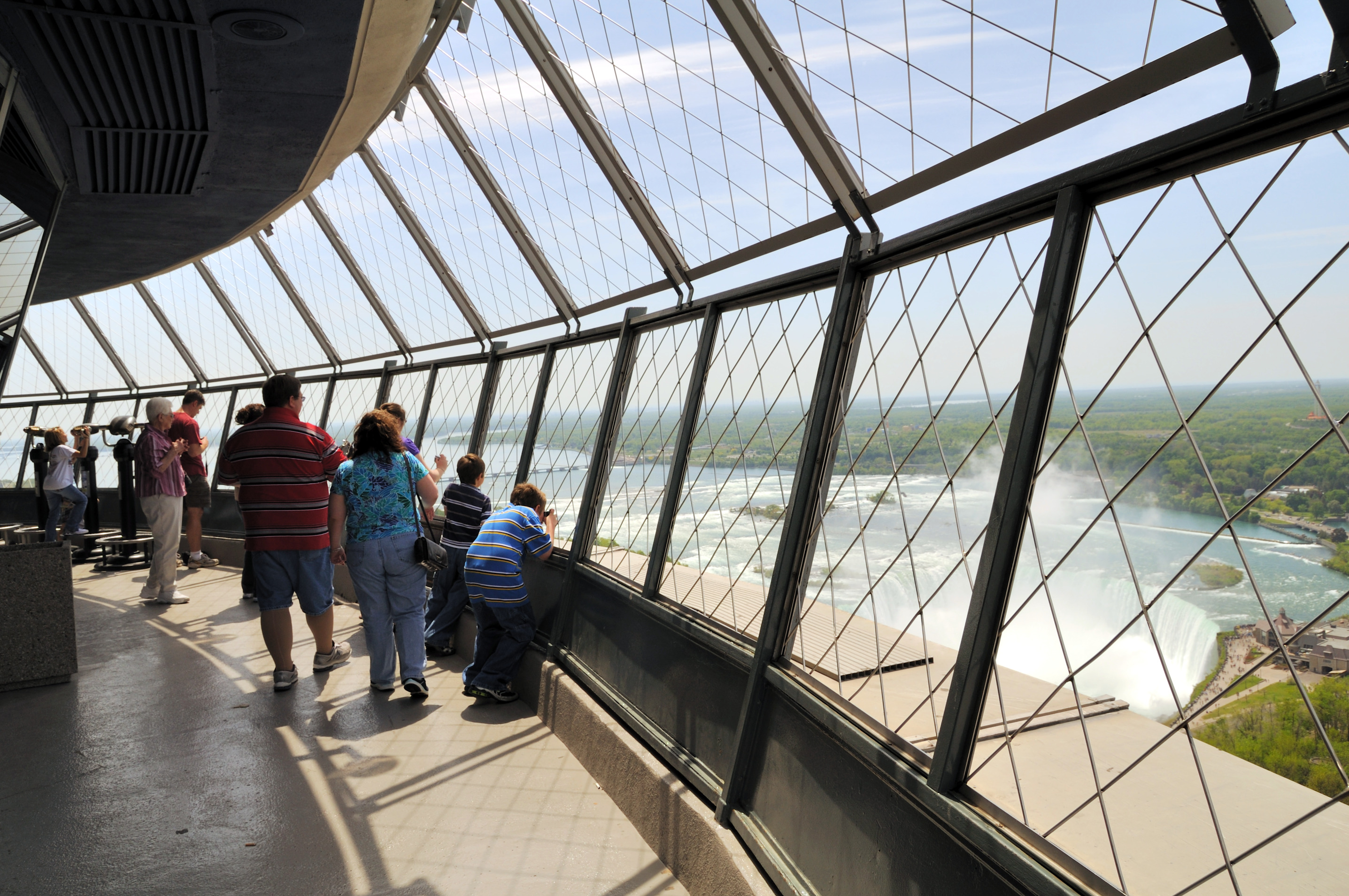
Visitors on the observation deck of the Skylon Tower, which overlooks Niagara Falls.

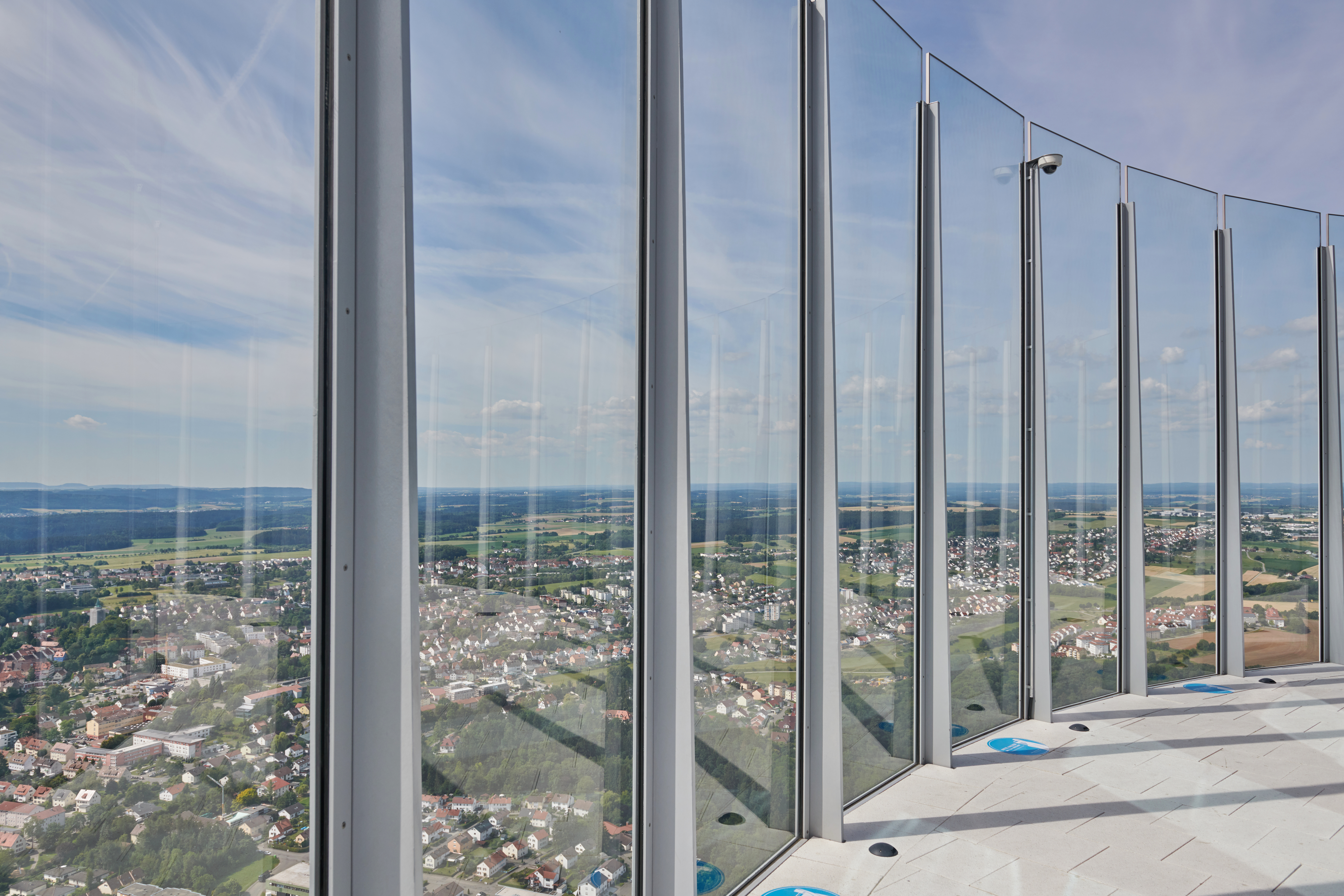
The observation deck from the TK Elevator Test Tower, which overlooks Germany's Black Forest and the Alps.

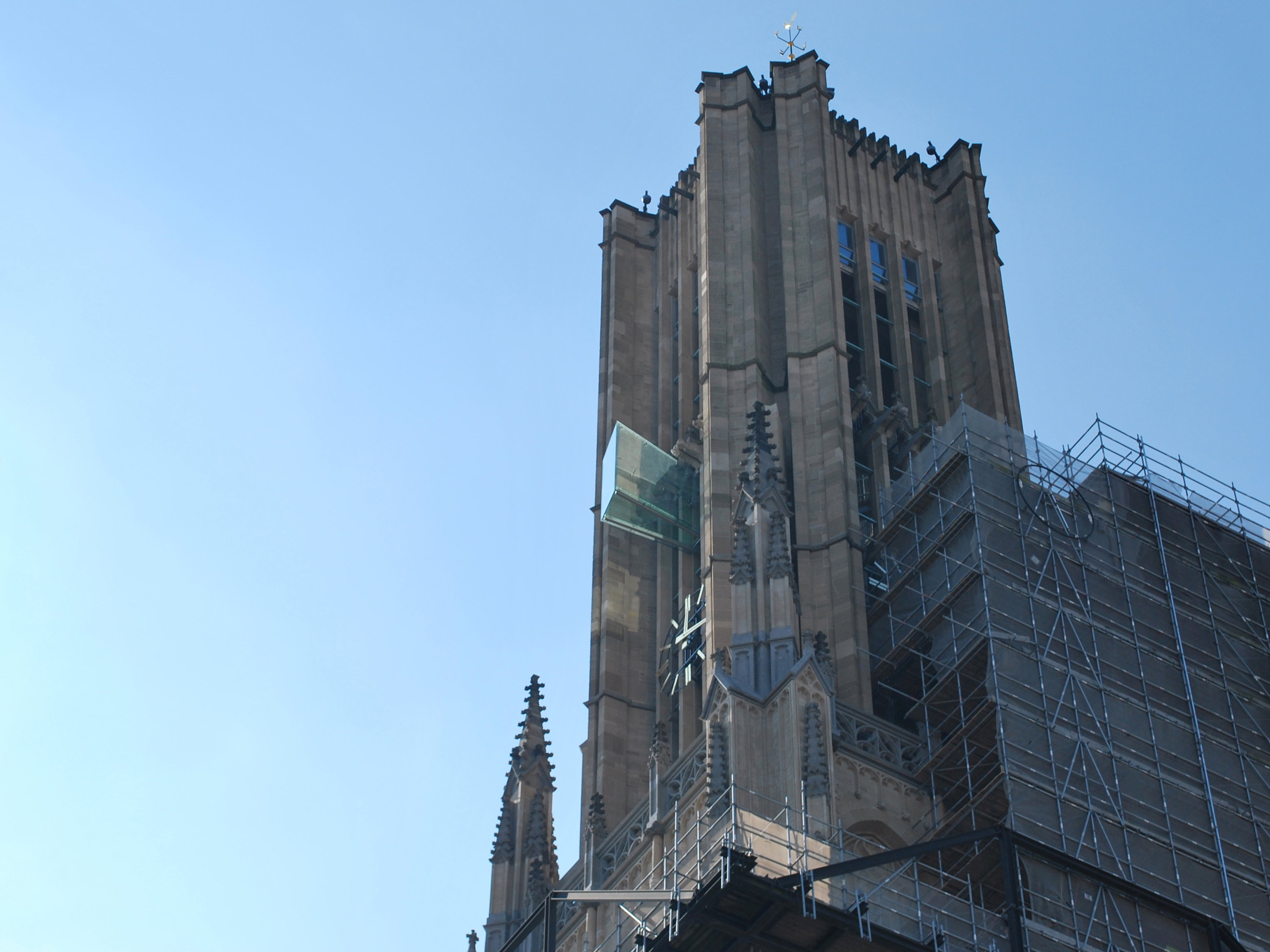
Glass balconies attached to the St Eusebius Church in Arnhem, Netherlands.

Footage of the panoramic views during an 1898 ascent of the Eiffel Tower by the Lumière brothers.

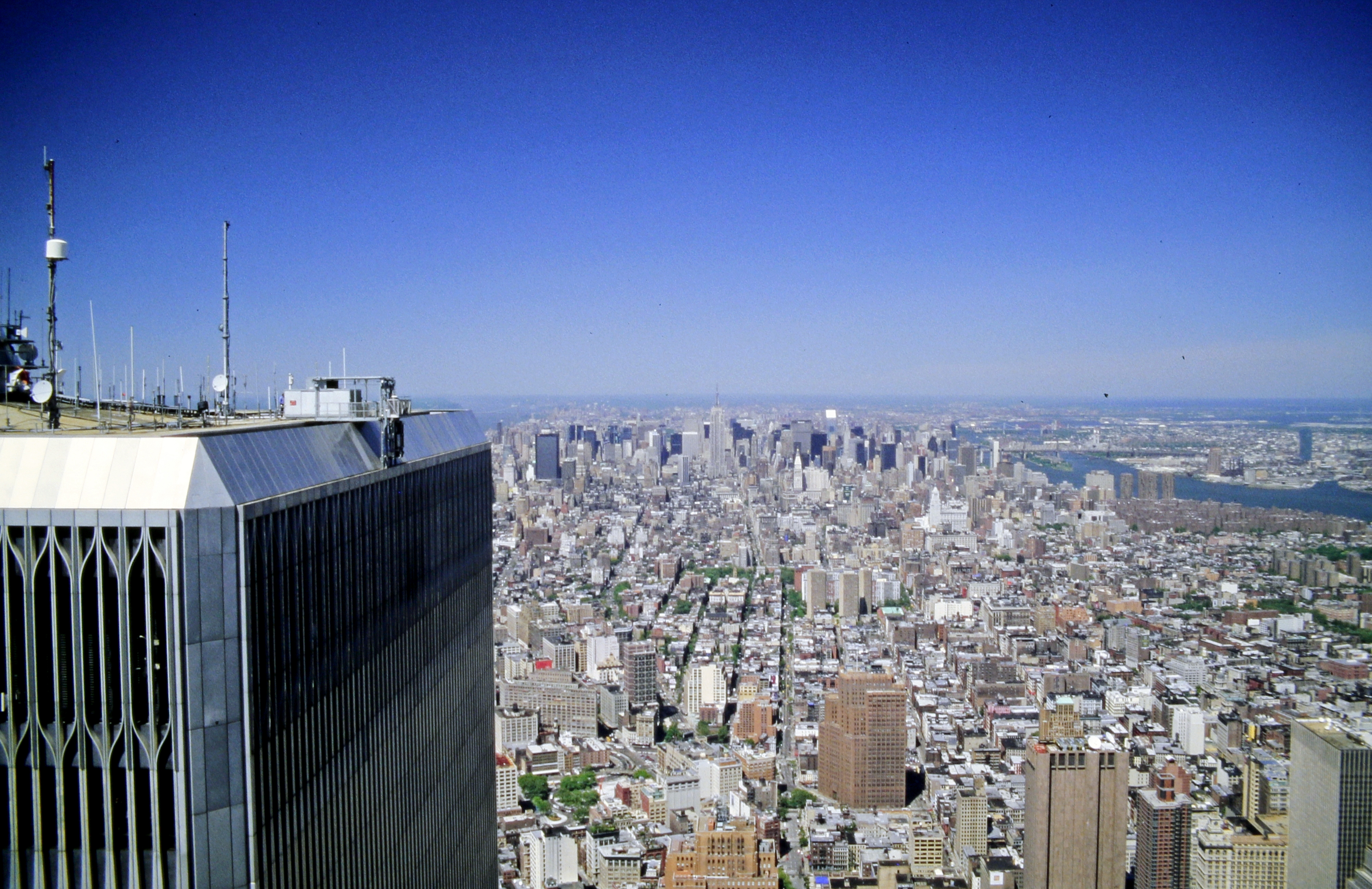
View of Manhattan, NYC from the former 2 World Trade Center observation deck, 1999

View of Historic Center of São Paulo, SP, from the Edifício Altino Arantes, observation deck.

== See also ==
- Observation car
- Observation wheel
- Timeline of world's highest observation decks
