= Qingxin, Qingyuan =

District in Guangdong, China

Qingxin 清新区
- District
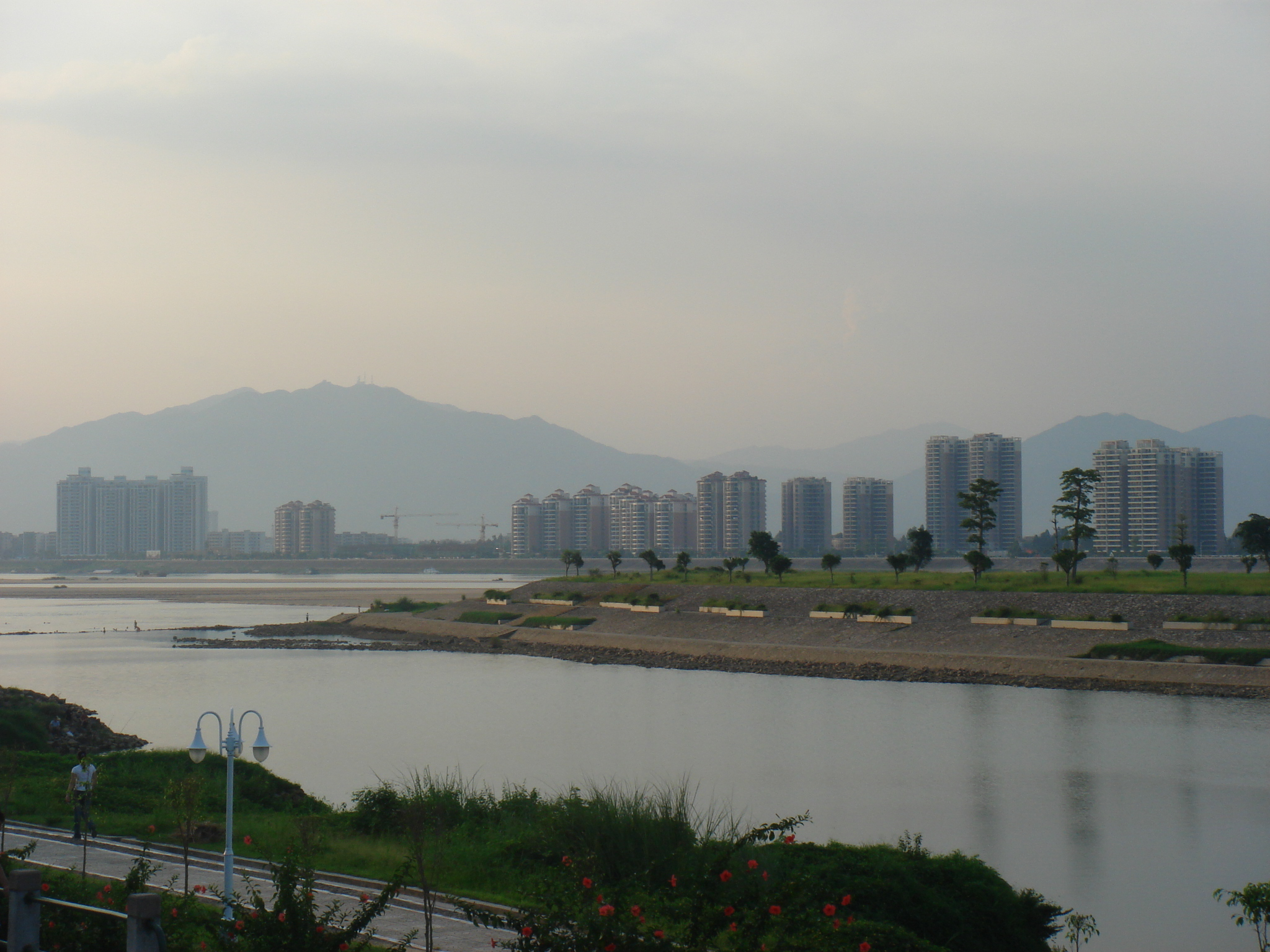

- Location in Guangdong
- Coordinates: 23°53′N 112°51′E
- Country: People's Republic of China
- Province: Guangdong
- Prefecture-level city: Qingyuan

Area
  - Total: 2,579 km^{2} (996 sq mi)
- Time zone: UTC+8 (China Standard)

Qingxin District (Chinese: 清新区; pinyin: Qīngxīn Qū), formerly Qingxin County, is a district of Qingyuan City, in northwest-central Guangdong province, China. It is a key administrative and economic component of the Pearl River Delta's extended region, known for its rich natural resources, tourism, and rapid industrial development.

== History ==
The area has a long history of administrative evolution. It was originally part of the ancient Qingyuan County. In 1992, the Qingjiao District of Qingyuan City was abolished, and Qingxin County was established in its place. On November 15, 2012, the State Council of China approved the abolition of Qingxin County and the establishment of Qingxin District, with the administrative area remaining the same. The district government is located in Taihe Town.

== Geography ==
Qingxin District is located in the middle of Guangdong Province, bordering the Bei River (North River). It covers a total area of approximately 2,725 square kilometers. The terrain is diverse, featuring mountains in the north and plains in the south. The district is characterized by a subtropical monsoon climate, with abundant rainfall and an average annual temperature of around 21.6°C.

== Administration ==
The district is divided into 8 towns:

•Taihe (太和镇) - The administrative seat

•Sankeng (三坑镇)

•Shantan (山塘镇)

•Taiping (太平镇)

•He'yun (禾云镇)

•Longjing (龙颈镇)

•Jinpu (浸潭镇)

•Shitan (石潭镇)

== Economy ==
Qingxin's economy is a mix of traditional agriculture and modern industry. It is a national base for high-quality agricultural products, including the famous "Qingyuan Chicken." In recent years, the district has focused on industrial upgrading, particularly in building materials, electronics, and new energy. The Qingxin Industrial Park is a major hub for these activities.

== Tourism ==
Qingxin is a popular destination for eco-tourism and hot springs. Key attractions include:

•Gulong Gorge (古龙峡): Known for its spectacular waterfalls, glass bridge, and international-standard white-water rafting.

•Qingxin Hot Springs: Known for their therapeutic properties, attracting visitors from across the Pearl River Delta.

•Taihe Ancient Cave: A scenic area featuring Taoist temples and natural limestone formations.

== Transportation ==
The district is well-connected by a network of highways, including the G107 National Highway and the Guangqing Expressway, which links it directly to Guangzhou. The Bei River provides important water transport routes for industrial goods.
