= Qingyuan =

Qingyuan 清远市 Tsingyun
- Prefecture-level city
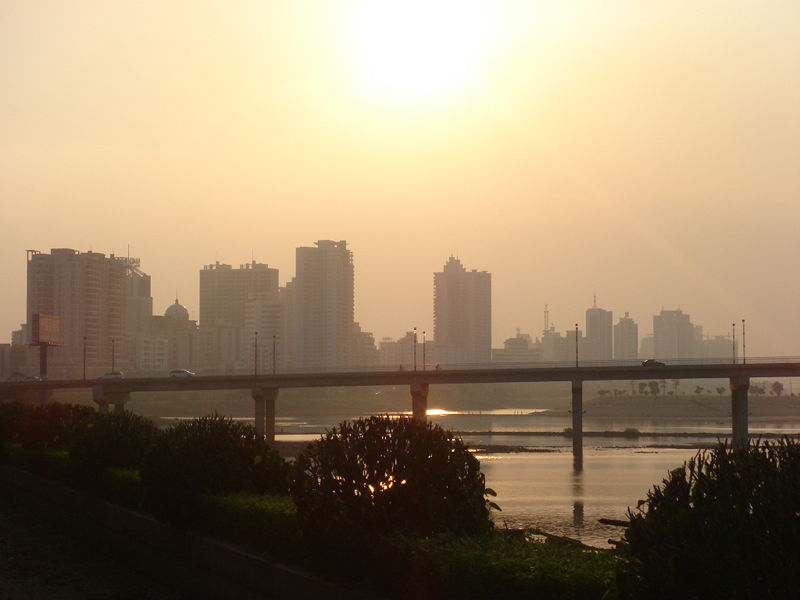
- Qingcheng District

- Location of Qingyuan in Guangdong
- Interactive map of Qingyuan
- Location of the city center in Guangdong Qingyuan (China)
- Coordinates (Qingyuan municipal government): 23°40′55″N 113°03′22″E
- Country: People's Republic of China
- Province: Guangdong
- County-level divisions: 9
- Township-level divisions: 53
- City seat: Qingcheng District

Area
  - Prefecture-level city: 19,152.9 km^{2} (7,395.0 sq mi)
  - Urban: 3,652.3 km^{2} (1,410.2 sq mi)
  - Metro: 3,652.3 km^{2} (1,410.2 sq mi)

Dimensions
  - Length: 190 km (120 mi)
  - Width: 230 km (140 mi)
- Elevation: 14 m (46 ft)

Population (2020 Census)
  - Prefecture-level city: 3,969,473
  - Density: 207.252/km^{2} (536.780/sq mi)
  - Urban: 1,738,424
  - Urban density: 475.98/km^{2} (1,232.8/sq mi)
  - Metro: 1,738,424
  - Metro density: 475.98/km^{2} (1,232.8/sq mi)

GDP
  - Prefecture-level city: CN¥ 200.7 billion US$ 31.1 billion
  - Per capita: CN¥ 50,459; US$ 7,821
- Time zone: UTC+8 (China Standard)
- Postal codes: 511500, 511515
- Area code: 0763
- ISO 3166 code: CN-GD-18
- Licence plate prefixes: 粤R
- Major Nationalities: Han, Zhuang and Yao
- Website: www.gdqy.gov.cn

Qingyuan
- "Qingyuan" in Traditional (top) and Simplified (bottom) Chinese characters
- Simplified Chinese: 清远
- Traditional Chinese: 清遠
- Hanyu Pinyin: Qīngyuǎn
- Cantonese Yale: Chīngyúhn
- Postal: Tsingyun
- Literal meaning: Clear-&-Distant
Transcriptions
Standard Mandarin
- Hanyu Pinyin: Qīngyuǎn
- Gwoyeu Romatzyh: Chingyeuan
- Wade–Giles: Chʻing^{1}-yüan^{3}
- IPA: [tɕʰíŋ.ɥɛ̀n]
Hakka
- Romanization: Chhîn-yén
Yue: Cantonese
- Yale Romanization: Chīngyúhn
- Jyutping: Cing1jyun5
- IPA: [tsʰɪŋ˥.jyn˩˧]
Southern Min
- Hokkien POJ: Chheng-oán
- Tâi-lô: Tshing-uán

Qingyuan, formerly romanized as Tsingyun, (Note: Qingyuan has also sometimes been romanized as Tsing-yuan or Tsing-yuen, Ts'ing-yuen, and Tsing-yuen-heën.) is a prefecture-level city in northern Guangdong province, China, on the banks of the Bei or North River. During the 2020 census, its total population was 3,969,473, out of whom 1,738,424 lived in the built-up (or metro) area made of urbanized Qingcheng and Qingxin districts. The primary spoken language is Cantonese. Covering 19,015 km^{2} (7,342 sq mi), Qingyuan is Guangdong's largest prefecture-level division by land area, and it borders Guangzhou and Foshan to the south, Shaoguan to the east and northeast, Zhaoqing to the south and southwest, and Hunan province and Guangxi Zhuang Autonomous Region to the north. The urban core is surrounded by mountainous areas but is directly connected with Guangzhou and the Pearl River Delta by Highway 107.

== History ==
Qingyuan was a prefecture during Northern and Southern dynasties. However, the administration status of Qingyuan was downgraded to a county in the tenth year of the Kaihuang Era of the Sui dynasty (A.D. 590). Since then, until the formation of the Republic of China in 1911, Qingyuan was governed by Guangzhou prefecture (廣州府).

Under the Qing, the area was known as Qingyuan County. It was later promoted to prefecture-level city status.

== Geography ==
Qingyuan's administrative area ranges in latitude from 23° 26' 56" to 25° 11' 40" N, and in longitude from 111° 55' 17" to 113° 55' 34" E; its urban area is located just north of the Tropic of Cancer, about 60 km (37 mi) from the urban area of Guangzhou and 200 km (120 mi) from both Hong Kong and Macau. Its area of over 19,000 km^{2} (7,300 sq mi) accounts for 10.6% of the total provincial area. Qingyuan contains part of the southern Nan Ling, and more than half of the area is mountainous, and elevations increase from southeast to northwest. Bordering prefectures are Guangzhou and Foshan to the southeast, Zhaoqing to the southwest, Shaoguan to the north and northeast, Hezhou (Guangxi) to the west, and Yongzhou and Chenzhou (Hunan) to the north.

Qingyuan has a monsoon-influenced humid subtropical climate, with an average annual temperature of 20.7 °C (69.3 °F), 1,900 mm (75 in) of rainfall, 1662.2 hours of sunshine, and a frost-free period of 314.4 days.

== Economy ==
Qingyuan is a major economic and transportation hub. The Beijing–Guangzhou Railway, National Highways 106 and 107, and the Bei or North River cross through the city. The maritime infrastructure in Qingyuan plays a vital role in transporting goods to other regional centers in Guangdong, Hong Kong, and Macao. The major ports are Qingyuan Port, Yingde Port, Lianzhou Port and Yangshan Port.

== Demographics ==
According to the 2010 Census, Qingyuan has a population of 3,698,394 inhabitants, 550,715 more than in 2000 (an annual growth rate of 1.63%). Han Chinese comprise over 95% of the entire population, while there are some areas inhabited by the Zhuang and Yao minorities.

== Notable people ==
- Ayen Ho (何璟昕) : (b. 1994) Chinese C-pop (Cantopop and Mandopop) singer-songwriter
- Xi Nanhua (席南华) : (b. 1963) Chinese mathematician

== Attractions ==
Qingyuan's attractions include Niuyuzui, Feilai Temple, Feixia Scenic Spots, Baojing Palace of Yingde, Taihe Ancient Cave of Qingxin, Sankeng Hot Spring in Qingxin County, Huanghua Lake in Fogang, Little Biejiang of Lianyang, Peak Shikengkong in Yangshan County, Underground River of Lianzhou, Huangteng Gorge, Three Gorges of Huangchuan and Yinzhan Hot Springs.

== Administration ==
The provincial and municipal administration is located in Qingcheng District. It oversees one other district, two county-level cities, four counties, and one economic development district.

Map
Name	Simplified Chinese	Hanyu Pinyin	Population (2010 census)	Area (km^{2})	Density (/km^{2})
Qingcheng District	清城区	Qīngchéng Qū	811,233	927.22	875
Qingxin District	清新区	Qīngxīn Qū	698,811	2,725.07	256
Fogang County	佛冈县	Fógāng Xiàn	302,906	1,292.92	234
Yangshan County	阳山县	Yángshān Xiàn	356,095	3,418.37	104
Lianshan Zhuang and Yao Autonomous County	连山壮族 瑶族自治县	Liánshān Zhuàngzú; Yáozú Zìzhìxiàn	90,515	1,164.84	78
Liannan Yao; Autonomous County	连南瑶族 自治县	Liánnán Yáozú; Zìzhìxiàn	129,258	1,239.38	100
Yingde	英德市	Yīngdé Shì	941,952	5,671.02	166
Lianzhou	连州市	Liánzhōu Shì	367,642	2,664.09	138

== Climate ==
Climate data for Qingyuan, elevation 79 m (259 ft), (1991–2020 normals, extremes 1957–present)
Month	Jan	Feb	Mar	Apr	May	Jun	Jul	Aug	Sep	Oct	Nov	Dec	Year
Record high °C (°F)	28.6 (83.5)	30.0 (86.0)	33.4 (92.1)	34.3 (93.7)	38.5 (101.3)	38.1 (100.6)	39.0 (102.2)	38.7 (101.7)	38.2 (100.8)	36.4 (97.5)	33.2 (91.8)	29.1 (84.4)	39.0 (102.2)
Mean daily maximum °C (°F)	17.5 (63.5)	18.9 (66.0)	21.0 (69.8)	25.7 (78.3)	29.7 (85.5)	31.9 (89.4)	33.4 (92.1)	33.4 (92.1)	32.0 (89.6)	29.0 (84.2)	24.7 (76.5)	19.8 (67.6)	26.4 (79.6)
Daily mean °C (°F)	13.1 (55.6)	14.9 (58.8)	17.5 (63.5)	22.1 (71.8)	25.7 (78.3)	27.8 (82.0)	28.9 (84.0)	28.8 (83.8)	27.4 (81.3)	24.3 (75.7)	19.8 (67.6)	15.0 (59.0)	22.1 (71.8)
Mean daily minimum °C (°F)	10.2 (50.4)	12.1 (53.8)	14.9 (58.8)	19.4 (66.9)	22.8 (73.0)	24.9 (76.8)	25.7 (78.3)	25.6 (78.1)	24.2 (75.6)	20.9 (69.6)	16.3 (61.3)	11.7 (53.1)	19.1 (66.3)
Record low °C (°F)	0.0 (32.0)	−0.6 (30.9)	2.8 (37.0)	7.6 (45.7)	13.9 (57.0)	18.3 (64.9)	21.4 (70.5)	19.9 (67.8)	14.2 (57.6)	8.5 (47.3)	3.2 (37.8)	1.0 (33.8)	−0.6 (30.9)
Average precipitation mm (inches)	59.0 (2.32)	61.3 (2.41)	144.6 (5.69)	227.1 (8.94)	348.9 (13.74)	397.0 (15.63)	259.8 (10.23)	238.7 (9.40)	146.5 (5.77)	59.1 (2.33)	50.9 (2.00)	43.7 (1.72)	2,036.6 (80.18)
Average precipitation days (≥ 0.1 mm)	9.2	11.6	18.5	18.0	19.9	20.3	18.0	16.5	11.6	5.3	6.8	6.2	161.9
Average relative humidity (%)	70	75	81	82	82	84	81	80	76	67	67	64	76
Mean monthly sunshine hours	105.6	76.6	60.0	69.9	109.1	133.1	193.3	196.6	198.7	201.9	167.2	152.3	1,664.3
Percentage possible sunshine	31	24	16	18	26	33	47	49	54	57	51	46	38
Source: China Meteorological Administrationall-time record lowrecord lows by month up to 2017

== Transportation ==
Qingyuan is served by Qingyuan railway station, opened in 2009 on the Wuhan–Guangzhou high-speed railway. It is located some distance east of the city.

The Qingyuan Maglev opened on January 25, 2025.
