= Ayen Ho =

Chinese singer

Ayen Ho 何璟昕
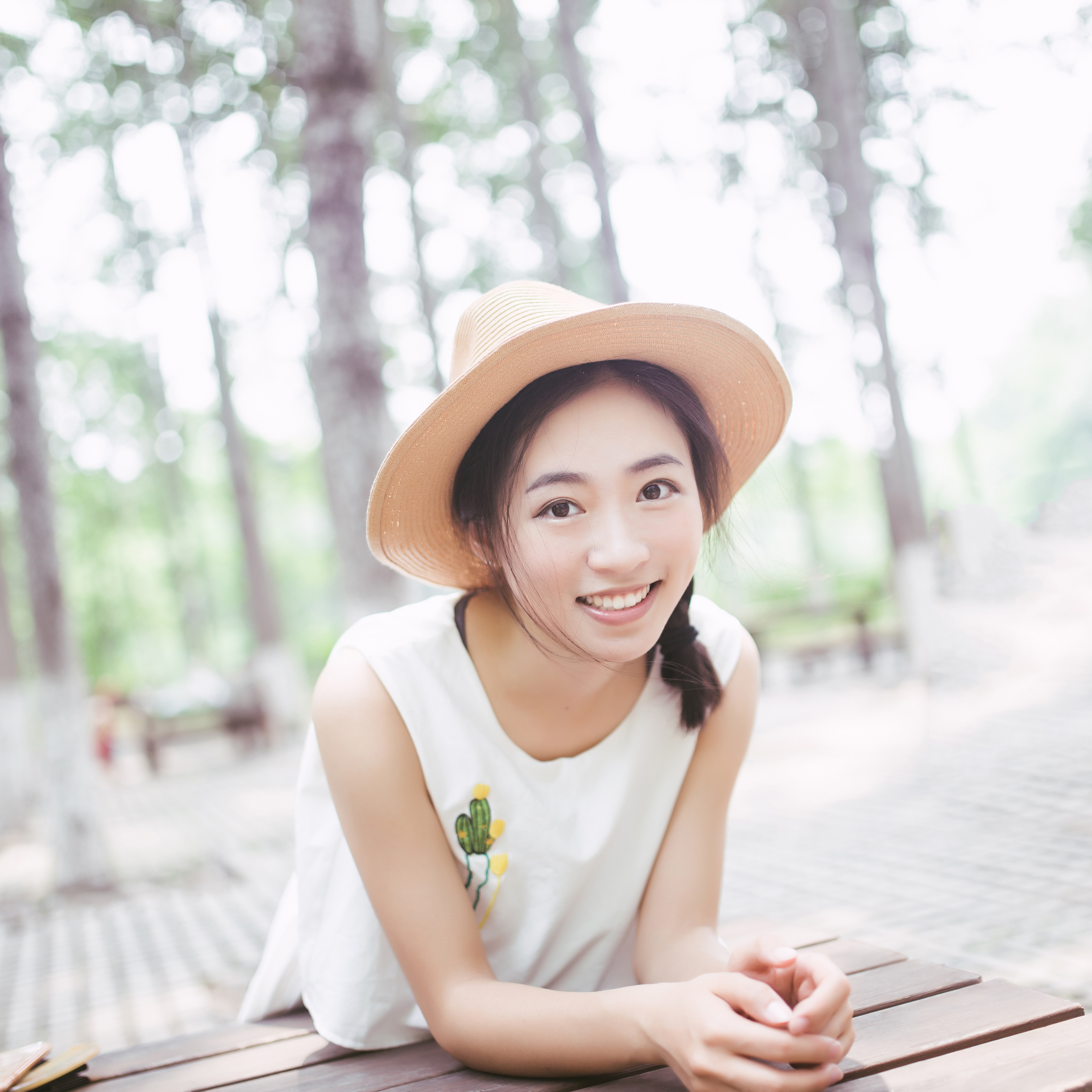

Background information
- Born: He Jingxin; 6 March 1994 (age 31); Qingyuan, Guangdong, China
- Genres: Cantopop; folk; mandopop
- Occupations: Singer; guitarist; songwriter
- Instruments: Guitar; piano; cello; ukulele
- Website: www.youtube.com/@Ayen

Ayen Ho
- Chinese: 何璟昕
Transcriptions
Standard Mandarin
- Hanyu Pinyin: Hé Jǐngxīn
Yue: Cantonese
- Jyutping: ho4 ging2 jan1

He Jingxin (Chinese: 何璟昕; born 6 March 1994) or known as Ayen Ho is a Chinese C-pop (Cantopop and Mandopop) singer-songwriter born in Qingyuan, Guangdong province. Ho has released songs and albums in Mandarin and Cantonese and she is considered one of the pioneers of mainland-Chinese Cantopop wave. She also creates most of her music, music videos and other videos using her skills learned from her college and graduate school (see Career section below). She currently lives in Beijing.

== Early life ==
Ayen Ho was born on 6 March 1994 in Qingyuan, Guangdong Province. She moved with her family to Huizhou, Guangdong Province, where she lived during her school years. She started to take piano lesson when she was 6 years old. She began to learn guitar in middle school. Both her parents were Chinese Language teachers when she grew up.

In 2012, after graduating from high school, Ho moved to Beijing and started to study in the digital media and arts department of the North China University of Technology. She started learning to play ukulele, as well as performing with guitar and ukulele during that time. A year later, she won a music contest organized by the same institution, and that helped her jumpstarting her music career.

== Career ==
In 2016, Ho released her first Mandarin EP entitled Phototrophism. Technically she wrote the song Phototrophism in 2011 and debuted the song in 2014. She released more original songs and performed in many song contests in cities such as Beijing, Shanghai and Shenzhen.

Between 2014 and 2017, she debuted or sang quite a few Cantonese, Mandarin and English songs，mainly using her own acoustic guitar or ukulele as accompanying instruments，and posted some of the videos on Sohu.com.

In 2016, after graduating from university, Ho went on with her music career organizing a tour around 16 Chinese cities. Also in 2016, she was nominated to the Abilu Music awards for a song entitled "如果今天天气正好 Nice day, Blossom age, without you".

In 2017, Ho composed music for TV commercials for companies such as Chevrolet, Pacific Insurance Company and also took part in a music event organised by Netease Cloud Music. At the end of that year, she took part in an exposition of musical instruments in Shanghai where she performed some of her songs.

In 2018, she started studying for a Master's Degree in Music Composition in Quanzhou Normal University at Quanzhou city, Fujian Province.

In 2019, Ho released her first full-length Cantonese album entitled Maybe today.

In 2021 she received the Master's degree in Music Composition.

In last few years especially since 2020 pandemic，she continue to sing quite a few cantonese and mandarin pop songs，mostly using acoustic guitar as accompanying instruments, and published them in various platforms such as Bilibili and YouTube and other platforms。

On 21 December 2024, she won the 2nd "seeking singer/creator" competition organized by Talent Union and Tencent. Her song for the final round is "Sky full of stars".

== Discography ==
=== Studio albums ===
- Phototrophism (2016)
- Maybe today (2019)

=== Singles ===
- "Shooting star" (2016)
- "An afternoon" (2016)
- "Cloudy landscape" (2017)
- "One play, one dream" (2019)
- "Moonlight" (2019)
- "Obsessed guy" (2019)
- "Kite" (2019)
- "Await one thing everyday" (2019)
- "Miss You 3000" (2020, Cantonese)
- "Falling in Love with Something Similar to You" (2020)
- "I am gonna looking for you this September" (2024)
- "Sky fall of stars" (2024)
- "After letting go" (2024)
- "Time doesn't wait for you" (2024)
- 2025.3 A Spring Love Song Mandarin
- 2025.5 Waiting for someone who won't come to McDonalds Cantonese
- 2025.6 Lovestuck people are most heartbroken Cantonese
- 2025.8 Moon is high in the sky Cantonese
