= Huangteng Gorge =

Gorge in Guangdong, China

- 黄腾峡
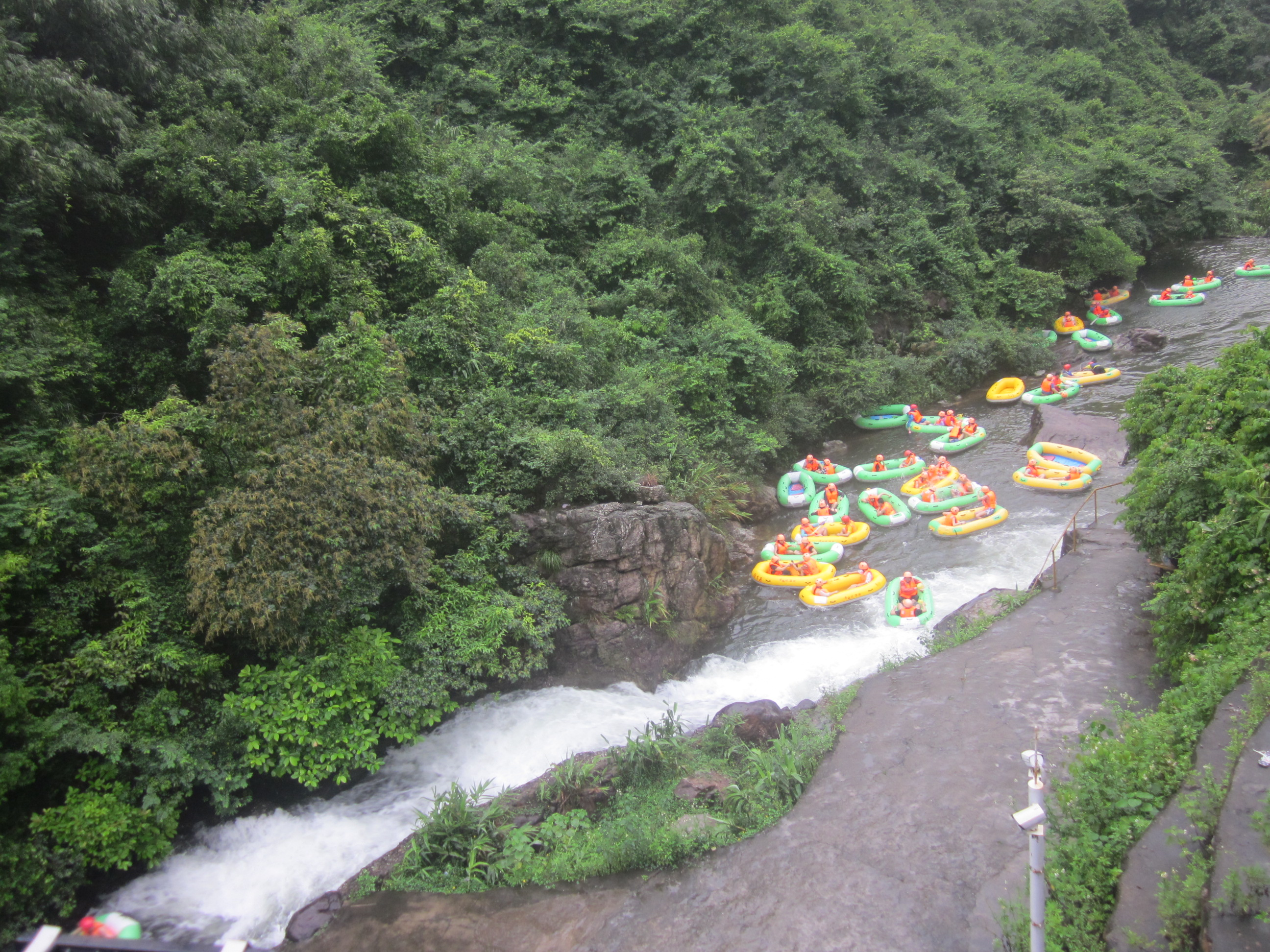
- Huangtengxia Drifting.

Highest point
- Elevation: 683 m (2,241 ft)
- Prominence: 683 m (2,241 ft)
- Coordinates: 23°46′10″N 113°06′06″E

Geography
- Location within Guangdong
- Country: China
- Province: Guangdong

Geology
- Rock type: Granite

Huangteng Gorge (simplified Chinese: 黄腾峡; traditional Chinese: 黃騰峽; pinyin: Huángténgxiá), also known as "little Jiuzhaigou" (小九寨沟), is located in Qingyuan Huangtengxia Eco-tourist Scenic Spots, Guangdong, China, with a height of 683 metres (2,241 ft) above sea level. It is rare in South China for more than 8 kilometres (5.0 mi) long calcified sight of the gorge and the rare and precious plants and animals.

== Tourism ==
The Huangtengxia Drifting (Chinese: 黄腾峡漂流), is a suitable for the exploration of leisure activities located in Huangteng Gorge.

== Image gallery ==
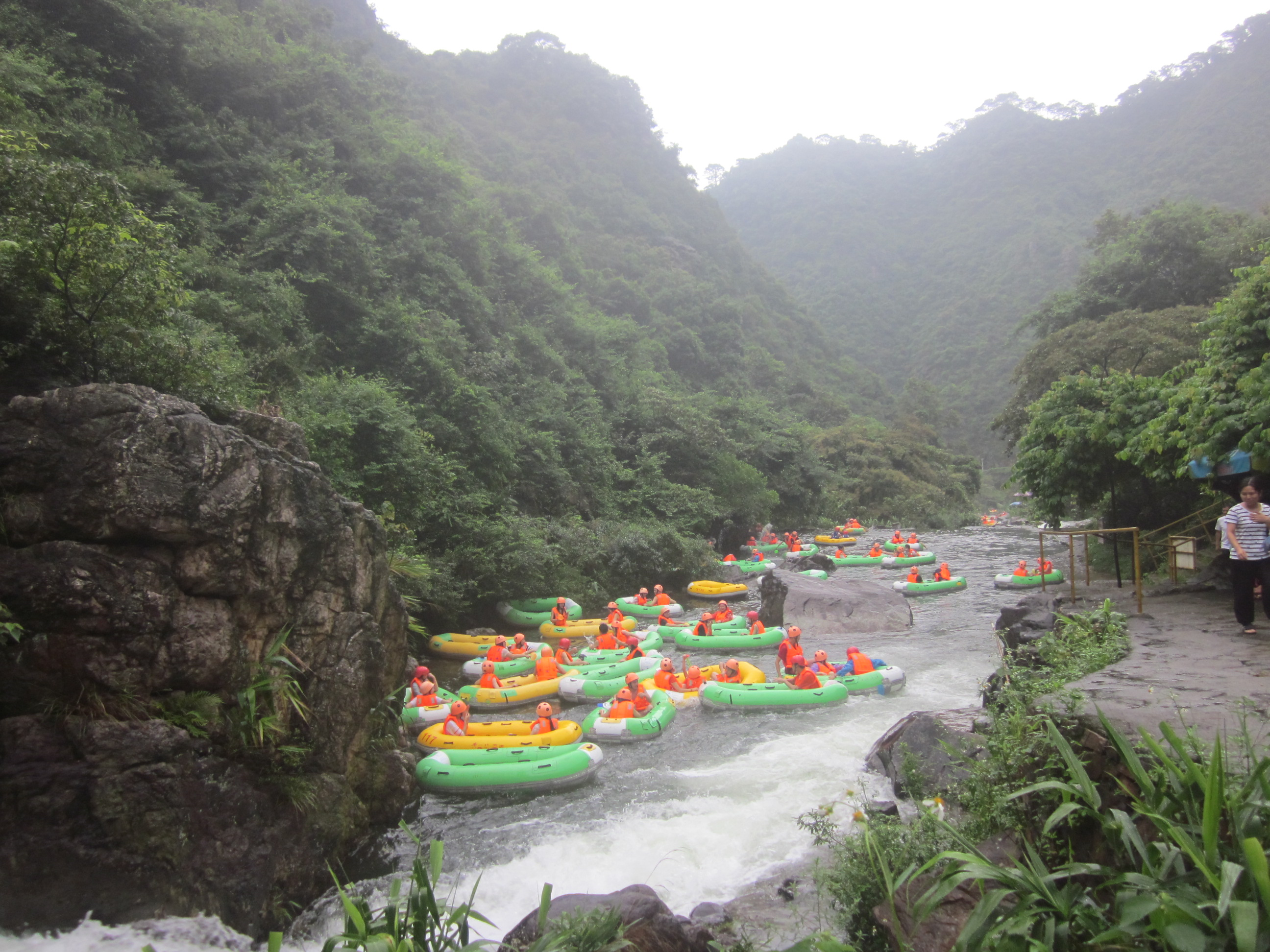
Huangtengxia Drifting.

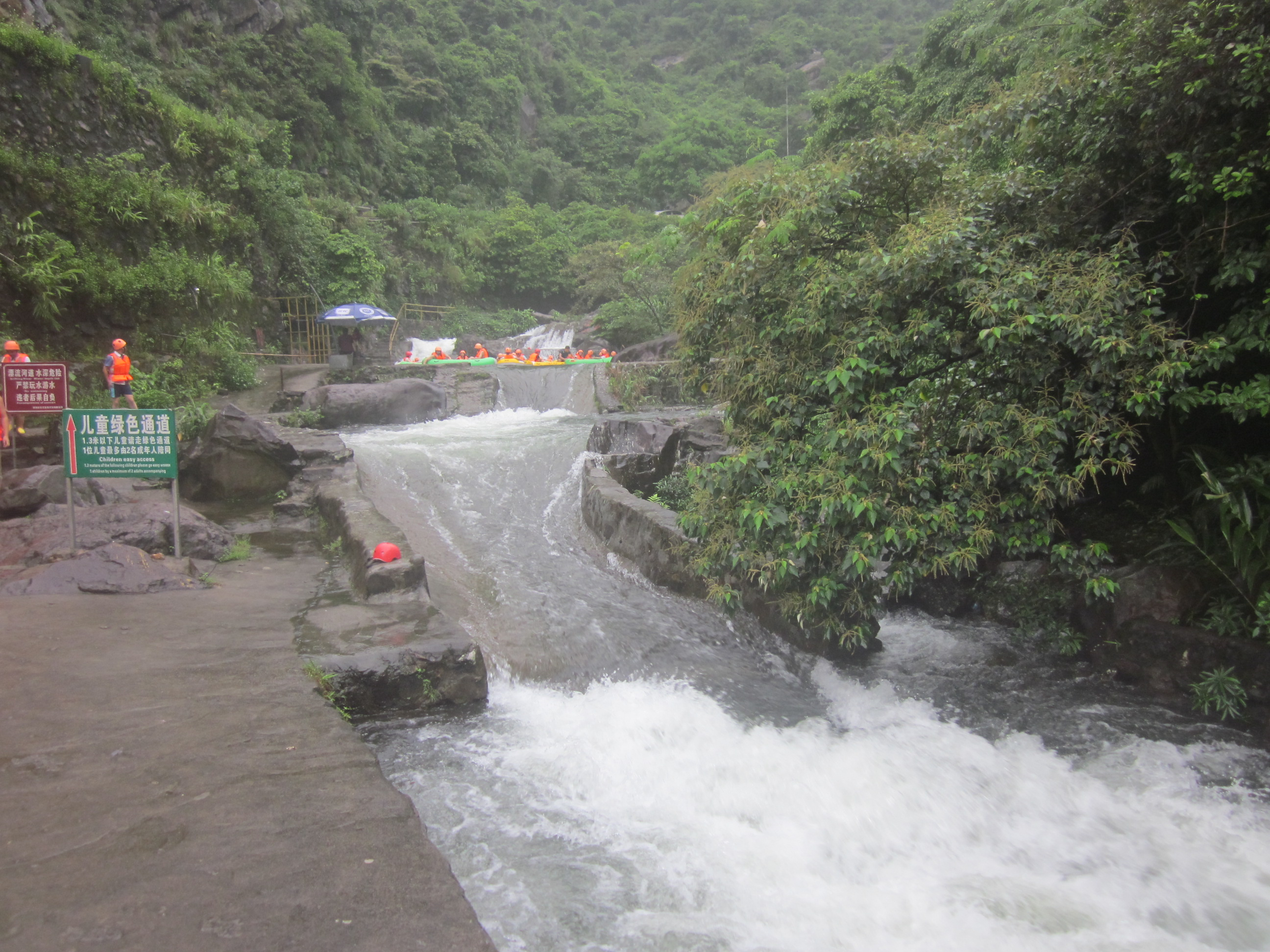
Huangtengxia Drifting.

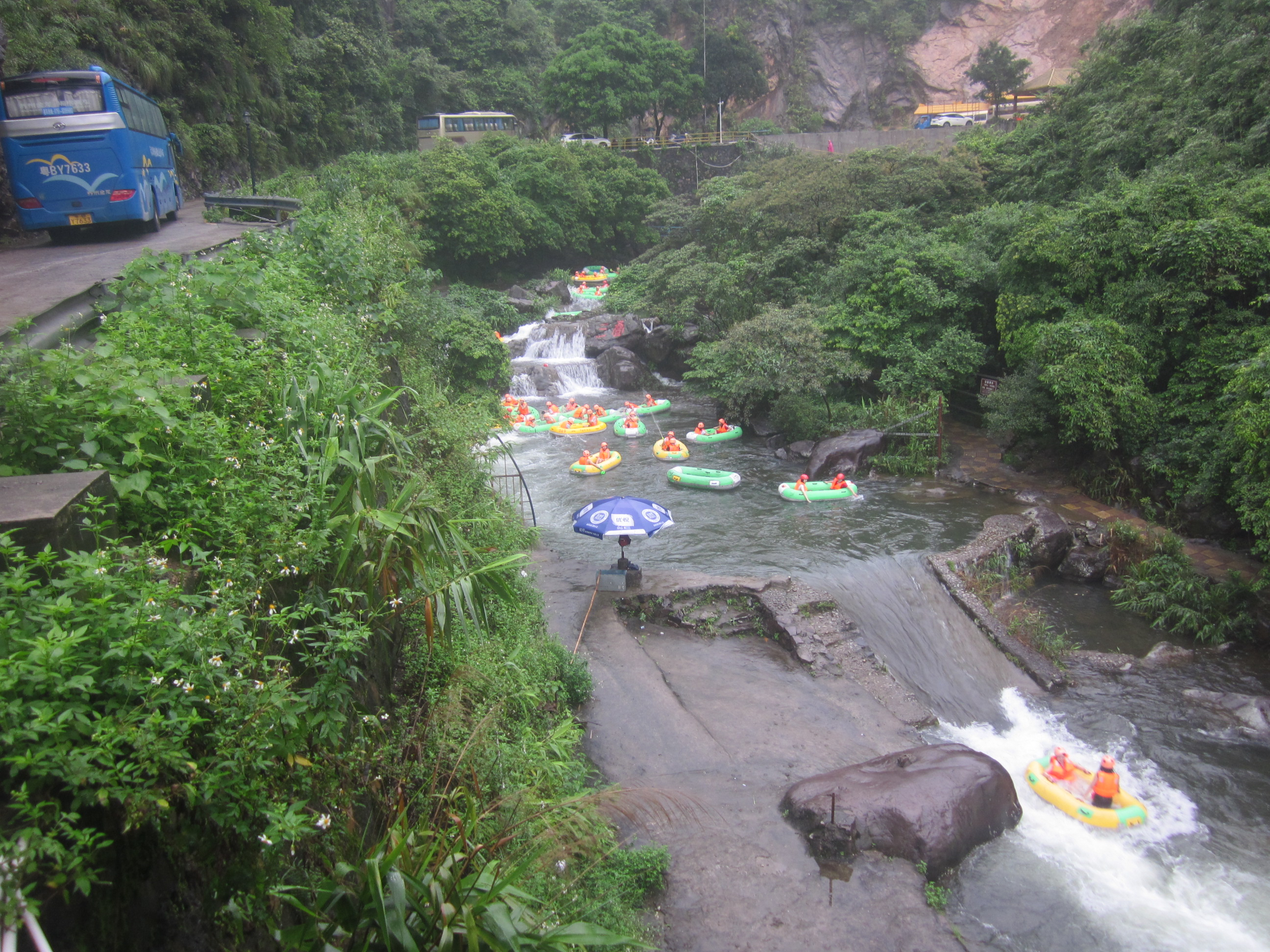
Huangtengxia Drifting.
