= Feilai Temple (Deqin County) =

Buddhist temple in Yunnan, China

- Tibetan transcription(s); Tibetan: ཇོ་བོ་ནམ་མཁའ་བཀྲ་ཤིས། Official transcription (China): 飞来寺
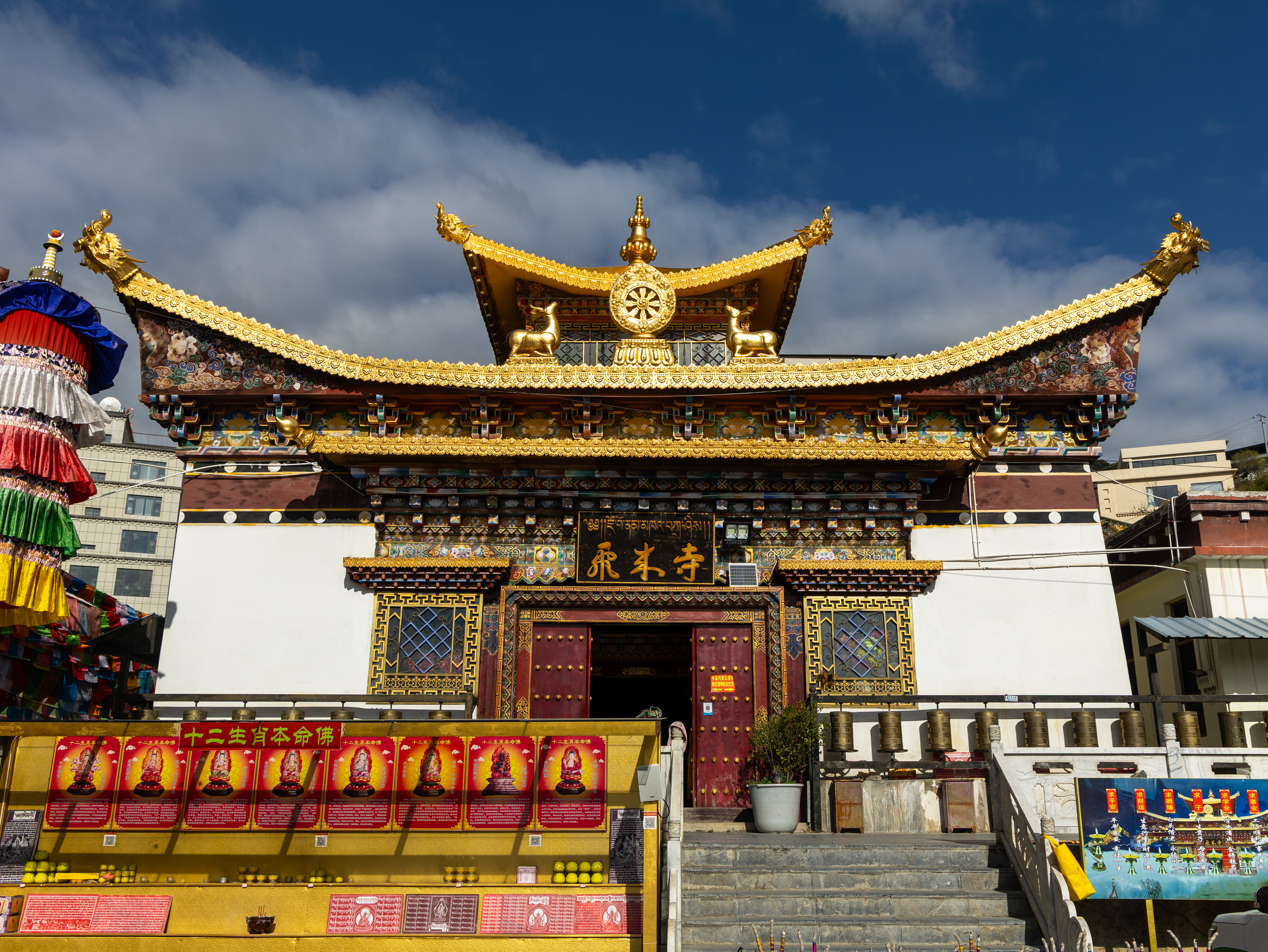
- Feilai Temple

- Location within Yunnan Location within China

Religion
- Affiliation: Tibetan Buddhism

Location
- Location: Dêqên County, Yunnan
- Country: China
- Interactive map of Feilai Temple
- Coordinates: 28°26′52″N 98°52′53″E

Architecture
- Style: Chinese architecture
- Established: 1614
- Completed: 1614

Feilai Temple (simplified Chinese: 飞来寺; traditional Chinese: 飛來寺; pinyin: Feīlaí Sì; Tibetan: ཇོ་བོ་ནམ་མཁའ་བཀྲ་ཤིས།) is a Buddhist temple located in Dêqên County, Yunnan, China.

== History ==
The original temple dates back to 1614, during the 17th century in the late Ming dynasty (1368–1644).

== Architecture ==
The existing main buildings include the Zisun Hall (子孙殿), Guansheng Hall (关圣殿; 'Hall of Saintly Emperor Guan'), Haichao Hall (海潮殿), wing-rooms, side rooms, and matching halls.

== Gallery ==
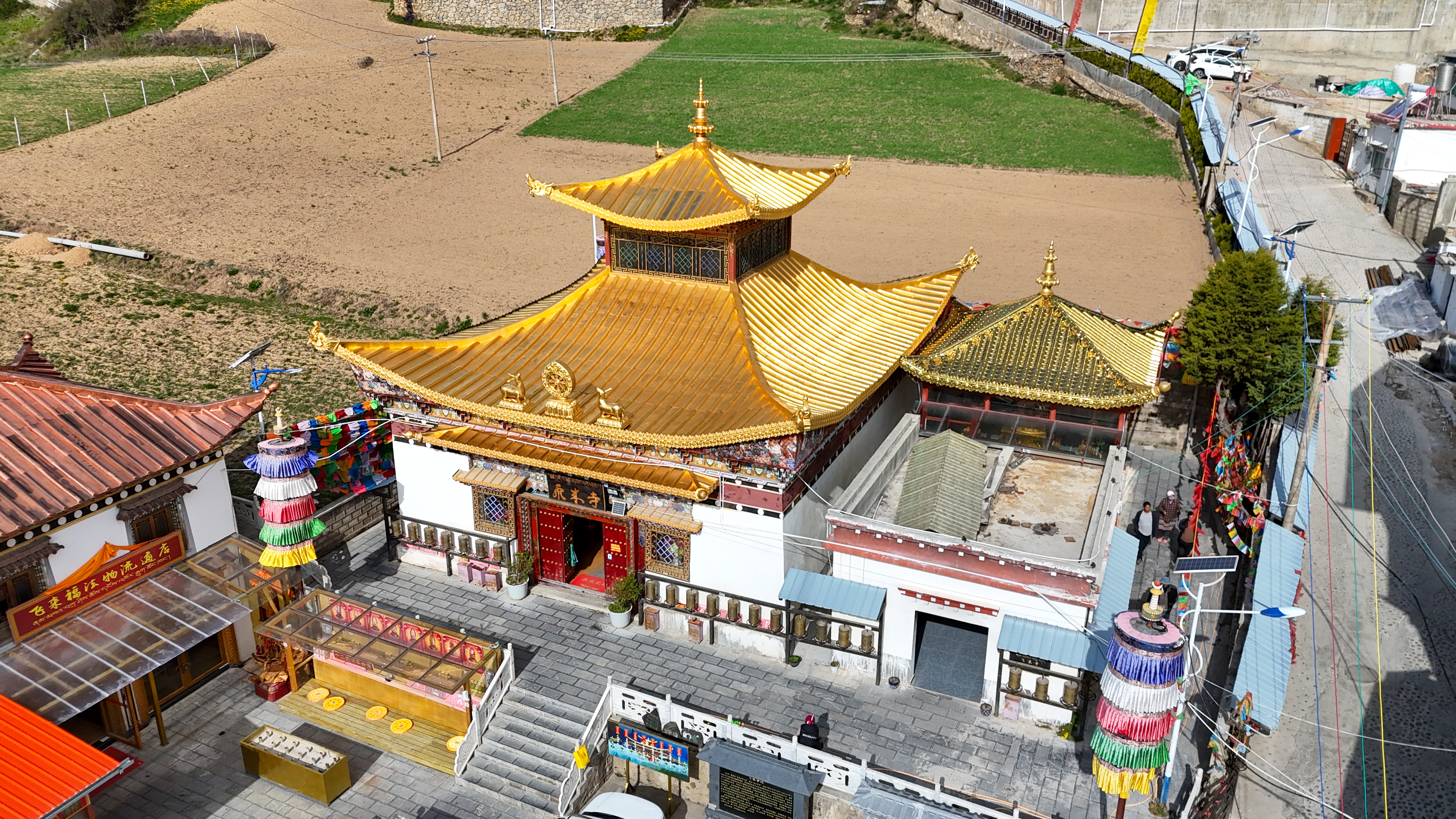
Aerial view

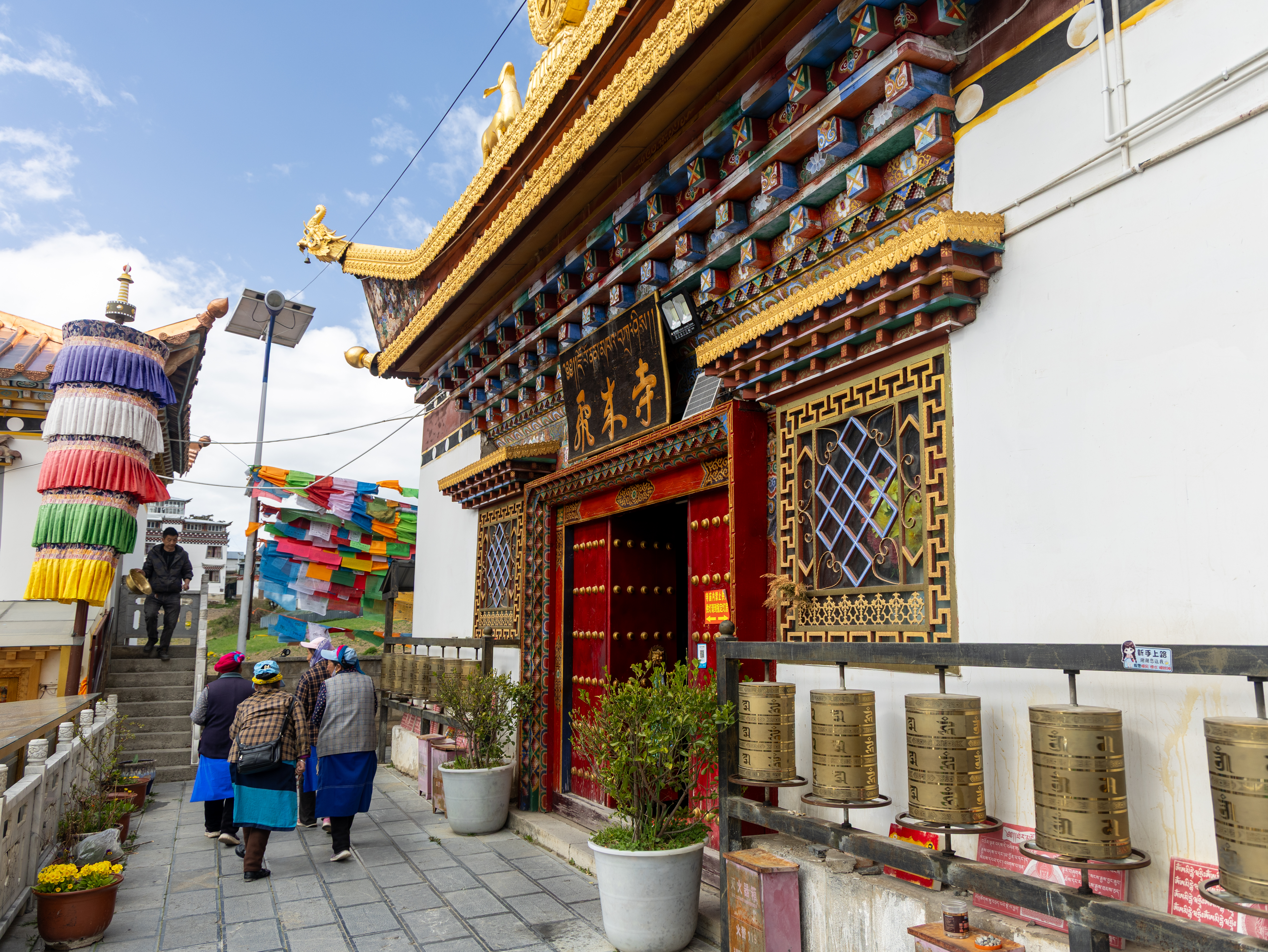
Ritual circumambulation at Feilai Temple

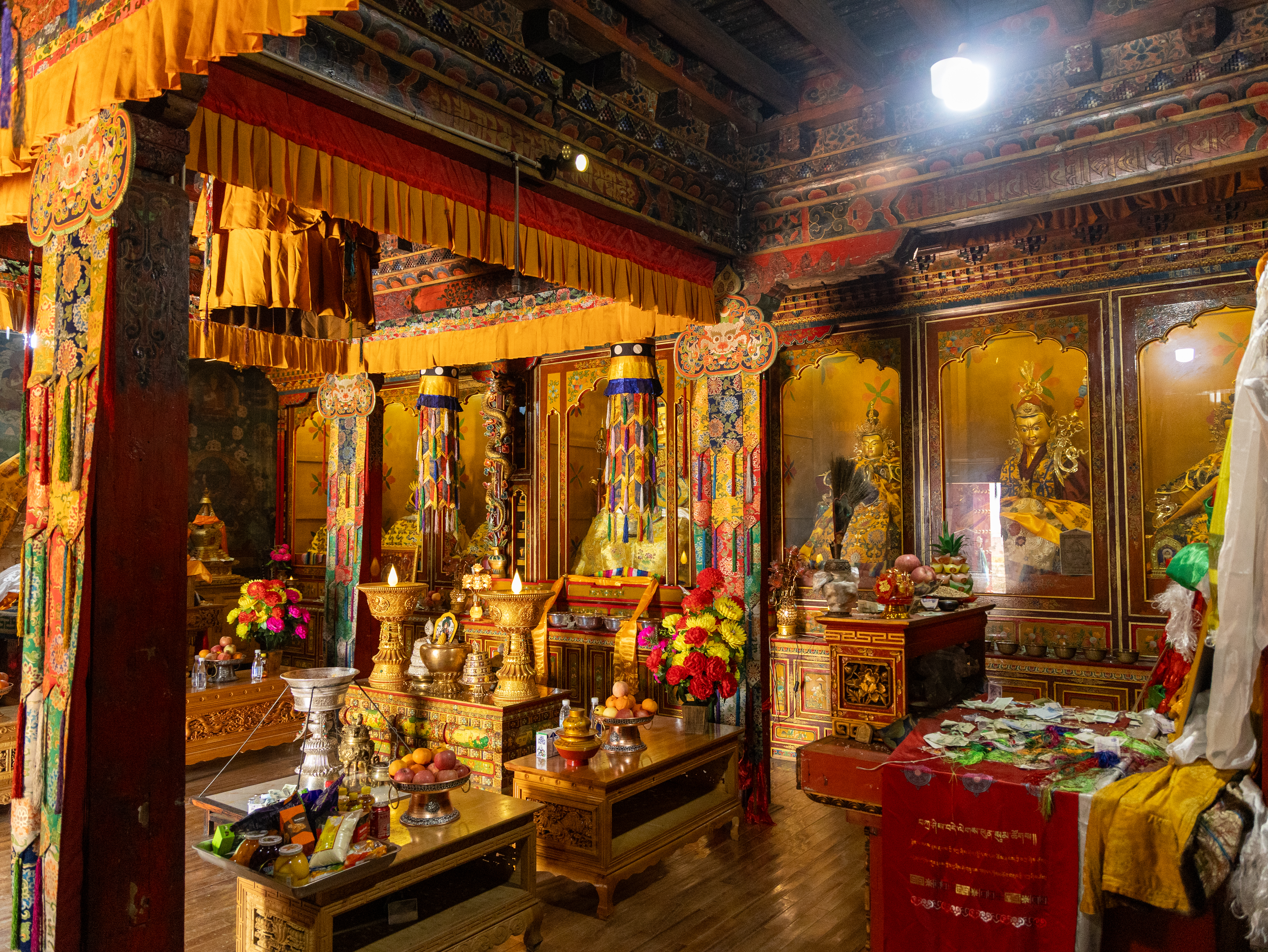
Interior

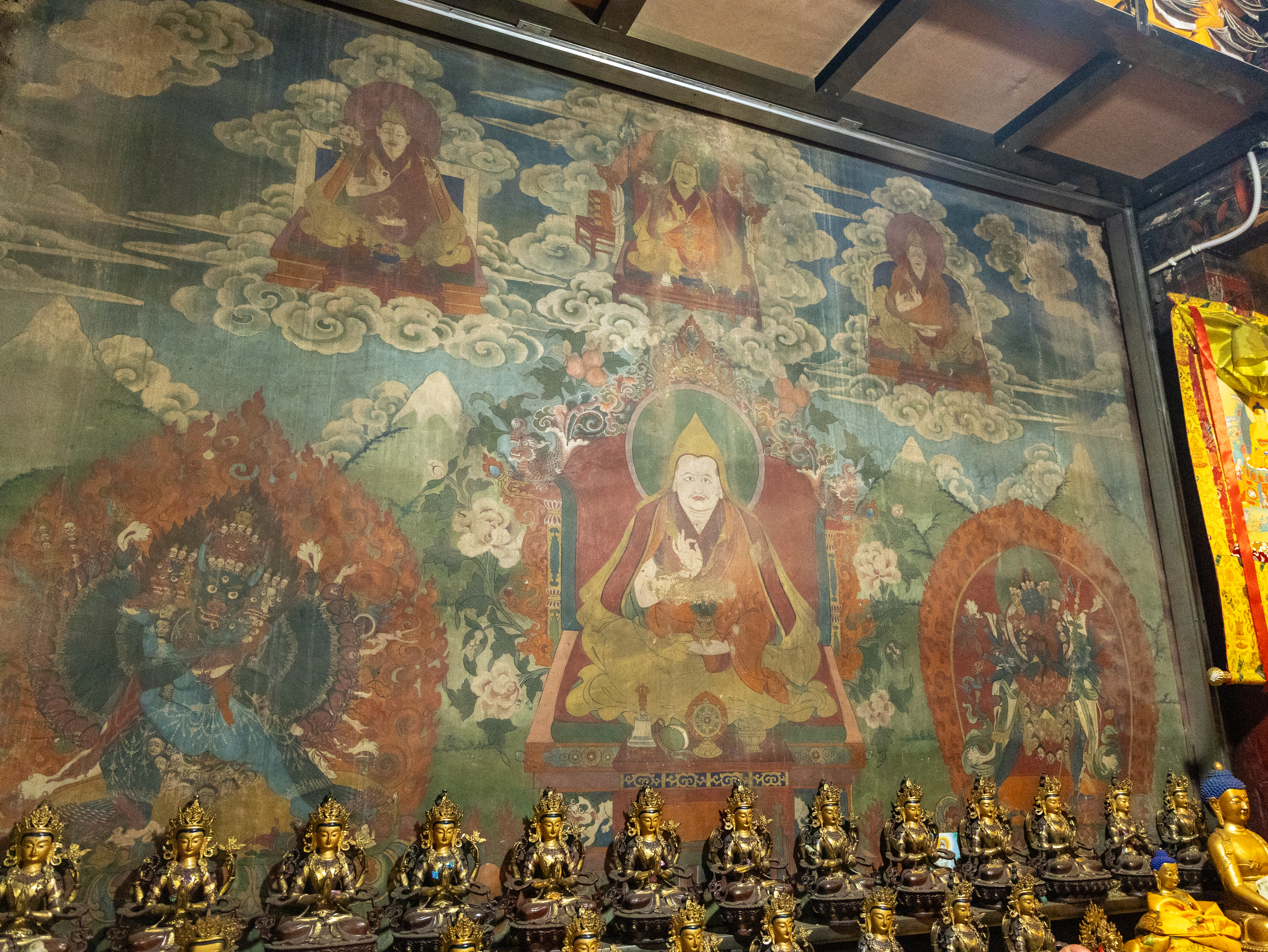
Buddhist murals drew in Qing dynasty

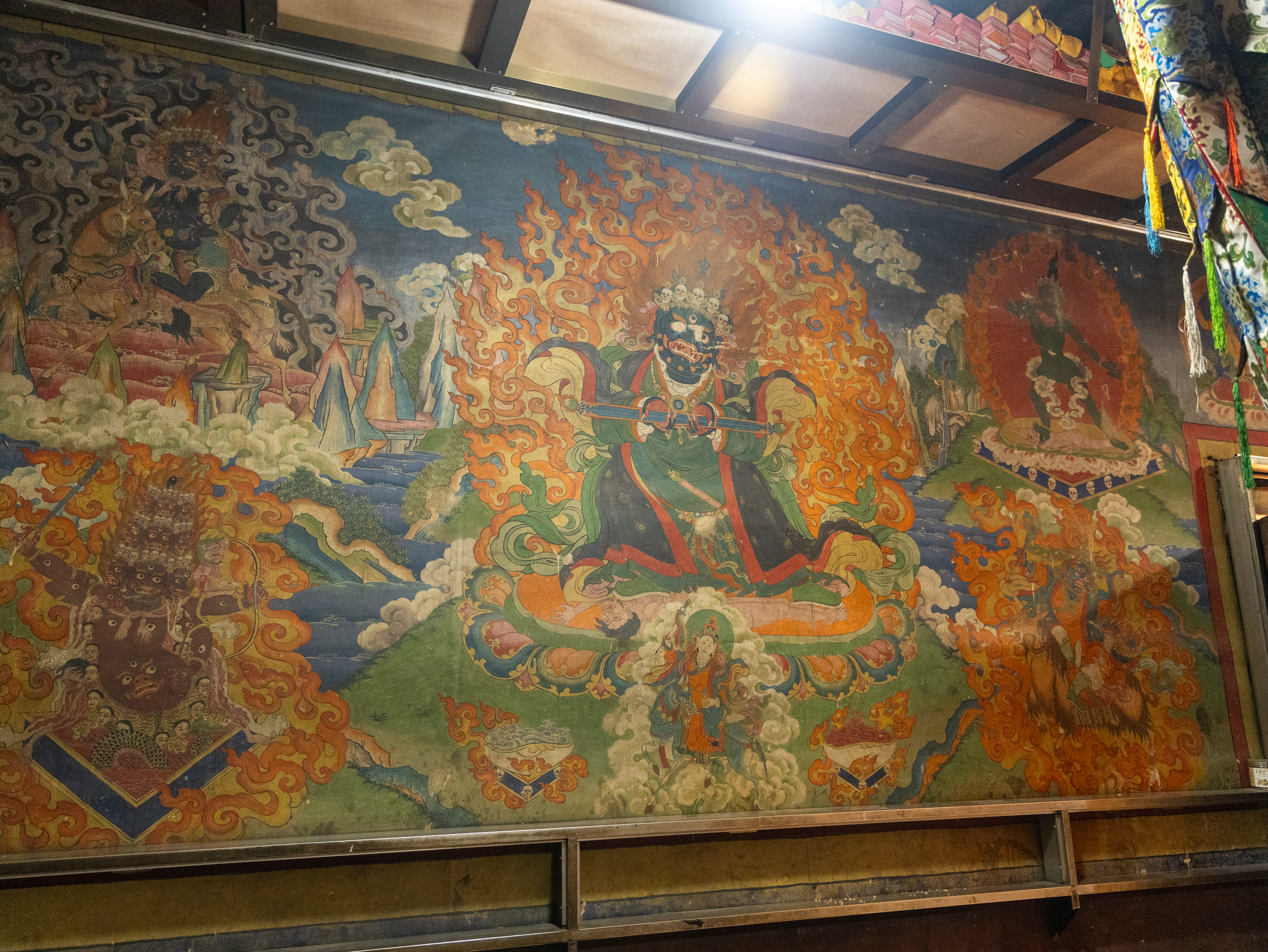
Buddhist murals drew in Qing dynasty

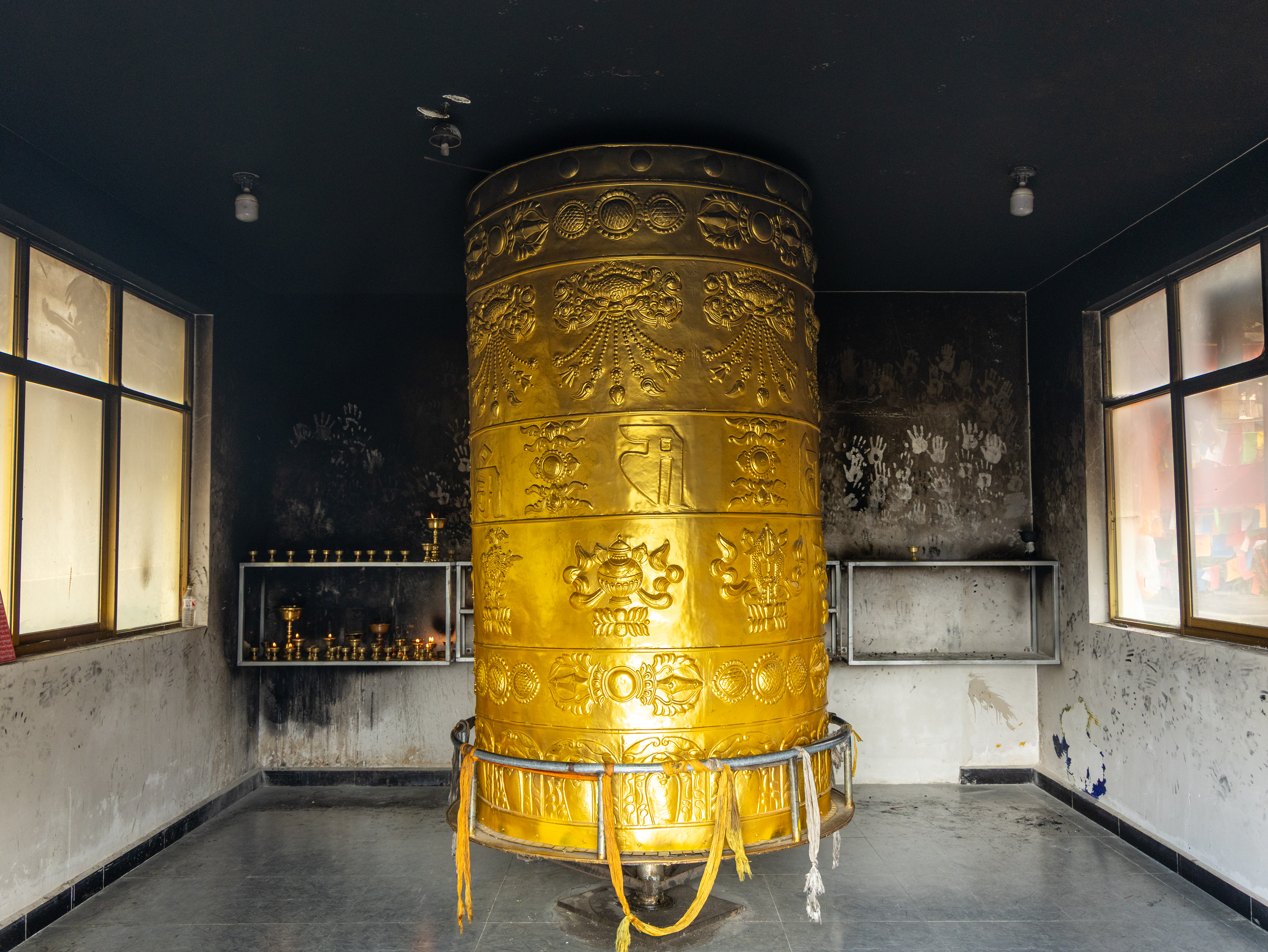
Prayer wheel

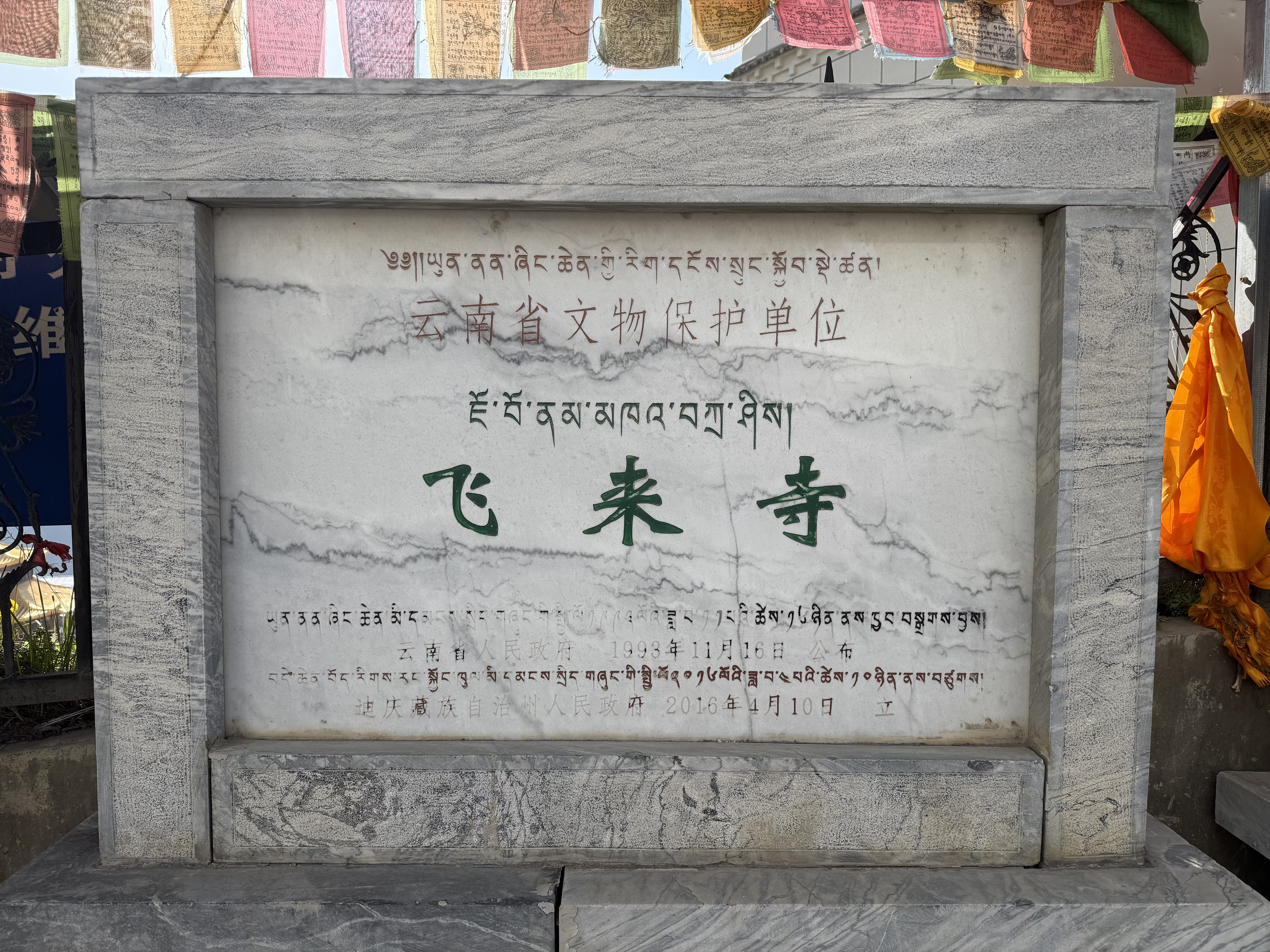
Sign of the Major Historical and Cultural Site
