= Feilai Temple (Qingyuan) =

Buddhist temple in Qingyuan, Guangdong, China

- 飞来寺
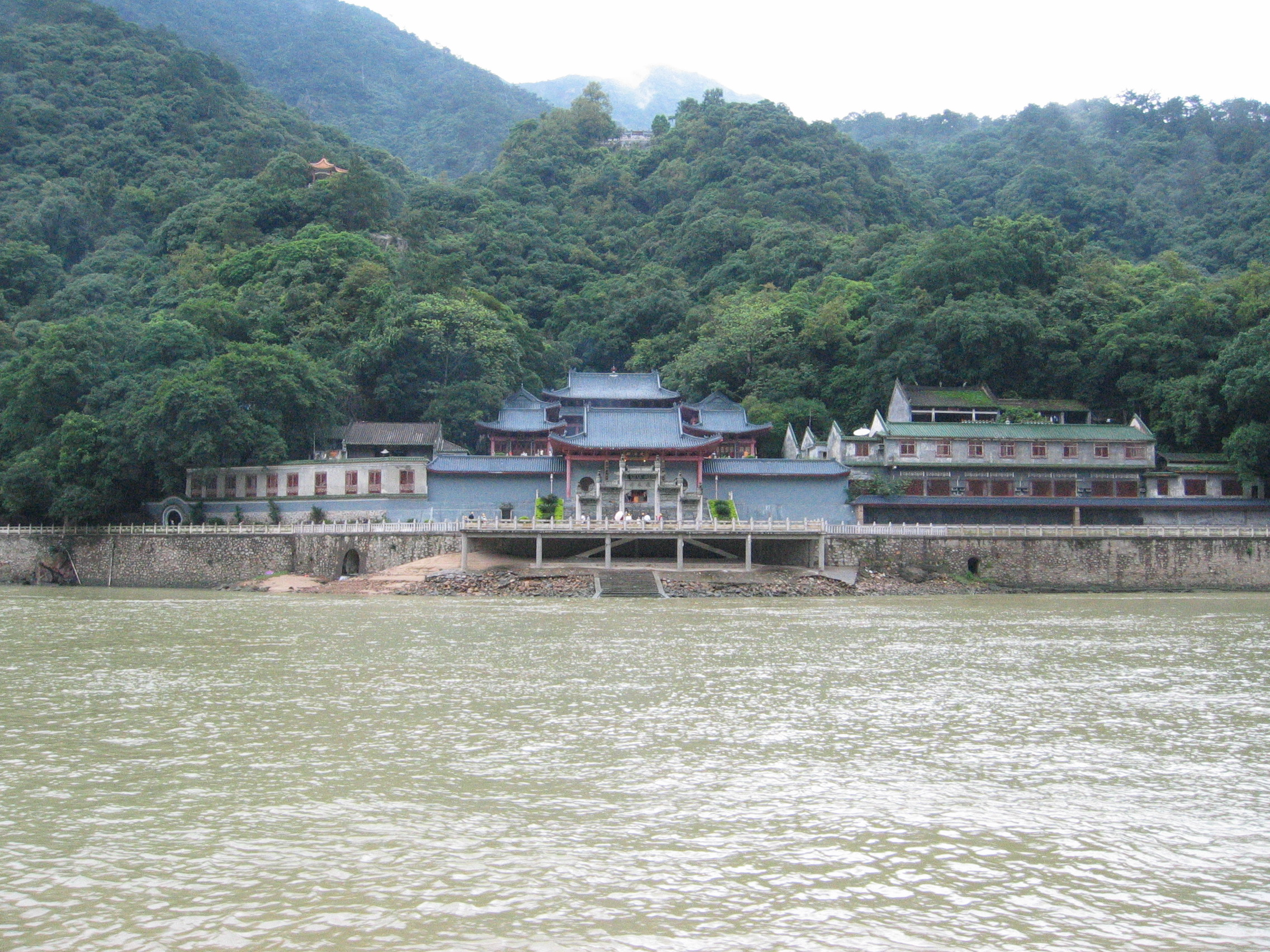
- The panorama of Feilai Temple.

- Location within Guangdong Location within China

Religion
- Affiliation: Buddhism
- Deity: Chan Buddhism

Location
- Location: Bank of the Bei River, Qingyuan, Guangdong
- Country: China
- Coordinates: 23°42′30″N 113°10′22″E

Architecture
- Founder: Zhenjun; Ling'ai
- Completed: AD 520

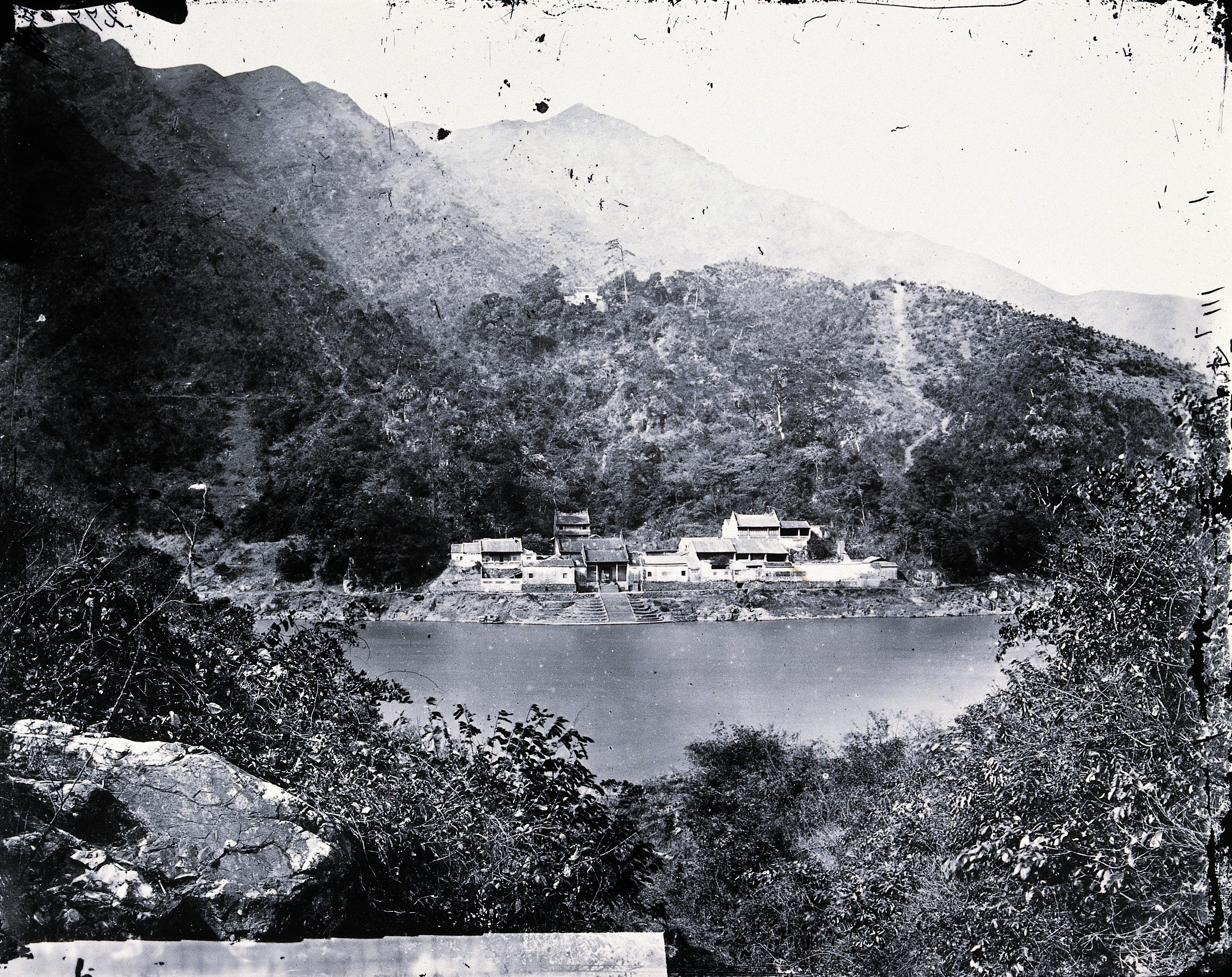
Feilai Temple photographed in the 1870s by John Thomson.

Feilai Temple (simplified Chinese: 飞来寺; traditional Chinese: 飛來寺; pinyin: Feīlaí Sì) is a Buddhist temple located on the bank of Bei River, in Qingyuan, Guangdong, China. Feilai Temple was originally built in 520, but because of natural disasters has been rebuilt numerous times since then. The present version was completed in June 2004. The temple has a construction area of 4,000 square metres (43,000 sq ft).

== Legend ==
A legendary and mysterious saying is that the Yellow Emperor had two sons Taiyu (太禺) and Zhongyang (仲阳), both of whom lived in seclusion at the foot of Feilai Gorge (飞来峡), beside the Bei River. One night, under the moonlight, they drinking and composing, and enjoying the beautiful scenery. However, they felt regretful that the scenery are natural landscape and the landscape types are a little simple. At once, they rode the cloud and mist to Yanzuo Temple (延祚寺), in Shuzhou (now Anqing), Anhui. They invited abbot Zhenjun to promote Buddhism. The Chan master nodded. So Taiyu and Zhongyang used their spells to move the temple to Feilai Gorge.

== History ==
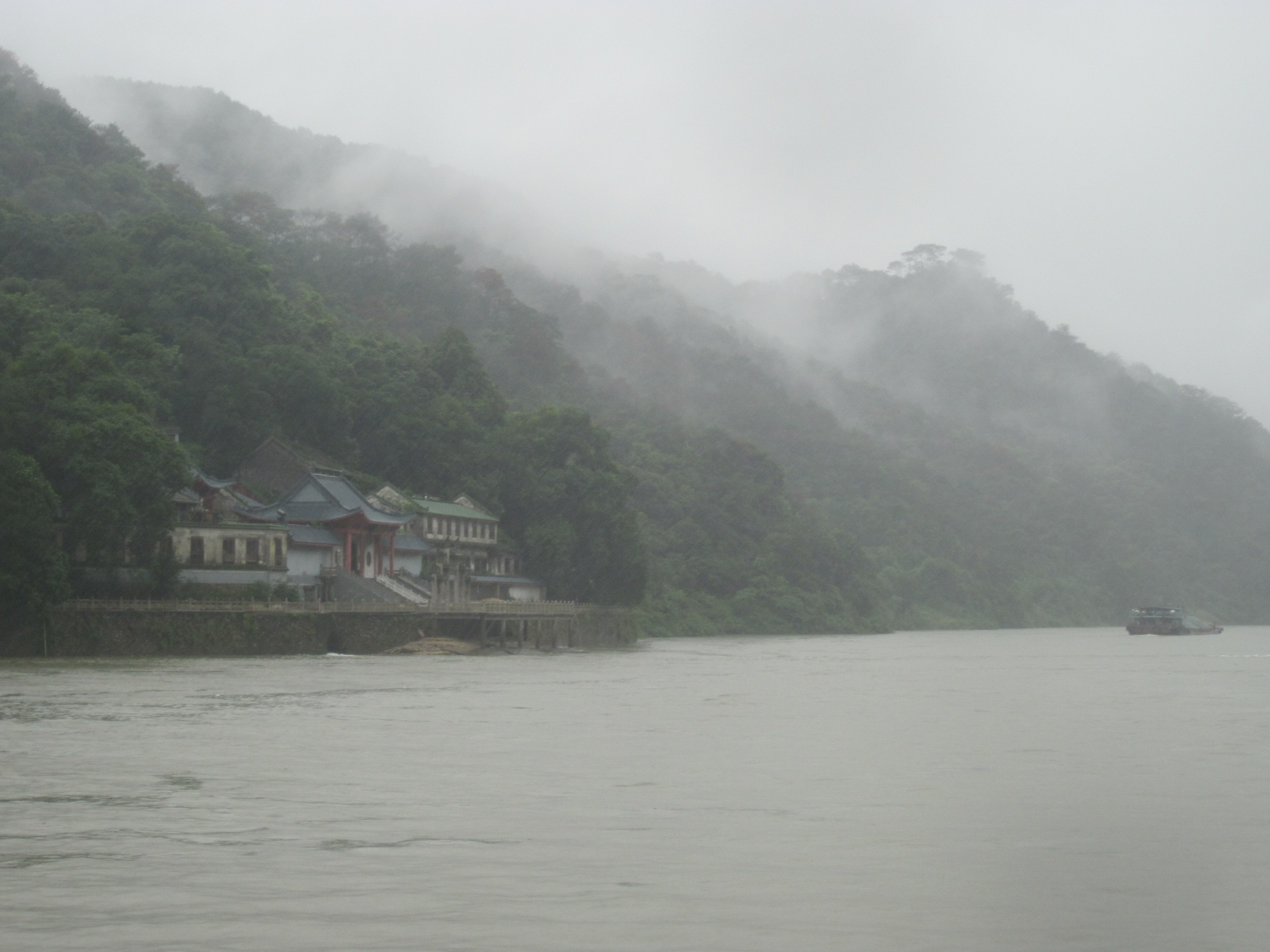
View of Feilai Temple from a boat.

Feilai Temple was first built in the 1st year of Period Putong (520) in the Liang dynasty (502–587) by Chan master Zhenjun (贞俊禅师) and Ling'ai (灵霭禅师). Emperor Wu (464–549) inscribed and honored the name “Zhide Temple” (至德寺). When Bodhidharma arrived in China, Emperor Wu, a devout Buddhist believer, immediately sent envoys to receive Bodhidharma to the capital Jiankang (now Nanjing) after he heard of his coming, Bodhidharma preached dharma at the temple when he moved north via here.

During the Sui dynasty (581–618), Sengcan, the Third Chinese Patriarch of Chan, once lived in here.

In 677, in the 2nd year of the age of Yifeng (676–679) of Emperor Gaozong, when Huineng (638–713), the Sixth and Last Patriarch of Chan, went from Guangzhou to Caoxi Baolin Temple (曹溪宝林寺) via Qingyuan, he preached Chan Buddhism in the temple. During the reign of Emperor Ruizong (662–716), its name was changed into "Feilai Chanju Temple" (飞来禅居寺), also known as "Guangqing Temple" (广庆寺) and "Xiashan Temple" (峡山寺).

According to Qingyuan County Annals, the Feilai Temple includes the following halls: the Guangqing Temple (广庆寺), the Feilai Temple (飞来禅寺), the Dizi Ancestral Hall (帝子祠), the Sixth Patriarch Hall (六祖殿), and the Guanyin Hall.

On November 18, 1978, it was designated as a county level key cultural unit. In 1987, it was listed as a provincial level key cultural heritage.

On May 8, 1997, Feilai Temple was destroyed with eleven mooks and nuns and two workers missing in floods and mudslides after torrential rains hit the South China.

Groundbreaking began on December 28, 1997, and finished on June 16, 2004.

== Architecture ==
- Mahavira Hall
- Drum tower
- Bell tower
- Mahaparinirvana Hall
- Abbot's Quarters
- Hall of Kshitigarbha
- Buddhist Texts Library
