= Guanyin (disambiguation) =

Guanyin is the Chinese/East Asian version of the bodhisattva Avalokiteśvara.

Guanyin may also refer to:

== Places ==
- Guanyin District, Taoyuan, Taiwan
- Guanyin Township, Gongcheng County, Guangxi, China
- Guanyin Subdistrict, Pengshan District, Meishan, Sichuan, China
- Guanyin Creek, a tributary of the Xiang River in Changsha, Hunan, China
- Guanyin Bridge, in Lushan, Jiangxi, China
- Guanyindong or Guanyin Cave, archaeological site in Qianxi County, Guizhou, China
- Xuzhou Guanyin International Airport, in Suining County, Jiangsu, China

=== Towns in China ===
- Guanyin, Hubei, in Yunxi County, Hubei
- Guanyin, Shaanxi, in Zhenba County, Shaanxi
- Guanyin, Dazhu County, Sichuan
- Guanyin, Yibin, Sichuan

== People ==
- Shen Wuhua (fl. 569–626), empress of the Chen dynasty, later became a Buddhist nun named Guanyin
- Xiao Guanyin (1040–1075), empress of the Liao dynasty

== Others ==
- Pachyosa guanyin, a species of beetle from Taiwan

== See also ==
- Mount Guanyin (disambiguation)
- Kanon (disambiguation)
