= Lianzhou (disambiguation) =

Lianzhou (连州) is a county-level city in Guangdong, China.

Lianzhou may also refer to:

- Lianzhou Township (莲洲乡), a township in Yongxin County, Jiangxi, China

== Towns in China ==
- Lianzhou, Lianzhou, in Lianzhou City
- Lianzhou, Luoding (连州), in Luoding, Guangdong
- Lianzhou, Zhuhai (莲洲), in Doumen District, Zhuhai, Guangdong
- Lianzhou, Guangxi (廉州), in Hepu County, Guangxi
- Lianzhou, Hebei (廉州), in Gaocheng, Hebei

== Historical prefectures ==
- Lian Prefecture (Guangdong) (連州), a prefecture between the 6th and 20th centuries in modern Guangdong, China
- Lian Prefecture (Guangxi) (廉州), a prefecture between the 7th and 13th centuries in modern Guangxi, China
