= Yangzhou (disambiguation) =

Yangzhou (扬州) is a modern prefecture-level city in Jiangsu, China.

Yangzhou may also refer to these places in China:

- Yangzhou Subdistrict (洋州街道), a subdistrict in Yang County, Shaanxi
- Yangzhou Township (杨洲乡), a township in Wuning County, Jiangxi

== Historical locations ==
- Yang Province (揚州), one of the Nine Provinces of ancient China
- Yang Prefecture (Jiangsu) (揚州), a former prefecture between the 6th and 20th centuries in modern Jiangsu
- Yang Prefecture (Shaanxi) (洋州), a former prefecture between the 6th and 14th centuries in modern Shaanxi

== See also ==
- Yang (disambiguation)
- Yang Zhou (born 1992), Chinese volleyball player
