= Liannan Yao Autonomous County =

Liannan 连南瑶族自治县
- County
- 连南瑶族自治县; Liannan Yao Autonomous County
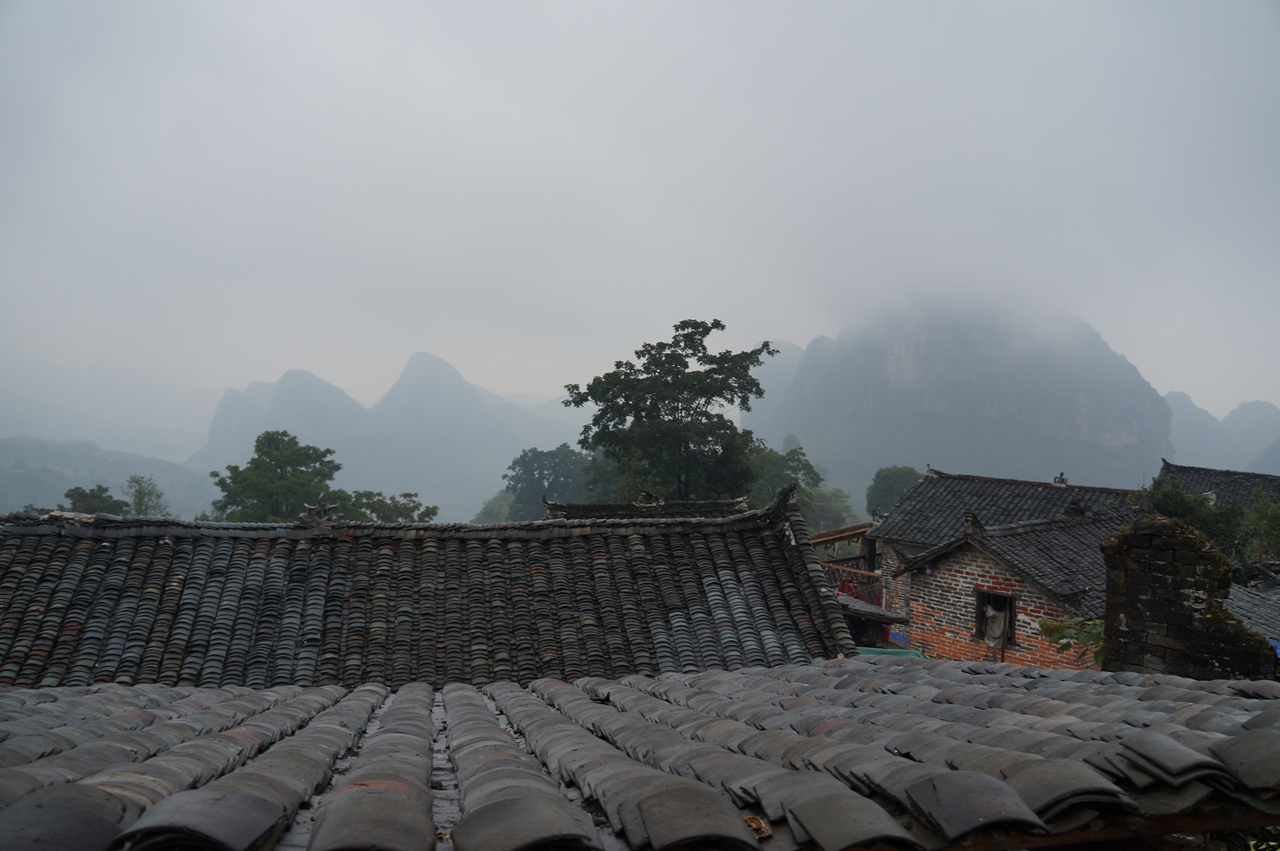
- Nangang Yao village in Liannan

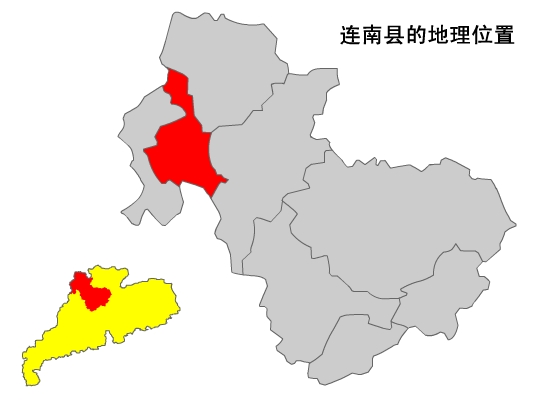
- Location in Qingyuan

- Location of the seat in Guangdong
- Coordinates: 24°35′N 112°16′E
- Country: People's Republic of China
- Province: Guangdong
- Prefecture-level city: Qingyuan
- County seat: Sanjiang

Area
  - Total: 1,231 km^{2} (475 sq mi)

Population (2020)
  - Total: 134,691
  - Density: 109.4/km^{2} (283.4/sq mi)
- Time zone: UTC+8 (China Standard)

Liannan Yao Autonomous County
- Traditional Chinese: 連南瑤族自治縣
- Simplified Chinese: 连南瑶族自治县
Transcriptions
Standard Mandarin
- Hanyu Pinyin: Liánnán Yáozú Zìzhìxiàn
- Wade–Giles: Lien-nan Yao-tsu Tzu-chih-hsien
Yue: Cantonese
- Yale Romanization: Lìhn Nàahm Yìuh Juhk Jih Jih Yuhn
- Jyutping: Lin4 naam4 iu4 zuk6 zi6 zi6 jyun2

Liannan Yao Autonomous County (postal: Linnam; simplified Chinese: 连南瑶族自治县; traditional Chinese: 連南瑤族自治縣; pinyin: Liánnán Yáozú Zìzhìxiàn) is located in the north of Guangdong province, China, and is part of Qingyuan prefecture-level city. It is one of Guangdong's three autonomous counties. More than half the population of the county is of Yao ethnicity.

== History ==
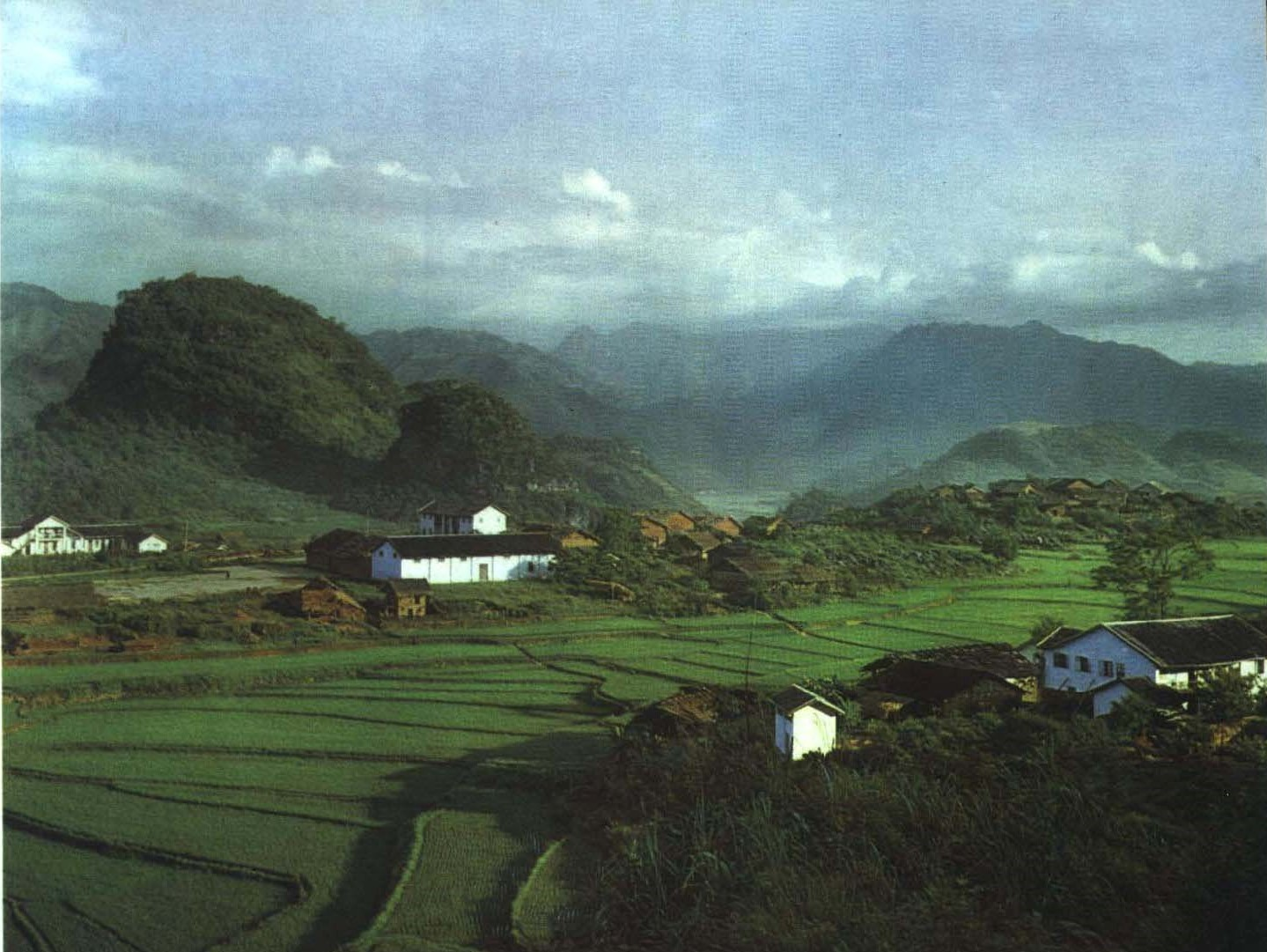
Liannan in 1964

The Yao people have inhabited the area that is the modern Liannan Yao Autonomous County since ancient times. Initially part of the Chu state during the Spring and Autumn period and Warring States period, it later fell under the administration of Changsha Commandery during the Qin dynasty and Guiyang Commandery during the Han dynasty. Later commanderies included Shixing, Yangshan and Xiping.In the Tang dynasty, the area was governed as part of the Lian Prefecture, until the Ming dynasty. The Qing dynasty incorporated traditional Yao leadership with the local governments and set up new administrative offices to manage the Yao-populated areas.

The Republic of China created Liannan County in 1946 as part of government reforms for minority areas, with Sanjiang as the county seat. In 1955 it was officially designated Liannan Yao Autonomous County. From 1958–1961, the region was merged with various neighboring counties, but eventually restored under Shaoguan Prefecture's government. Liannan was transferred to the jurisdiction of Qingyuan city in 1988.

== Geography ==
Liannan Yao Autonomous County borders Lianzhou to the northeast, Yangshan County to the southeast, Huaiji County to the south, Lianshan Zhuang and Yao Autonomous County to the west, and Jianghua Yao Autonomous County of Hunan to the northwest. The county covers a total area of 1,231 square kilometres, and administers 7 towns and 71 village (community) committees.

=== Climate ===
Climate data for Liannan, elevation 174 m (571 ft), (1991–2020 normals, extremes 1962–2020)
Month	Jan	Feb	Mar	Apr	May	Jun	Jul	Aug	Sep	Oct	Nov	Dec	Year
Record high °C (°F)	26.9 (80.4)	31.2 (88.2)	33.1 (91.6)	34.8 (94.6)	36.8 (98.2)	39.8 (103.6)	40.6 (105.1)	40.2 (104.4)	38.4 (101.1)	36.8 (98.2)	34.0 (93.2)	27.6 (81.7)	40.6 (105.1)
Mean daily maximum °C (°F)	13.8 (56.8)	16.6 (61.9)	19.2 (66.6)	24.5 (76.1)	28.7 (83.7)	31.4 (88.5)	33.7 (92.7)	33.7 (92.7)	31.3 (88.3)	27.0 (80.6)	21.7 (71.1)	15.5 (59.9)	24.8 (76.6)
Daily mean °C (°F)	9.4 (48.9)	12.0 (53.6)	15.1 (59.2)	19.9 (67.8)	24.1 (75.4)	26.7 (80.1)	28.2 (82.8)	27.9 (82.2)	25.9 (78.6)	21.5 (70.7)	16.4 (61.5)	10.6 (51.1)	19.8 (67.7)
Mean daily minimum °C (°F)	6.6 (43.9)	9.0 (48.2)	12.3 (54.1)	16.7 (62.1)	21.0 (69.8)	23.7 (74.7)	24.6 (76.3)	24.2 (75.6)	22.4 (72.3)	17.7 (63.9)	12.9 (55.2)	7.4 (45.3)	16.5 (61.8)
Record low °C (°F)	−4.8 (23.4)	−1.9 (28.6)	−0.3 (31.5)	5.8 (42.4)	11.0 (51.8)	16.4 (61.5)	19.6 (67.3)	20.4 (68.7)	14.8 (58.6)	6.9 (44.4)	1.2 (34.2)	−3.8 (25.2)	−4.8 (23.4)
Average precipitation mm (inches)	85.0 (3.35)	93.4 (3.68)	173.9 (6.85)	209.4 (8.24)	284.8 (11.21)	310.9 (12.24)	173.5 (6.83)	185.6 (7.31)	101.1 (3.98)	75.2 (2.96)	65.7 (2.59)	54.2 (2.13)	1,812.7 (71.37)
Average precipitation days (≥ 0.1 mm)	12.9	13.4	19.1	18.0	19.0	19.9	15.5	15.0	9.8	6.5	7.7	8.6	165.4
Average snowy days	0.6	0.3	0	0	0	0	0	0	0	0	0	0.4	1.3
Average relative humidity (%)	78	79	83	83	82	83	78	78	77	74	74	74	79
Mean monthly sunshine hours	72.5	58.6	52.4	72.6	106.3	127.8	191.0	191.8	164.6	158.1	128.0	112.3	1,436
Percentage possible sunshine	22	18	14	19	26	31	46	48	45	45	39	34	32
Source: China Meteorological Administrationall-time record low

== Economy ==
In 2024, Liannan recorded a gross domestic product (GDP) of ¥7.207 billion, an increase of 0.2% year on year. The primary, secondary and tertiary sectors contributed ¥1.35 billion (18.7%), ¥1.397 billion (19.4%) and ¥4.459 billion (61.9%) respectively. Per capita GDP reached ¥53,087, while fixed asset investment declined by 31.2%. General public budget revenue totaled ¥305 million, up 5.5%, though tax revenue fell to ¥81 million. Public budget expenditure was ¥2.269 billion, down 4.6%.

Agriculture and related industries grew modestly, with total output reaching ¥2.054 billion. Industrial value added above designated size increased by 3.7%, despite a contraction in construction activity. The tertiary sector dominated the economy, supported by tourism and foreign trade. Retail sales remained largely flat at ¥1.186 billion, while total imports and exports increased by 177.7%. Tourism recorded 474,400 visitors, generating ¥492 million in revenue. By the end of 2024, financial institution deposits stood at ¥6.666 billion and loans at ¥4.476 billion.

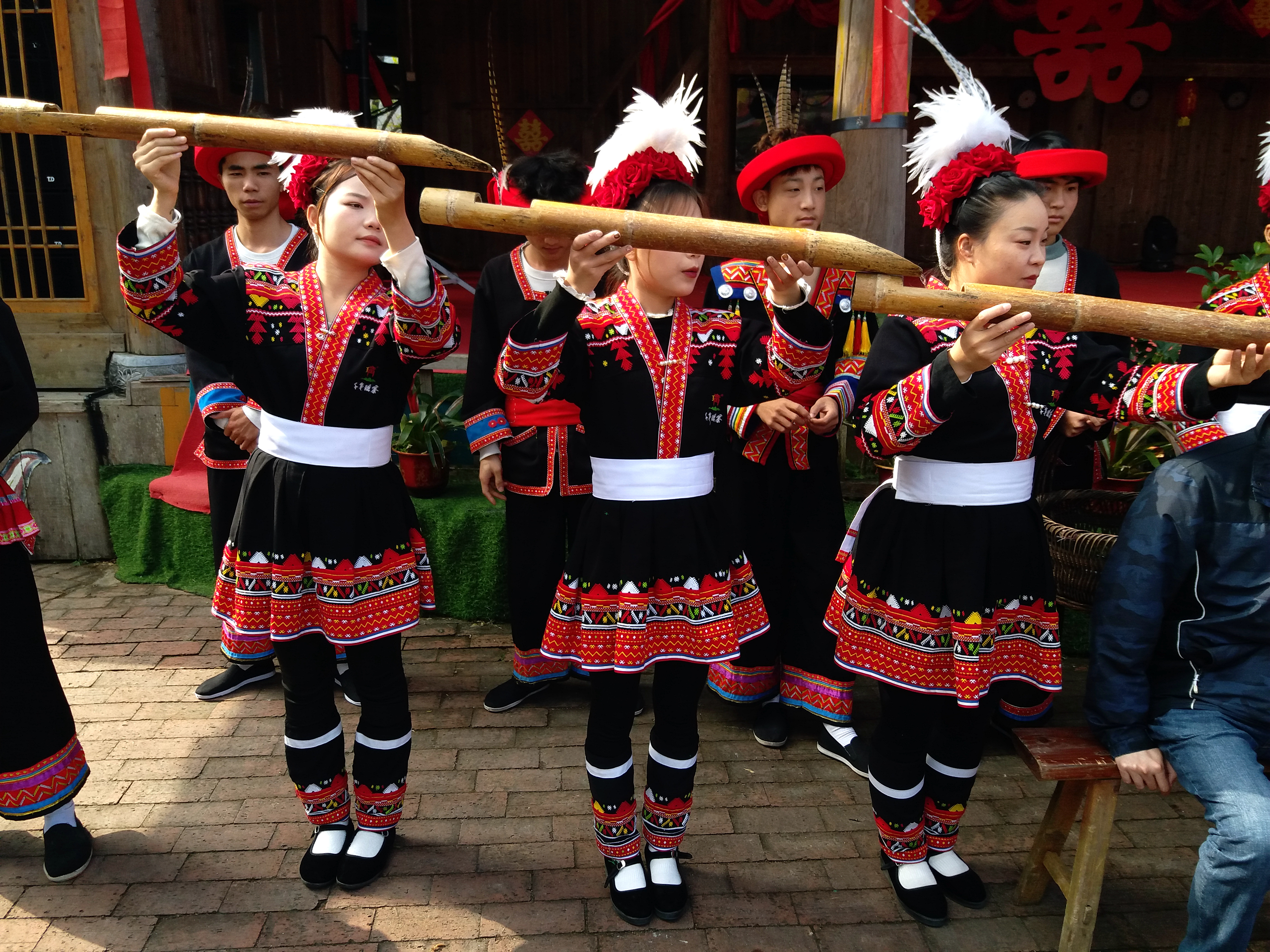
A performance of Yao ethnicity

== See also ==
- Autonomous entities of China
