= Dachi =

Dachi may refer to:

- Dachi, Fujian (大池镇), a town in Xinluo District, Longyan, Fujian, China
- Dachi, Iran, a village in Khuzestan Province, Iran
- Dachi, Shaanxi (大池镇), a town in Zhenba County, Shaanxi, China
- Dachi, Ukraine, an unincorporated settlement in Kherson Oblast, Ukraine
- Dachi of Iberia (reign 522–534)
- The rendaku form of karate stances (立ち)
- The rendaku form of tachi (太刀)
