= Mount Guanyin =

Mount Guanyin may refer to:

- Mount Guanyin (Dongguan), in China.
- Mount Guanyin (New Taipei), in Taiwan.

== See also ==
- Buddha Mountain, 2010 Chinese film whose Chinese name is translated to "Mount Guanyin"
- Gwaneumsan, a mountain in Pocheon, Gyeonggi, South Korea
