= Pachyosa itoi =

Scientific classification
- Domain: Eukaryota
- Kingdom: Animalia
- Phylum: Arthropoda
- Class: Insecta
- Order: Coleoptera
- Suborder: Polyphaga
- Infraorder: Cucujiformia
- Family: Cerambycidae
- Genus: Pachyosa
- Species: P. itoi

Binomial name
- Pachyosa itoi (Ohbayashi, 1985)

Synonyms
- Mesosa itoi N. Ohbayashi, 1985

Species of beetle

Pachyosa itoi is a species of beetle in the family Cerambycidae. It was described by Ohbayashi in 1985. It is known from Japan.
