= Huangchuan Three Gorges =

Huangchuan is an ancient name for Lianjiang River. The river rises in Hongyan Mountain of Xingzi Town. It flows through Lianzhou, Yangshan, Yingde and finally merges with the Beijiang River at the mouth of Liangjiang River. The crystal clear and unpolluted water flows very swiftly. From the Hongyan Mountain to the mouth of Lianjiang River, the river meanders over 180 kilometers. The most impressive section of the river is three Lianjiang River gorges: the sheep jump gorge, the fairy gorge and Leng cangue gorge, collectively known as Huangchuan Three Gorges. Huangchuan Three Gorges are 25 kilometers length, and they resemble the difficulty of access of the Three Gorges on the Yangtze River as well as the grace of Lijiang in Guilin.Now, the travel service of Lianzhou have placed the pleasure-boat here, and conducts sightseeing tour.

== Popular attractions ==
=== Yangtiao Gorge ===
The shortest gorge in Lianjiang River. Its length is less than a kilometer, and the width of the shore only 30 meters. Frightened sheep can jump over this gorge. In the legend have a goat living on the right side of the river, it must be to the left of the mountain to eat grass every day. One day, when it skip the gorges, with a loud noise, cliff cave that the goat can't go home again. So it stood on the left side of the hill every day, year after year it turned into a statue of stone. It is said that have a stone which like a goat on the left side of the mountain. So here is called the Yangtiao Gorge.

=== The Fairy Gorge ===
In the legend, one day seven fairy saw the scenery in Huangchuan Three Gorges is very beautiful, so they play down on July 7 day. All of a sudden, a strange wind blew and swept away six fairy, leave the smallest fairy to weep over in the river. The fairy Gorge river are the tears of the smallest fairy. "The Fairy Gorge" hence the name.

=== Lengjia Gorge ===
Lengjia Gorge is famous for its craggy. The gorge is the throat of Lianjiang River, the current is swift. According to history record, the southern song dynasty jia tai two years (1202) in May, Lianzhou City flood, after that Lengjia Gorge river were choked up with silt. Eighteen years later, Yang Rong as Lianzhou City's chief executive, his efforts to control water disasters. After three years of efforts, people finally cleared Lengjia Gorge river silt. In order to commemorate the one thing that people left in the Lengjia Gorge walls "楞枷古峡" this four characters.

=== The Ancient Stage ===
The Ancient Stage lies between Lengjia Gorge and Yangtiao Gorge. Walk along the Lianjiang River, you can see a natural big stage in the rock near the river. It is said that after cleaned the silt of Lengjia Gorge river, people gathered here to use the natural stage singing opera celebration, passing ships stopped to watch. Later, it gradually become boats resting place.
