= Pachyosa =

Scientific classification
- Domain: Eukaryota
- Kingdom: Animalia
- Phylum: Arthropoda
- Class: Insecta
- Order: Coleoptera
- Suborder: Polyphaga
- Infraorder: Cucujiformia
- Family: Cerambycidae
- Tribe: Mesosini
- Genus: Pachyosa

Genus of beetles

Pachyosa is a genus of longhorn beetles of the subfamily Lamiinae, containing the following species:

- Pachyosa atronotata (Kusama & Irie, 1976)
- Pachyosa cervinopicta Fairmaire, 1897
- Pachyosa guanyin Yamasako & Chou, 2014
- Pachyosa hirtiventris (Gressitt, 1937)
- Pachyosa itoi (Ohbayashi, 1985)
- Pachyosa kojimai (Hayashi, 1974)
