= Lian River (Bei River tributary) =

River in Guangdong, China

Coordinates: 24°02′39″N 113°18′12″E

The Lianjiang River (Chinese: 连江), in ancient time known as Huang River (Chinese: 湟水), is a right-bank and the largest tributary of the North River in Guangdong. The river rises in Momianshi (磨面石) of Xingzi Town (星子镇) in Lianzhou county, and it runs generally northwest to southeast through Lianzhou, Yangshan and Yingde counties. It joins the Bei River at Jiangkouzui of Lianjiangkou Town (连江口镇), Yingde. The Lianjiang River has a length of 275 kilometres (171 mi), with its tributaries; it has a drainage basin area of 10,061 square kilometres (3,885 sq mi).
