= Pachyosa atronotata =

Scientific classification
- Domain: Eukaryota
- Kingdom: Animalia
- Phylum: Arthropoda
- Class: Insecta
- Order: Coleoptera
- Suborder: Polyphaga
- Infraorder: Cucujiformia
- Family: Cerambycidae
- Genus: Pachyosa
- Species: P. atronotata

Binomial name
- Pachyosa atronotata (Kusama & Irie, 1976)

Synonyms
- Mesosa atronotata Kusama & Irie, 1976

Species of beetle

Pachyosa atronotata is a species of beetle in the family Cerambycidae. It was described by Kusama and Irie in 1976. It is known from Japan.

== Subspecies ==
- Pachyosa atronotata atronotata (Kusama & Irie, 1976)
- Pachyosa atronotata yamawakii (Hayashi, 1976)
