= Pachyosa cervinopicta =

Scientific classification
- Kingdom: Animalia
- Phylum: Arthropoda
- Class: Insecta
- Order: Coleoptera
- Suborder: Polyphaga
- Infraorder: Cucujiformia
- Family: Cerambycidae
- Genus: Pachyosa
- Species: P. cervinopicta

Binomial name
- Pachyosa cervinopicta Fairmaire, 1897

Synonyms
- Mesosa (Saimia) cervinopicta (Fairmaire) Breuning, 1938

Species of beetle

Pachyosa cervinopicta is a species of beetle in the family Cerambycidae. It was described by Léon Fairmaire in 1897. It is known from Japan.
