= Sanjiang, Liannan County =

Sanjiang 三江镇
- Town
- Location in Guangdong
- Coordinates: 24°43′24″N 112°17′09″E
- Country: People's Republic of China
- Province: Guangdong
- Prefecture-level city: Qingyuan
- Autonomous county: Liannan
- Village-level divisions: 1 residential community 10 villages
- Elevation: 123 m (404 ft)
- Time zone: UTC+8 (China Standard)
- Area code: 0763

Sanjiang (Chinese: 三江; pinyin: Sānjiāng; lit. 'three rivers') is a town in and the seat of Liannan Yao Autonomous County, in northwestern Guangdong province, China, and is served by China National Highway 323. As of 2011, it has one residential community (居委会) and 10 villages under its administration.

== See also ==
- List of township-level divisions of Guangdong
