= Yang Prefecture (Shaanxi) =

Historical administrative division in Shaanxi, China

Yangzhou or Yang Prefecture (洋州) was a zhou (prefecture) in imperial China, centering on modern Yang County, Shaanxi, China. It existed (intermittently) from the 6th century until 1370. During the short-lived Later Shu (934–965) it was known as Yuan Prefecture (源州).

== Geography ==
The administrative region of Yang Prefecture in the Tang dynasty is under the administration of modern Hanzhong in southwestern Shaanxi. It probably includes parts of modern:

- Yang County
- Xixiang County
- Zhenba County
- Foping County

== Population ==
In the early 1100s during the Song dynasty, there were 45,490 households and 98,567 people.

== See also ==
- Yangchuan Commandery
