= Maoping, Yang County =

Maoping 茅坪镇
- Town
- Location in China
- Coordinates: 33°26′11″N 107°40′48″E
- Country: People's Republic of China
- Province: Shaanxi
- Prefecture-level city: Hanzhong
- County: Yang County
- Time zone: UTC+8 (China Standard)

Maoping (Chinese: 茅坪; pinyin: Máopíng) is a town under the administration of Yang County, Shaanxi, China. As of 2018, it has 6 villages under its administration.
