= Pachyosa kojimai =

Scientific classification
- Kingdom: Animalia
- Phylum: Arthropoda
- Class: Insecta
- Order: Coleoptera
- Suborder: Polyphaga
- Infraorder: Cucujiformia
- Family: Cerambycidae
- Genus: Pachyosa
- Species: P. kojimai

Binomial name
- Pachyosa kojimai (Hayashi, 1974)

Synonyms
- Mesosa kojimai Hayashi, 1974

Species of beetle

Pachyosa kojimai is a species of beetle in the family Cerambycidae. It was described by Masao Hayashi in 1974. It is known from Taiwan and Japan.
