= Pachyosa hirtiventris =

Scientific classification
- Domain: Eukaryota
- Kingdom: Animalia
- Phylum: Arthropoda
- Class: Insecta
- Order: Coleoptera
- Suborder: Polyphaga
- Infraorder: Cucujiformia
- Family: Cerambycidae
- Genus: Pachyosa
- Species: P. hirtiventris

Binomial name
- Pachyosa hirtiventris (Gressitt, 1937)

Synonyms
- Coptops hirtiventris Gressitt, 1937; Mesosa hirtiventris (Gressitt) Breuning, 1938; Coptops japonica (Breuning) Breuning, 1939

Species of beetle

Pachyosa hirtiventris is a species of beetle in the family Cerambycidae. It was described by Gressitt in 1937, originally under the genus Coptops. It is known from Japan.
