= Yangzhou Subdistrict =

Yangzhou Subdistrict 洋州街道
- Subdistrict
- Location in China
- Coordinates: 33°13′40″N 107°32′44″E
- Country: People's Republic of China
- Province: Shaanxi
- Prefecture-level city: Hanzhong
- County: Yang County
- Time zone: UTC+8 (China Standard)

Yangzhou Subdistrict (Chinese: 洋州街道; pinyin: Báilù Jiēdào) is a subdistrict in Yang County, Shaanxi, China. As of 2018, it has nine residential communities and 10 villages under its administration.

== See also ==
- List of township-level divisions of Shaanxi
