= Guanyin Township =

Guanyin Township 观音乡
- Township
- Location in Guangxi
- Coordinates: 25°11′0″N 110°57′50″E
- Country: People's Republic of China
- Autonomous region: Guangxi Zhuang Autonomous Region
- Prefecture-level city: Guilin
- Autonomous county: Gongcheng Yao Autonomous County
- Time zone: UTC+8 (China Standard)

Guanyin Township (Chinese: 观音乡; pinyin: Guānyīn Xiāng) is a township of Gongcheng Yao Autonomous County in northeastern Guangxi, China. As of 2020, it has four villages under its administration:

- Guanyin Village
- Yangshi Village (洋石村)
- Shitang Village (狮塘村)
- Shuibin Village (水滨村)

== See also ==
- List of township-level divisions of Guangxi
