= Lian Prefecture (Guangdong) =

Historical administrative division in Guangdong, China

Lian Prefecture (連州): Xiping Commandery (熙平郡); Lianshan Commandery (連山郡)
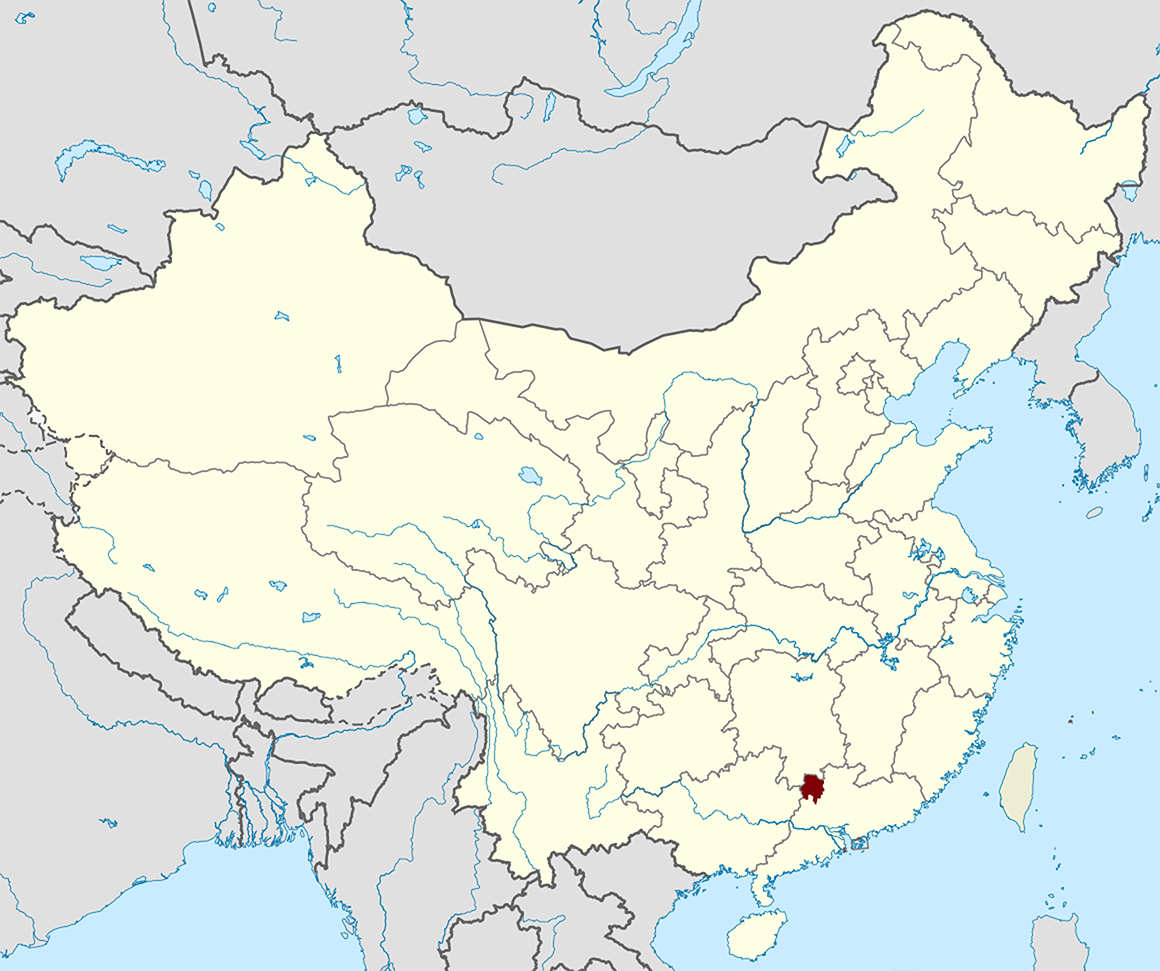
- Population
  - 740s or 750s: 143,533
  - 1070s or 1080s: Unknown, 36,943 households
- History
  - Created: 590 (Sui dynasty)
  - Abolished: 1912 (R.O. China)
  - Succeeded by: Lian County
- Contained within
  - Circuit: Tang dynasty: Lingnan Circuit; Song dynasty: Guangnan Circuit; Guangnan West Circuit

Lian Prefecture
- Traditional Chinese: 連州
- Simplified Chinese: 连州
Transcriptions
Standard Mandarin
- Hanyu Pinyin: Lián Zhōu

Lianzhou or Lian Prefecture was a zhou (prefecture) in imperial China in modern northwestern Guangdong, China. It existed (intermittently) from 590 to 1912. Between mid-600s and 621 it was known as Xiping Commandery, and between 742 and 758 as Lianshan Commandery.

== Counties ==
1. Guiyang (桂陽), modern Lianzhou
2. Yangshan (陽山), modern Yangshan County
3. Lianshan (連山), modern Lianshan Zhuang and Yao Autonomous County
