= Zhenba County =

Zhenba County 镇巴县 Chenpa
- County
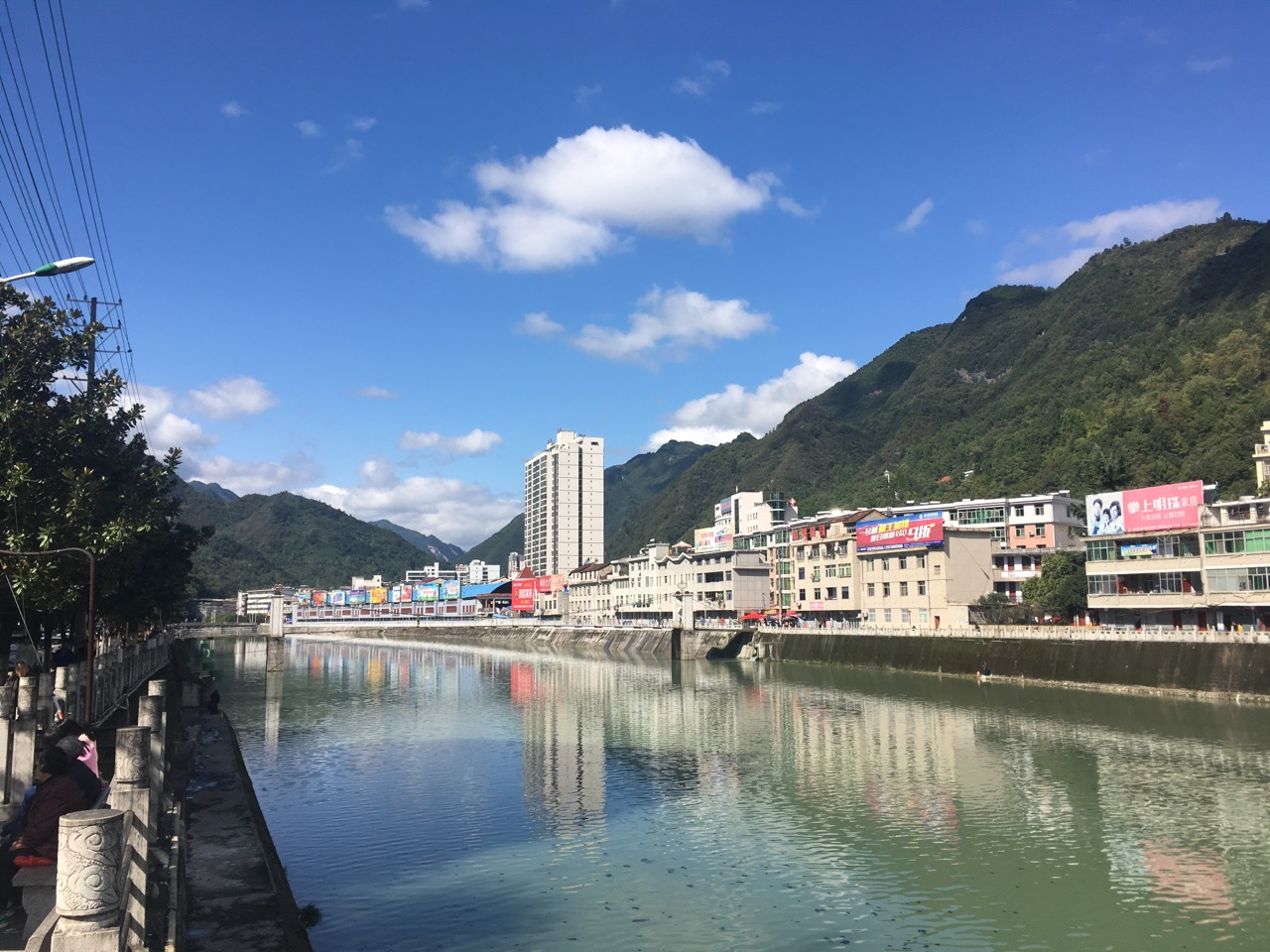

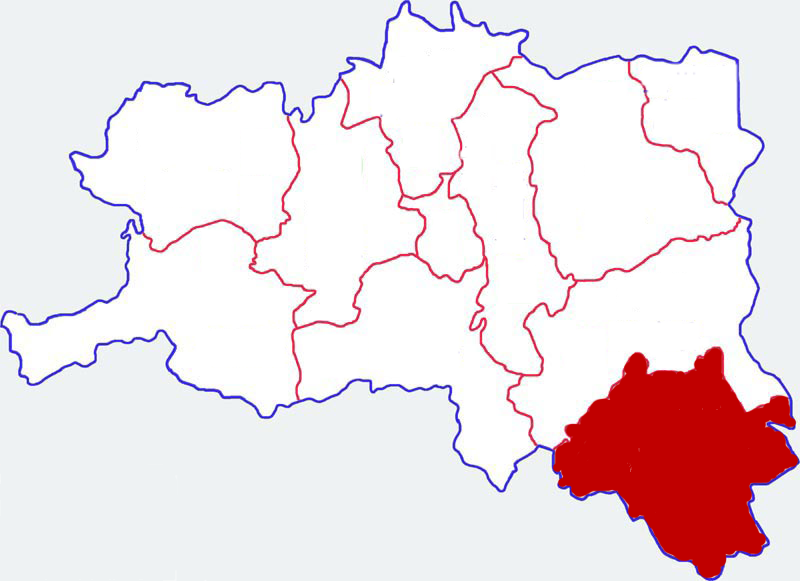
- Location in Hanzhong

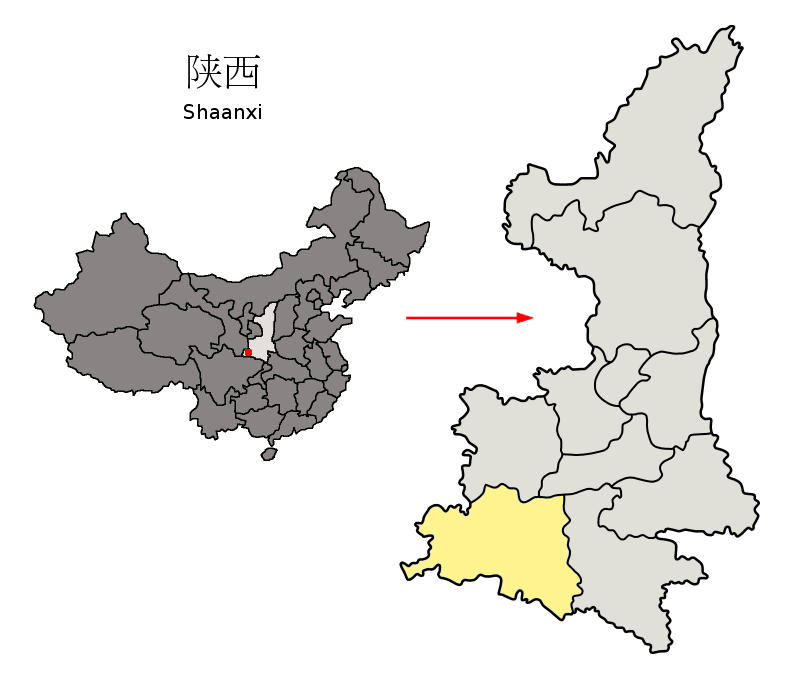
- Hanzhong in Shaanxi
- Coordinates: 32°32′12″N 107°53′42″E
- Country: People's Republic of China
- Province: Shaanxi
- Prefecture-level city: Hanzhong
- Established: 1913 (as Dingyuan County)
- Renamed: 1916 (Current)

Area
  - Total: 3,437 km^{2} (1,327 sq mi)

Population (2019)
  - Total: 279,972
  - Density: 81.46/km^{2} (211.0/sq mi)
- Time zone: UTC+8 (China standard time)
- Postal code: 723600
- Area code: (0)916
- Licence plates: 陕F
- Website: www.zb.gov.cn

Zhenba County (simplified Chinese: 镇巴县; traditional Chinese: 鎮巴縣; pinyin: Zhènbā Xiàn) is a county under the administration and in the southeast corner of Hanzhong City, in the southwest of Shaanxi province, China. The southernmost county-level division of Hanzhong, it borders Sichuan province to the south.

== Administrative divisions ==
As of 2020, Zhenba County is divided into 1 subdistrict and 19 towns.

Subdistricts

- Jingyang Subdistrict (泾洋街道)

Towns

- Yudu (渔渡镇)
- Yanchang (盐场镇)
- Guanyin (观音镇)
- Bamiao (巴庙镇)
- Xinglong (兴隆镇)
- Changling (长岭镇)
- Sanyuan (三元镇)
- Jianchi (简池镇)
- Nianzi (碾子镇)
- Xiaoyang (小洋镇)
- Qingshui (青水镇)
- Chinan (赤南镇)
- Ping'an (平安镇)
- Yangjiahe (杨家河镇)
- Bashan (巴山镇)
- Liba (黎坝镇)
- Rencun (仁村镇)
- Dachi (大池镇)
- Yongle (永乐镇)

== Climate ==
Climate data for Zhenba, elevation 694 m (2,277 ft), (1991–2020 normals, extremes 1981–present)
Month	Jan	Feb	Mar	Apr	May	Jun	Jul	Aug	Sep	Oct	Nov	Dec	Year
Record high °C (°F)	19.5 (67.1)	22.8 (73.0)	32.2 (90.0)	34.4 (93.9)	37.1 (98.8)	38.2 (100.8)	38.3 (100.9)	38.2 (100.8)	36.6 (97.9)	30.1 (86.2)	25.2 (77.4)	18.2 (64.8)	38.3 (100.9)
Mean daily maximum °C (°F)	8.3 (46.9)	10.9 (51.6)	15.9 (60.6)	21.8 (71.2)	25.1 (77.2)	28.4 (83.1)	30.9 (87.6)	30.4 (86.7)	25.1 (77.2)	20.1 (68.2)	14.7 (58.5)	9.7 (49.5)	20.1 (68.2)
Daily mean °C (°F)	3.0 (37.4)	5.5 (41.9)	9.6 (49.3)	14.9 (58.8)	18.4 (65.1)	22.0 (71.6)	24.5 (76.1)	23.8 (74.8)	19.5 (67.1)	14.5 (58.1)	9.1 (48.4)	4.4 (39.9)	14.1 (57.4)
Mean daily minimum °C (°F)	−0.6 (30.9)	1.7 (35.1)	5.2 (41.4)	10.0 (50.0)	13.8 (56.8)	17.7 (63.9)	20.5 (68.9)	19.9 (67.8)	16.2 (61.2)	11.3 (52.3)	5.7 (42.3)	0.9 (33.6)	10.2 (50.3)
Record low °C (°F)	−8.7 (16.3)	−7.6 (18.3)	−5.6 (21.9)	0.5 (32.9)	4.8 (40.6)	9.7 (49.5)	11.9 (53.4)	12.8 (55.0)	7.2 (45.0)	−1.0 (30.2)	−5.3 (22.5)	−12.2 (10.0)	−12.2 (10.0)
Average precipitation mm (inches)	5.2 (0.20)	17.3 (0.68)	33.6 (1.32)	69.0 (2.72)	144.0 (5.67)	161.1 (6.34)	260.9 (10.27)	193.1 (7.60)	199.0 (7.83)	108.1 (4.26)	49.7 (1.96)	10.1 (0.40)	1,251.1 (49.25)
Average precipitation days (≥ 0.1 mm)	5.8	7.3	10.3	11.7	13.8	13.5	14.2	13.2	14.2	12.8	9.4	7.3	133.5
Average snowy days	6.4	3.5	1.7	0.2	0	0	0	0	0	0	0.6	2.9	15.3
Average relative humidity (%)	71	70	68	72	76	80	81	81	84	84	81	75	77
Mean monthly sunshine hours	65.5	61.7	95.4	125.6	140.2	141.7	164.3	159.3	96.6	82.2	72.8	61.5	1,266.8
Percentage possible sunshine	21	20	26	32	33	33	38	39	26	24	23	20	28
Source: China Meteorological Administration

== Transportation ==
- China National Highway 210
