= Mount Guanyin (Dongguan) =

Mountain in Guangdong, China

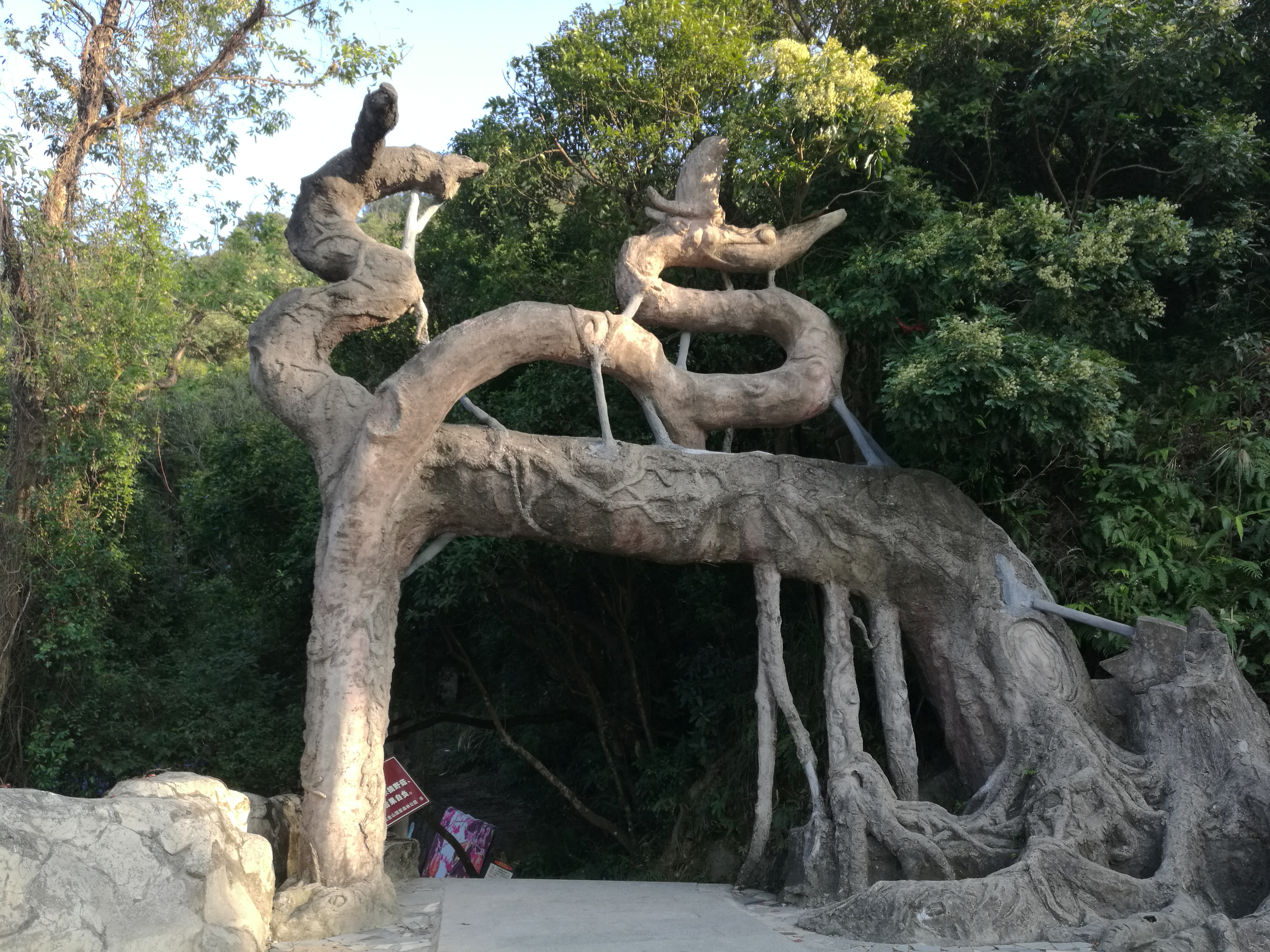
- Entrance of Mount Guanyin.

Highest point
- Elevation: 488-metre (1,601 ft)
- Coordinates: 22°54′41.4684″N 114°06′12.2868″E

Naming
- Native name: 观音山 (Chinese)

Geography
- Location within Guangdong
- Location: Zhangmutou Town, Dongguan, Guangdong, China

The Mount Guanyin (simplified Chinese: 观音山; traditional Chinese: 觀音山; pinyin: Guānyīnshān) also known as the National Forest Park of Mount Guanyin (simplified Chinese: 观音山国家森林公园; traditional Chinese: 觀音山國家森林公園; pinyin: Guānyīnshān Guójiā Sēnlín Gōngyuán), is a 488-metre (1,601 ft) mountain on the border of Dongguan and Shenzhen in Zhangmutou Town of Dongguan, south China's Guangdong province. On December 28, 2009, it has been categorized as a 4A level tourist site by the National Tourism Administration. It was added to the International Eco-Safety Cooperative Organization of the United Nations's list of the model foundation of international ecological traveling in China in October 2006. Established in 2000, Mount Guanyin National Forest Park is a multifunctional park integrating ecological sightseeing, entertainment, bodybuilding and religious and cultural tourism.

== History ==
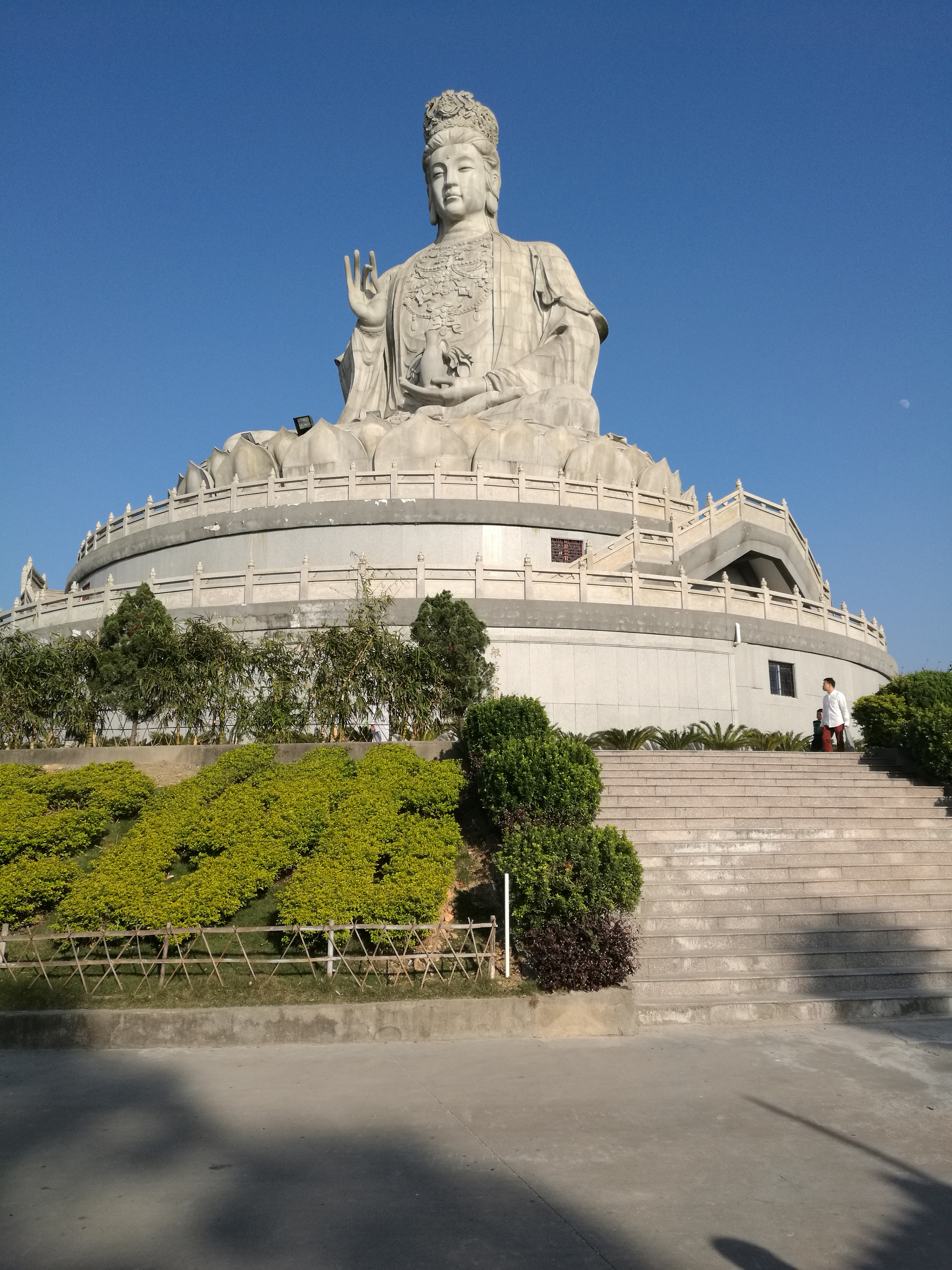
Sitting Statue of Saint Guanyin at Mount Guanyin.

In June 2001, a statue of Saint Guanyin was completed. It is 33-metre (108 ft) high and weighs 3,300,000-kilogram (7,300,000 lb). Statue of Saint Guanyin sits in the lotus posture with a vase of clean water in hand, wearing Keyuru, necklaces and decoration and a precious crown on the head. There is a sitting statue of Amitābha on the crown, which is the main symbol of Saint Guanyin.

In 2002, the Museum of Ancient Trees was founded by the Guangzhou Institute of Geography, Guangdong Academy of Sciences and the park, which is the first ancient tree museum in China. It was officially opened to the public on January 11, 2013.

In May 2013, the International Convention Centre was completed and officially opened to the public.

On December 28, 2009, the Mount Guanyin National Forest Park has been rated as a national 4A level scenic spot by the National Tourism Administration. It is the first national forest park of Dongguan authorized by the Bureau of Forestry of China.

== Geography ==
Mount Guanyin is protected within Mount Guanyin National Forest Park.

=== Climate ===
The mount enjoys a subtropical maritime monsoon climate and has plenty of rainfall and sunshine, the lowest temperature is 5 °C. Summer usually lasts from April 6 to October 10.

=== Natural history ===
There are more than 73 families and 199 plant species in the mount, including Ixonanthes chinensis, Artocarpus hypargyreus, Brainea insignis, Camellia nitidissima, Camellia sinensis, and Dimocarpus longan.

Animals that inhabit the mount are Asiatic salamander, Pangolin, and Owls.

== Tourist attractions ==
The Mount Guanyin National Forest Park has more than twenty tourist spots, including:

- Guanyin Square
- Statue of Saint Guanyin
- Guanyin Temple
- Hall of Three Saints
- Xiangong Peak (仙宫岭)
- Pudu Creek (普渡溪)
- Thanksgiving Lake
- Huiyin Wall (回音壁)
- Yixin Pavilion (怡心亭)
- Ciyun Pavilion (慈云阁)
- Guanpu Pavilion (观瀑亭)
- Museum of Ancient Trees
- International Convention Centre
- Xianquan Natatorium (仙泉游泳馆)
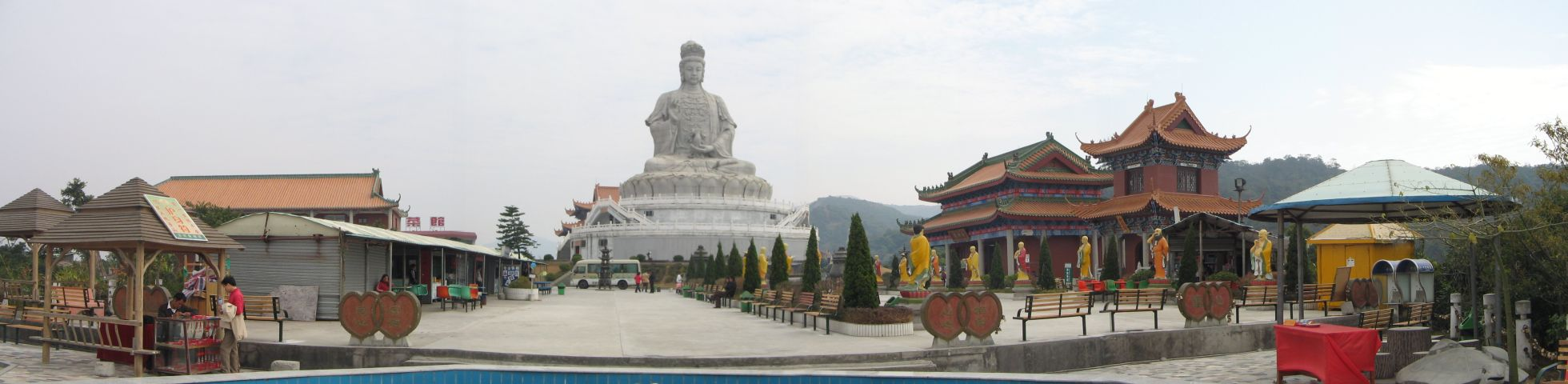
Guanyin Temple at Mount Guanyin.

== Transportation ==
- Take train from Guangzhou railway station or Guangzhou East railway station to Zhangmutou railway station.
- Take train from Shenzhen railway station to Zhangmutou railway station.
- Take bus No. 6 to Mount Guanyin National Forest Park station.
