= Pachyosa guanyin =

Scientific classification
- Domain: Eukaryota
- Kingdom: Animalia
- Phylum: Arthropoda
- Class: Insecta
- Order: Coleoptera
- Suborder: Polyphaga
- Infraorder: Cucujiformia
- Family: Cerambycidae
- Genus: Pachyosa
- Species: P. guanyin

Binomial name
- Pachyosa guanyin Yamasako & Chou, 2014

Species of beetle

Pachyosa guanyin is a species of beetle in the family Cerambycidae. It was described by Yamasako and Chou in 2014. It is known from Taiwan.
