= Dachi, Shaanxi =

Dachi 大池镇
- Town
- Location of Dachi in China
- Coordinates: 32°31′45″N 107°33′57″E
- Country: People's Republic of China
- Province: Shaanxi
- Prefecture-level city: Hanzhong
- County: Zhenba
- Village-level divisions: 1 residential community and 4 villages

Area
  - Total: 126.00 km^{2} (48.65 sq mi)
- Elevation: 1,135 m (3,724 ft)

Population (2018)
  - Total: 5,264
  - Density: 41.78/km^{2} (108.2/sq mi)
- Time zone: UTC+8 (China Standard)
- Area code: 0597

Dachi (Chinese: 大池; pinyin: Dàchí) is a town of Zhenba County in the Qin Mountains of southwestern Shaanxi province, China, 13 kilometres (8.1 mi) from the border with Sichuan and 31 km (19 mi) west of the county seat. As of 2018, it has one residential community and four villages under its administration. The town spans an area of 126.00 square kilometres (48.65 mi^{2}), and has a hukou population of 5,264 as of 2018.
