= Lianzhou, Luoding =

Lianzhou 连州镇
- Town
- Location in Guangdong
- Coordinates: 22°38′36″N 111°25′40″E
- Country: People's Republic of China
- Province: Guangdong
- Prefecture-level city: Yunfu
- County-level city: Luoding
- Time zone: UTC+8 (China Standard)

Lianzhou (Chinese: 连州) is a town of Luoding, Guangdong, China. As of 2018, it has one residential community and 16 villages under its administration.
