= Guanyin, Yibin =

Guanyin 观音镇
- Town
- Location in Sichuan
- Coordinates: 29°5′53″N 104°23′45″E
- Country: People's Republic of China
- Province: Sichuan
- Prefecture-level city: Yibin
- District: Xuzhou District
- Time zone: UTC+8 (China Standard)

Guanyin (Chinese: 观音; pinyin: Guānyīn) is a town in Xuzhou District, Yibin, Sichuan province, China. As of 2020, it has seven residential neighborhoods and 42 villages under its administration:

Neighborhoods

- Guanyin Community
- Wanjing Community (万菁社区)
- Xujia Community (徐家社区)
- Nanhua Community (南华社区)
- Shagou Community (沙沟社区)
- Guluo Community (古罗社区)
- Liangfeng Community (凉风社区)

Villages

- Qunzhong Village (群众村)
- Panshan Village (蟠山村)
- Zhouchang Village (周场村)
- Fengzhu Village (凤竹村)
- Shuangyu Village (双鱼村)
- Xicao Village (席草村)
- Xinxing Village (新兴村)
- Yinjia Village (尹家村)
- Huajia Village (花甲村)
- Datong Village (大同村)
- Jixiang Village (吉祥村)
- Maoping Village (茅坪村)
- Fenshui Village (分水村)
- Shulou Village (书楼村)
- Shouchang Village (寿昌村)
- Hongju Village (红菊村)
- Limin Village (利民村)
- Leidian Village (雷殿村)
- Xiaowan Village (小湾村)
- Wayao Village (瓦窑村)
- Panlong Village (蟠龙村)
- Tuhong Village (土红村)
- Shimiao Village (石庙村)
- Chenhe Village (陈河村)
- Hehua Village (荷花村)
- Gutang Village (古塘村)
- Guangxue Village (广学村)
- Zhongxiu Village (中秀村)
- Songxian Village (宋显村)
- Helin Village (合林村)
- Huli Village (互利村)
- Guluo Village (古罗村)
- Youzhi Village (佑之村)
- Wanshan Village (万山村)
- Liushu Village (柳树村)
- Yeshan Village (叶山村)
- Xinyan Village (新燕村)
- Chahua Village (茶花村)
- Liangfeng Village (良丰村)
- Dawu Village (大屋村)
- Dajing Village (大井村)
- Baiguo Village (白果村)

== See also ==
- List of township-level divisions of Sichuan
