= Guanyin Subdistrict =

Guanyin Subdistrict 观音街道
- Subdistrict
- Location in Sichuan
- Coordinates: 30°15′18″N 103°52′20″E
- Country: People's Republic of China
- Province: Sichuan
- Prefecture-level city: Meishan
- District: Pengshan District
- Time zone: UTC+8 (China Standard)

Guanyin Subdistrict (Chinese: 观音街道; pinyin: Guānyīn Jiēdào) is a subdistrict in Pengshan District, Meishan, Sichuan province, China. As of 2020, it has six residential neighborhoods and three villages under its administration:

Neighborhoods

- Caishan Community (蔡山社区)
- Maodian Community (毛店社区)
- Longmenqiao Community (龙门桥社区)
- Xingchong Community (兴崇社区)
- Wuhu Community (五湖社区)
- Guanyinpu Community (观音铺社区)

Villages

- Chundian Village (椿巅村)
- Wenchang Village (文昌村)
- Guoyuan Village (果园村)

== See also ==
- List of township-level divisions of Sichuan
