= Lianzhou =

Lianzhou 连州市
- County-level city
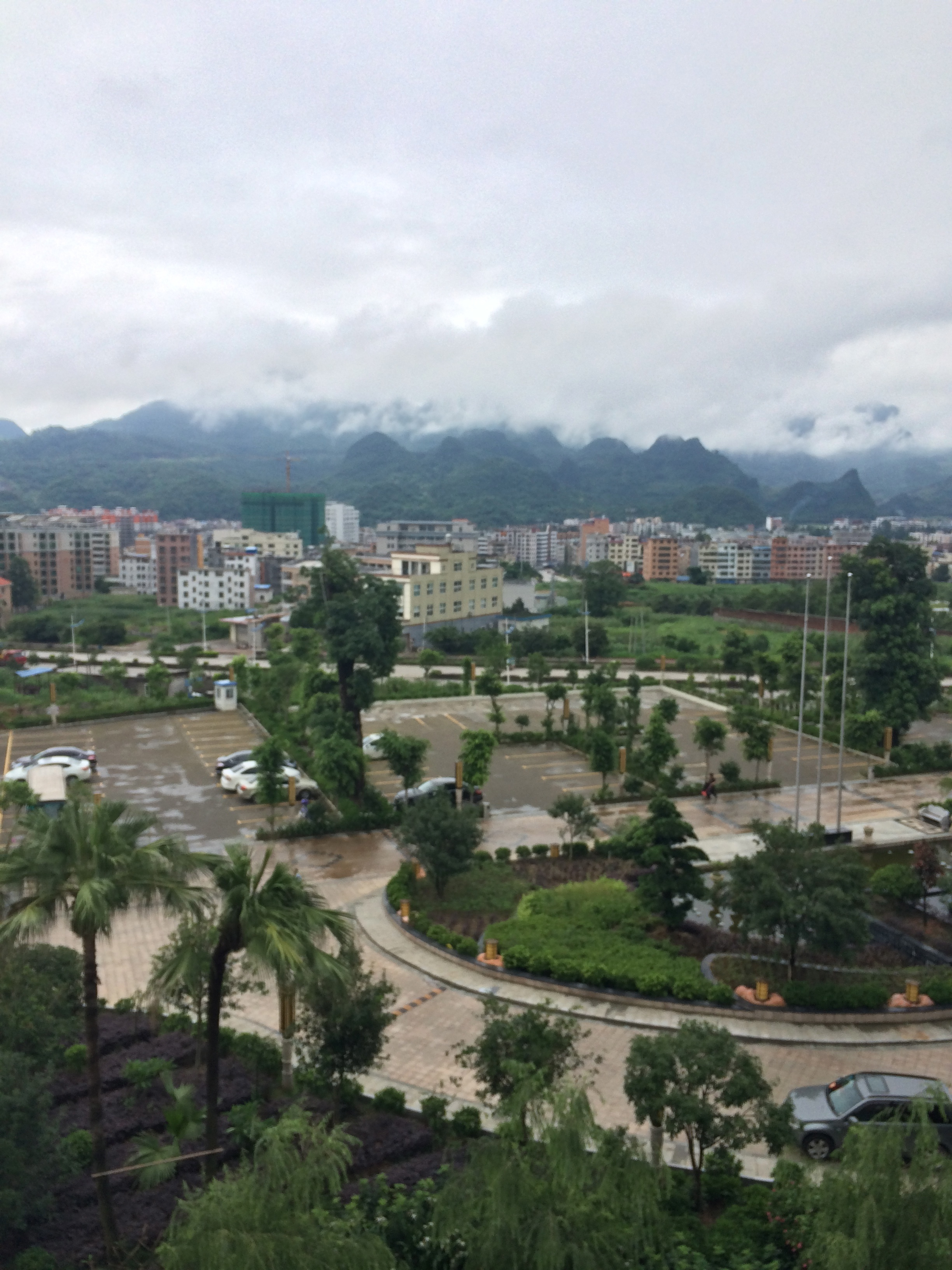

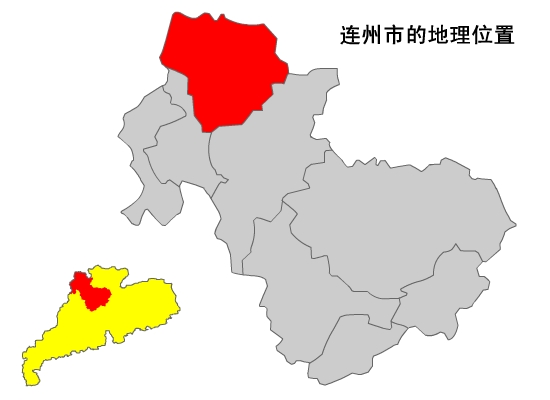
- Lianzhou in Qingyuan

- Location in Guangdong
- Coordinates: 24°46′52″N 112°22′37″E
- Country: People's Republic of China
- Province: Guangdong
- Prefecture-level city: Qingyuan
- Townships: 12

Area
  - Total: 2,663.33 km^{2} (1,028.32 sq mi)

Population (2010 Census)
  - Total: 367,859
- Time zone: UTC+8 (China Standard)
- Website: www.lianzhou.gov.cn

Lianzhou (simplified Chinese: 连州; traditional Chinese: 連州; pinyin: Liánzhōu; Jyutping: Lin^{4}zau^{1}), formerly Lian County or Lianxian (postal: Linhsien; 连县; 連縣; Lián Xiàn; lin^{4}jyun^{6}), is a county-level city in northern Guangdong Province, China, and is the northernmost county-level division of the prefecture-level city of Qingyuan. It is known as the host city of the Lianzhou International Photography Festival (LIPF) and as a historic and cultural landmark of Guangdong Province.

== History ==
Lianzhou became part of the Changsha Commandery during the Qin dynasty. During the Han dynasty, which began in 206 BC, the Yangxian prefecture consisted of three cities: Lianzhou, Liannan, and Lianshan. Emperor Kaihuang later put Lianzhou in the Ben prefecture during the Sui dynasty (581–618 AD).

On December 8, 1949, the Communist People's Liberation Army took over Lianzhou, then called Lianxian, from the Kuomintang. On December 20, 1949, the People's Government of Lianxian was established. On April 22, 1994, Lianxian was renamed Lianzhou City. In 1996, the government of Guangdong Province named Lianzhou as a National Famous Historic and Cultural City.

== Geography ==
Located in the northwest portion of Guangdong, Lianzhou extends from 112° 47' to 112° 7' E longitude and from 24° 37'N to 25° 12' N latitude. It is situated on the Lian River and the Little Bei River, southeast of Yangshan County, southwest of Liannan County, and north of Linwu County. The total area under the city's administration is 2,663.33 square kilometres (1,028.32 square miles).

=== Climate ===
Lianzhou has a subtropical climate and is affected by the monsoon. From October through March, it experiences the northeast monsoon, and from April through September, it experiences the summer monsoon, mainly with a southwest wind. The city's mountain climate is good for crop growth and four-season tillage.

Climate data for Lianzhou, elevation 132 m (433 ft), (1991–2020 normals, extremes 1955–present)
Month	Jan	Feb	Mar	Apr	May	Jun	Jul	Aug	Sep	Oct	Nov	Dec	Year
Record high °C (°F)	27.8 (82.0)	31.2 (88.2)	34.5 (94.1)	35.2 (95.4)	36.6 (97.9)	39.4 (102.9)	41.6 (106.9)	40.5 (104.9)	39.0 (102.2)	37.3 (99.1)	34.0 (93.2)	28.3 (82.9)	41.6 (106.9)
Mean daily maximum °C (°F)	13.7 (56.7)	16.3 (61.3)	19.0 (66.2)	24.9 (76.8)	29.3 (84.7)	31.9 (89.4)	34.2 (93.6)	34.0 (93.2)	31.4 (88.5)	27.5 (81.5)	22.3 (72.1)	16.5 (61.7)	25.1 (77.1)
Daily mean °C (°F)	9.3 (48.7)	11.7 (53.1)	14.8 (58.6)	20.3 (68.5)	24.4 (75.9)	27.1 (80.8)	28.7 (83.7)	28.2 (82.8)	26.0 (78.8)	21.7 (71.1)	16.4 (61.5)	11.0 (51.8)	20.0 (67.9)
Mean daily minimum °C (°F)	6.5 (43.7)	8.7 (47.7)	12.0 (53.6)	17.1 (62.8)	21.0 (69.8)	23.9 (75.0)	25.0 (77.0)	24.6 (76.3)	22.3 (72.1)	17.7 (63.9)	12.6 (54.7)	7.5 (45.5)	16.6 (61.8)
Record low °C (°F)	−6.9 (19.6)	−1.0 (30.2)	−0.2 (31.6)	5.4 (41.7)	11.1 (52.0)	15.7 (60.3)	19.1 (66.4)	19.8 (67.6)	14.6 (58.3)	5.6 (42.1)	0.7 (33.3)	−3.4 (25.9)	−6.9 (19.6)
Average precipitation mm (inches)	77.8 (3.06)	91.3 (3.59)	168.9 (6.65)	200.6 (7.90)	279.8 (11.02)	288.8 (11.37)	158.0 (6.22)	154.6 (6.09)	86.0 (3.39)	71.3 (2.81)	66.5 (2.62)	52.5 (2.07)	1,696.1 (66.79)
Average precipitation days (≥ 0.1 mm)	12.0	12.8	18.6	17.2	18.0	19.9	14.7	14.5	9.8	6.1	7.6	8.3	159.5
Average snowy days	0.6	0.2	0	0	0	0	0	0	0	0	0	0.4	1.2
Average relative humidity (%)	77	78	83	82	81	83	78	79	77	74	75	74	78
Mean monthly sunshine hours	70.1	61.0	51.4	73.9	110.3	128.8	199.6	188.4	163.0	158.0	127.7	112.0	1,444.2
Percentage possible sunshine	21	19	14	19	27	32	48	47	45	44	39	34	32
Source: China Meteorological Administrationall-time record low

== Administrative divisions ==
Lianzhou consists of ten towns (Lianzhou, Bao'an, Xingzi, Longping, Xian, Dongbei, Fengyang, Xijiang, Jiubei, and Dalubian) and two nationality townships (Yao'an and Sanshui).

== Population ==
From 1953 to 2000, Lianzhou participated in five nationwide censuses:

Year	Households	Males	Females	Total Population
1953	57,622	124,762	113,886	238,648
1964	62,797	146,392	139,976	286,368
1982	83,053	218,370	207,795	426,165
1990	99,769	237,819	222,246	460,075
2000	112,692	212,292	197,068	409,360

== Cityscape ==
=== Natural features ===
The natural environment of Lianzhou has been noted by poets such as Liu Yuxi and intellectuals such as Han Yu, who wrote about the area's landscape in Yanxiting Ji (吾州之山水名天下).

In the late Ming Dynasty, Qu Dajun explored the gorges in the Lingnan area and wrote Guangdong Xinyu, in which he praised the Huangchuan Three Gorges.

Tanling Rae'era is the highest lake in Guangdong Province, 640 meters above sea level. The Lianzhou Underground River, which runs through four mountains, is approximately 1,500 meters in length. Called "The First Underground River in Guangdong Province", it has many oddly-shaped stalactites, sea fogs, steep cliffs, old pines, thermal springs, and waterfalls.

=== Cultural sites ===
Lianzhou's cultural monuments include Yanxi Arbour, which was built during the Tang Dynasty, and Huiguang Tower, which was constructed during the Northern and Southern dynasties more than 1,500 years ago. It is known as the Oriental Leaning Tower for its tilt.

The Fushan Old Temple, one of the Grotto-heavens of Taoists, was also built during the Northern and Southern dynasties.
