= Gwaneumsan =

Mountain in Pocheon, South Korea

Highest point
- Elevation: 733 m (2,405 ft)
- Coordinates: 38°02′N 127°19′E

Geography
- Location: South Korea

Korean name
- Hangul: 관음산
- Hanja: 觀音山
- RR: Gwaneumsan
- MR: Kwanŭmsan

Gwaneumsan (Korean: 관음산) is a mountain in Pocheon, Gyeonggi Province in South Korea. It has an elevation of 733 m (2,405 ft).

== See also ==
- List of mountains in Korea
