= Guanyin, Shaanxi =

Guanyin 观音镇
- Town
- Location in China
- Coordinates: 32°29′20″N 108°4′49″E
- Country: People's Republic of China
- Province: Shaanxi
- Prefecture-level city: Hanzhong
- County: Zhenba County
- Time zone: UTC+8 (China Standard)

Guanyin (Chinese: 观音; pinyin: Guānyīn) is a town in Zhenba County, Shaanxi province, China. As of 2020, it administers Xiaonanhai Residential Community (小南海社区) and the following 13 villages:

- Dashichuan Village (大市川村)
- Majiaying Village (马家营村)
- Xingzihe Village (星子河村)
- Chuhe Village (楮河村)
- Sixi Village (司溪河村)
- Taoshuwan Village (桃树湾村)
- Bajiaomiao Village (八角庙村)
- Tianjiaba Village (田家坝村)
- Qiaogou Village (桥沟村)
- Mijiaba Village (米家坝村)
- Jinzhenba Village (金针坝村)
- Xiaoligou Village (小里沟村)
- Jifeng Village (继丰村)

== See also ==
- List of township-level divisions of Shaanxi
