= Guanyin Creek =

River in Changsha, China

Coordinates: 27°58′54″N 112°58′38″E

The Guanyin Creek (Chinese: 观音港) is a seasonal river located in the left (western) bank of Xiang River, Pingtang Subdistrict of Yuelu District, Changsha, Hunan, China. The creek has a length of about 6 kilometres (3.7 mi) with a drainage area of about 10 square kilometres (3.9 sq mi), its headwaters rise in Huangtuping (Chinese: 黄土坪) of Lianhuashan Village (Chinese: 莲花山村). The creek flows east through Hongqiao Village (Chinese: 红桥村) and Guanyingang Community (Chinese: 观音港社区), the creek joins Xiang River at Yangjiazui (Chinese: 杨家咀).
