= Longtangzhen railway station =

Intercity railway station in Qingyuan, China

Longtangzhen 龙塘镇
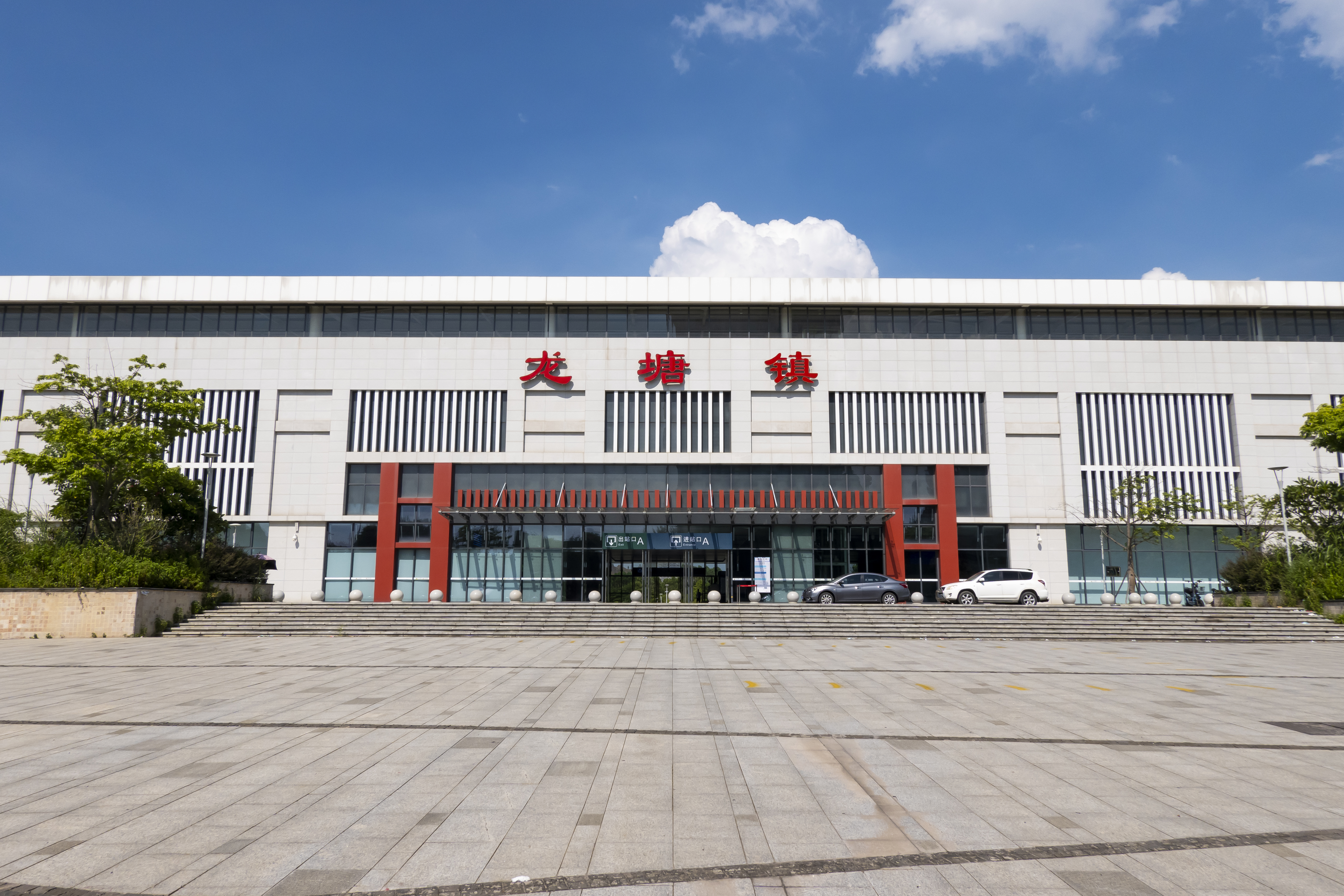
- Exterior

Chinese name
- Simplified Chinese: 龙塘镇站
- Traditional Chinese: 龍塘鎮站
Transcriptions
Standard Mandarin
- Hanyu Pinyin: Lóngtángzhèn Zhàn
Yue: Cantonese
- Yale Romanization: Lùhngtòhngján Jaahm
- Jyutping: Lung^{4}tong^{4}zan^{3} Zaam^{6}

General information
- Location: Next to intersection of Qingyuan Boulevard (清远大道) and Longtang Road (龙塘路); Longtang, Qingcheng, Qingyuan, Guangdong; China
- Coordinates: 23°36′30.89″N 113°4′42.74″E
- Owner: Pearl River Delta Metropolitan Region intercity railway
- Operator: Guangdong Intercity
- Line: Guangzhou–Qingyuan intercity railway
- Platforms: 2 (2 side platforms)
- Tracks: 4

Construction
- Structure type: Elevated
- Accessible: Yes

Other information
- Station code: LVB (Pinyin: LTZ)

History
- Opened: 30 November 2020 (5 years ago)

Services
Preceding station	Pearl River Delta Metropolitan Region Intercity Railway	Following station
Qingcheng towards Feixia	Guangzhou–Qingyuan intercity railway	Yinzhan towards Guangzhou Baiyun
Location

Longtangzhen railway station (Chinese: 龙塘镇站; pinyin: Lóngtángzhèn Zhàn; Cantonese Yale: Lùhngtòhngján Jaahm) is a railway station located in Qingcheng, Qingyuan, Guangdong, China. It opened on 30 November 2020.

Northeast of the station is the Longtang EMU Maintenance Facility, used to maintain the trains that run on Guangzhou–Qingyuan intercity railway and Suishen intercity railway.

== Features ==
The station is a two-storey four track elevated station with two side platforms next to Qingyuan Bouelvard. It has 2 points of entry/exit.

=== Entrances/exits ===
- A: Guangqing Boulevard, Longguo Road
- B: 133 Township Road

== Gallery ==
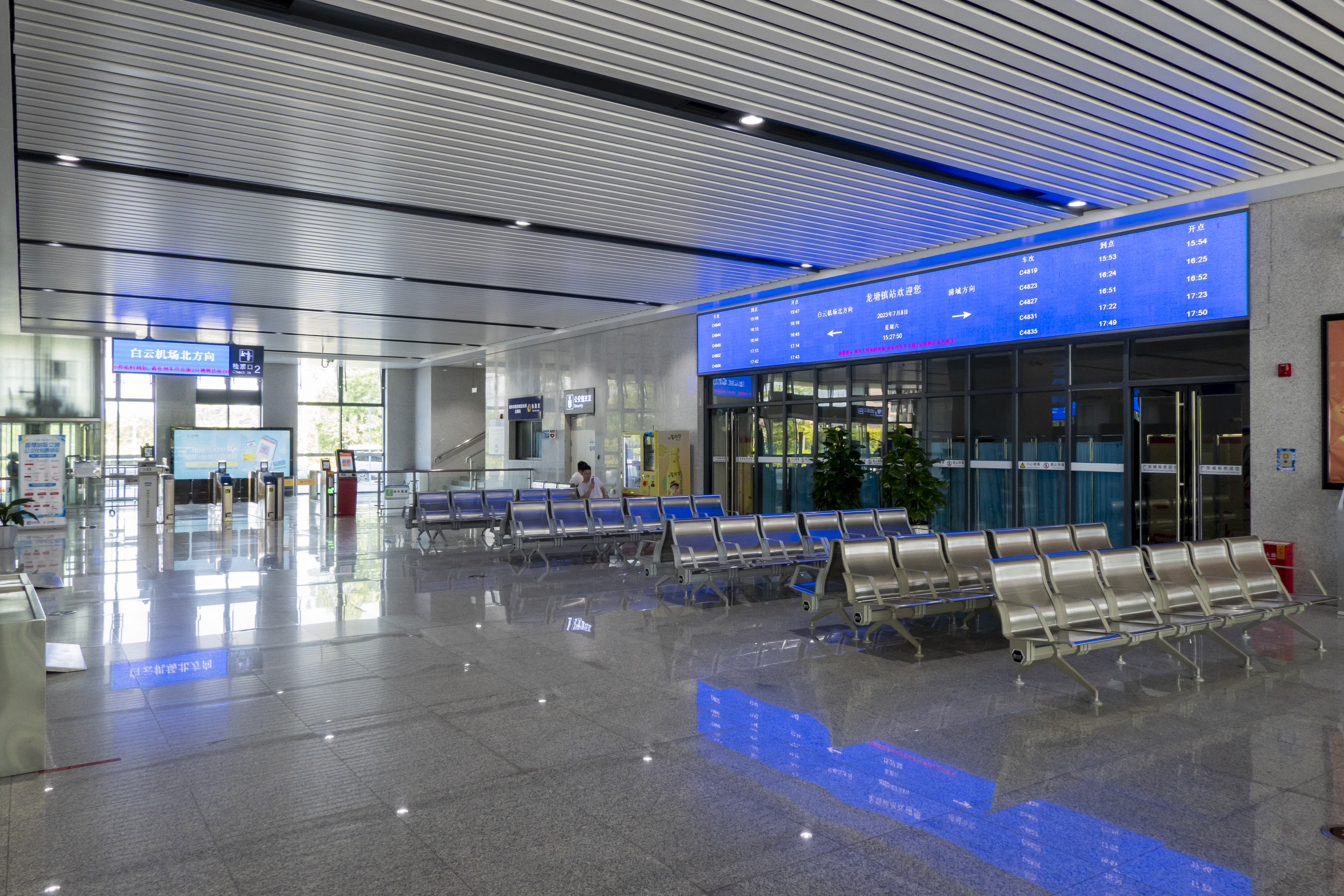
Concourse

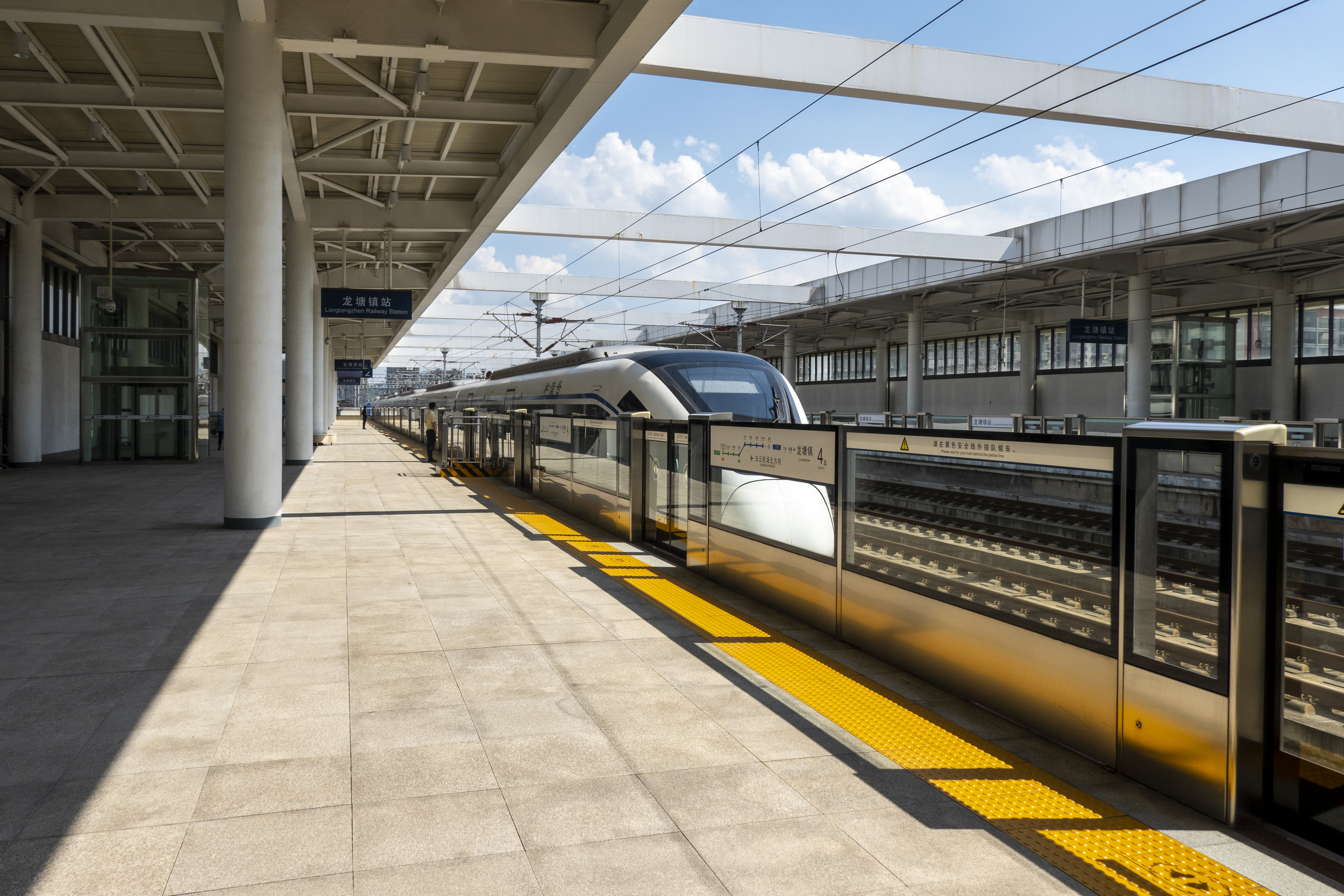
Platform 2

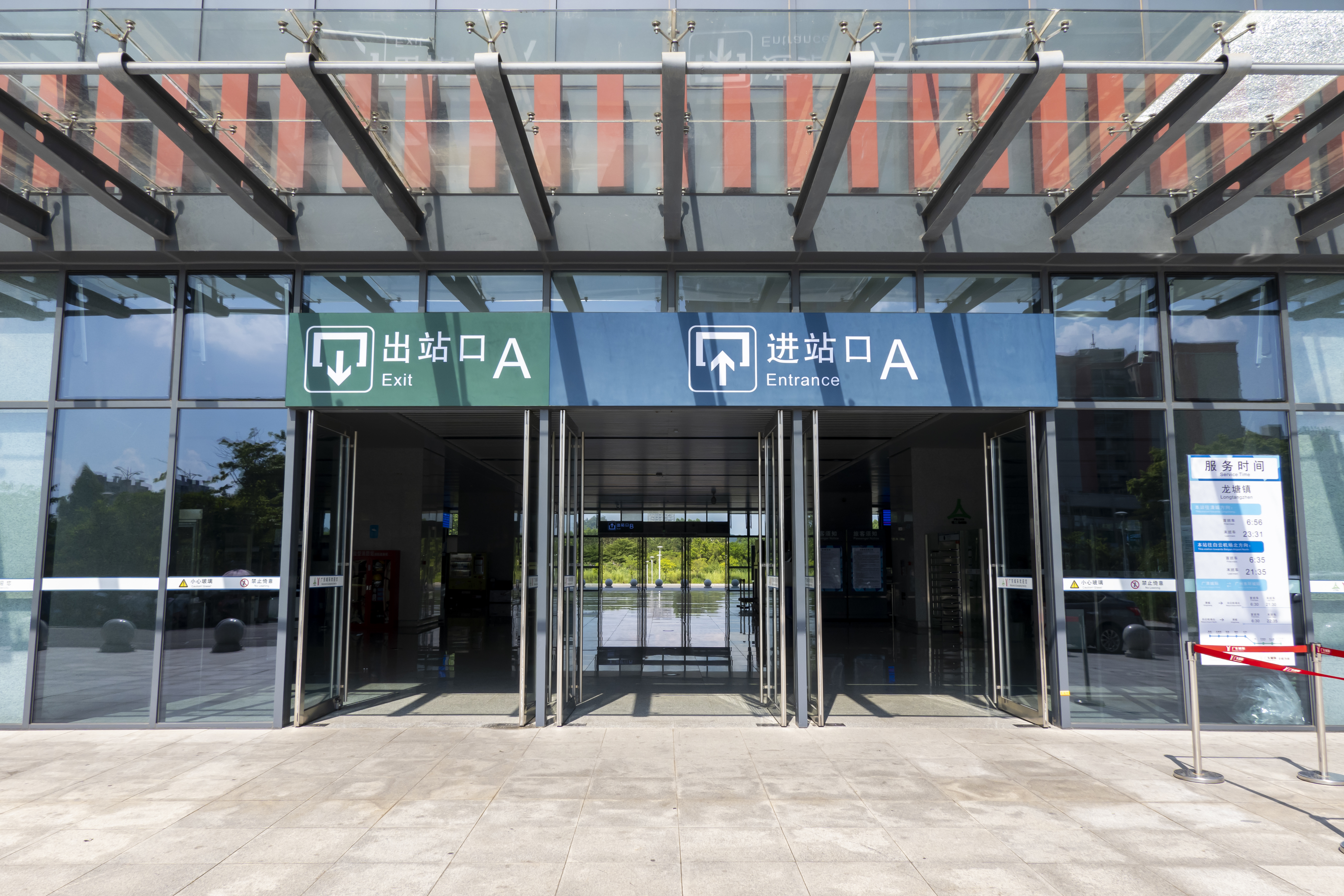
Entrance A

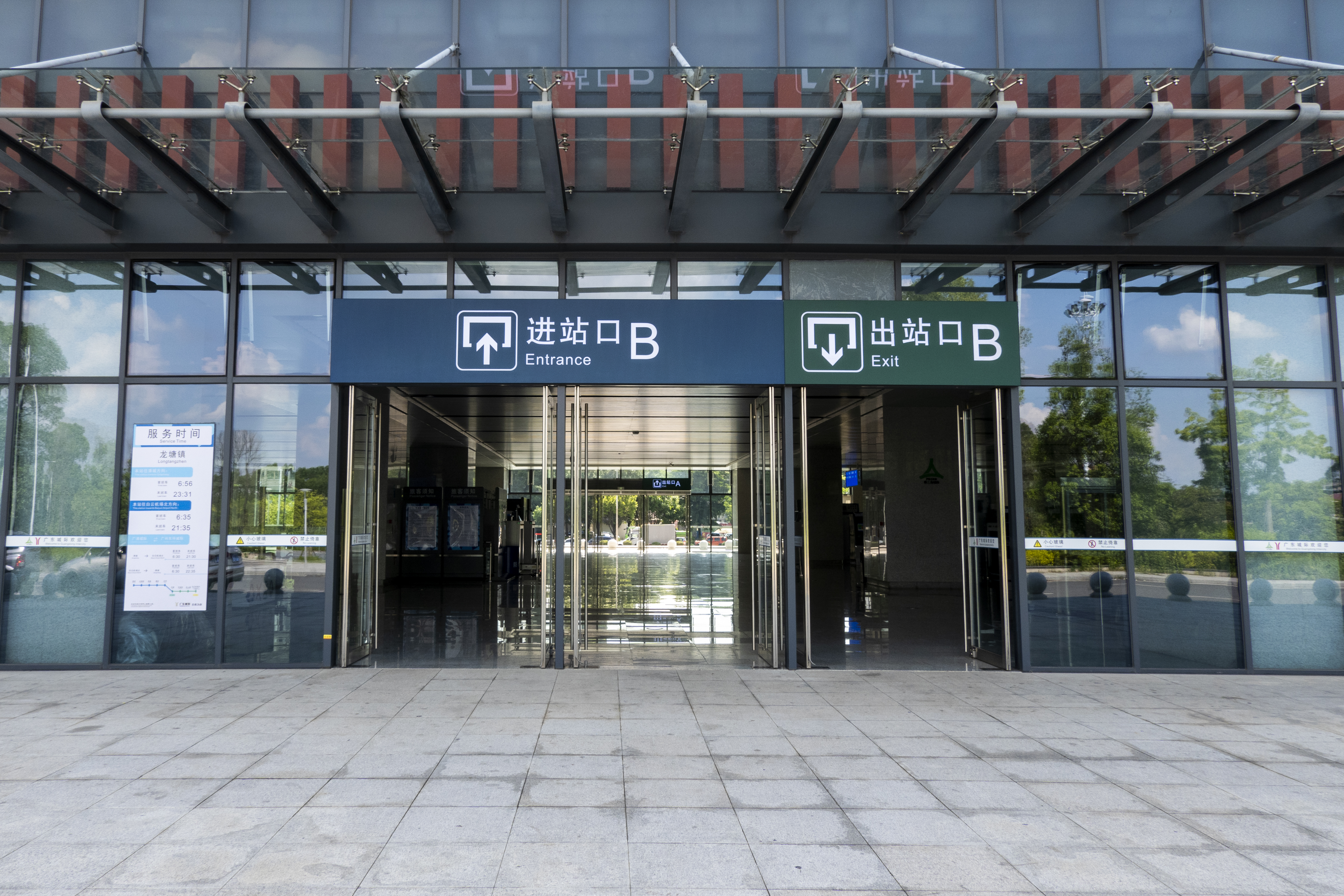
Entrance B

== History ==
The station was called Longtang station during the planning and construction phase, and was later renamed to Longtangzhen (Town) station. On 30 November 2020, the station opened with the opening of the Guangzhou-Qingyuan Intercity Railway.
