= Qingyuan Maglev Tourist Line =

Maglev line completed in Qingyuan, China

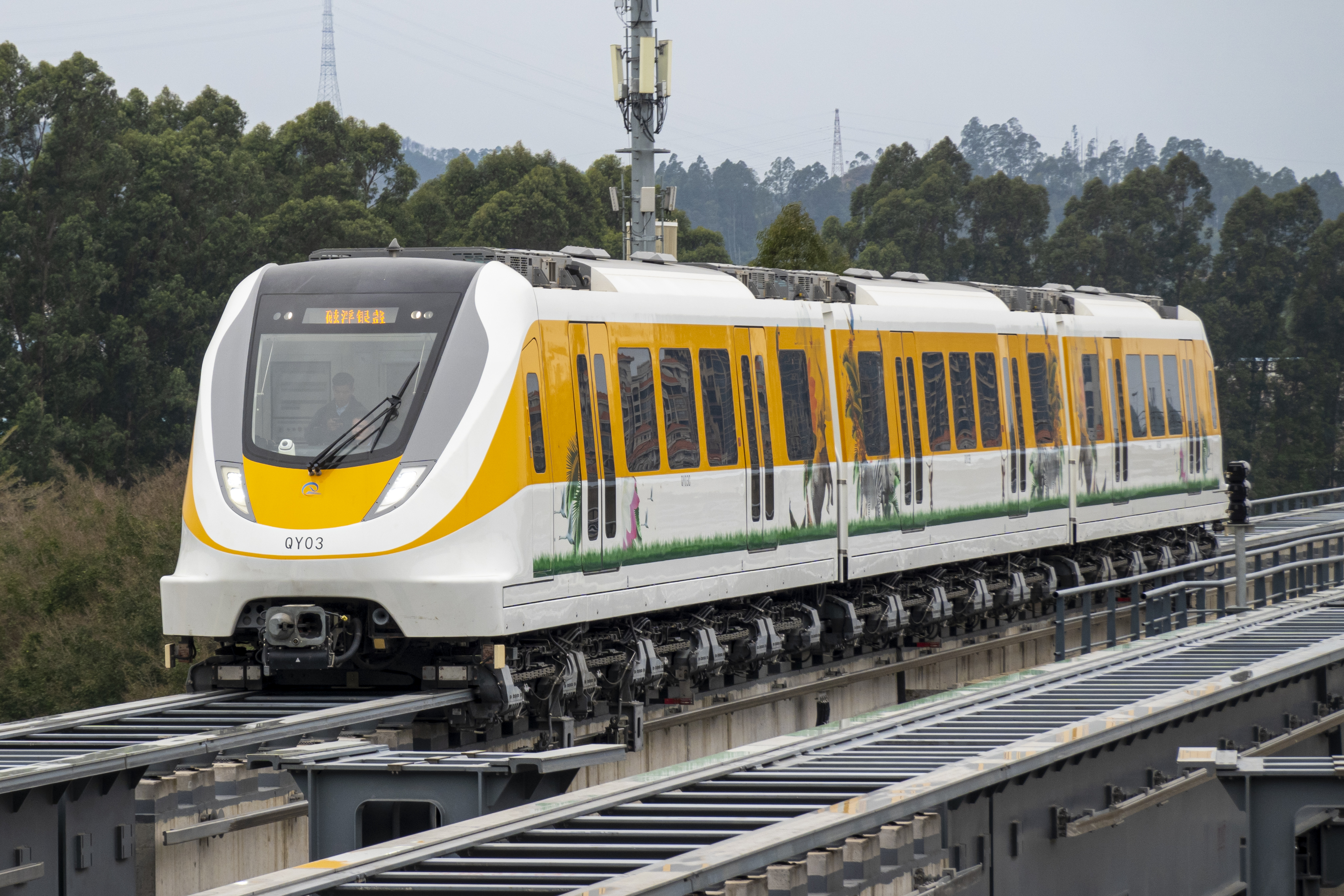
- QY03 train entering Maglev Yinzhan Station

Overview
- Native name: 清远磁浮旅游专线
- Status: in operation
- Owner: Qingyuan Maglev Transportation Co., Ltd
- Locale: Qingyuan, Guangdong Province, China
- Termini: Maglev Yinzhan; Maglev Changlong
- Stations: 3

Service
- Type: Light rail (Maglev)
- Train number(s): 5
- Rolling stock: 3-car maglev trains (by CRRC Tangshan and CRRC Changchun)

History
- Commenced: 2017
- Opened: 25 January 2025; 10 months ago

Technical
- Line length: 8.014 km (4.980 mi)
- Number of tracks: 2
- Character: Fully elevated
- Track gauge: 1860 mm (about 6 ft 27/32 in)
- Operating speed: 120 km/h (75 mph)

Qingyuan Maglev Tourist Line is a medium-low speed maglev line in Qingyuan, Guangdong province, China.

The line operates at speeds up to 120 km/h (75 mph). The first phase is 8.1 km (5.0 mi) with 3 stations and a site reserved for a fourth station. The first phase connects the Yinzhan railway station on the Guangzhou–Qingyuan intercity railway with the Qingyuan Chimelong Theme Park. In the long-term, the line will be 38.5 km (23.9 mi).

== Stations ==
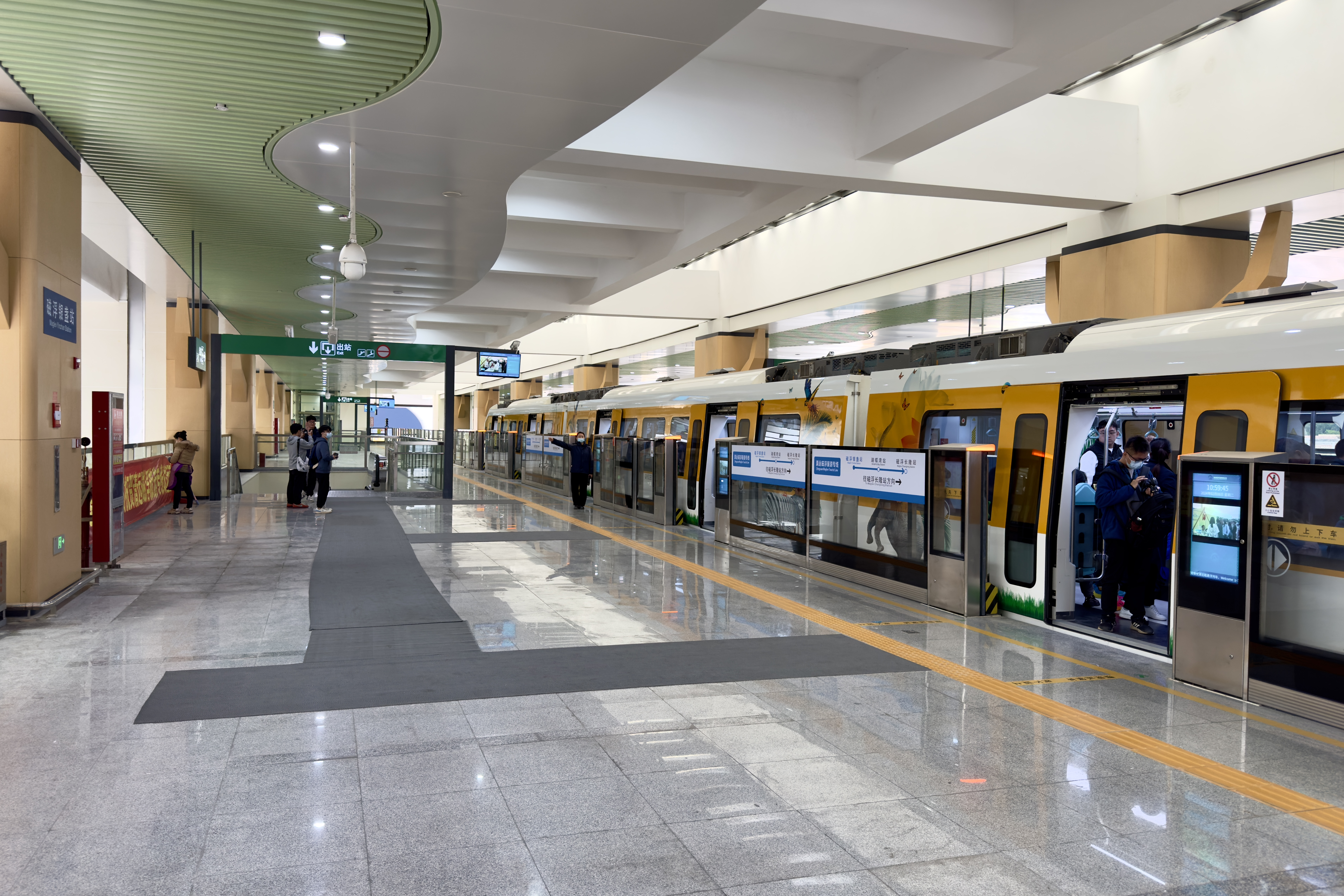
Platform of Maglev Yinzhan Station

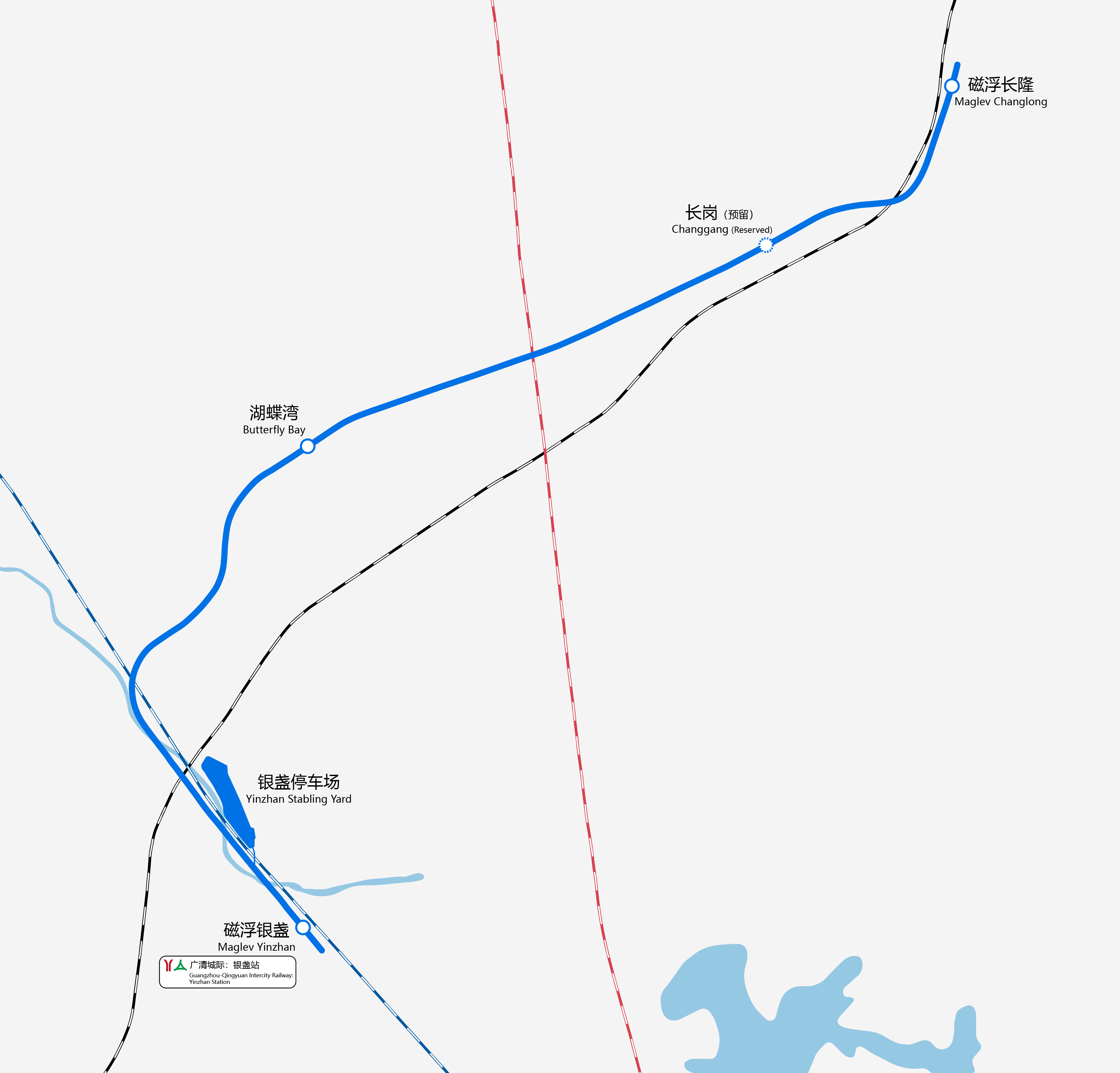
Map of the Qingyuan Maglev

Station name	Connections	Distance km	Location
Qingyuan Chimelong 清远长隆	GQ		23.5520494°N 113.1246584°E
Butterfly Bay 湖蝶湾			23.57492°N 113.12487°E
Maglev Changgang (reserved station) 磁浮长岗			
Chimelong Forest Kingdom 长隆森林王国			23.58979°N 113.15784°E

== History ==
The first train of Qingyuan Maglev rolled off the assembly line in the train's depot in December 2022, and starts test run on March 23, 2023. All track-laying work for the line completed on August 10, 2022.

On September 28, 2023, the line has entered the no-load test operation stage. The line's trial operation was briefly open to the public from February 5 to 6, 2024.

Starting 25 January 2025, the line has opened to the public, to serve the newly-opened Qingyuan Chimelong, which opened on the same day.

== Operation ==
Starting from February 1, 2025, the Qingyuan Maglev's operating hours will be from 09:30–19:30, with a total of 3 trains on the line and an operating interval of 12–20 minutes. The full fare of the Qingyuan Maglev is ¥15 – the journey from Maglev Yinzhan station to Butterfly Bay station costing ¥5, and the journey from Butterfly Bay station to Chimelong Forest Kingdom station costing ¥10. Passengers can pay for single-trip tickets or day-trip tickets, the latter for ¥35 apiece. Welfare tickets are offered to students at half price. A child below 1.3 m (4 ft 3 in) in height can ride for free, but must be accompanied by an adult.
