= Yinzhan railway station =

Intercity railway station in Qingyuan, China

Yinzhan 银盏
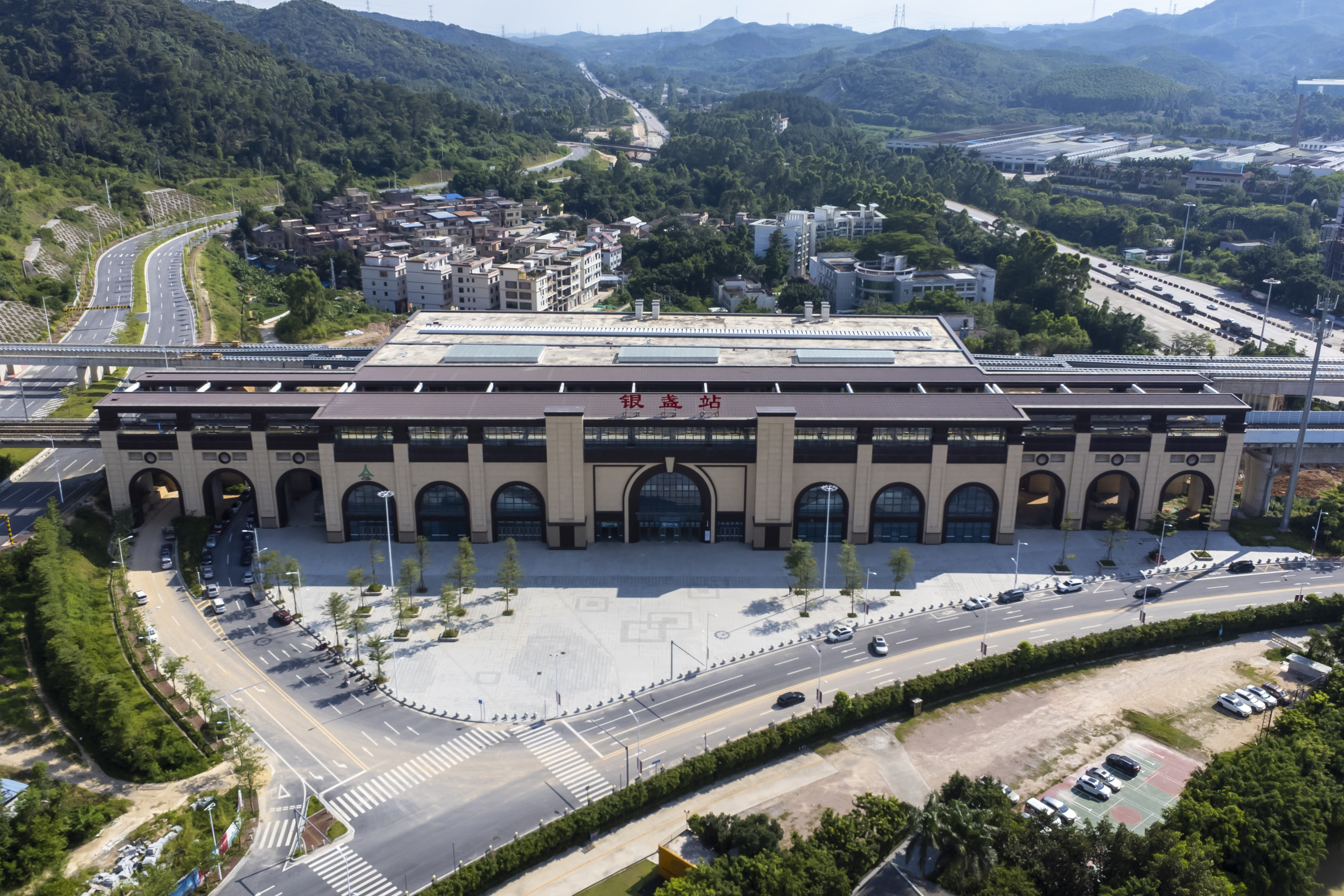
- Exterior (Aerial view)

Chinese name
- Simplified Chinese: 银盏站
- Traditional Chinese: 銀盞站
Transcriptions
Standard Mandarin
- Hanyu Pinyin: Yínzhǎn Zhàn
Yue: Cantonese
- Yale Romanization: Ngánjaan Jaahm
- Jyutping: Ngan^{4}zaan^{2} Zaam^{6}

General information
- Location: Yinzhan Section (银盏段), Guangqing Boulevard (广清大道), Yinzhan Community (银盏社区); Longtang, Qingcheng, Qingyuan, Guangdong; China
- Coordinates: 23°33′7.344″N 113°7′28.546″E
- Owner: Pearl River Delta Metropolitan Region intercity railway
- Operator: Guangdong Intercity
- Line: Guangzhou–Qingyuan intercity railway
- Platforms: 2 (2 side platforms)
- Tracks: 2
- Connections: Qingyuan Maglev Tourist Line

Construction
- Structure type: Elevated
- Accessible: Yes

Other information
- Station code: YZA (Pinyin: YZH)

History
- Opened: 30 November 2020 (5 years ago)

Services
Preceding station	Pearl River Delta Metropolitan Region Intercity Railway	Following station
Longtangzhen towards Feixia	Guangzhou–Qingyuan intercity railway	Shiling towards Guangzhou Baiyun
Preceding station	Qingyuan Maglev Tourist Line	Following station
Butterfly Bay towards Chimelong Forest Kingdom	Qingyuan Maglev Tourist Line transfer at Qingyuan Chimelong	Terminus
Location

Yinzhan railway station (Chinese: 银盏站; pinyin: Yínzhǎn Zhàn; Cantonese Yale: Ngánjaan Jaahm) is a railway station located in Qingcheng, Qingyuan, Guangdong, China. It opened on 30 November 2020.

== Features ==
The station is an elevated three-storey station with two side platforms. It is near the New Yinzhan Hot Spring Resort and Qingyuan Chimelong Station. It has 2 points of entry/exit, in which Exit B opened with the station's initial opening, and Exit A opened when the Qingyuan Maglev Tourist Line opened.

=== Entrances/exits ===
- A: Guangqing Boulevard, Qingyuan Maglev Tourist Line Qingyuan Chimelong Station
- B: Guangqing Boulevard, New Yinzhan Hot Spring Resort

== Gallery ==
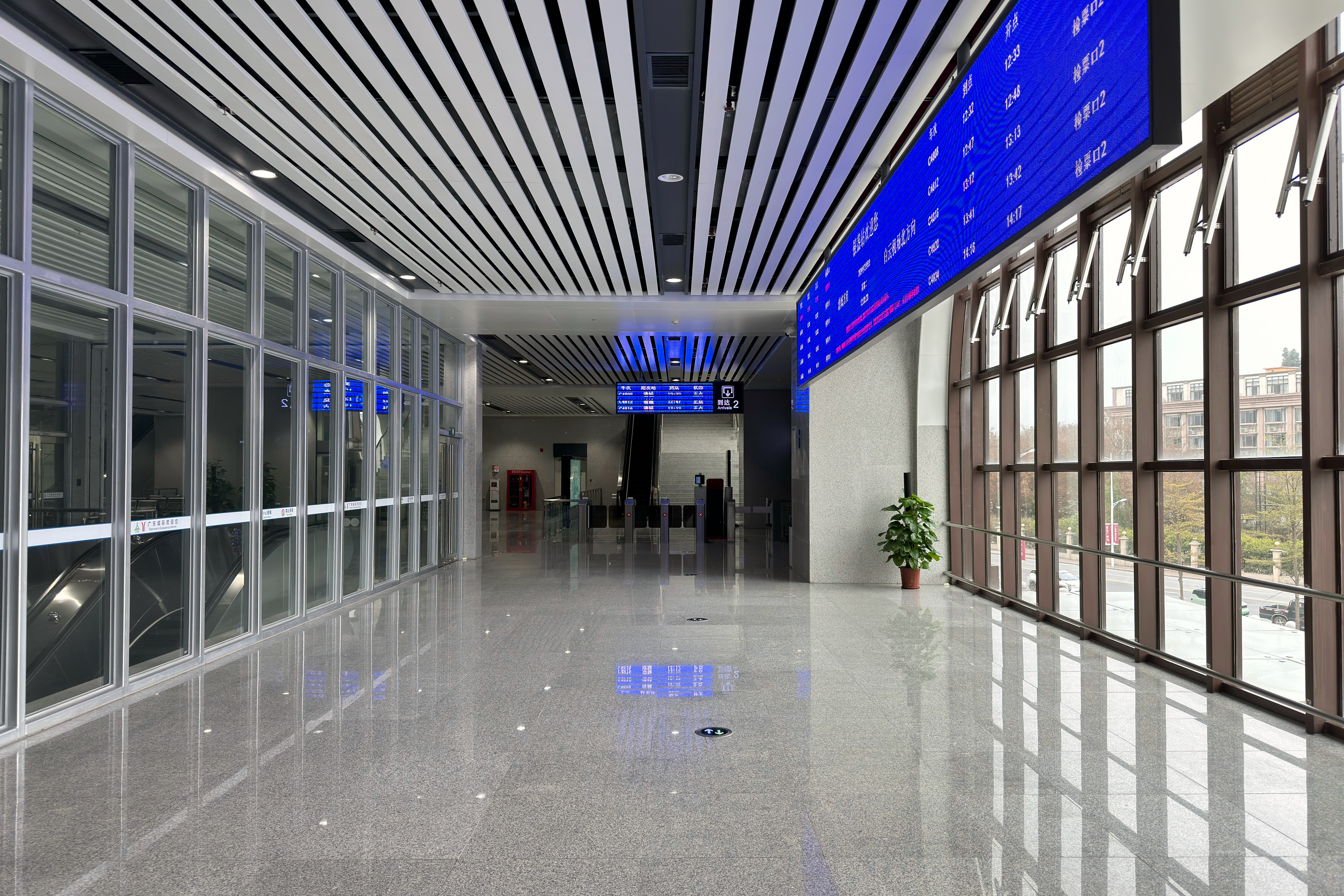
Concourse

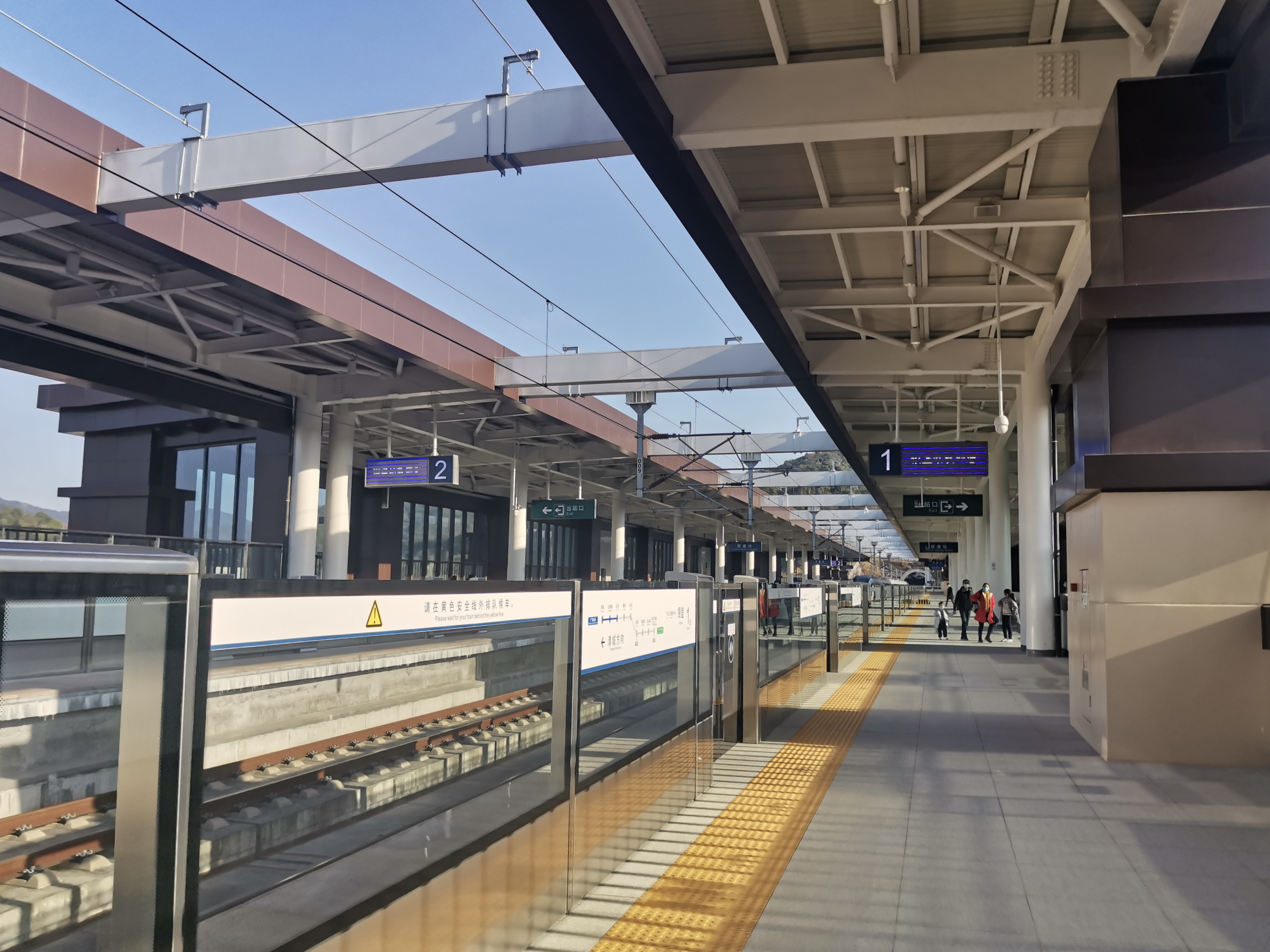
Platform

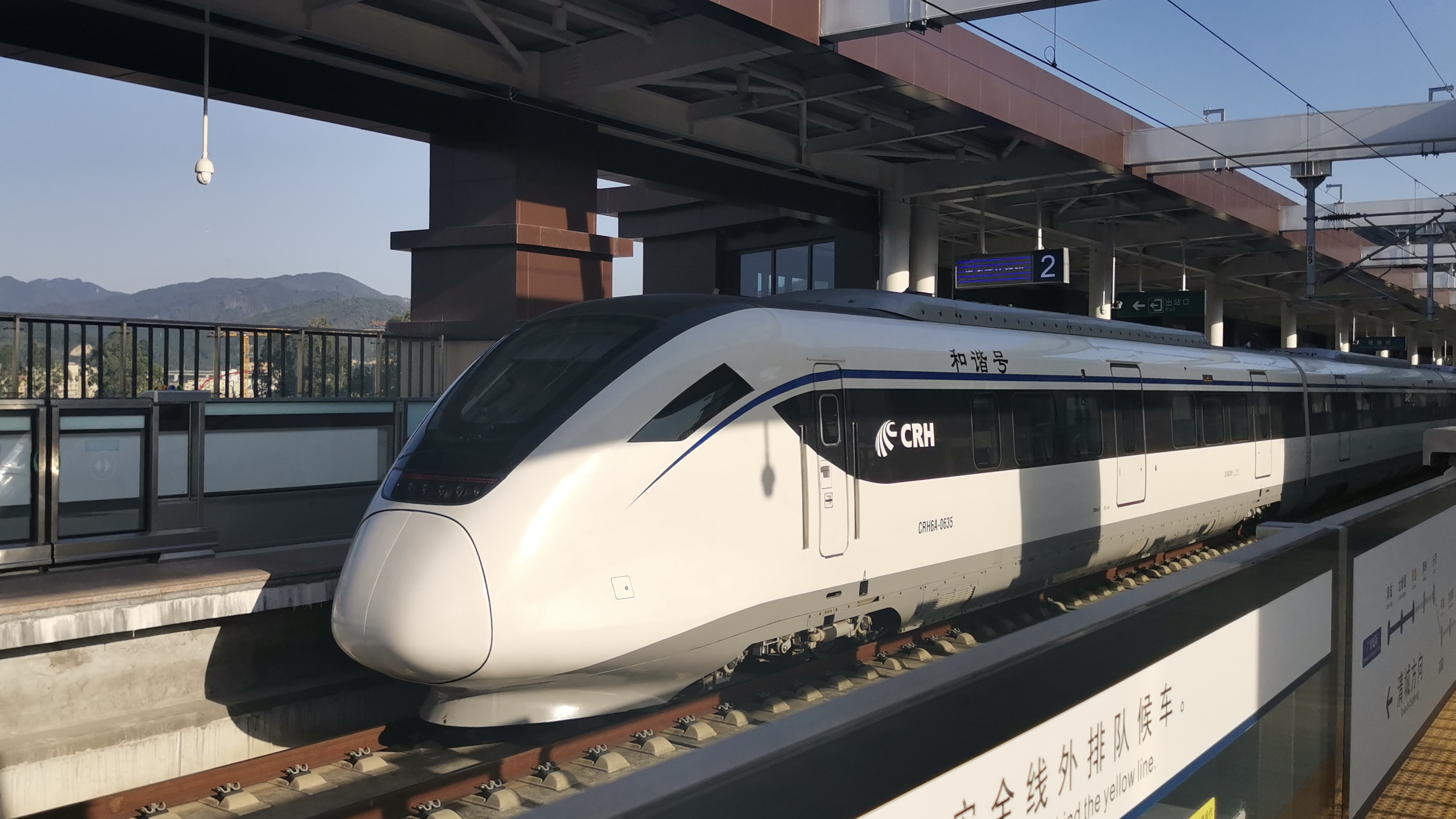
Train at platform

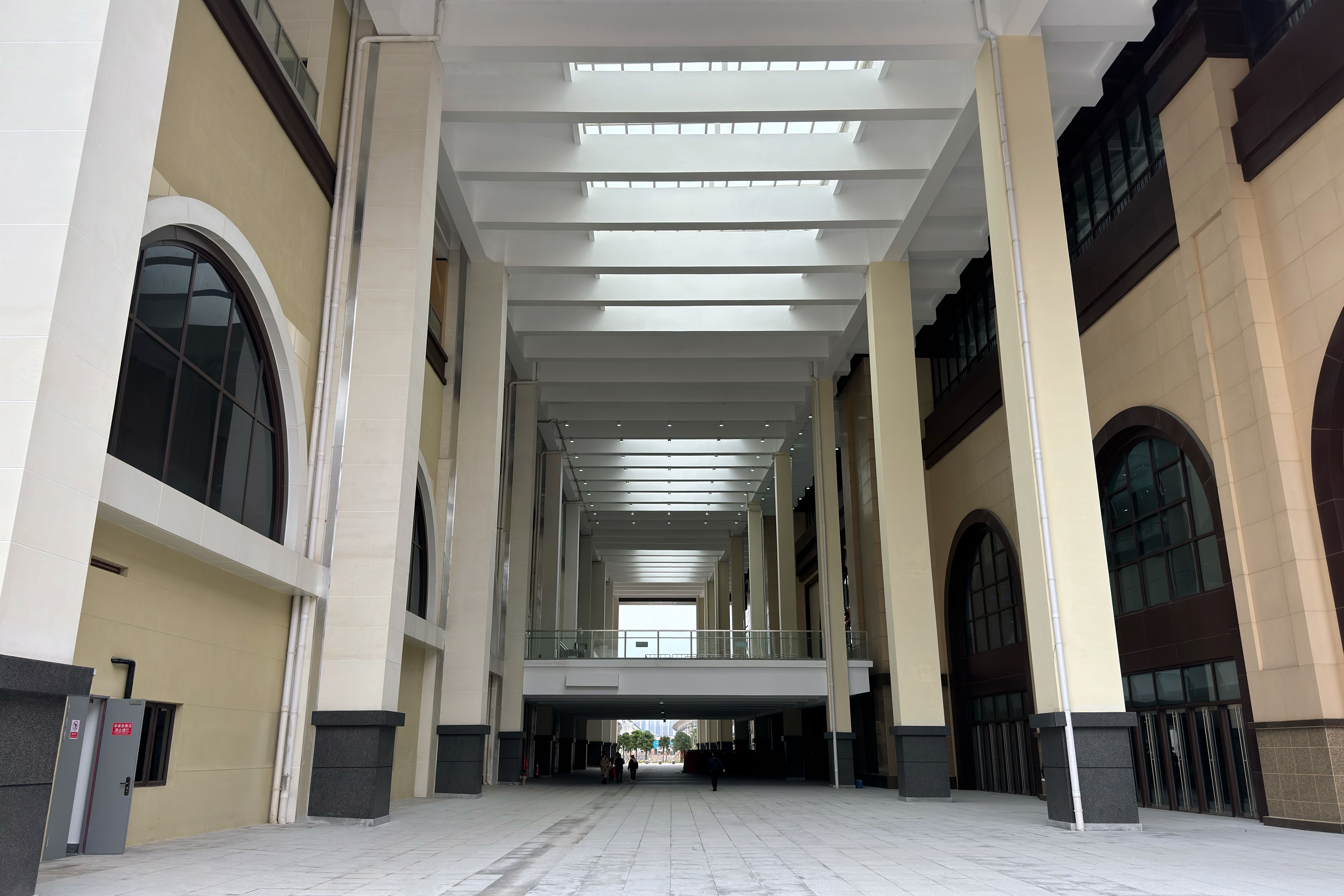
Connection between Qingyuan Chimelong and the station (February 2024)

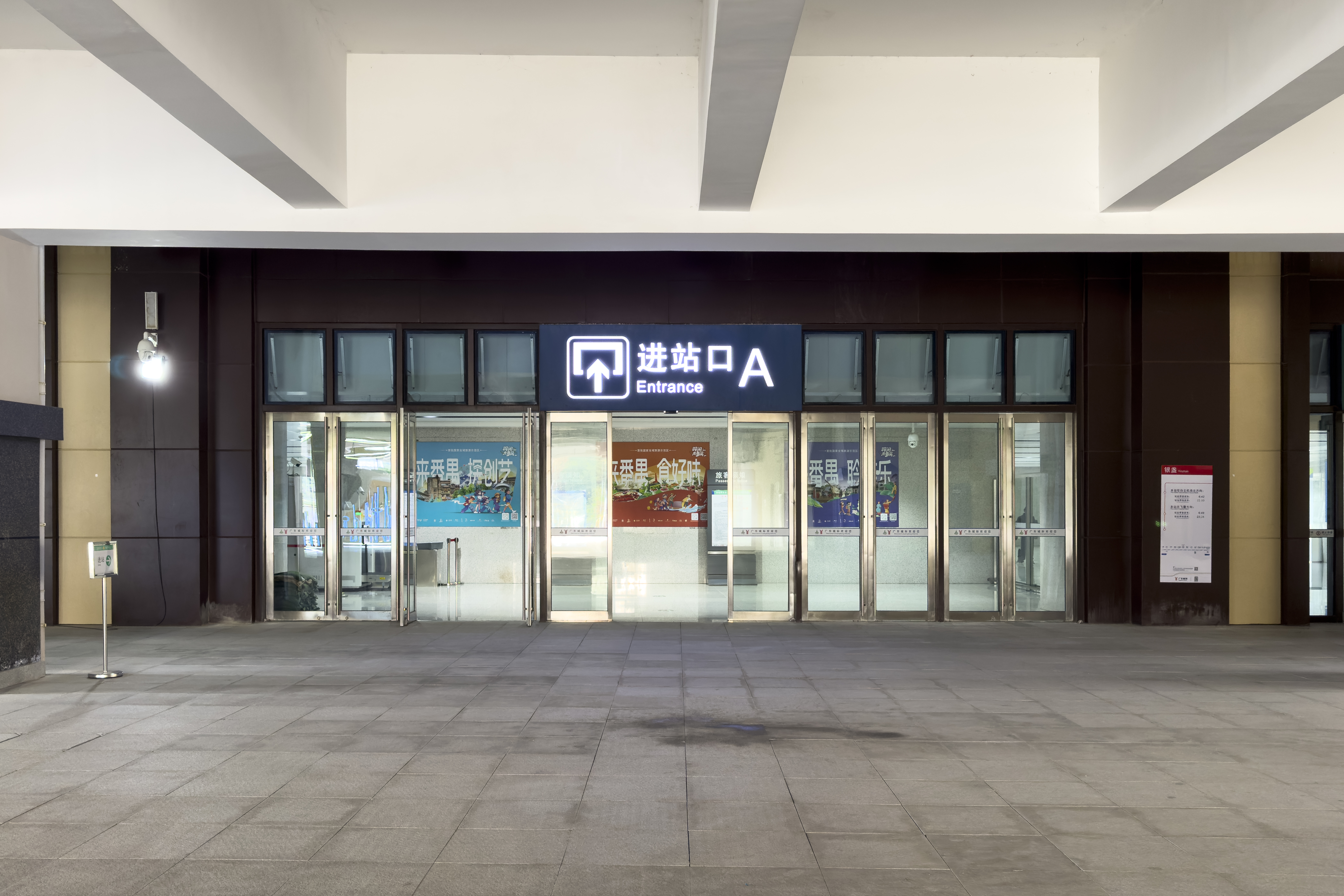
Entrance A

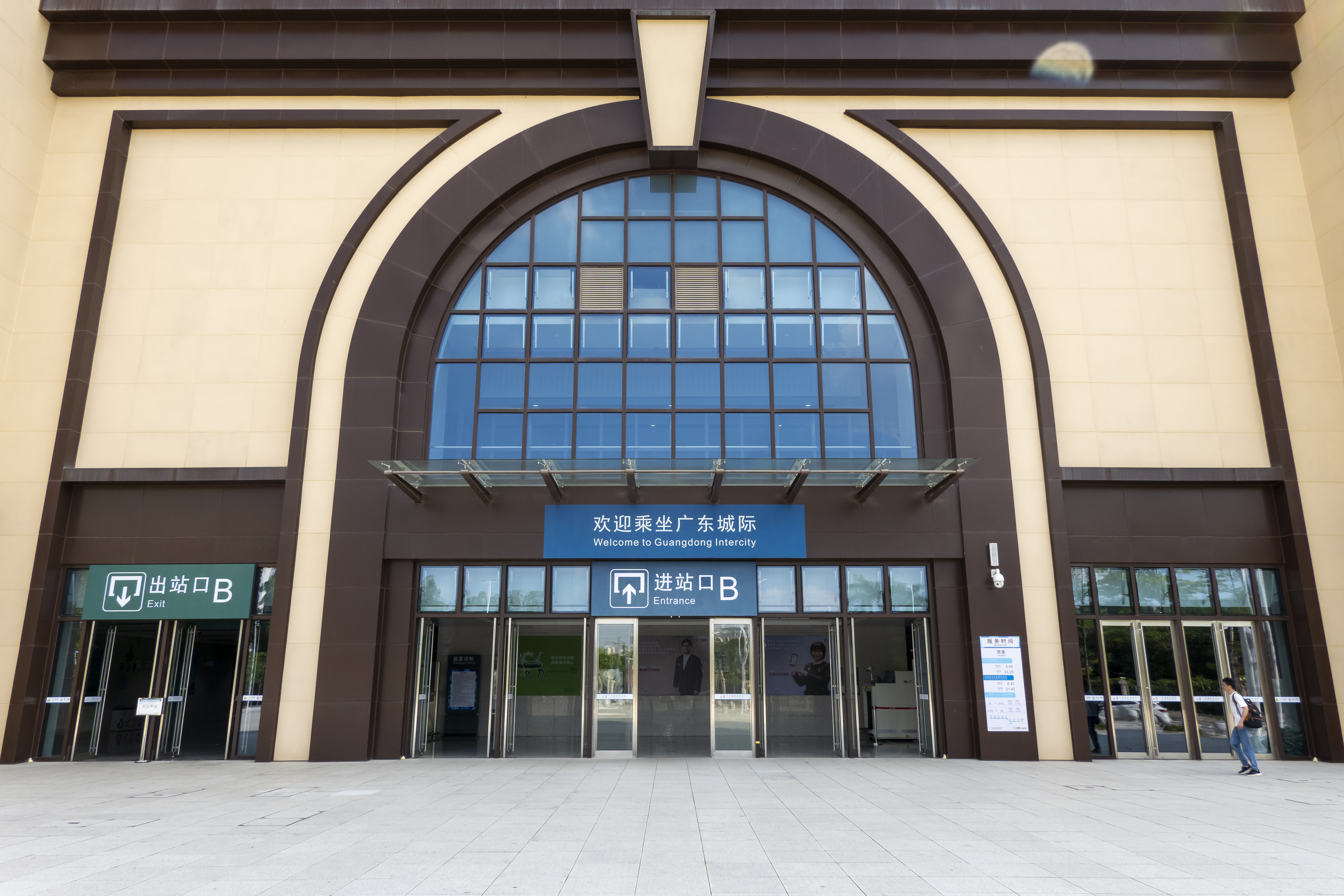
Entrance B
