= Shiling railway station =

Railway station in Huadu District, Guangzhou, China

Shiling 狮岭
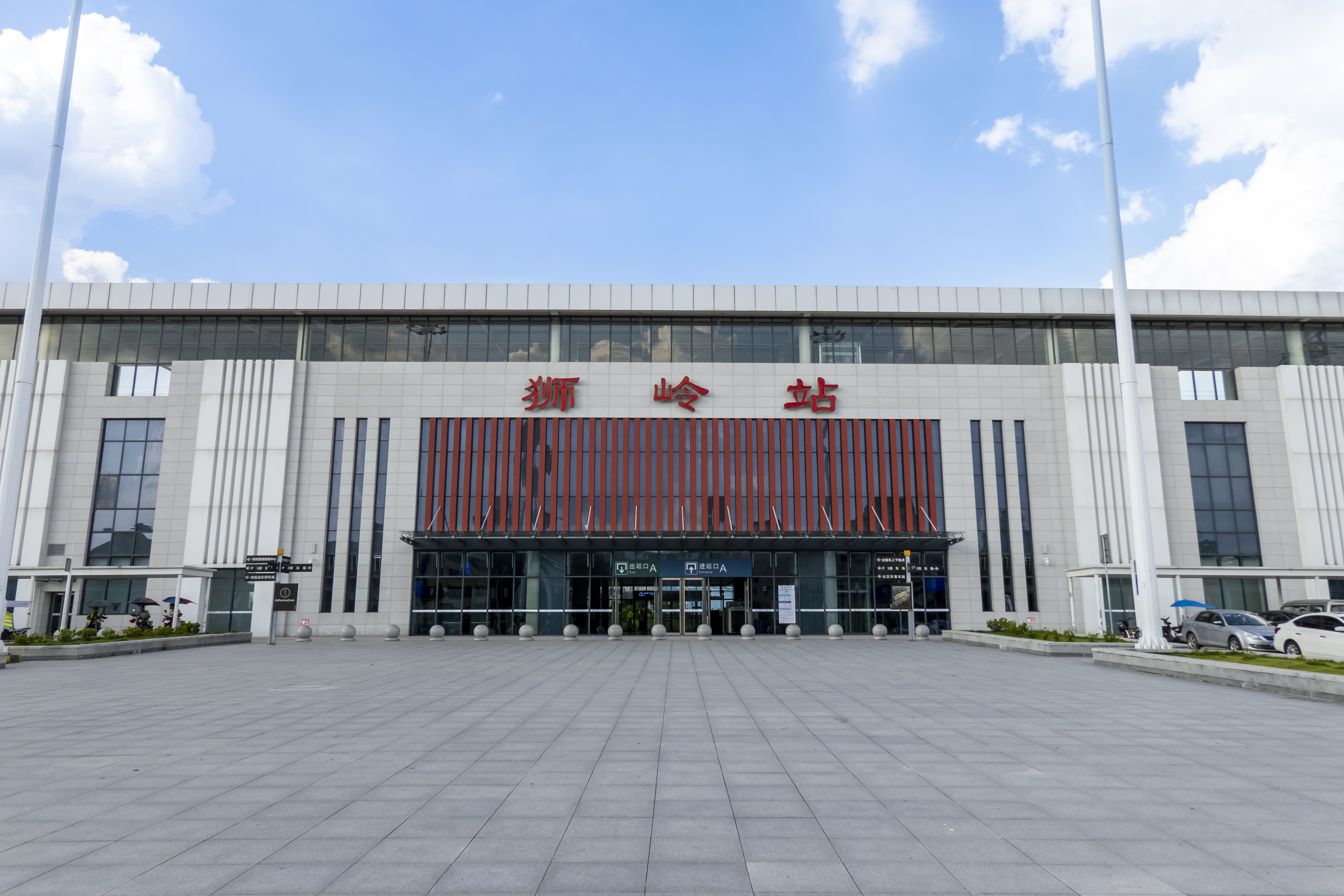
- Exterior

Chinese name
- Simplified Chinese: 狮岭站
- Traditional Chinese: 獅嶺站
Transcriptions
Standard Mandarin
- Hanyu Pinyin: Shīlǐng Zhàn
Yue: Cantonese
- Yale Romanization: Sīlíhng Jaahm
- Jyutping: Si^{1}leng^{5} Zaam^{6}

General information
- Location: Near the west end of Yongshun Road (永顺路), Juntian Village (军田村); Shiling, Huadu District, Guangzhou, Guangdong; China
- Coordinates: 23°27′24.102″N 113°8′34.624″E
- Owner: Pearl River Delta Metropolitan Region intercity railway
- Operator: Guangdong Intercity
- Line: Guangzhou–Qingyuan intercity railway
- Platforms: 2 (2 side platforms)
- Tracks: 4

Construction
- Structure type: Elevated
- Accessible: Yes

Other information
- Station code: SLA (Pinyin: SLI)

History
- Opened: 30 November 2020 (5 years ago)

Services
Preceding station	Pearl River Delta Metropolitan Region Intercity Railway	Following station
Yinzhan towards Feixia	Guangzhou–Qingyuan intercity railway	Letong towards Guangzhou Baiyun
Location

Shiling railway station (Chinese: 狮岭站; pinyin: Shīlǐng Zhàn; Cantonese Yale: Sīlíhng Jaahm) is a railway station located in Huadu District, Guangzhou, Guangdong, China. It opened on 30 November 2020.

== Features ==
The station is an elevated two-storey station with two side platforms and a crossing line, located on the south side of Juntian Station of the Beijing–Guangzhou railway, with a total building area of 7,989.5 square meters. The station building is located on the west side of the up platform. There is also a single crossing line on the north and south sides of the station, and a one-way connection line to Juntian Station of the Beijing-Guangzhou Railway in the direction of Qingcheng. This connection line is not commonly used at the moment.

== Gallery ==
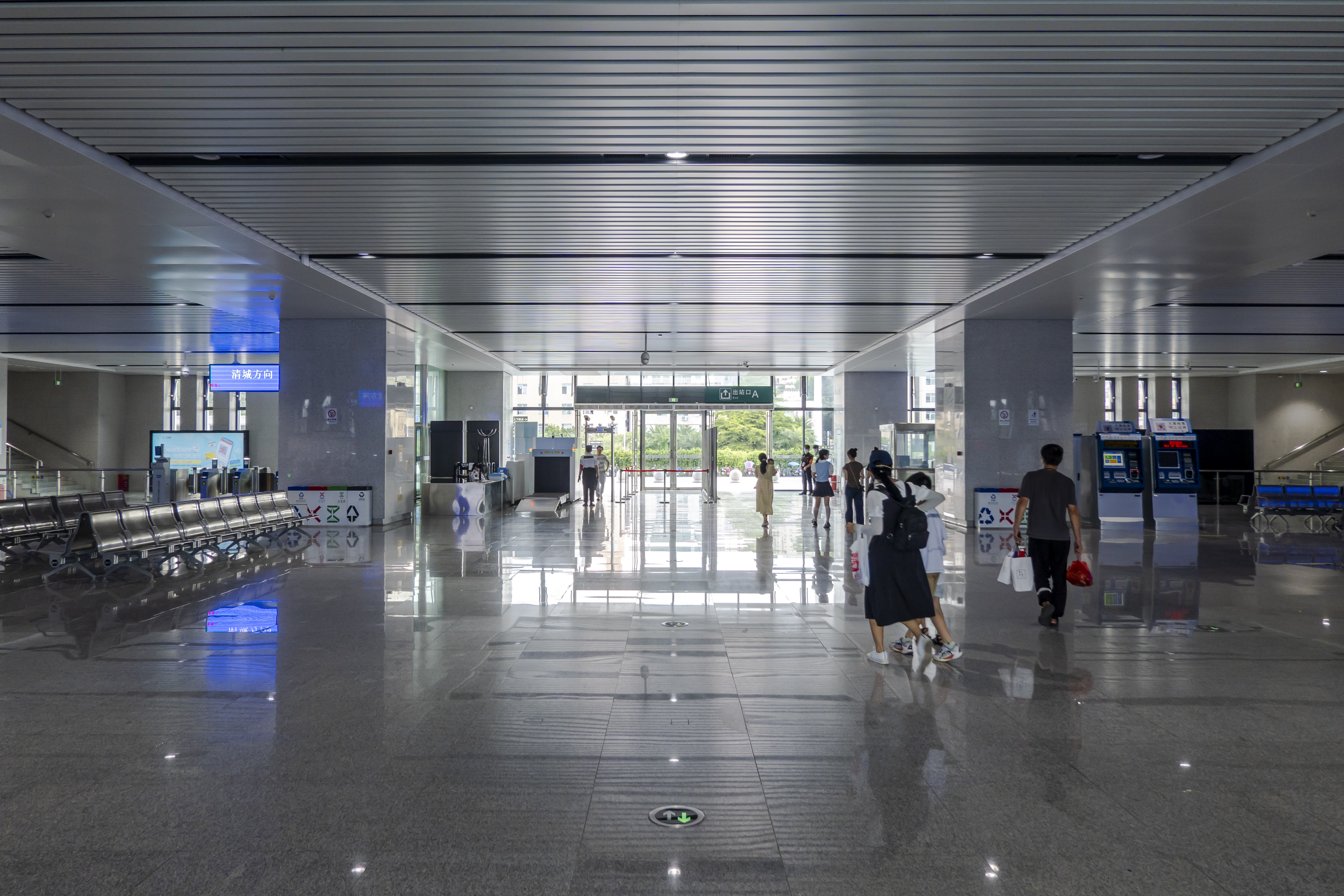
Concourse

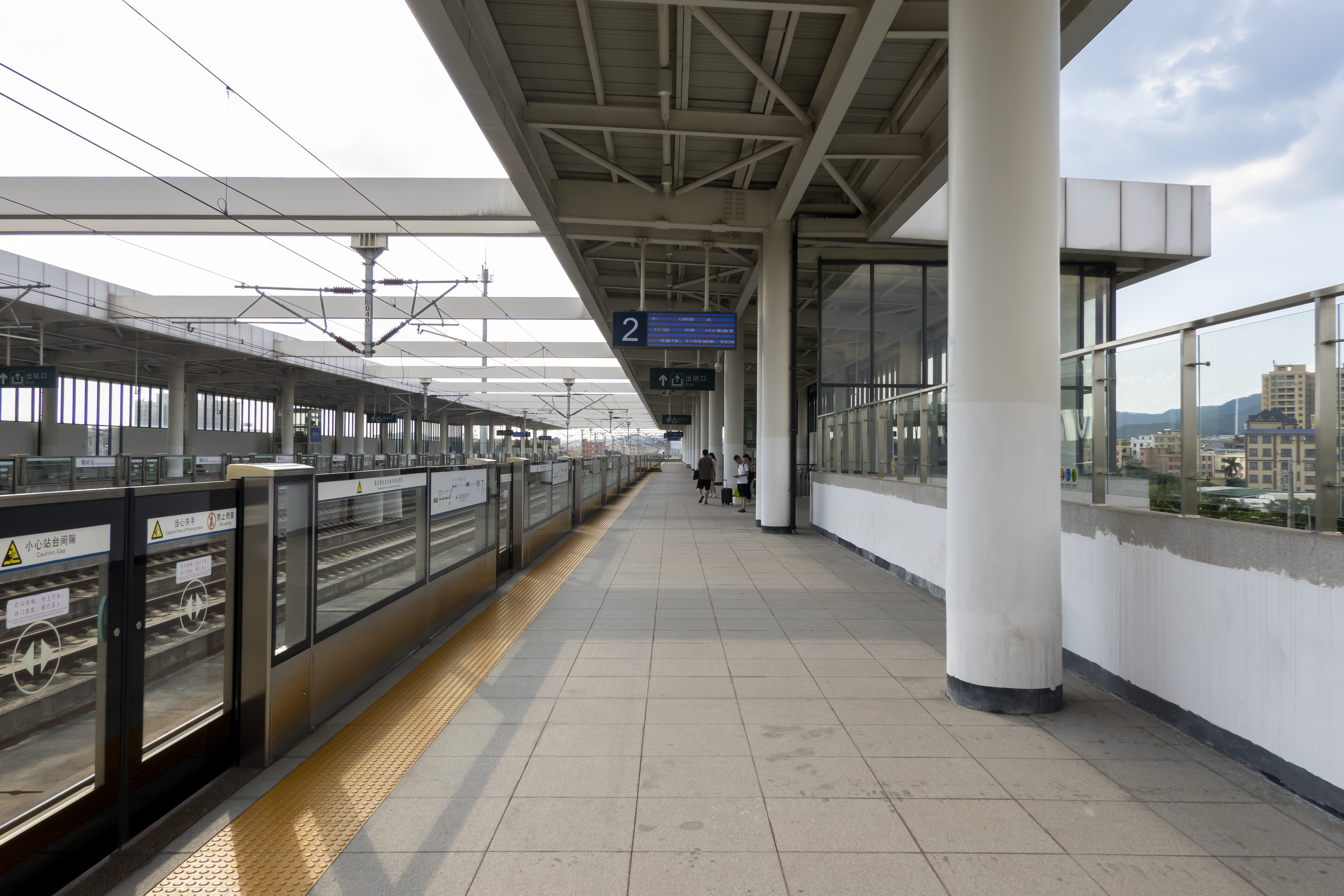
Platform

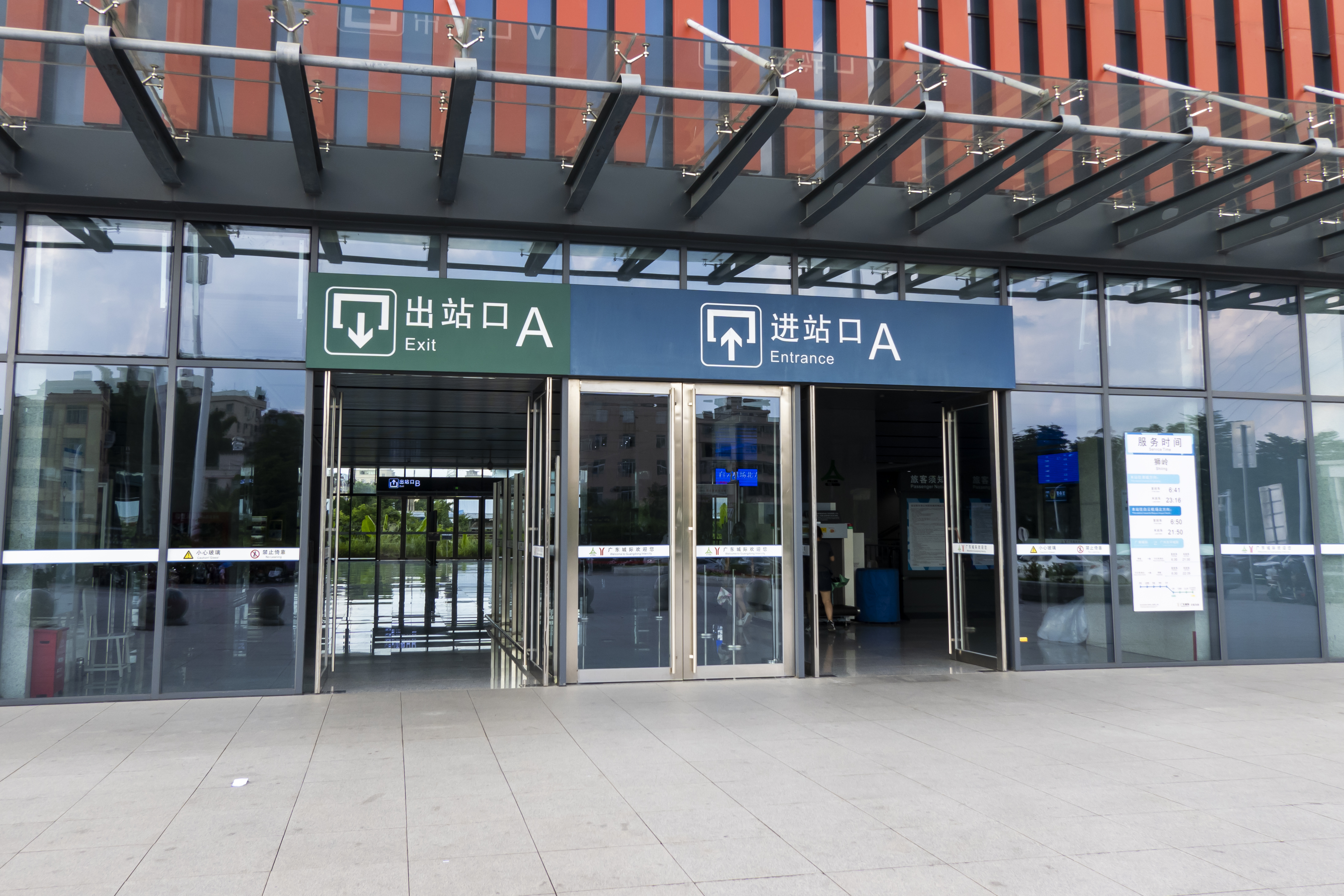
Entrance/exit A

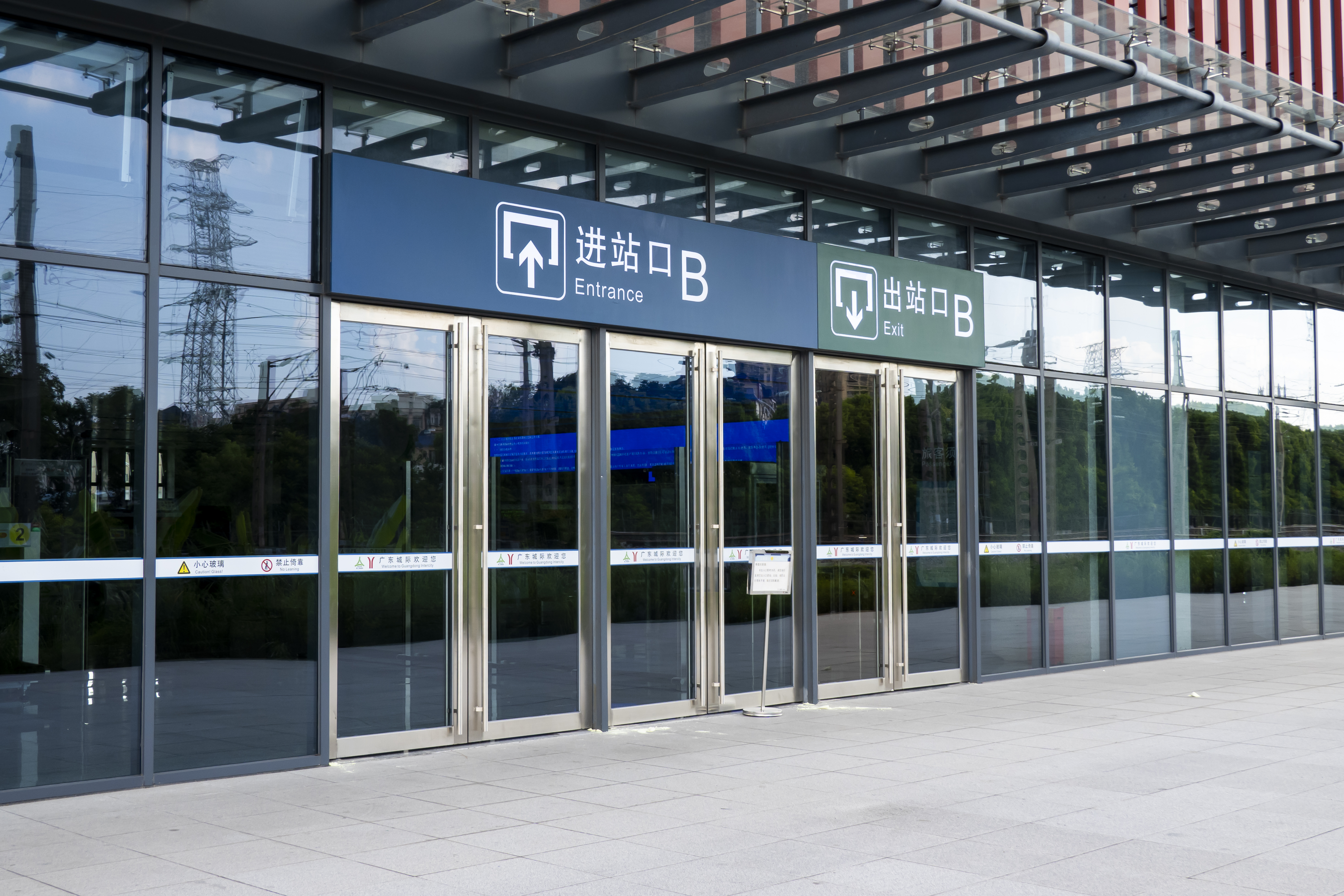
Entrance/exit B (not in use)

== History ==
Construction of the station began in May 2015, with the first pile poured on 17 June 2015, and the last section of the platform layer poured on 15 October 2016.

On 30 November 2020, the station opened with the opening of the Guangzhou-Qingyuan Intercity Railway.

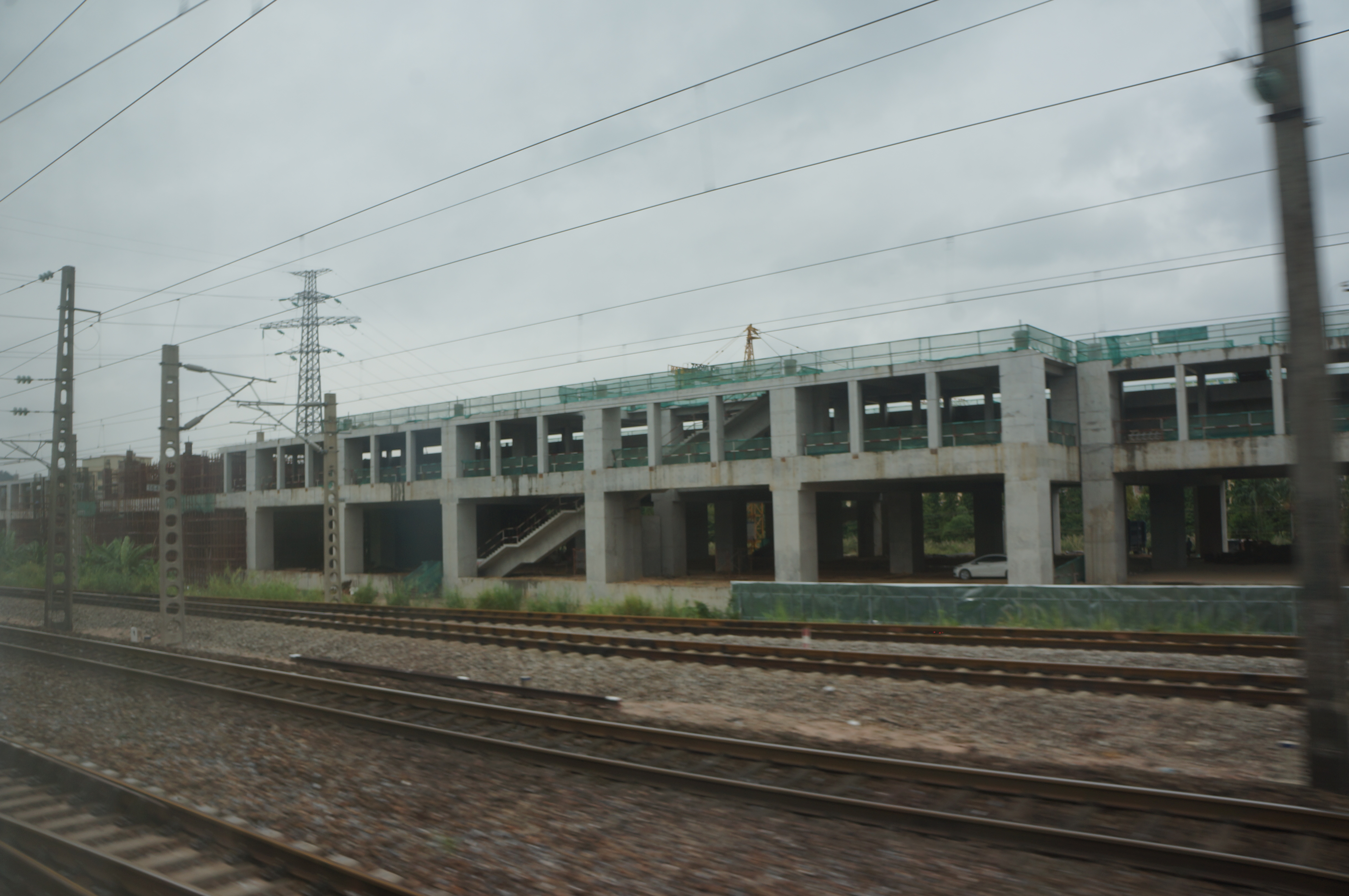
Station under construction (September 2016)
