= Letong railway station =

Railway station in Huadu District, Guangzhou, China

Letong 乐同
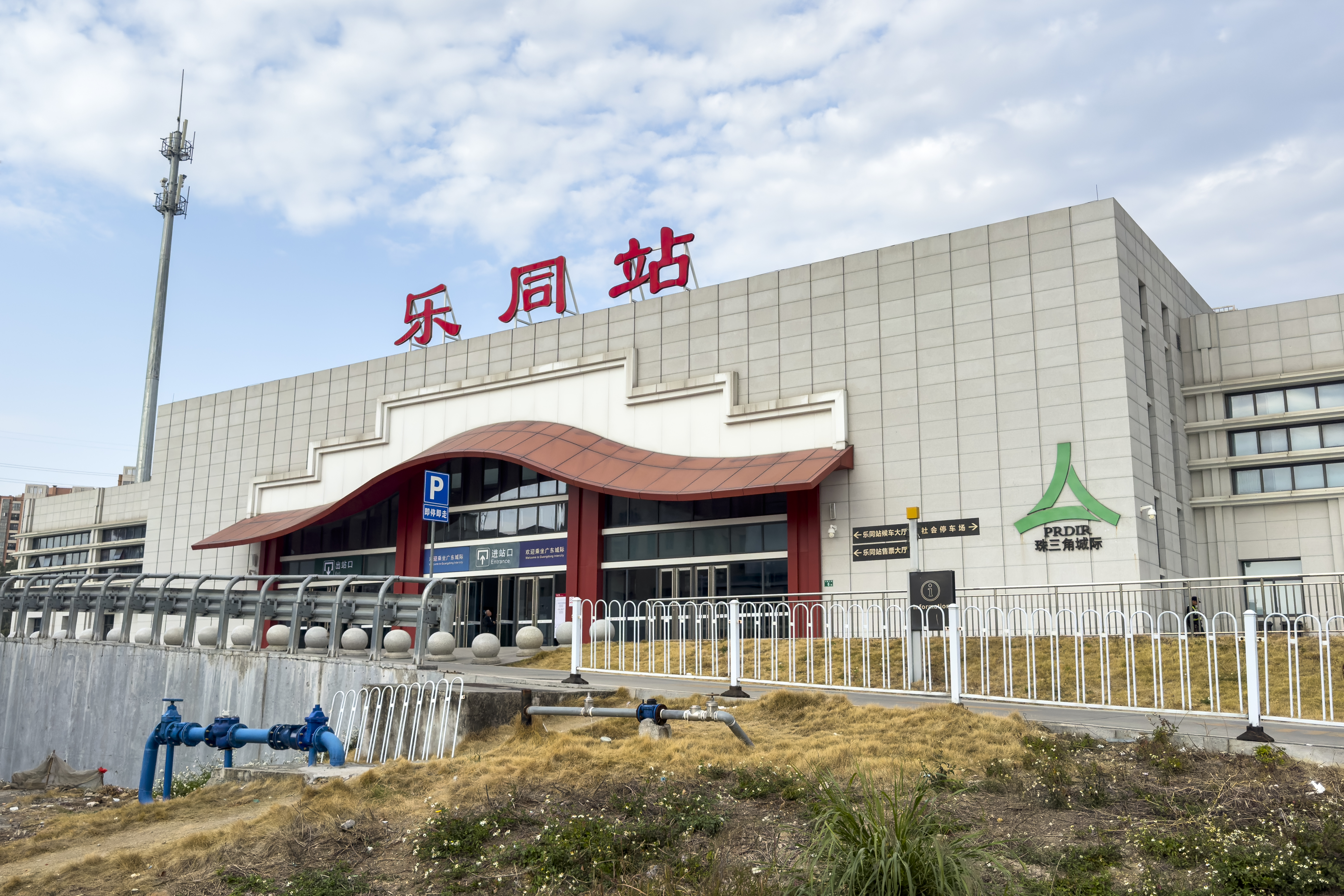
- Exterior

Chinese name
- Simplified Chinese: 乐同站
- Traditional Chinese: 樂同站
Transcriptions
Standard Mandarin
- Hanyu Pinyin: Lètóng Zhàn
Yue: Cantonese
- Yale Romanization: Lohktùhng Jaahm
- Jyutping: Lok^{6}tung^{4} Zaam^{6}

General information
- Location: In the Shipi Cooperative (石陂合作社) in Letong Village (乐同村); Xiuquan Subdistrict, Huadu District, Guangzhou, Guangdong; China
- Coordinates: 23°25′34.007″N 113°10′11.406″E
- Owner: Pearl River Delta Metropolitan Region intercity railway
- Operator: Guangdong Intercity
- Line: Guangzhou–Qingyuan intercity railway
- Platforms: 2 (2 side platforms)
- Tracks: 2

Construction
- Structure type: Elevated
- Accessible: Yes

Other information
- Station code: LTA (Pinyin: LTO)

History
- Opened: 30 November 2020 (5 years ago)

Services
| Preceding station | Pearl River Delta Metropolitan Region Intercity Railway | Following station |
|---|---|---|
| Shiling towards Feixia | Guangzhou–Qingyuan intercity railway | Huadu towards Guangzhou Baiyun |
Location

Letong railway station (Chinese: 乐同站; pinyin: Lètóng Zhàn; Cantonese Yale: Lohktùhng Jaahm) is a railway station located in Huadu District, Guangzhou, Guangdong, China. It opened on 30 November 2020.

== Gallery ==
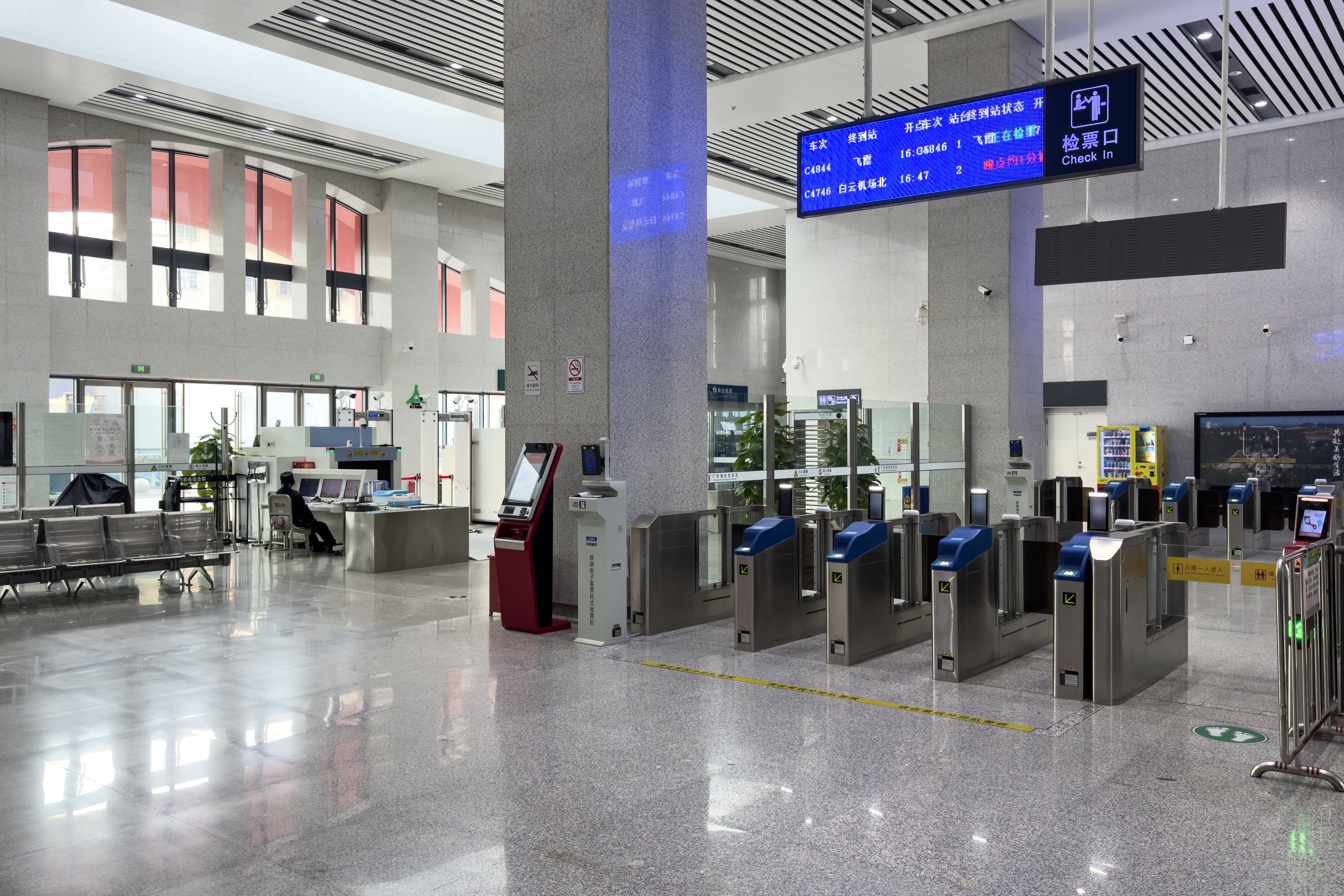
Station building interior/concourse

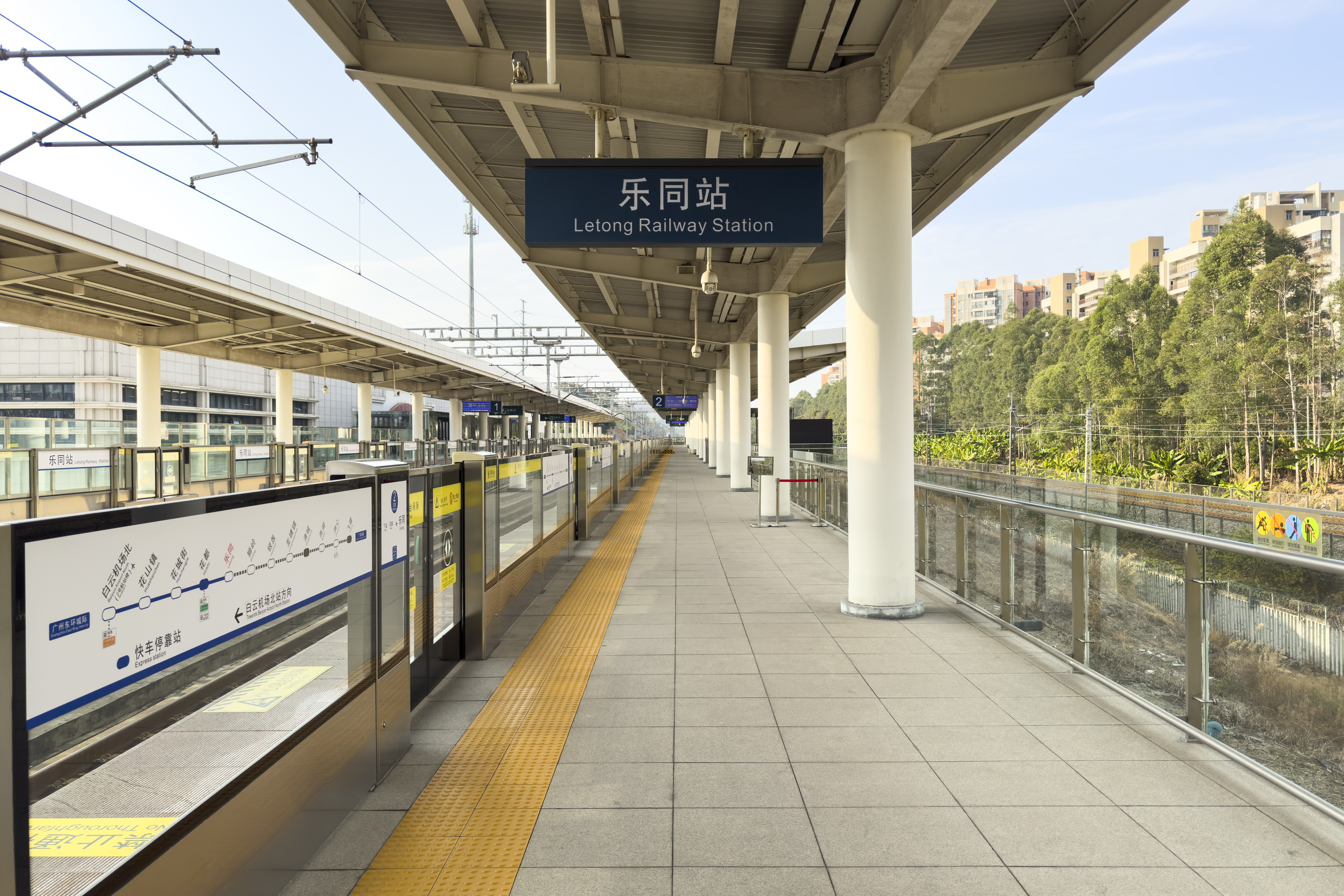
Platform 2

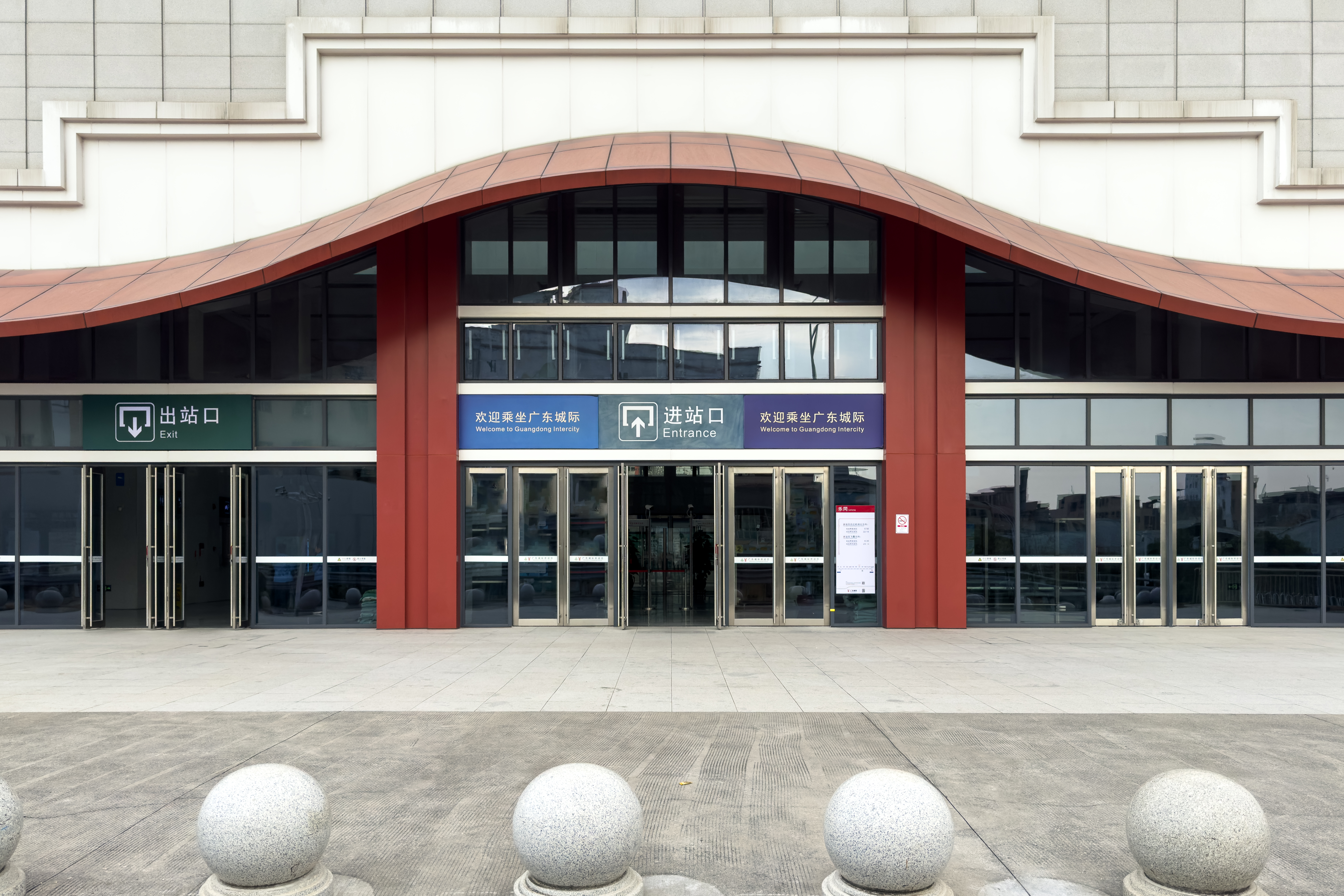
Entrance/exit

== History ==
The Beijing–Guangzhou railway once had a "Letong Station" between Juntian Station and Huadu Station (Guangzhou North railway station), which began to operate as early as the opening of the Guangshao section of the Guangzhou–Hankou railway. In 1934, there were four timetabled services on the timetable. The Hengguang Railway was abolished on 30 September 1988 after the line was double tracked. There are still line stations left, with two guard posts.

This station was originally planned to be named Automobile Institute and originally planned to branch from the station to the current Baiyun Airport North station, and later the branch line was included in the new Baiguang City Railway project. Later, the station name was changed to Shibei, and the construction of the main body and ancillary facilities was completed on October 20, 2017. In 2020, it was named Letong. On 30 November the same year, the station opened with the opening of the Guangzhou-Qingyuan Intercity Railway.

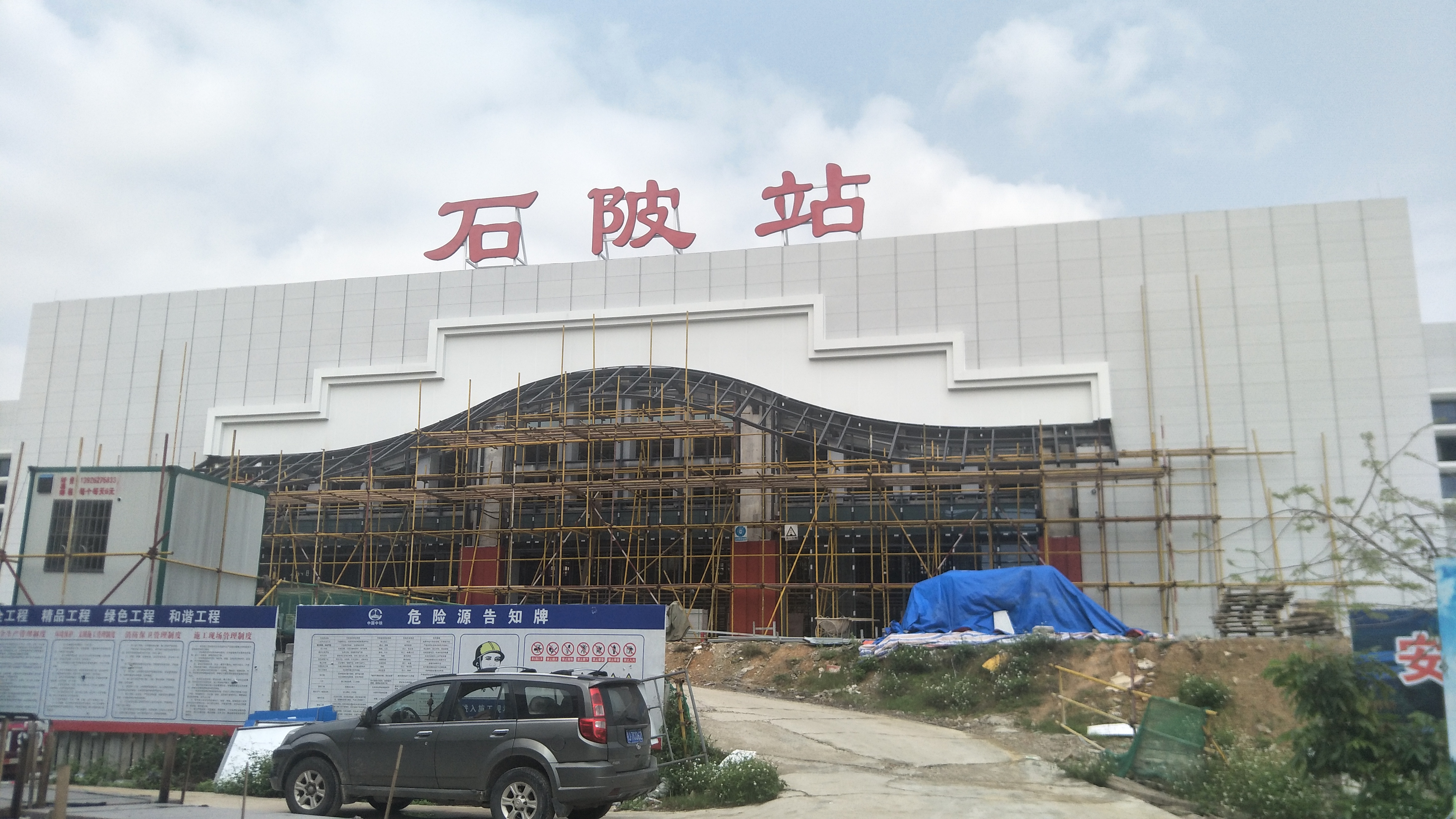
The station during construction, then called Shibei

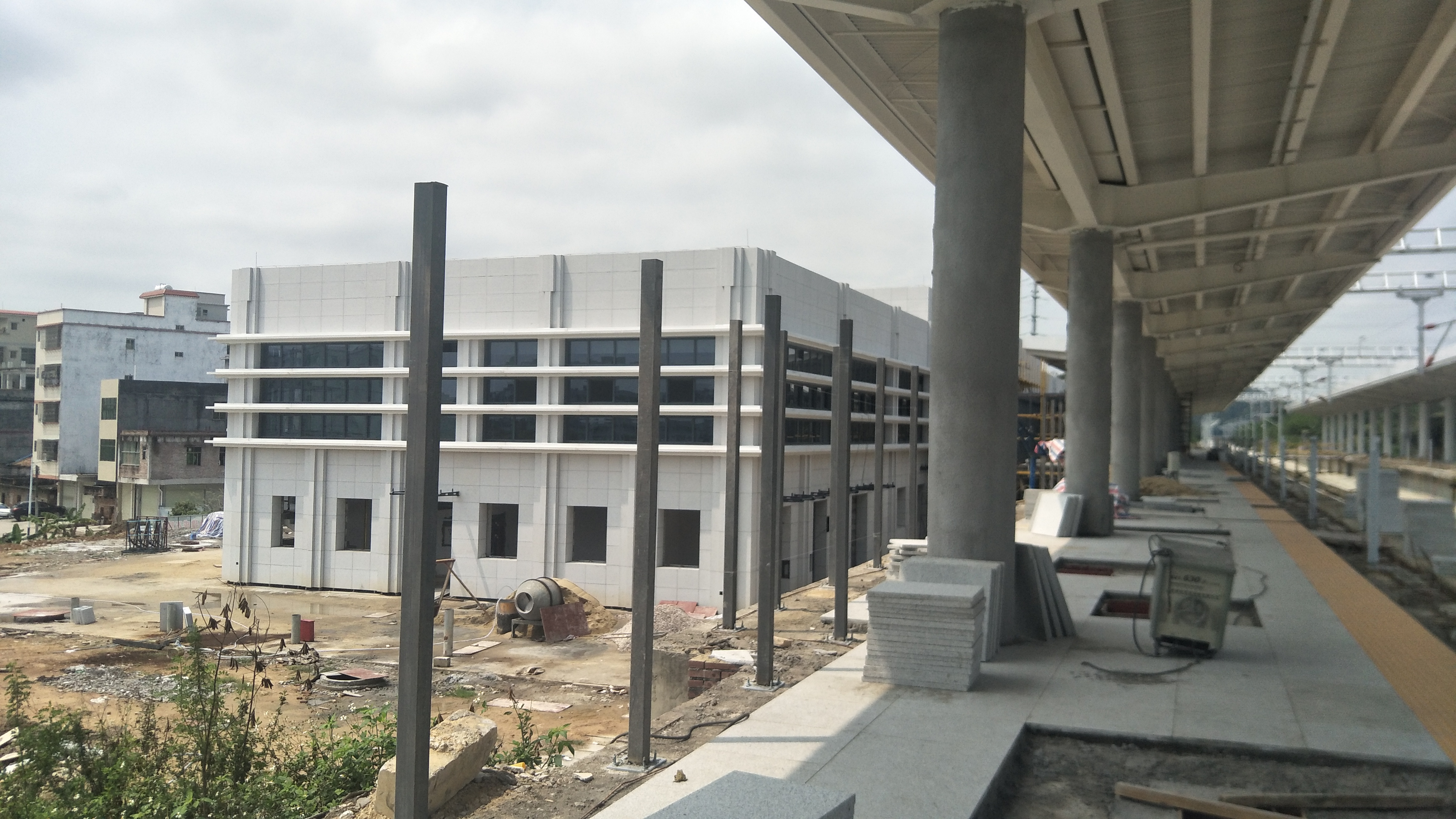
Under construction northbound platform
