= Qingcheng railway station =

Qingcheng railway station may refer to:

- Qingcheng railway station (Guangdong) (清城站), a station on Guangzhou–Qingyuan intercity railway in Qingcheng District, Qingyuan, Guangdong Province, China
- Qingcheng railway station (Gansu) (庆城站), a station on Yinchuan–Xi'an high-speed railway in Qingcheng County, Gansu Province, China

== See also ==
- Qingsheng railway station (庆盛站), in Guangzhou, Guangdong Province, China
- Qingchengshan railway station (青城山站), in Dujiangyan, Chengdu, Sichuan Province, China
