= Yanhu railway station =

Intercity railway station in Qingyuan, China

Yanhu 燕湖
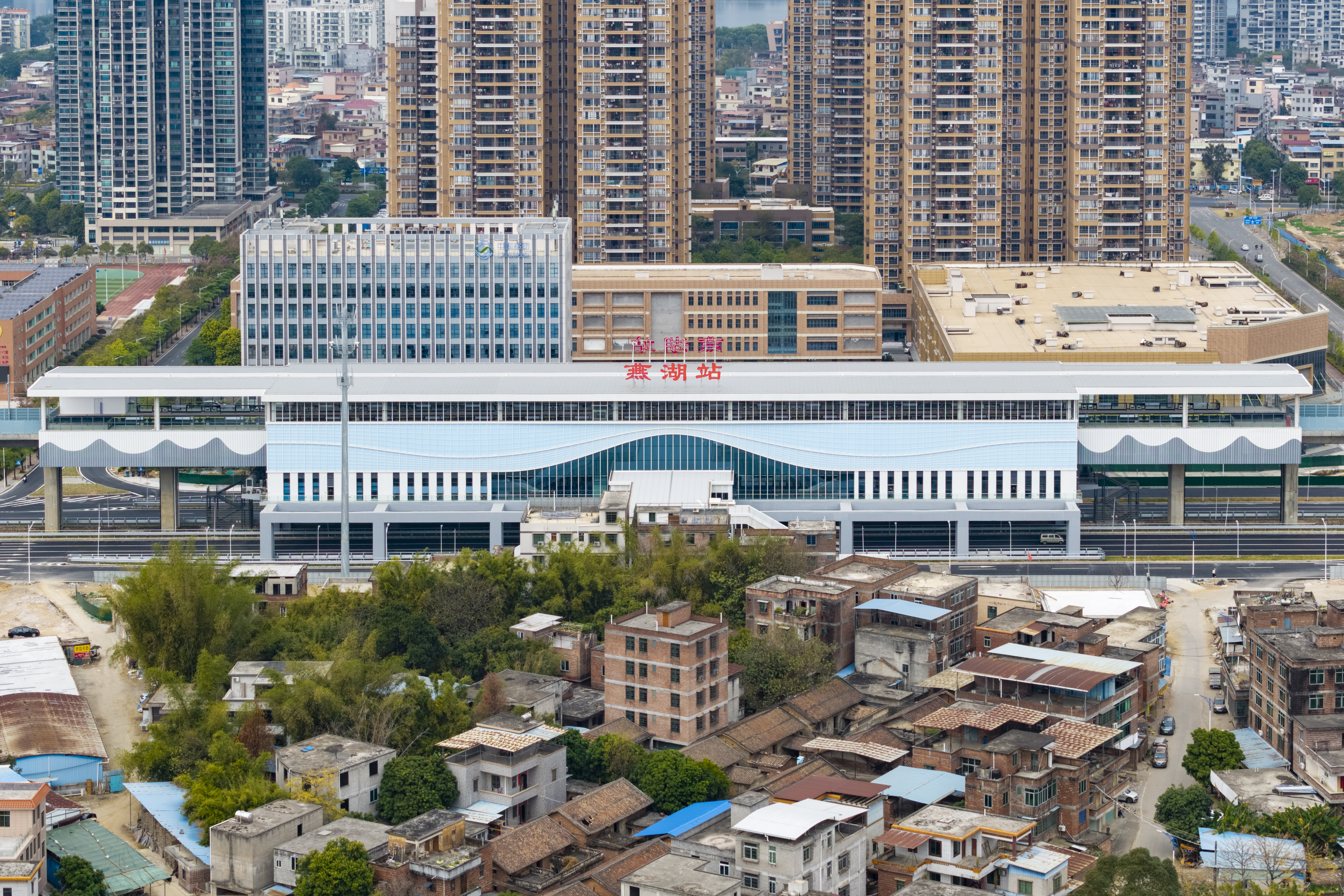
- Exterior

Chinese name
- Chinese: 燕湖站
Transcriptions
Standard Mandarin
- Hanyu Pinyin: Yànhú Zhàn
Yue: Cantonese
- Yale Romanization: Yinwù Jaahm
- Jyutping: Jin^{3}wu^{4} Zaam^{6}

General information
- Location: Between the intersection of Qingyuan Boulevard (清远大道), Lianshui Road (连水路) and Qinglian Road (青联路); Zhouxin Subdistrict, Qingcheng District, Qingyuan, Guangdong; China
- Coordinates: 23°40′22.379″N 113°5′3.037″E
- Owner: Pearl River Delta Metropolitan Region intercity railway
- Operator: Guangdong Intercity
- Line: Guangzhou–Qingyuan intercity railway
- Platforms: 2 (2 side platforms)
- Tracks: 2

Construction
- Structure type: Elevated
- Accessible: Yes

Other information
- Station code: YHA (Pinyin: YHU)

History
- Opened: 28 December 2024 (19 months ago)
- Former names: Yanhu New Town (燕湖新城)

Services
Preceding station	Pearl River Delta Metropolitan Region Intercity Railway	Following station
Zhouxin towards Feixia	Guangzhou–Qingyuan intercity railway	Qingcheng towards Guangzhou Baiyun
Location

Yanhu railway station (Chinese: 燕湖站; pinyin: Yànhú Zhàn; Cantonese Yale: Yinwù Jaahm) is a railway station located in Qingcheng District, Qingyuan, Guangdong, China. It opened on 28 December 2024.

== Features ==
The station is an elevated three-storey station with two side platforms and a construction area of 14,431 square meters. It has 4 points of entry/exit.

=== Entrances/exits ===
- A1: Qingyuan Boulevard
- A2: Qingyuan Boulevard, Qingyuan Museum
- B1: Qingyuan Boulevard, Qingcheng District No. 2 Primary School
- B2: Qingyuan Boulevard

== Gallery ==
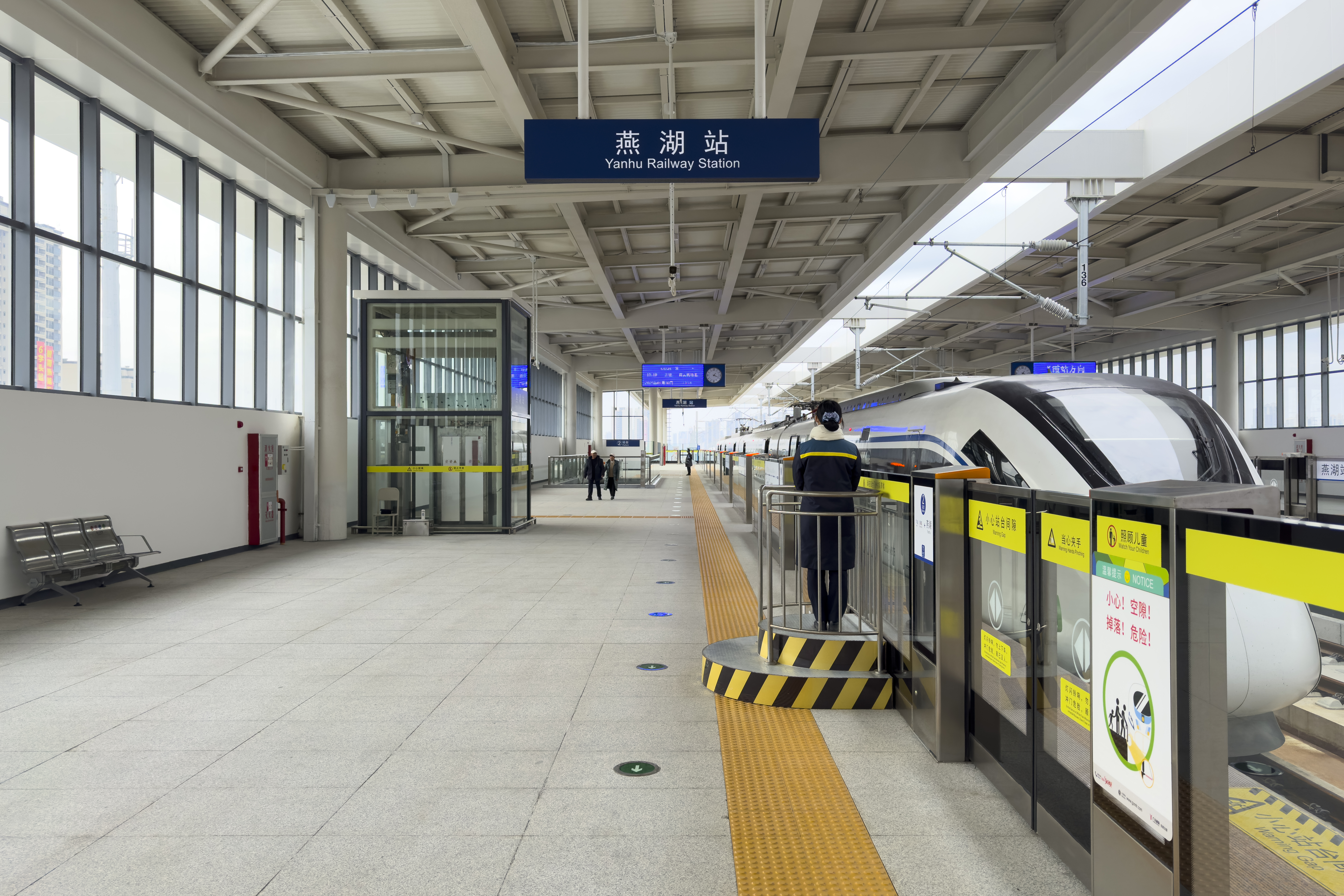
Platform 2

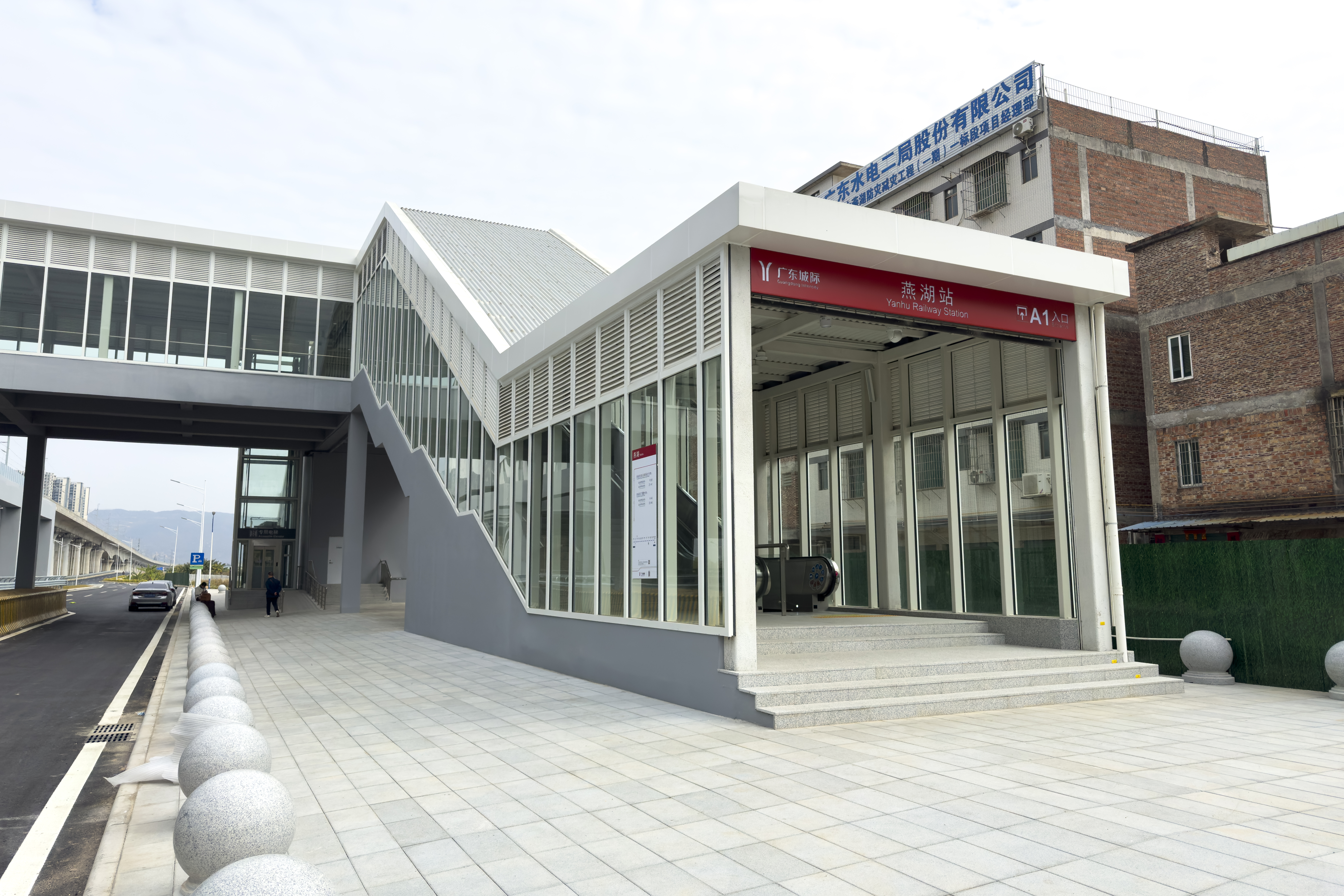
Entrance A1

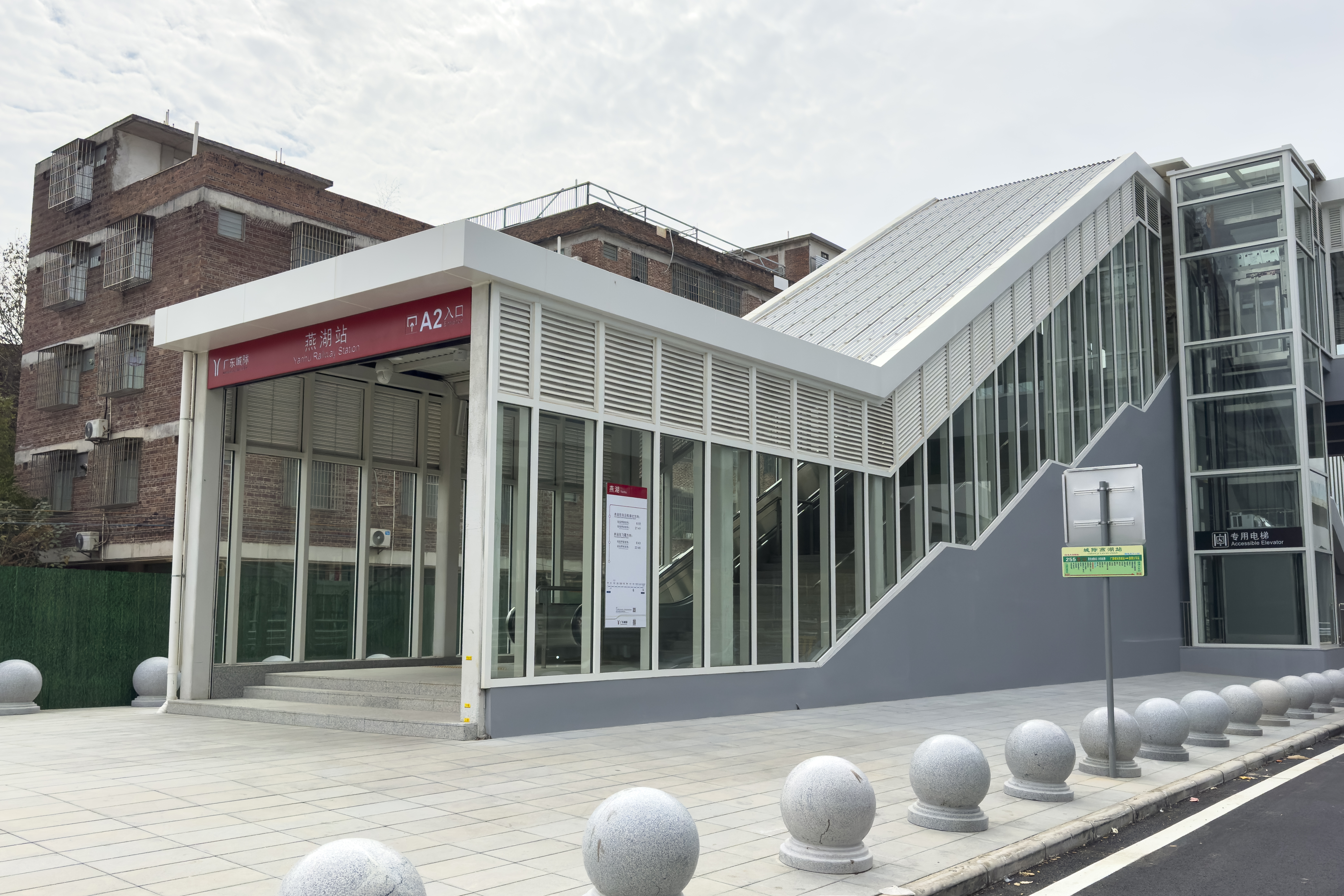
Entrance A2

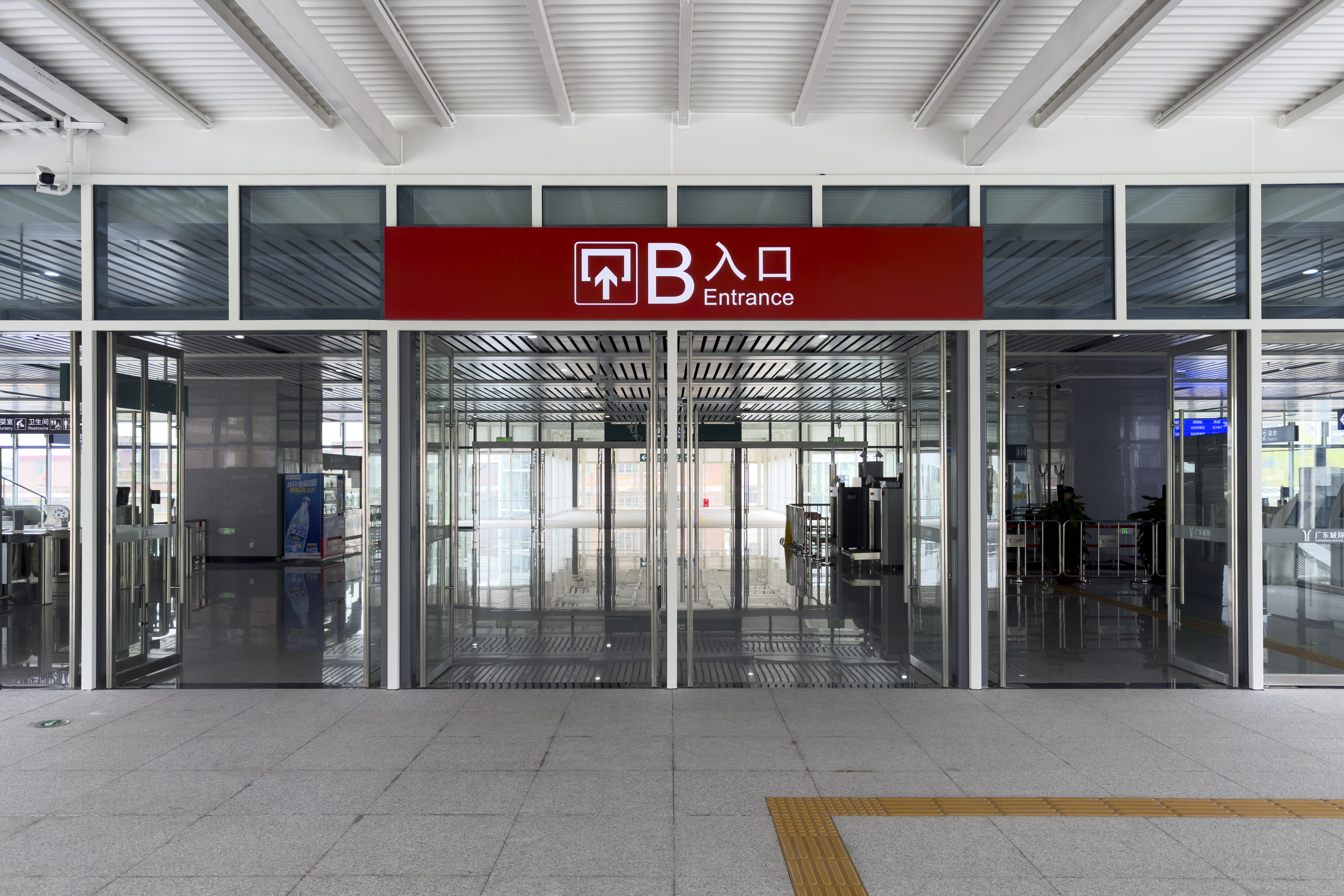
Entrance B

== History ==
As a transportation hub for Qingyuan Yanhu New Town, this station was called Yanhu New Town station during the planning and construction phase. The main structure of the station was topped out in September 2022.

In 2024, the station was renamed to Yanhu station according to the area where it is located. On 28 December, it was put into use with the opening of the northern extension of the Guangzhou–Qingyuan intercity railway.
