= Qingcheng railway station (Guangdong) =

Railway station in Qingyuan, China

Qingcheng 清城
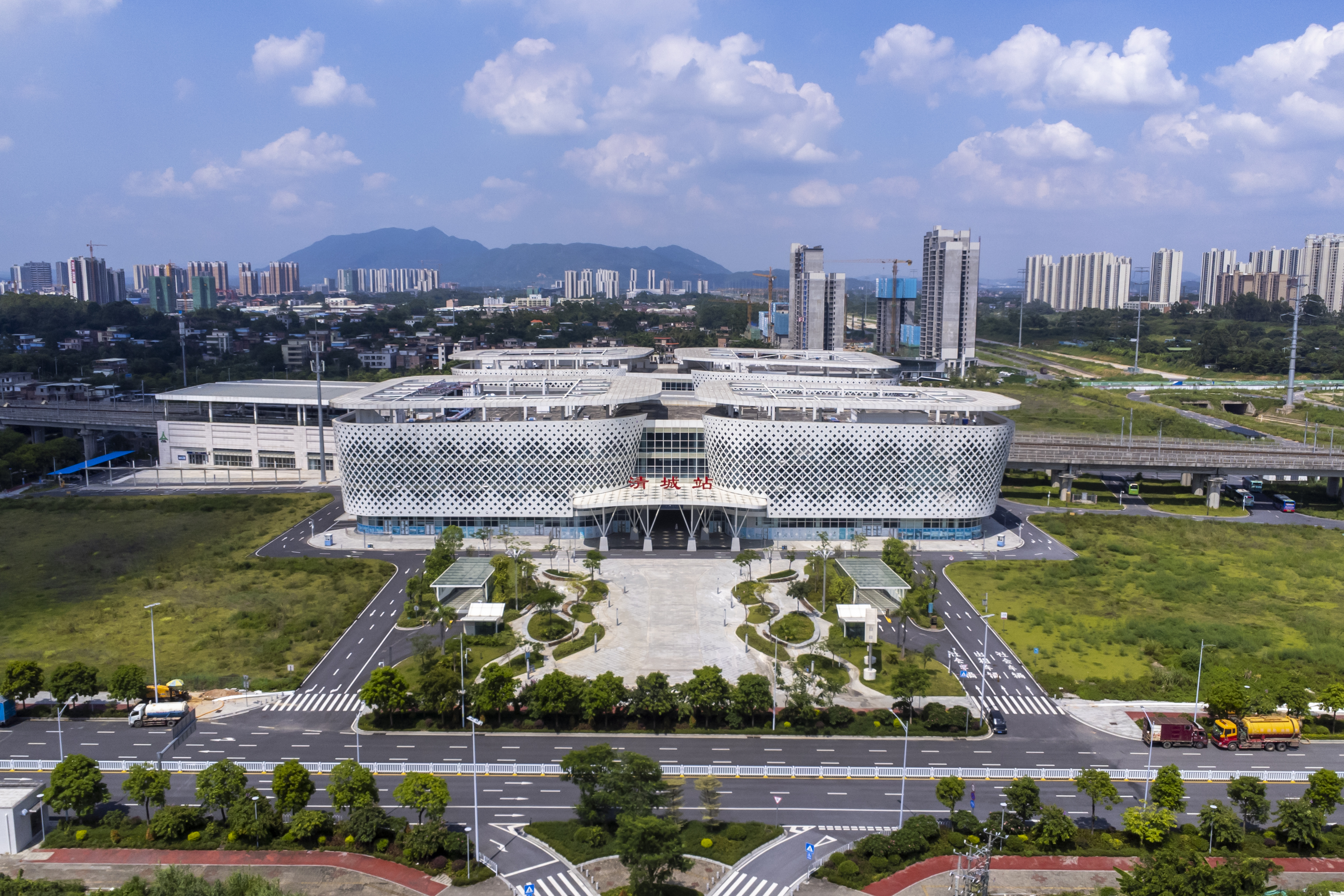
- Exterior with transport interchange at the forefront

Chinese name
- Chinese: 清城站
Transcriptions
Standard Mandarin
- Hanyu Pinyin: Qīngchéng Zhàn
Yue: Cantonese
- Yale Romanization: Chīngsìhng Jaahm
- Jyutping: Cing^{1}sing^{4} Zaam^{6}

General information
- Location: Northwest side of intersection of Hucheng Boulevard (湖城大道) and Fenghuang South Road (凤翔南路); Zhouxin Subdistrict, Qingcheng District, Qingyuan, Guangdong; China
- Coordinates: 23°39′21.272″N 113°3′38.772″E
- Owner: Pearl River Delta Metropolitan Region intercity railway
- Operator: Guangdong Intercity
- Line: Guangzhou–Qingyuan intercity railway
- Platforms: 4 (2 island platforms)
- Tracks: 4

Construction
- Structure type: Elevated
- Accessible: Yes

Other information
- Station code: QCA (Pinyin: QCH)

History
- Opened: 30 November 2020 (5 years ago)

Services
| Preceding station | Pearl River Delta Metropolitan Region Intercity Railway | Following station |
|---|---|---|
| Yanhu towards Feixia | Guangzhou–Qingyuan intercity railway | Longtangzhen towards Guangzhou Baiyun |
Location

Qingcheng railway station (Chinese: 清城站; pinyin: Qīngchéng Zhàn; Cantonese Yale: Chīngsìhng Jaahm) is a railway station located in Qingcheng District, Qingyuan, Guangdong, China. It opened with the Guangzhou–Qingyuan intercity railway on 30 November 2020. It was the northern terminus of the line until the extension to Feixia opened on 28 December 2024.

== Features ==
The station is an elevated two-storey four track station with two island platforms. It has 2 points of entry/exit.

=== Entrances/exits ===
- A: Guangqing Boulevard
- B: Fengxiang Road Middle

=== Supporting commercial buildings ===
The station has two supporting commercial buildings, distributed on the east and west sides of the station, with two underground floors and four above ground floors. Construction of the buildings began in May 2018, topped out in July 2019, and completed their acceptance in April 2022. However, up to now, the commercial buildings not been settled by merchants and is not open to the public. In 2024, EasyHome will acquire the buildings and open a large home furnishing mall.

== Gallery ==
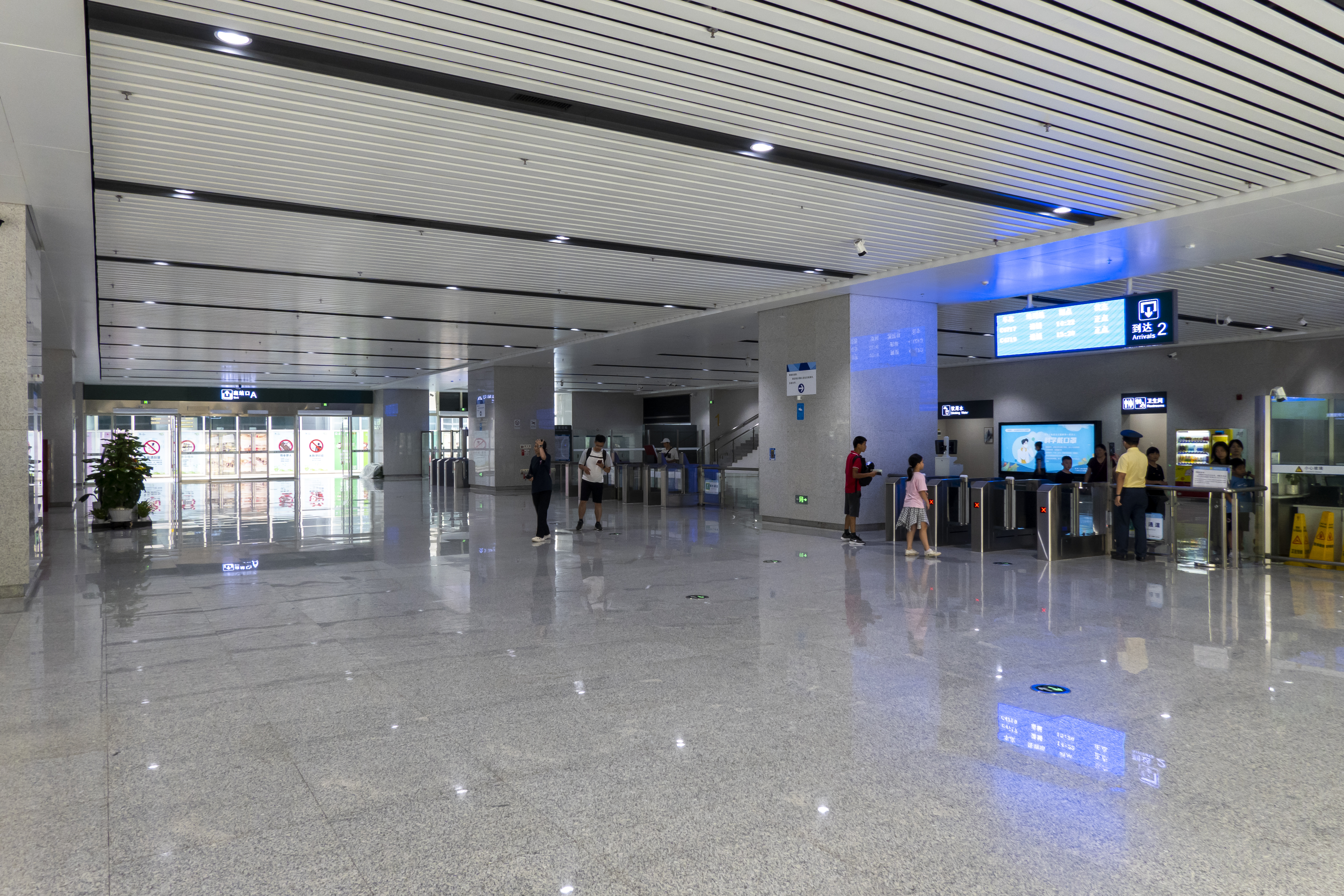
Concourse

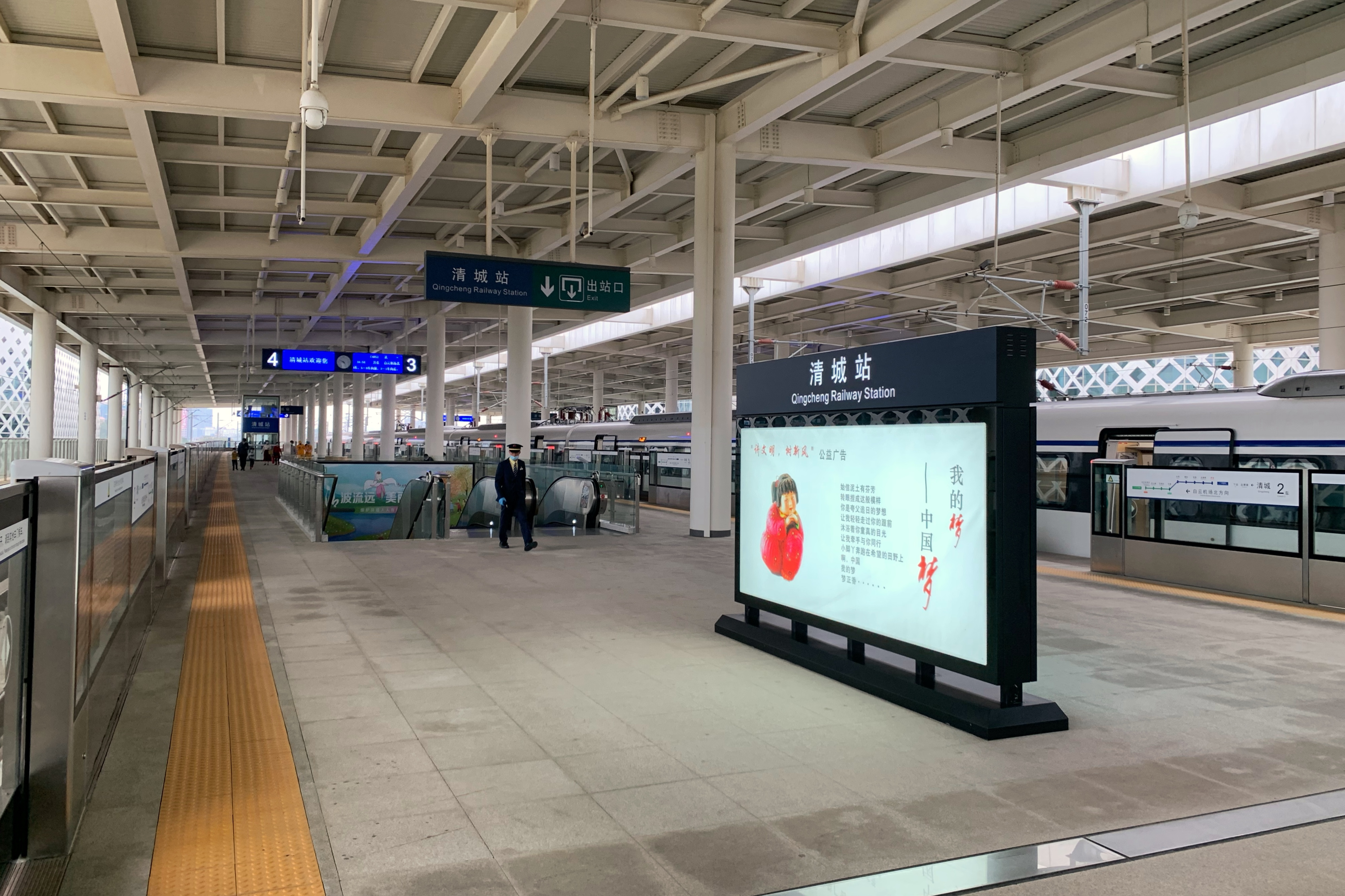
Platform 4

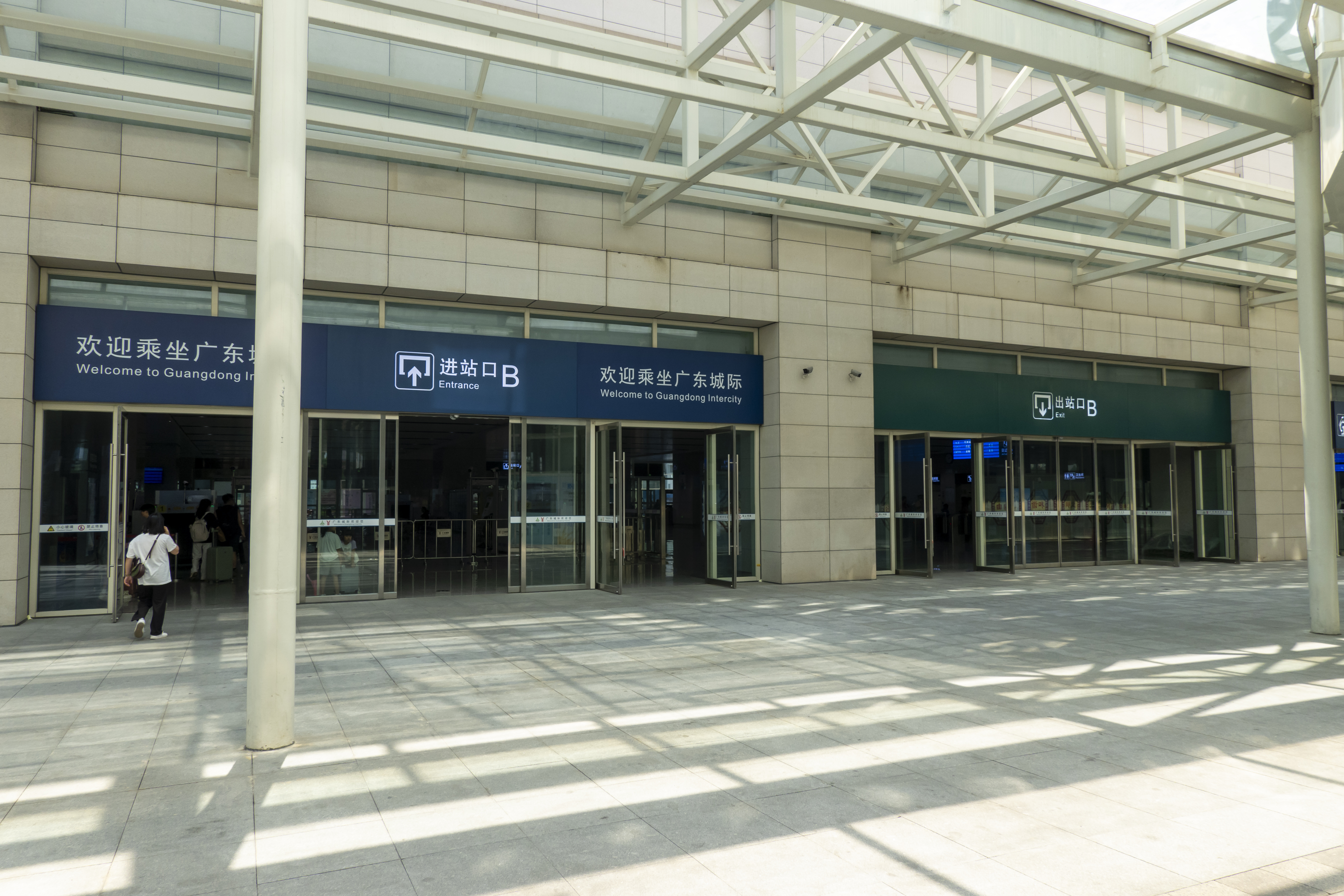
Entrance B

== History ==
The station was called Qingyuan during the planning and construction period, but it has nothing to do with the station of the same name on the Beijing–Guangzhou high-speed railway. The main structure of the station topped out in July 2017.

In 2020, the station was named Qingcheng station. On 30 November 2020, the station opened with the opening of the Guangzhou-Qingyuan Intercity Railway.
