= Guangzhou–Qingyuan intercity railway =

Railway line in Guangdong, China

Guangzhou–Qingyuan intercity railway Guangqing Intercity

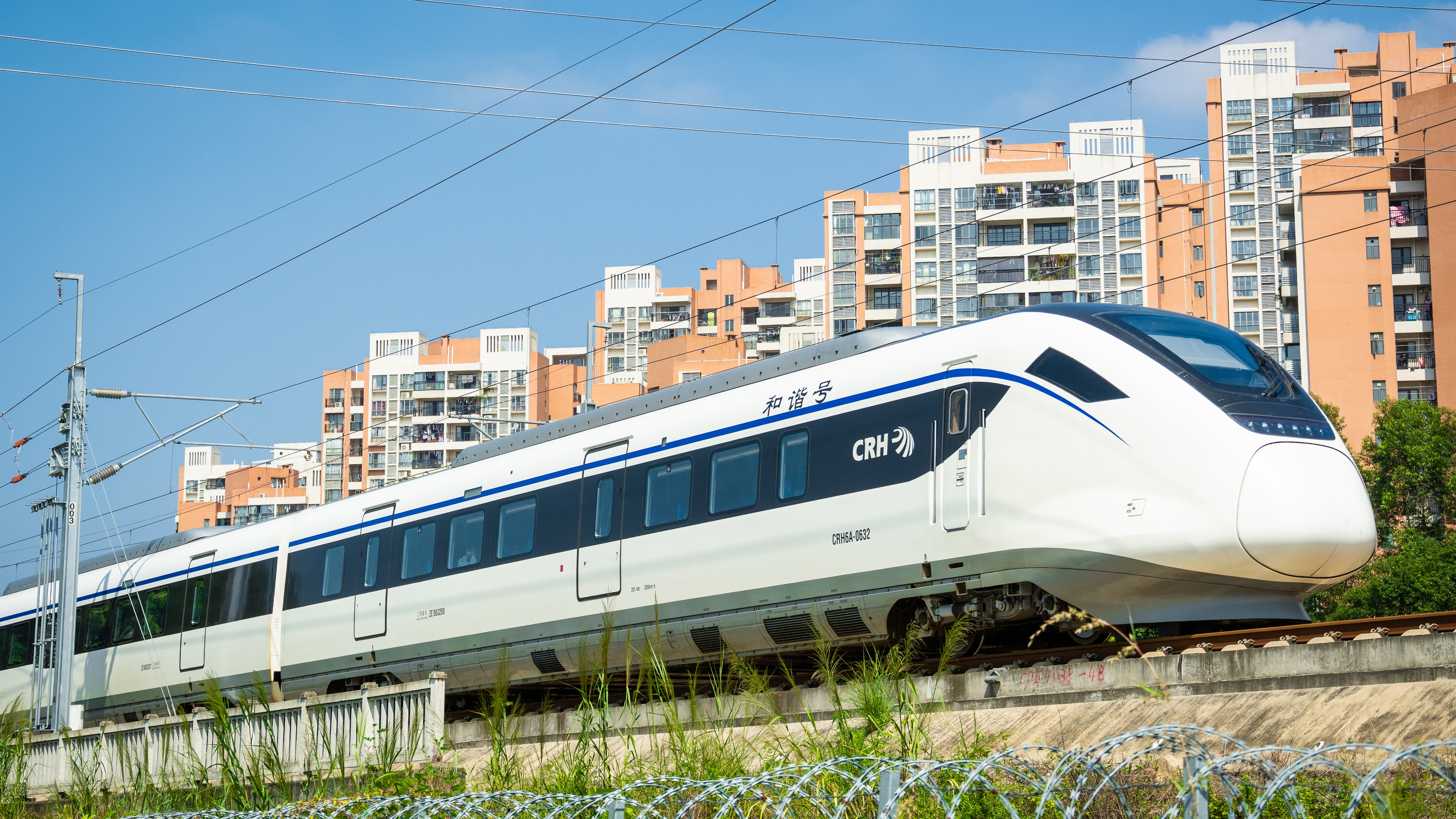
- A CRH6A train near Letong railway station

Overview
- Native name: 广清城际铁路
- Status: Operating
- Owner: Guangdong Pearl River Delta Intercity Railway Transit Co., Ltd.
- Locale: Guangdong, China
- Termini: Guangzhou Baiyun; Feixia
- Stations: 13

Service
- Type: Regional rail
- System: Pearl River Delta Metropolitan Region intercity railway
- Services: 1
- Operator: Guangdong Intercity Railway Operation Co., Ltd. (Note: Subsidiary of Guangzhou Metro Group.)
- Depot: Longtang Depot

Technical
- Line length: 57.781 km (36 mi)
- Track gauge: 1,435 mm (4 ft 8 1/2 in) standard gauge
- Electrification: 50 Hz 25,000 V
- Operating speed: 200 km/h (124 mph)

Guangzhou–Qingyuan intercity railway, also known as the Guangqing intercity railway, is a regional rail within Guangdong province, China. It will connect the provincial capital Guangzhou with Qingyuan. It is a part of the Pearl River Delta Metropolitan Region intercity railway system, with an operating top speed of 200 km/h (124 mph).

== History ==
The railway was opened on November 30, 2020.

On December 28, 2024, its northern extension opened.

On January 28, 2026, its southern extension opened.

== Route ==
Starting at Guangzhou railway station, a high-speed railway will be built alongside the Beijing–Guangzhou railway within the city to Guangzhou North railway station. From there to Qingyuan railway station, this railway will run alongside the Wuhan–Guangzhou high-speed railway with separate platforms for each railway and three new regional stations being built in between these stations. After crossing the Bei River this railway will branch off to the west, serving two new stations in Qingyuan.

== Stations ==
Route	Station Name	Chinese	Distance km		Pearl River Delta intercity railway transfers/connections	Metro transfers/connections	Location
●	Feixia	飞霞	0	0			Qingcheng District, Qingyuan
	Feixiashan (reserved)	飞霞山					Qingcheng District, Qingyuan
●	Zhouxin^{[01]}	洲心	11	11			Qingcheng District, Qingyuan
●	Yanhu	燕湖	6	17			Qingcheng District, Qingyuan
●	Qingcheng	清城	3	20			Qingcheng District, Qingyuan
●	Longtangzhen	龙塘镇	7	27			Qingcheng District, Qingyuan
●	Yinzhan	银盏	8	35		Qingyuan Maglev Tourist Line	Qingcheng District, Qingyuan
●	Shiling	狮岭	12	48			Huadu District, Guangzhou
●	Letong	乐同	4	52			Huadu District, Guangzhou
●	Huadu^{[02]}	花都	6	58	ER (through service)	9 24 (via Guangzhou North)	Huadu District, Guangzhou
●	Shenshan	神山					Baiyun District, Guangzhou
●	Jianggao	江高				8	Baiyun District, Guangzhou
●	Baiyunhu	白云湖					Baiyun District, Guangzhou
●	Guangzhou Baiyun	广州白云				12 22 24 (Baiyun) 8 (via Shitan)	Baiyun District, Guangzhou
	Guangzhou	广州				2 5 11 14 22	Yuexiu District, Guangzhou

- ^{01} The station is located near Qingyuan.
- ^{02} The station is located near Guangzhou North.
