= Zhouxin railway station =

Intercity railway station in Qingyuan, China

Zhouxin 洲心
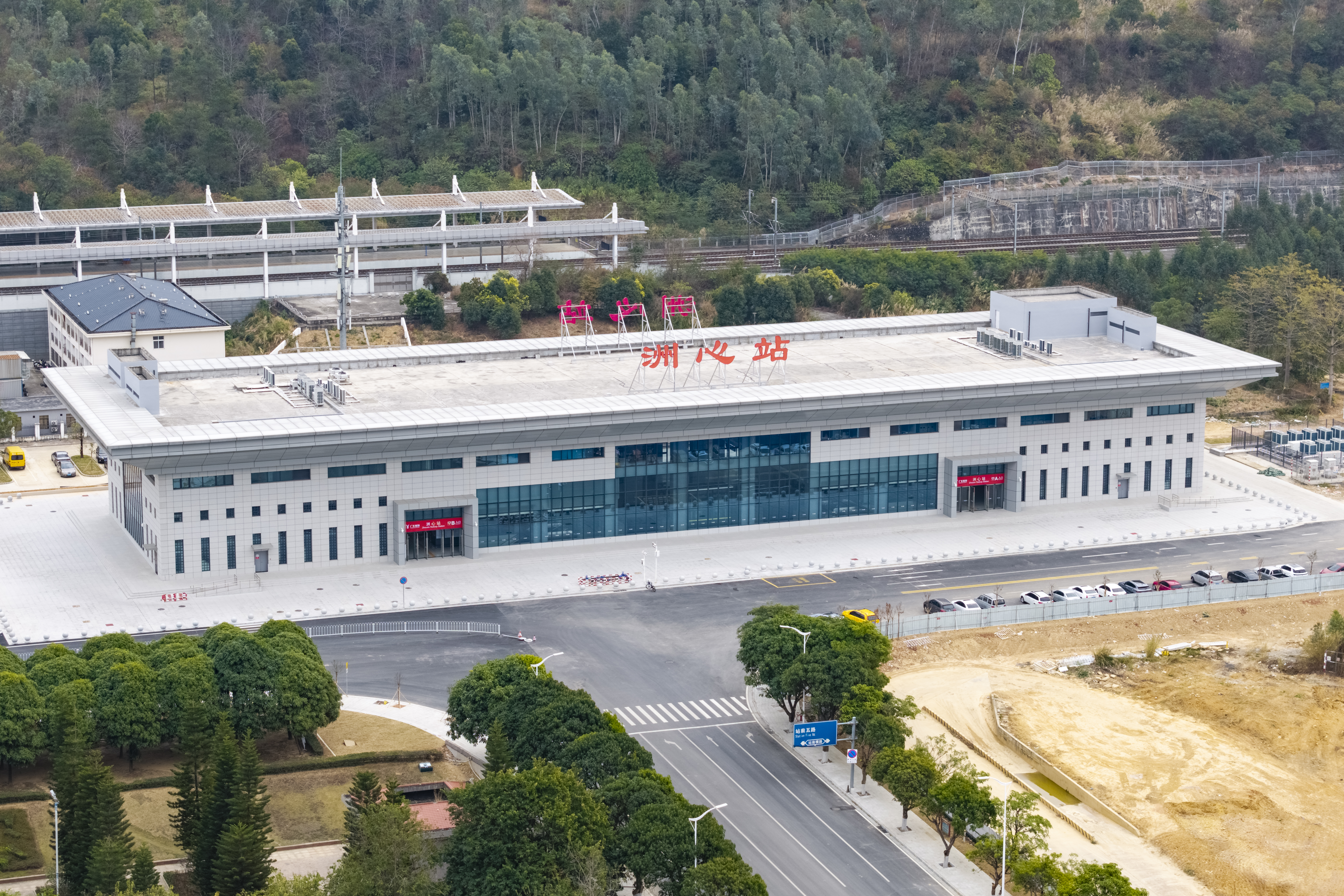
- Exterior

Chinese name
- Chinese: 洲心站
Transcriptions
Standard Mandarin
- Hanyu Pinyin: Zhōuxīn Zhàn
Yue: Cantonese
- Yale Romanization: Jāusām Jaahm
- Jyutping: Zau^{1}sam^{1} Zaam^{6}

General information
- Location: Zhanqian Road (站前路) on the southwest side of Qingyuan railway station Zhouxin Subdistrict, Qingcheng District, Qingyuan, Guangdong; China
- Coordinates: 23°41′43.037″N 113°7′39.641″E
- Owner: Pearl River Delta Metropolitan Region intercity railway
- Operator: Guangdong Intercity
- Line: Guangzhou–Qingyuan intercity railway
- Platforms: 2 (2 side platforms)
- Tracks: 2
- Connections: Qingyuan railway station

Construction
- Structure type: Underground
- Accessible: Yes

Other information
- Station code: ZIA (Pinyin: ZXI)

History
- Opened: 28 December 2024 (19 months ago)
- Former names: Qingyuan East (清远东)

Services
Preceding station	Pearl River Delta Metropolitan Region Intercity Railway	Following station
Feixia Terminus	Guangzhou–Qingyuan intercity railway	Yanhu towards Guangzhou Baiyun
Location

Zhouxin railway station (Chinese: 洲心站; pinyin: Zhōuxīn Zhàn; Cantonese Yale: Jāusām Jaahm) is an underground railway station located in Qingcheng District, Qingyuan, Guangdong, China. It opened on 28 December 2024.

The station is located on the southwest side of Qingyuan railway station of Beijing–Guangzhou high-speed railway. The two stations are staggered, but there is no interchange passageway connecting the two stations.

== Features ==
The station is a three-storey underground station with two side platforms, in which the concourse is at surface level. It has 4 points of entry/exit.

=== Entrances/exits ===
- A: Zhanqian 4th Road, Zhanqian Cross Road
- B: Zhanqian 4th Road, Zhanqian Cross Road, Wuyi Ferry Terminal
- C: Zhanqian 4th Road, Qingyuan railway station
- D: Zhanqian 4th Road, Zhanqian Cross Road

== Gallery ==
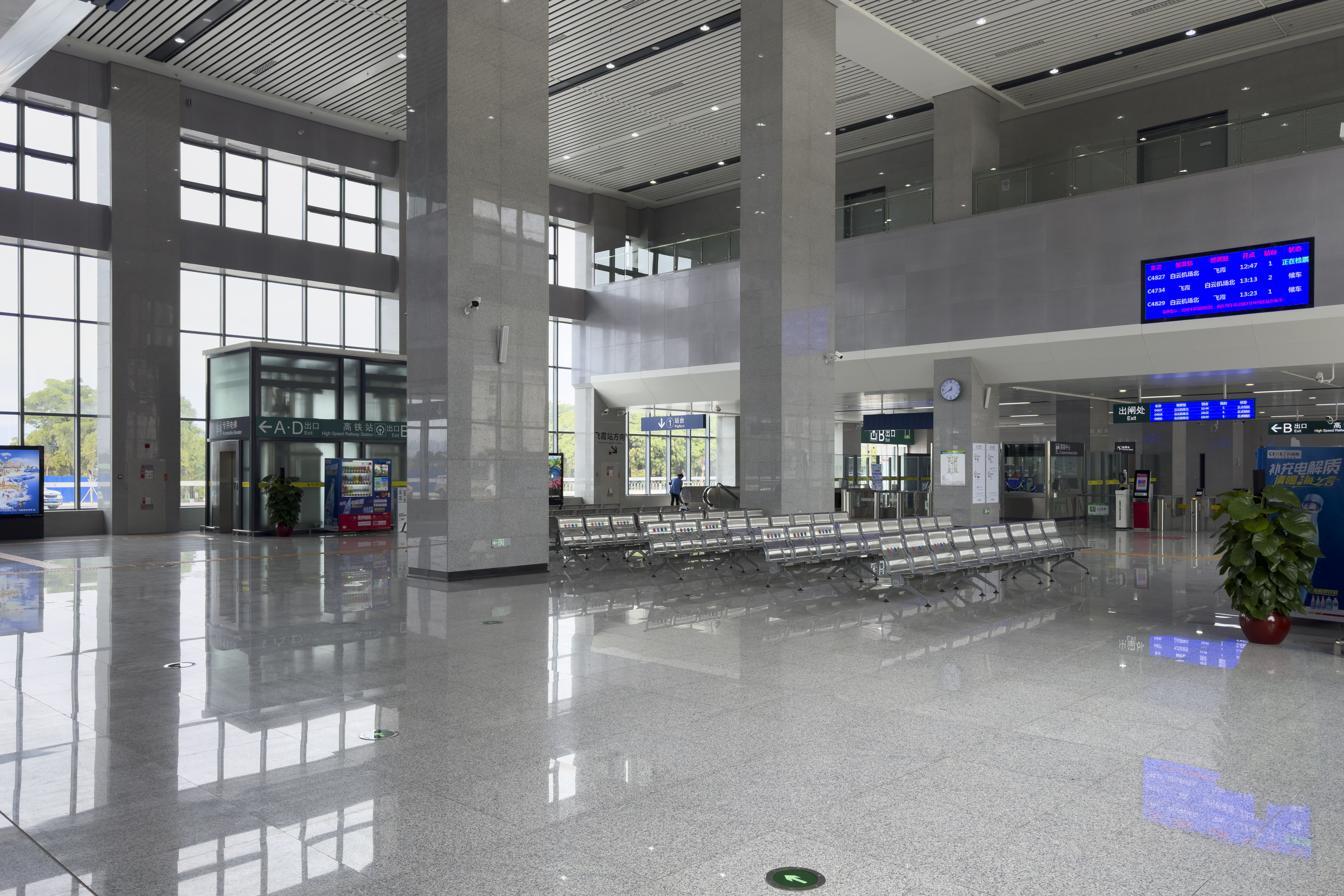
Concourse

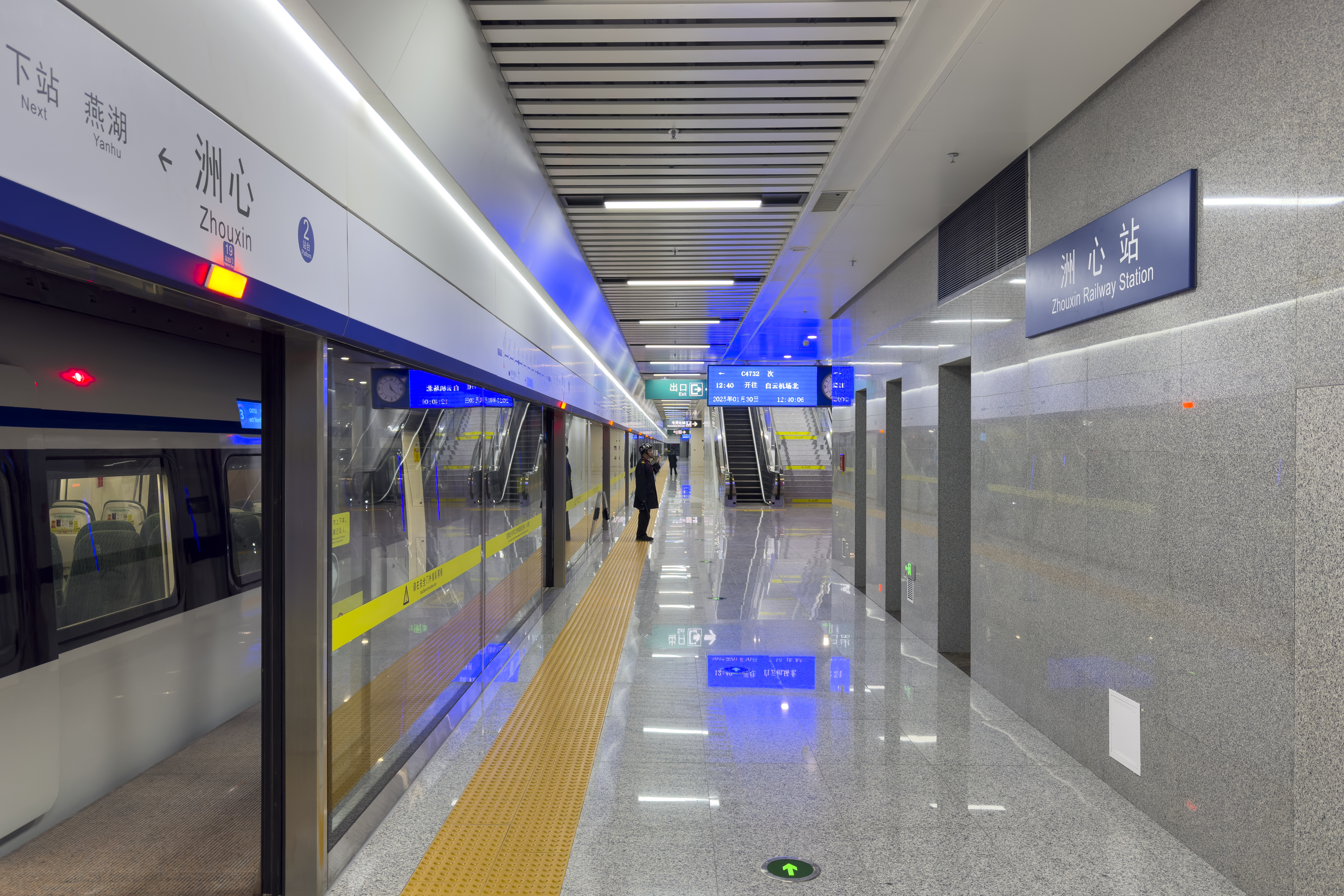
Platform 2

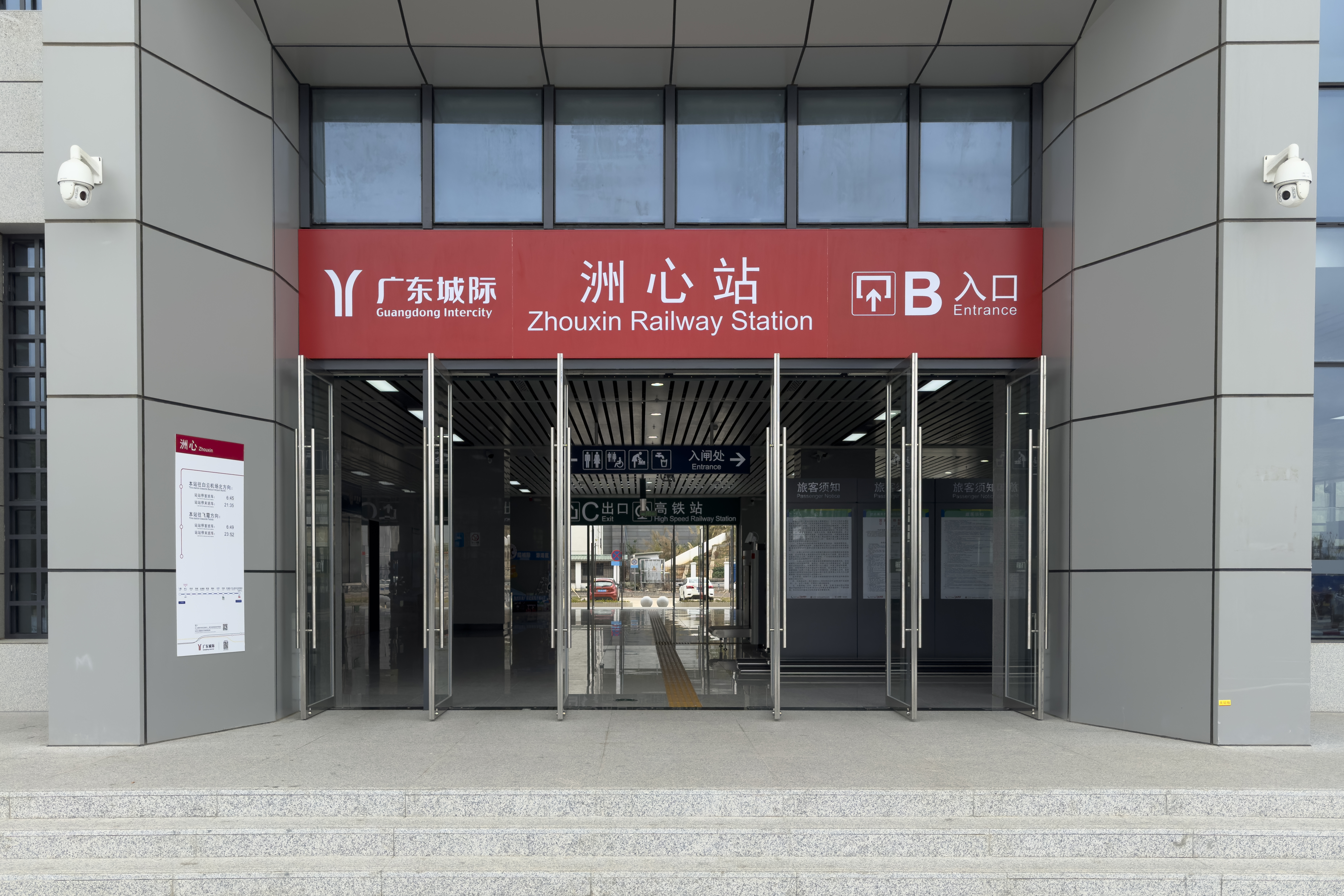
Entrance B

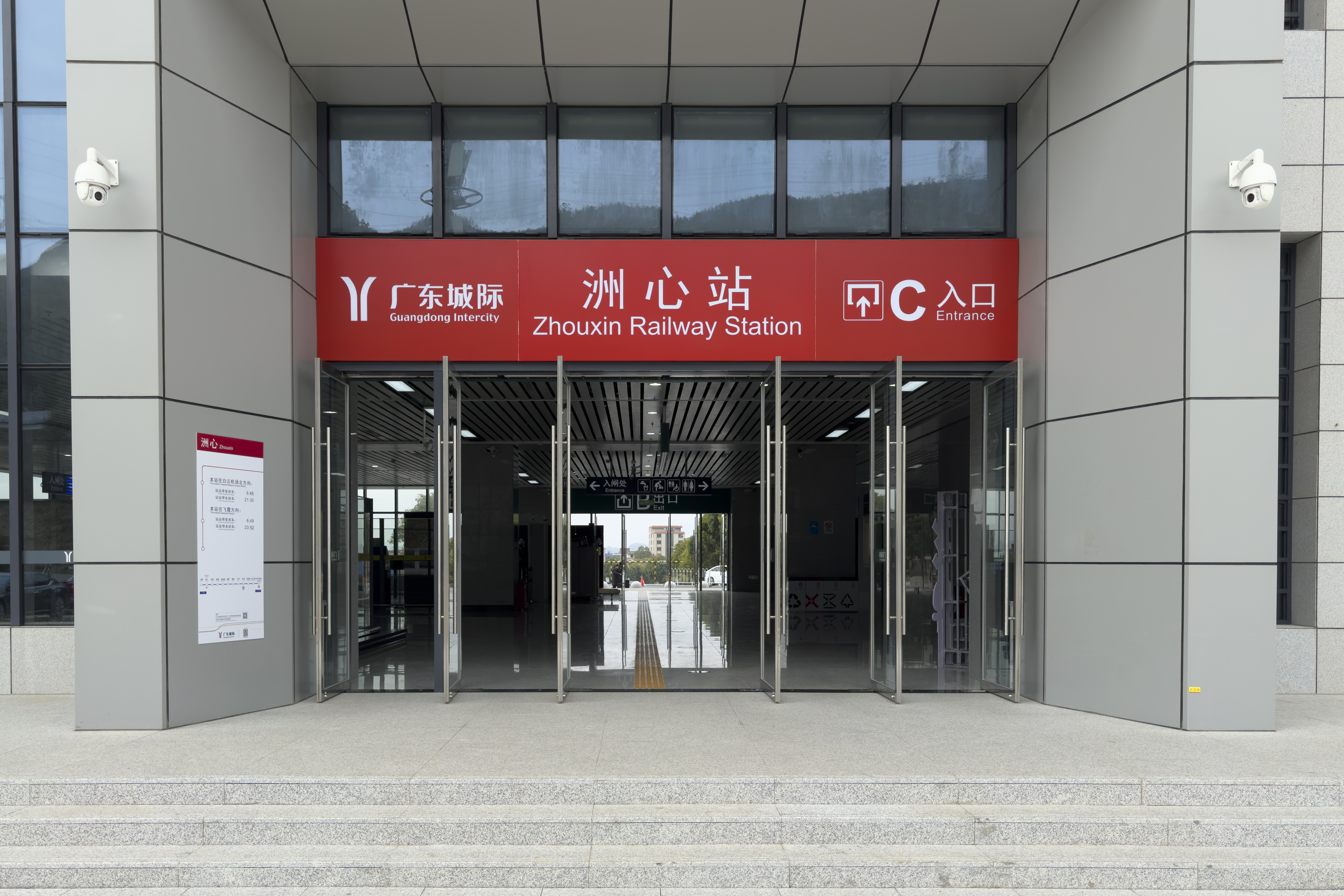
Entrance C

== History ==
During the planning and construction period, this station was called Qingyuan East station. Due to the relative independence of the station, the station did not follow the name of the nearby Qingyuan station. The main structure of the station was topped out in February 2022.

In 2024, the station was renamed to Zhouxin station according to the district where it is located. On 28 December, it was put into use with the opening of the northern extension of the Guangzhou–Qingyuan intercity railway.
