= Qingcheng, Qingyuan =

District in Guangdong, China

Qingcheng 清城区
- District
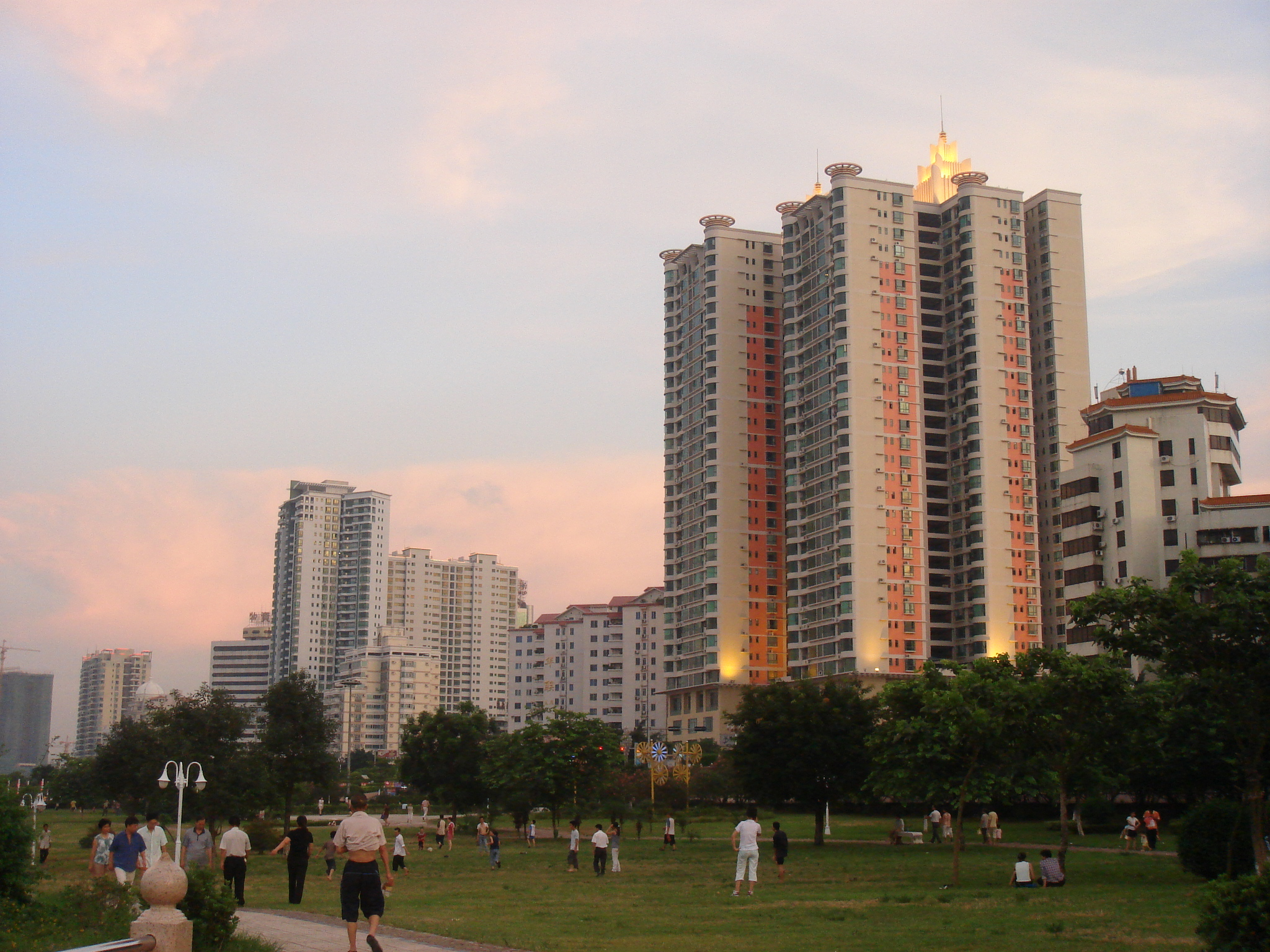

- Location in Guangdong
- Coordinates: 23°43′02″N 113°01′49″E
- Country: People's Republic of China
- Province: Guangdong
- Prefecture-level city: Qingyuan

Area
  - Total: 927 km^{2} (358 sq mi)
- Time zone: UTC+8 (China Standard)

Qingcheng (Chinese: 清城; pinyin: Qīngchéng) is a district of Qingyuan, Guangdong Province, China.

Qingcheng District is located around the Bei River in the middle of Guangdong. Lying in the south of the Qingxin District, the north of Huadu District in Guangzhou, the west of the Fogang Country, the east of the Sanshui District in Foshan City, Qingcheng District covers an area of 927 km^{2} (358 sq mi) with a population of 620,000. The district government is located in the Fengcheng Subdistrict. There are 3 towns, 4 Subdistricts, and a forest farm.

== Climate ==
Qingyuan County is nestled in the land south of the five ridges. Qingcheng District has a subtropical climate, with an average annual temperature of 22.0 °C (71.6 °F), 2,215 mm (87.2 in) of rainfall.

== History ==
Qingcheng District, the predecessor of Qingyuan County, is a county with a long history of 2229 years, formed in the Qin dynasty (221 BC).

Many celebrities such as Zhang Jiuling, Su Dongpo, Yang Wanli, Han Yu, Hai Rui, etc. have adopted Qingyuan County as their hometown.

On January 7, 1988, the State Council approved the upgrading of Qingyuan County to Qingyuan City. Qingyuan County was divided into two county-level areas, Qingcheng District, and Qingjiao District (the Qingxin County, now Qingxin District). On January 28, the provincial government declared that Qingcheng, Fucheng, and Zhouxin would belong to Qingcheng District.

In April 2012, there were 4 Subdistricts, 4 towns, 77 neighborhood committees, and 71 village committees in Qingcheng District.

== Administration ==
There are 4 Subdistricts (Fengcheng Subdistrict, Dongcheng Subdistrict, Zhouxin Subdistrict, Henghe Subdistrict), 4 towns (Yuantan, Shijiao, Longtang, and Feilaixia).

== Geography ==
Qingyuan's administrative area ranges in latitude from 23° 42' to 23° 27' N, and in longitude from 112° 50' to 113° 22′ E, located in the north of Guangdong province, the south of Qingyuan city, the west of Fogang and the north of Huadu.

== Economy ==
It is the transportation junction of the north of Guangzhou area and the commodity distributing center from the north to the south of Guangdong province. It was awarded as the "China Excellent Tourism City" in 2001.

=== Mineral resources ===
Qingcheng District is rich in various high-grade minerals, including albite, potash feldspar, iron ore, kaolin, and rare earth elements. They make a great contribution to the foundation of the local building materials industry.

=== Water resources ===
Qingcheng district is rich in shallow groundwater. Beijiang River, Dayan River and Bijia River are the main river. There are more than 20 reservoir, such as Yingzui reservoir, Yingzhan reservoir and Huadou reservoir and so on.

=== Land resources ===
As for the land resources, there are about 70% of the area are plain and hilly land. It is an advantage for the building construction and large-scale industrial.

=== Tourism ===
In term of tourism, the north of the Qingcheng area is a mountainous area. Feixia mountain, Bijia mountain, Damao mountain are some of the typical interest of places.

=== Industry ===
Industry is the mainstay of the economy of the Qingcheng district. Particularly, the light industry is developed. The pillar industry of Qingcheng District are wire and cable, ceramics, electronics, building materials, plastic and clothing industries.

=== Agriculture ===
Agriculture of Qingcheng district is quite developed. Covering a farmland area of 25.7 million km^{2}, Qingcheng district had made great effort at the agriculture. The main produce is rice. Economic crops includes vegetables, flowers, fruits, bamboo shoots and so on. Qingyuan partridge chicken and black brown goose famous are famous at home and abroad. As a fresh agricultural production base of the pearl river delta, Qingcheng district produce a large sum of pigs and other aquatic products.

=== Labor force ===
There are about 100000 people are overseas Chinese and compatriots in Hong Kong and Macao. It is an important Overseas Chinese hometown. At present, there are about 200000 labor force. It owns a labor cost advantage in developing the labor-intensive export processing and other industries.

The real estate industry, tourism and trade circulation are becoming the pillar industries of Qingcheng district economy.

== Agriculture ==
Qingcheng district played a role as the main provider of Guangdong province and the original Qingyuan Country. Since Qingyuan Country became the Qingyuan City in 1988, the agriculture is still the main basic industry. With the increasing percent of the area for urban and decreasing of the agriculture, the government decided to adjust the structure of the agriculture. They improve the technology and put their heart to develop the outskirt-type agriculture, planting vegetable, fruit, flowers and so on. They have turned the tradition agriculture into the commercial agricultural. Qingcheng District earned 1313milion,4,58 times compared to 1988.

== Transport ==
Qingcheng district is located in the south of Qingyuan—the center of Guangdong Province, 60 kilometers away from the center of Guangzhou, 28 kilometers away from the new Baiyun International Airport. It has an advantaged religion. Beijing-Guangzhou railway, Wuhan-Guangzhou high-speed railway, Jing-Zhu Expressway, Guangzhou-Qingyuan expressway, Guangzhou-Lengchang expressway and 107 national road across Qingcheng District.

Transportation Projects are developing in Qingcheng District: Foqingcong highway, Shantou-Zhanjiang highway, Guangzhou-Qingyuan intercity railway.

Transportation in Qingcheng district is convenient. At the north of Qingcheng district, the 107 National Road runs through the whole region. It is only 28 kilometers away from the Guangzhou New International Airport. The district is on the west of the Qingfo highway and the east of Qingsan highway. The Beijiang River are available for 100 tons of ships.

=== railway stations ===
- Beijing-Guangzhou railway: Yinzhan'ao railway station and Yuantan railway station
- Beijing-Guangzhou high-speed railway: Qingyuan railway station
- Guangzhou-Qingyuan intercity railway: Feixia railway station, Zhouxin railway station, Yanhu railway station, Qingcheng railway station, Longtangzhen railway station, Yinzhan railway station

== Language ==
Alongside Mandarin, the main language in Qingcheng District is Cantonese. Some residents of Shijiao speak Hakka, while residents of Zhouxin speak "He".

== Travel ==
In order to commemorate the patriotic with Zhu Ruzhen, the last Bangyan of the Qing dynasty, Qingcheng district government built the park. There is a statue of Zhu Ruzhen and China's excellent tourism sculpture. It shows the beauty of the classical gardens and the charm of the humanities in Qingyuan.

The Rooster rock is a famous scenic spot in Qingyuan, having a 1600-year history. Countless literati poet, singular Chester, South officials, monks, Taoist and the hiking visitors left their footprints here since a thousand years ago.such as the poetry and the exploration of anecdotes. The shape of the Rooster rock is similar to a rooster.

Huang Tengxia scenic spot, "the King of drifting", is the best natural ecological tourist area in Qingyuan in terms of the quality and quantity of water, the preserved condition of plants. It is only 3.8 km (2.4 mi) away from the downtown.

Qingyuan Earl park is a park about ecological tourism, leisure, entertainment, catering and tourism.

Qingyuan Feng cheng ecological park is a theme park about outdoor activities and sports. The radium war combat and military expansion can serve as entertainment and be enjoyed by visitors.

== Food ==
There are Cantonese and Hakka foods in Qingcheng District. There are many delicious food in Qingcheng District, such as Qingyuan Sliced Cold Chicken, Kowloon tofu, knife cut cake, Pork with salted vegetables and Zhouxin porridge.
