= Qingyuan railway station =

Railway station in Guangdong, China

Qingyuan 清远
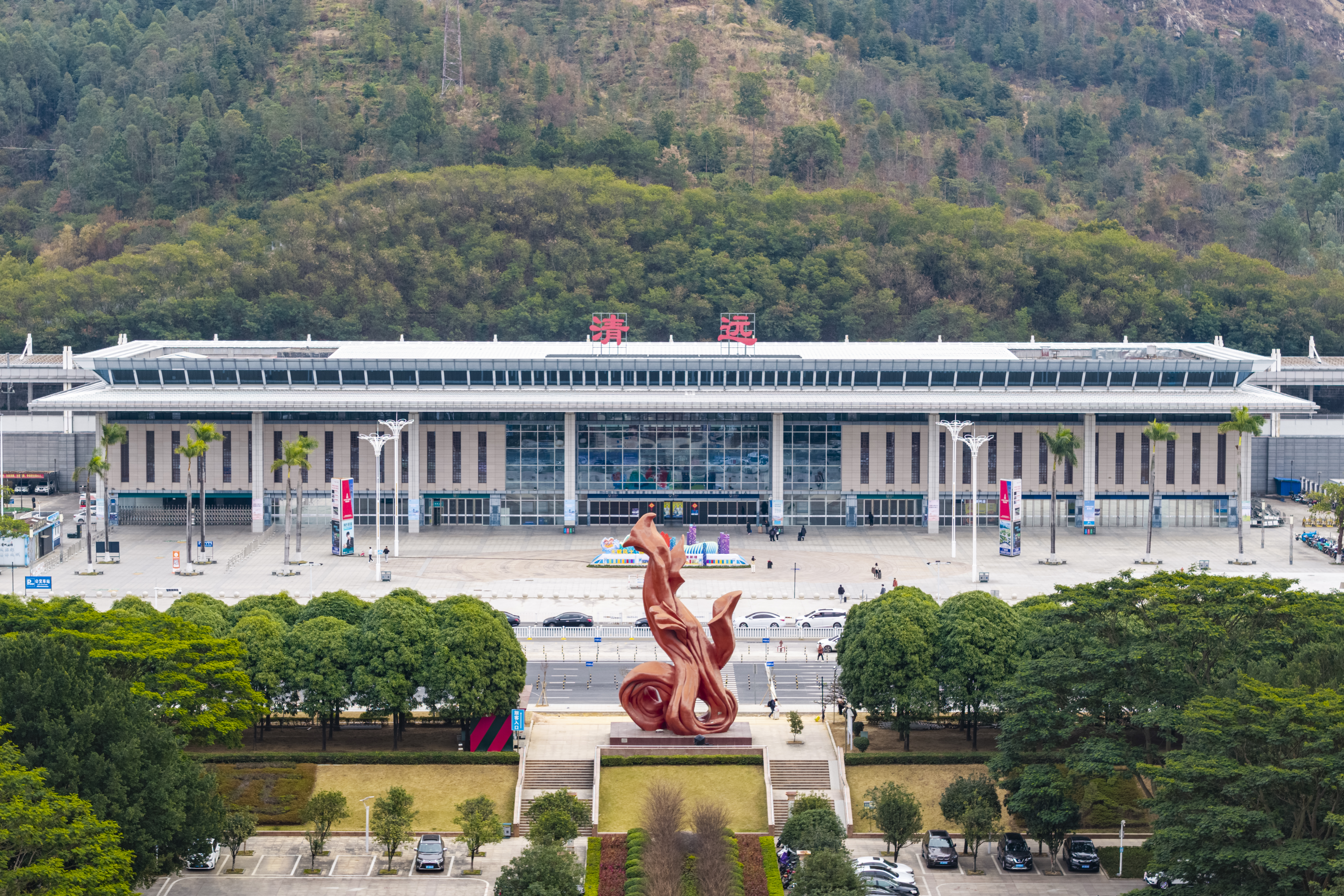
- Exterior

General information
- Location: Qingcheng District, Qingyuan, Guangdong; China
- Coordinates: 23°41′46.50″N 113°7′45.91″E
- Operated by: China Railway Guangzhou Group
- Line(s): Wuhan–Guangzhou high-speed railway
- Connections: Zhouxin railway station

Construction
- Structure type: Elevated
- Accessible: Yes

Other information
- Station code: TMIS code: 65845; Telegraph code: QBQ; Pinyin code: QYU
- Classification: 2nd class station

History
- Opened: 26 December 2009

Qingyuan railway station (simplified Chinese: 清远站; traditional Chinese: 清遠站; pinyin: Qīngyuǎn zhàn) is a railway station located in Qingcheng District, Qingyuan, Guangdong, China. On the Wuhan–Guangzhou High-Speed Railway, it is served by 300 km/h (190 mph) high speed trains.

Opened on 26 December 2009, Qingyuan railway station is located some distance to the east of the Qingyuan city, but is closer to it than Yuantan railway station on the Beijing–Guangzhou railway.

Preceding station	China Railway High-speed	Following station
Yingde West towards Wuhan	Wuhan–Guangzhou high-speed railway	Guangzhou North towards Guangzhou South
