= Feixia railway station =

Intercity railway station in Qingyuan, China

Feixia 飞霞
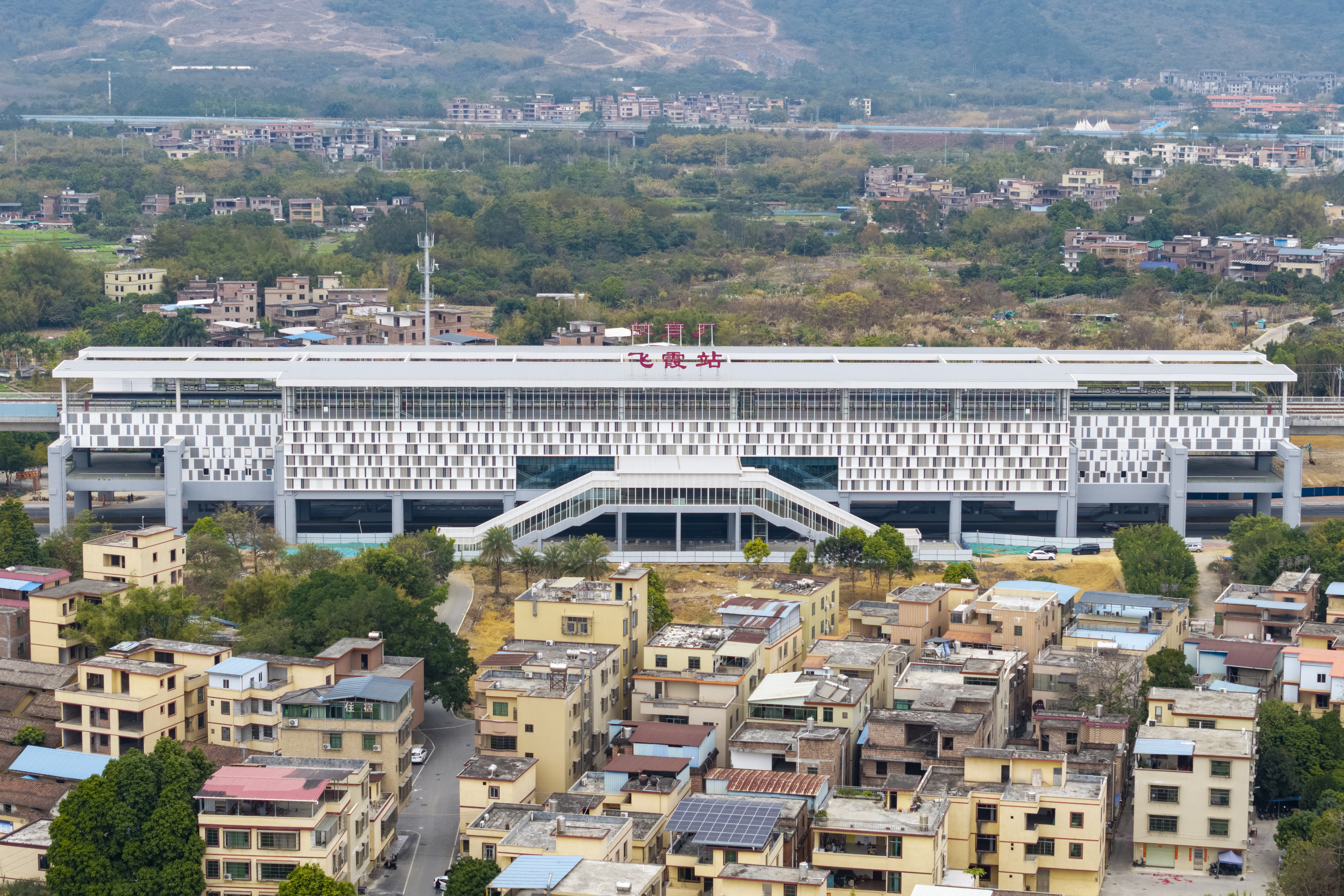
- Exterior

Chinese name
- Simplified Chinese: 飞霞站
- Traditional Chinese: 飛霞站
Transcriptions
Standard Mandarin
- Hanyu Pinyin: Fēixiá Zhàn
Yue: Cantonese
- Yale Romanization: Fēihah Jaahm
- Jyutping: Fei^{1}haa^{4} Zaam^{6}

General information
- Location: Vocational Education 1st Road on the west side of Guangdong Vocational Education City; Dongcheng Subdistrict, Qingcheng District, Qingyuan, Guangdong; China
- Coordinates: 23°44′38.360″N 113°4′45.829″E
- Owner: Pearl River Delta Metropolitan Region intercity railway
- Operator: Guangdong Intercity
- Line: Guangzhou–Qingyuan intercity railway
- Platforms: 2 (2 side platforms)
- Tracks: 4

Construction
- Structure type: Elevated
- Accessible: Yes

Other information
- Station code: FEA (Pinyin: FXI)

History
- Opened: 28 December 2024 (19 months ago)
- Former names: Provincial Vocational Education City (省职教城)

Services
| Preceding station | Pearl River Delta Metropolitan Region Intercity Railway | Following station |
|---|---|---|
| Terminus | Guangzhou–Qingyuan intercity railway | Zhouxin towards Guangzhou Baiyun |
Location

Feixia railway station (Chinese: 飞霞站; pinyin: Fēixiá Zhàn; Cantonese Yale: Fēihah Jaahm) is a railway station located in Qingcheng District, Qingyuan, Guangdong, China. It opened on 28 December 2024, being the northern terminus of the Guangzhou–Qingyuan intercity railway.

== Features ==
The station is an elevated three-storey station with four tracks and two side platforms. The design of the station building incorporates elements of bookcases. It has 4 points of entry/exit.

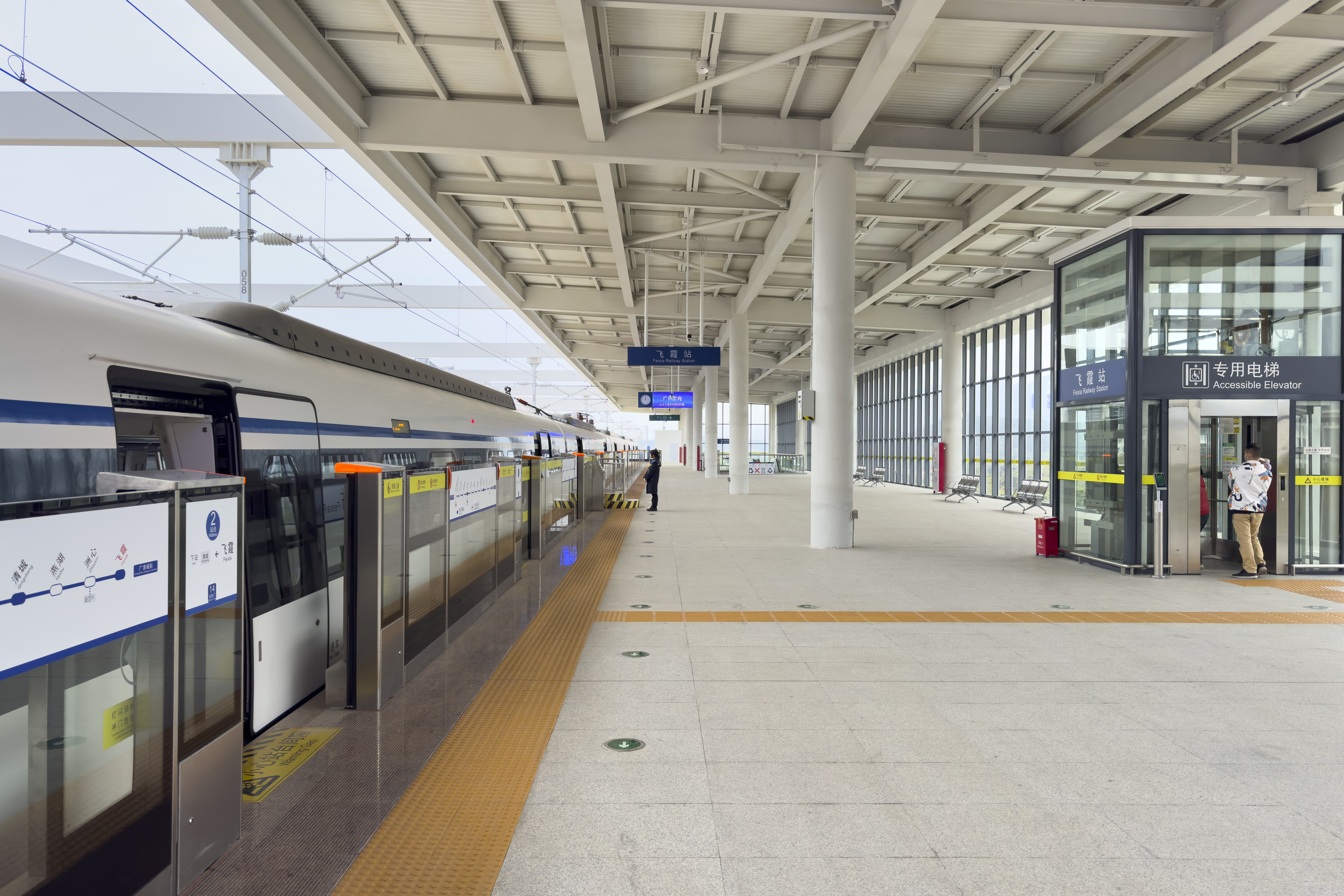
Platform 2

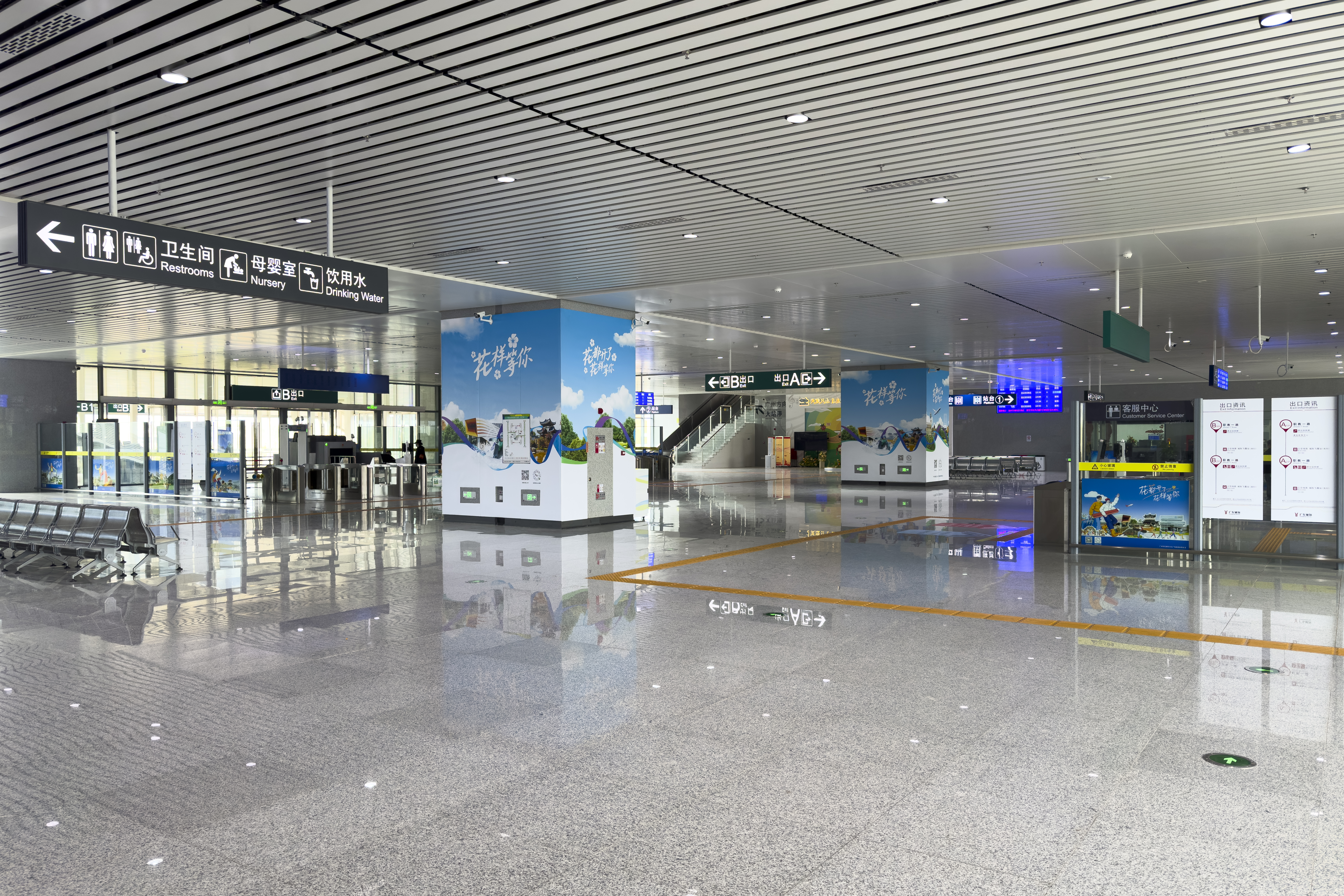
Concourse

=== Entrances/exits ===
- A1: Vocational Education 1st Road, Qingyuan Sports Center
- A2: Vocational Education 1st Road
- B1: Vocational Education 1st Road
- B2: Vocational Education 1st Road
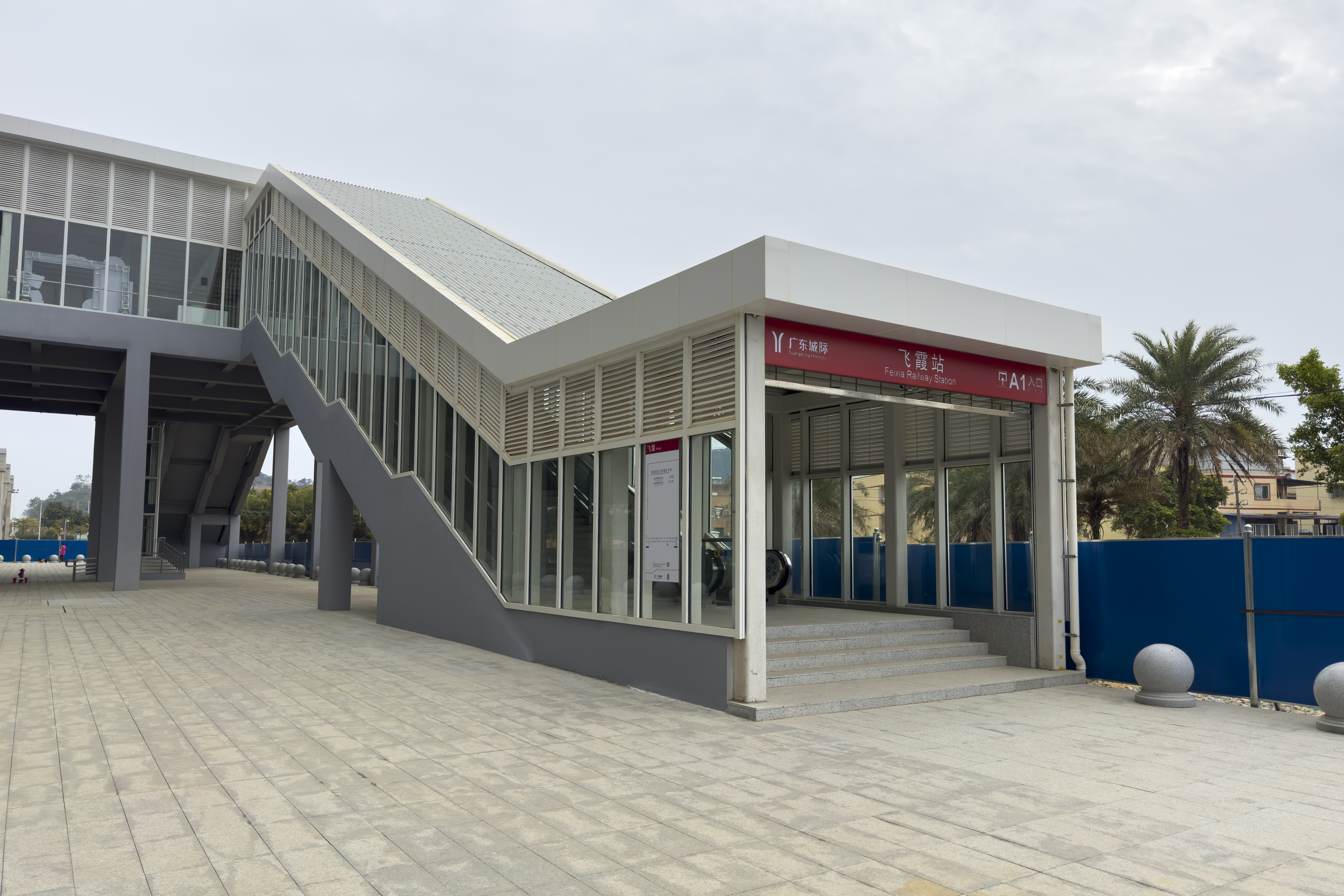
Entrance A1

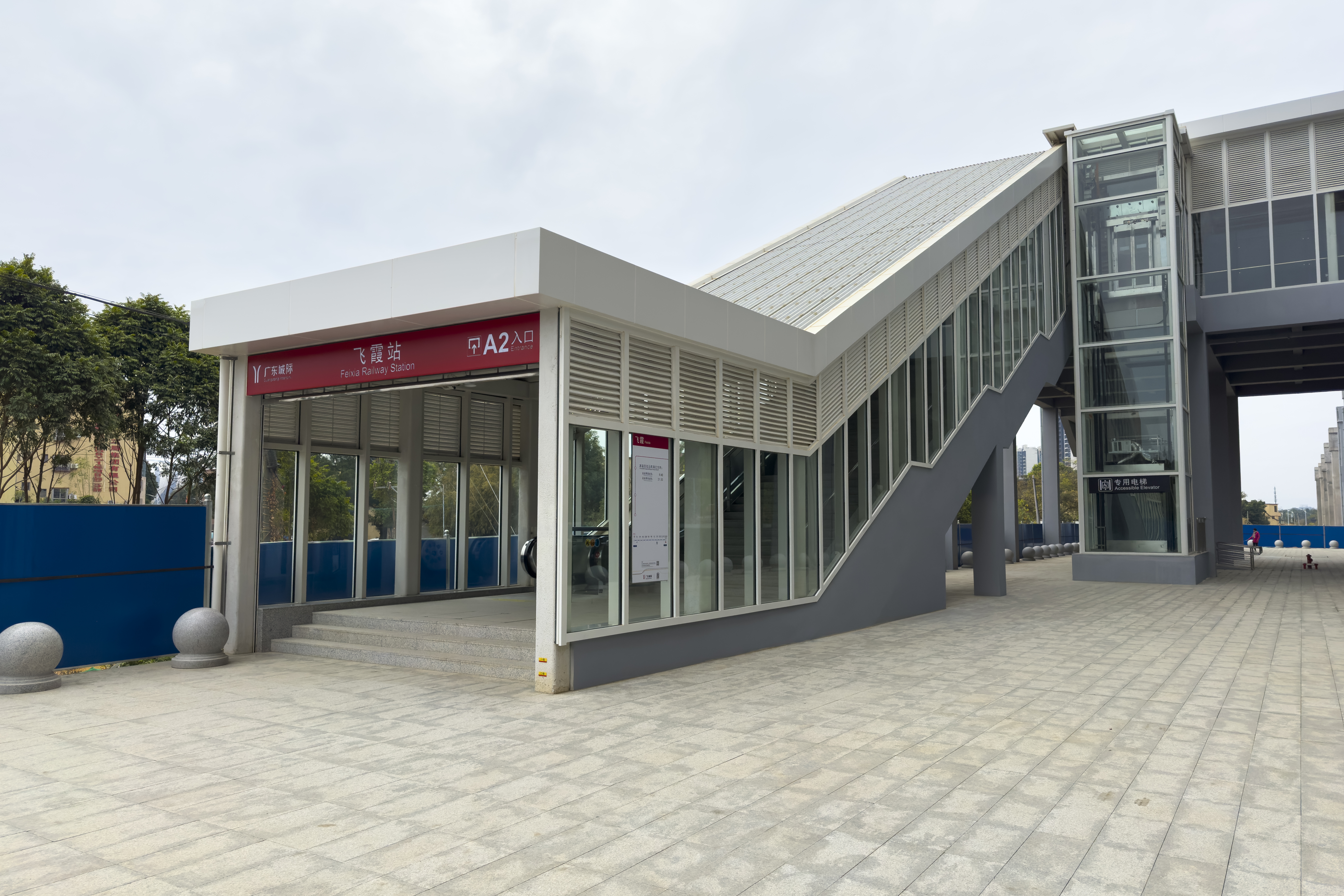
Entrance A2

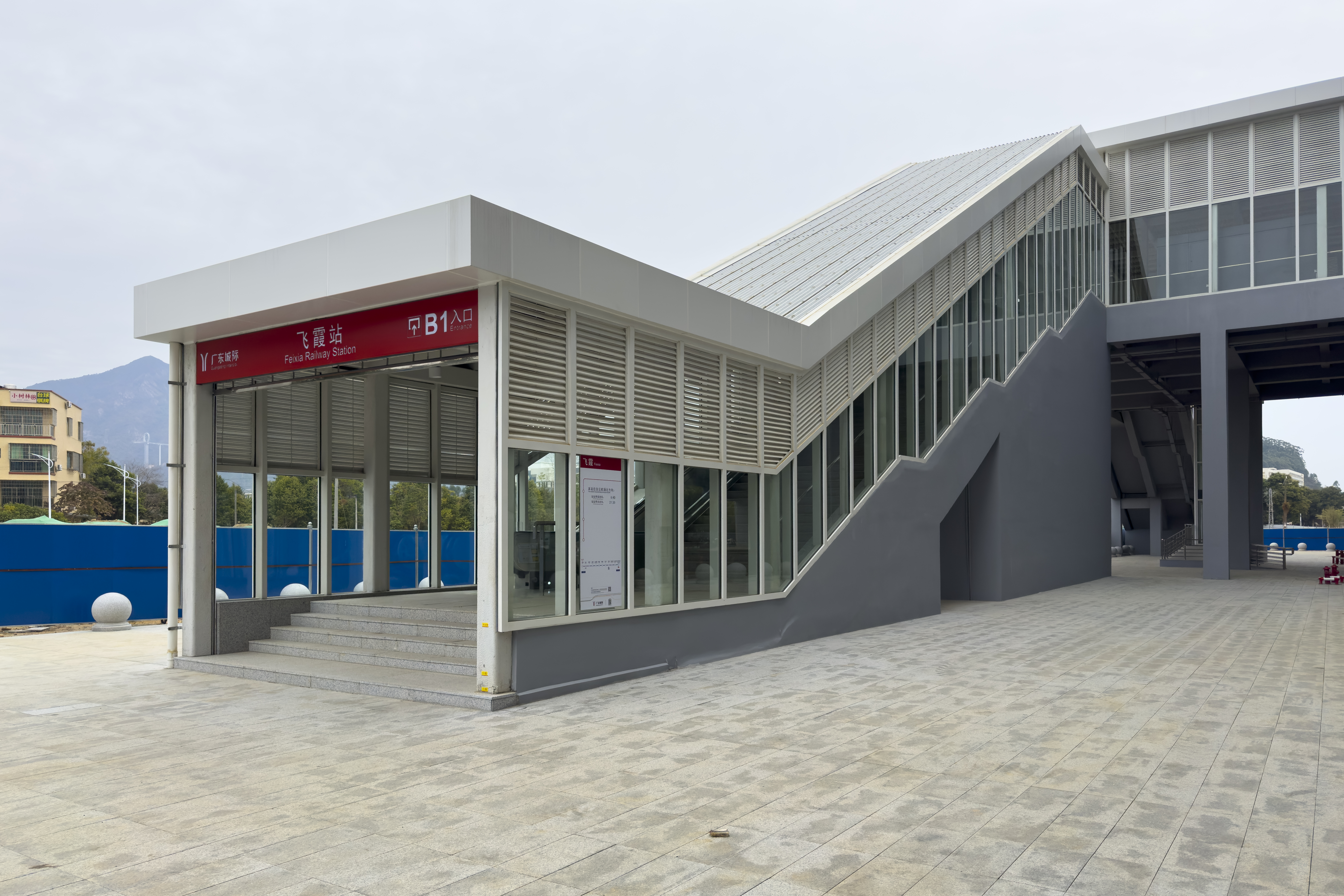
Entrance B1

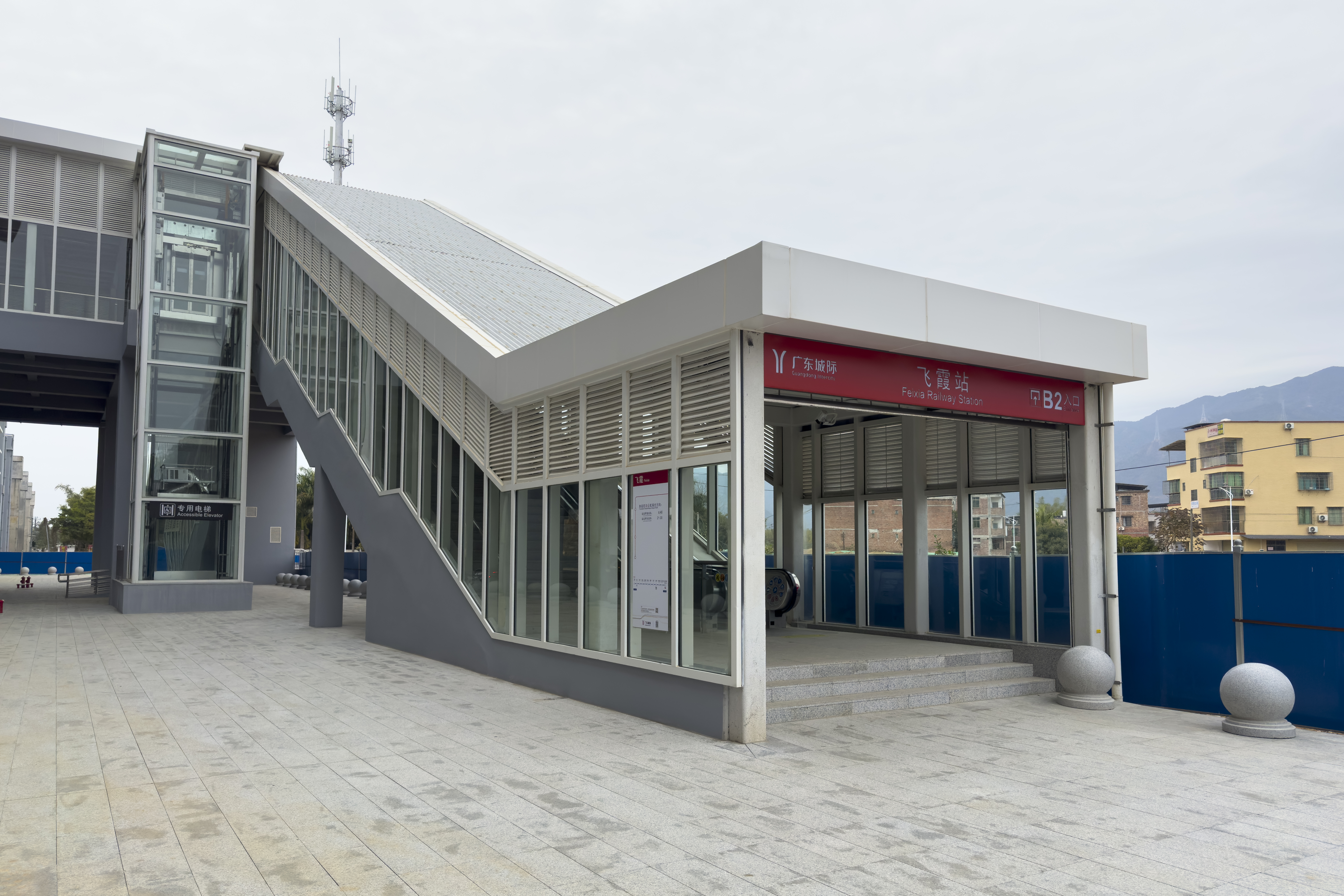
Entrance B2

== History ==
During the planning and construction period, this station was referred to as the Provincial Vocational Education City station, serving as a supporting station for the Guangdong Vocational Education City. The main structure of the station topped out in January 2023.

In 2024, the station was renamed to Feixia station based on the Feixia Mountain scenic attraction. On 28 December, it was put into use with the opening of the northern extension of the Guangzhou–Qingyuan intercity railway.

== Future development ==
According to the plan, the line will continue to extend to the Qingxin District in the future. The station has reserved the conditions for the westward extension of the line.
